= Mira quién baila =

Mira quién baila may refer to:

- Mira quién baila (Spanish TV series)
- Mira quién baila (American TV series), a 2010 American game show
  - Mira quién baila (season 1)
  - Mira quién baila (season 2)
  - Mira quién baila (season 3)
  - Mira quién baila (season 4)
  - Mira quién baila (season 5)
