= Alina María Hernández =

Cuban television actress

Alina María Hernández (born Alberto, November 12, 1971 – October 7, 2016)better known in the entertainment world as Cachita, was a Cuban transgender television actress.

== Life and work ==
Cachita debuted on television as a participant in a singing contest at Don Francisco's Sábado Gigante ("Gigantic Saturday") show, on Univision. After winning the contest, she used the 500 US dollars she earned to buy a car. She was still a struggling actor when she found work at Univision's El Gordo y la Flaca show, in 1998. There, she became friends with co-hosts Raúl De Molina, Lili Estefan and Marta Martin Carrera-Ruiz. Guest entertainers often told her that she looked much like Estefan.

Cachita admitted, in an Internet interview, that she had sex change surgery, becoming female. She told her fans that she had always felt she had a female mind and was trapped in a male body. She also admitted wearing a blond wig; her normal hair color was dark. The last medical step towards her becoming a female came in late November 2005, when TVNotas, a magazine she worked for, paid for her sex-change surgery.

Before her sex-change operation, Cachita was a restaurant worker. Her boss told her that she would be allowed to come to work dressed as a woman, and her co-workers were advised to refer to her as "Alina".

Cachita returned to Cuba for a family visit soon after the first of her series of sex-change surgeries. She had a difficult time there with her family, as her aunt and grandmother in particular did not accept her change. Her aunt in particular insisted on calling her "Alberto", and her mother, who supported her decision, reacted angrily at Cachita's aunt, telling her that Alberto had become a woman and her name was "Alina".

== Later work ==
Cachita was famous among Univision TV viewers for her entrances to the El Gordo y la Flaca show: She always fell to the floor when she entered the studio. Since the show consists mainly of gossiping, Cachita was often brought in to talk about scandals; such was the case when she intervened on the show the Monday after Janet Jackson's "wardrobe malfunction" at the 2004 Super Bowl.

Being a regular on El Gordo y La Flaca allowed Cachita to expand her career: she also worked as a reporter at some award shows, like Premios Lo Nuestro and others. Besides that, she was also a writer, with a column in TVnotas.

Alina Hernandez died on October 7, 2016.
