= Mira quién baila (American TV series) season 11 =

Mira quién baila
- Season 11
- Winner: Adrián Lastra
- No. of episodes: 8

Release
- Original network: Univision
- Original release: October 1 – November 19, 2023

Season chronology
- ← Previous; Season 10

The eleventh season of Mira quién baila, also known as Mira quién baila, la revancha premiered on Univision on October 1, 2023. This season features six alumni from other dancing competitions, and two rookies. They are paired with eight professional ballroom dancers. The winner will receive a grand prize donation to the charity of their choice. Chiquinquirá Delgado and Mane de la Parra returned as the show's hosts. Sherlyn also returned as backstage reporter. Isaac Hernández, and Roselyn Sánchez returned as judges from the previous season, while former judge Bianca Marroquín returned to the show as the third judge, replacing Paulina Rubio.

The winner, Adrián Lastra, received US$35,000 for his chosen charity.

== Celebrities ==
Celebrity	Notability	Original season	Charity	Status	Ref.
Frida Sofía	Singer-songwriter	—N/a	National Alliance on Mental Illness	Eliminated on October 8, 2023	
Diego Amozurrutia	Actor / singer	—N/a	Amigos For Kids	Eliminated on October 15, 2023	
Amara La Negra	Singer / actress	Mira quién baila 2019	Poder Latinx	Withdrew on October 29, 2023	
Sandra Itzel	Singer / actress	Así se baila	Chicanos por la Causa de Colores	Eliminated on November 5, 2023	
Raúl Coronado	Actor	Las estrellas bailan en Hoy 1	TeletónUSA	Eliminated on November 12, 2023	
Lambda García	Actor	Las estrellas bailan en Hoy 1	No Kid Hungry	Third place on November 19, 2023	
Lis Vega	Actress / singer	Las estrellas bailan en Hoy 3	National Pediatric Cancer Foundation	Runner-up on November 19, 2023	
Adrián Lastra	Actor	Mira quién baila 2020	St. Jude Children's Research Hospital	Winner on November 19, 2023	

== Ratings ==
Episode		Air date	Viewers (millions)
1	"Week 1"	October 1, 2023	0.84
2	"Week 2"	October 8, 2023	1.04
3	"Week 3"	October 15, 2023	0.85
4	"Week 4"	October 22, 2023	0.85
5	"Week 5"	October 29, 2023	1.05
6	"Week 6"	November 5, 2023	0.87
7	"Semifinal"	November 12, 2023	0.88
8	"Final"	November 19, 2023	1.04
