= Mira quién baila (American TV series) season 2 =

Mira quién baila
- Season 2
- Winner: Adamari Lopez
- No. of episodes: 11

Release
- Original network: Univision
- Original release: September 11 – November 20, 2011

Season chronology
- ← Previous; Mira Quien Baila 2010 Next → Mira Quien Baila 2012

Season two of Mira quién baila premiered on Univision on September 11, 2011 and ended on November 20, 2011. The TV series is the Spanish version of British version Strictly Come Dancing and American Version Dancing with the Stars (American TV series). Ten celebrities are paired with ten professional ballroom dancers. Javier Posa and Chiquinquirá Delgado are the hosts for this season. Adamari López won 1st place, while Priscila Angel won 2nd place, and Erik Estrada in 3rd place.

== Judges ==
Judge	Occupation
Horacio Villalobos	TV host and actor
Lili Estefan	TV host of El Gordo y La Flaca
Bianca Marroquin	Musical theatre Actor

== The Celebrities ==
Nationality	Celebrity	Known for	Charity	Status
Mexico	Stephanie Salas	Former Television Actress	Puentes de Salud	Eliminated (Day 7) st on September 25, 2011
Mexico	Geraldine Bazan	Actress	Big Brothers Big Sisters of America	Eliminated (Day 14) nd on October 3, 2011
Mexico	Blue Demon Jr.	Professional wrestler, son of the legendary Blue Demon	Shriners Hospitals for Children	Eliminated (Day 21) rd on October 9, 2011
Venezuela	Alejandro Chabán	Actor and model	Partnership for a Healthier America	Eliminated (Day 28) th on October 16, 2011
Argentina	Christian Suarez	Boyfriend of Talk Show Host Laura Bozzo	La Ventana de los Cielos	Eliminated (Day 35) th on October 23, 2011
Mexico	José Manuel Figueroa	Singer	CARE	Eliminated (Day 42) th on October 27, 2011
Mexico	Elizabeth Gutiérrez	Actress	The Children's Trust	Eliminated (Day 49) th on November 12, 2011
Puerto Rico	Erik Estrada	Actor	Smile Train	Third place (Day 57) on November 20, 2011
Mexico	Prisila Angel	Singer	Trekking for Kids	Second place (Day 57) on November 20, 2011
Puerto Rico	Adamari Lopez	Actress	Susan G. Komen for the Cure	Winner on November 20, 2011

== Scores ==
Contestant	Place	3	4	5	6	7	8	9	10	Finale
Adamari López	Winner	1st	6th	6th	2nd	5th	2nd	2nd	2nd	Winner
Prisila Angel	Runner-up	5th	1st	1st	6th	2nd	1st	1st	1st	2nd Place
Erik Estrada	3rd Place	7th	5th	5th	3rd	3rd	3rd	4th	3rd	3rd Place
Elizabeth Gutiérrez	4th place	8th	8th	7th	4th	4th	4th	3rd	E	
Jose Manuel Figueroa	5th place	3rd	3rd	3rd	1st	1st	E			
Christian Suarez	6th place	6th	4th	4th	5th	E				
Alejandro Chabán	7th place	4th	2nd	2nd	E					
Blue Demon Jr.	8th place	2nd	7th	E						
Géraldine Bazán	9th place	9th	E							
Stephanie Salas	10th place	E								

Red numbers indicate the lowest score for each week.
Green numbers indicate the highest score for each week.
indicates the couple eliminated that week.
indicates the couple withdrew from the competition.
indicates the couple that was safe but withdrew from the competition.
indicates the winning couple.
indicates the runner-up couple.
indicates the third-place couple.

== Call-Out Order ==
Judge's Call-Out Order
Order	Episodes											
Order	Top 10	2	3	4	5	6	7	8	9	10	Finale	
1	Erik	Adamari	Adamari	Pricila	Pricila	Jose Manuel	Jose Manuel	Pricila	Adamari	Pricila	Pricila	Adamari
2	Stephanie	Blue	Pricila	Alejandro	Alejandro	Adamari	Pricila	Adamari	Elizabeth	Adamari	Adamari	Pricila
3	Alejandro	Alejandro	Jose Manuel	Jose Manuel	Jose Manuel	Erik	Erik	Erik	Priscila	Erik	Erik	
4	Elizabeth	Pricila	Alejandro	Christian	Christian	Elizabeth	Elizabeth	Elizabeth	Erik	Elizabeth		
5	Blue	Jose Manuel	Erik	Erik	Erik	Christian	Adamari	Jose Manuel				
6	Pricila	Christian	Christian	Adamari	Adamari	Pricila	Christian					
7	Christian	Erik	Blue	Blue	Elizabeth	Alejandro						
8	Geraldine	Elizabeth	Elizabeth	Elizabeth	Blue							
9	Jose Manuel	Geraldine	Geraldine	Geraldine								
10	Adamari	Stephanie	Stephanie									

- Week 1–2 were duel weeks, with no actual eliminations.
- Week 9, all celebrities were immune from elimination, making them go to semi-finals automatically.

Color	Description	Used
	The contestant won the competition	Top 2
	The contestant won second place	Top 2
	The contestant was eliminated	Week 3-Finale
	The contestant was immune from elimination	Week 2 & 9
	The contestant was saved by fellow contestants	Week 2
	The contestant was nominated for upcoming elimination	Week 2
	The contestant was saved by the viewers vote	Week 1–8 & 10

== Averages ==
This table only counts dances scored on the traditional 30-point scale.

RBN/D	Place	Couple	NOD	NOM
1	2	Pricila Angel	26	1
2	1	Adamari López	27	1
3	5	Jose Manuel Figueroa	17	1
4	7	Alejandro Chabán	8	1
5	4	Elizabeth Gutiérrez	32	4
6	3	Erik Estrada	21	1
7	6	Christian Suarez	8	1
8	9	Géraldine Bazán	5	2
9	8	Blue Demon Jr.	6	1
10	10	Stephanie Salas	3	1

- RBN/D: Rank by Number of Dances/Nominations
- NOD: Number of Dances
- NOM: Number of Nominations
