= Mira quién baila (American TV series) season 1 =

Mira quién baila
- Season 1
- Celebrity winner: Vadhir Derbez
- Professional winner: Soyarin Villairuta
- No. of episodes: 11

Release
- Original network: Univision
- Original release: September 12 – November 21, 2010

Season chronology
- Next → Mira Quien Baila 2011

Season one of Mira quién baila premiered on Univision on September 12, 2010 and ended on November 21, 2010. The TV series is the Spanish version of British version Strictly Come Dancing and American Version Dancing with the Stars (American TV series). Ten celebrities are paired with ten professional ballroom dancers. Javier Posa and Chiquinquirá Delgado are the hosts for this season.

== Judges ==
Judge	Occupation	Week
Bianca Marroquín	Broadway Dancer	Week 1 – Week 11
Horacio Villalobos	Choreographer	Week 1 – Week 11
Lili Estefan	El Gordo y la Flaca presenter	Week 7 – Week 11
Alejandra Guzmán	Singer, Dancer	Week 1–4 and 6
Javier "Poty" Castillo	Mira Quien Baila Choreographer	Week 5

== The Celebrities ==
Nationality	Celebrity	Occupation	Charity	Status
Puerto Rico	Héctor Camacho	Former Boxing Champion	IWMF	Eliminated (Day 35) on October 3, 2010
Mexico	Rosa Gloria Chagoyán	Actress "Lola la Trailera"	MALDEF	Eliminated (Day 42) on October 10, 2010
Cuba	Niurka Marcos	Actress and Model	Línea Nacional sobre Violencia Doméstica	Withdrew (Day 42) on October 17, 2010
Uruguay	Marcelo Buquet	Actor and Singer	DKMS Americas	Eliminated (Day 49) on October 24, 2010
Cuba	Jon Secada	Latin Grammy Award Winning Singer	Mission St. Francis	Withdrew (Day 49) on October 24, 2010
Venezuela	Scarlet Ortiz	Television Actress & Presenter	St. Jude Children's Research Hospital	Eliminated (Day 56) on November 7, 2010
Mexico	Diana Reyes	Premios Juventud Winning Singer	Make-A-Wish Foundation	Eliminated (Day 63) on November 14, 2010
Mexico	Rogelio Martínez	Latin Grammy Award Winning Singer	American Red Cross	Third Place (Day 70) on November 21, 2010
Puerto Rico	Jackie Guerrido	Primer Impacto Weather Anchor	Mujeres Desamparadas	Second Place (Day 70) on November 21, 2010
Mexico	Vadhir Derbez	Actor	ASPIRA	Winner on November 21, 2010

== Professionals ==
Professional	Country
Henri Velandia	Cuba
Cristian Santiago	Puerto Rico
Juventino Mendoza	Cuba
Livan Dominguez	Cuba
Danilo Suarez	Cuba
Lisa Marie Cordoba	Ecuador/Colombia
Giovanni Velazquez	Estados Unidos/Cuba
Soyarin Villairuta	Cuba
Arismary Garbey	Cuba
Not Credited: Andrew; Daniel

== Scores ==
Team	Place	4	5	6	7	8	9	10	Finale
Vadhir Derbez	1	1st	1st	3rd	2nd	2nd	2nd	2nd	1st Place
Jackie Guerrido	2	2nd	8th	7th	3rd	5th	4th	3rd	2nd Place
Rogelio Martínez	3	3rd	2nd	1st	1st	1st	1st	1st	3rd Place
Diana Reyes	4	8th	6th	4th	4th	3rd	3rd	E	
Scarlet Ortiz	5	7th	4th	6th	5th	4th	E		
Jon Secada	6	4th	3rd	2nd	WD				
Marcelo Buquet	7	9th	5th	5th	E				
Niurka Marcos	8	6th	7th	WD					
Rosa Gloria Chagoyán	9	5th	E						
Héctor Camacho	10	E							

Red numbers indicate the lowest score for each week.
Green numbers indicate the highest score for each week.
indicates the couple eliminated that week.
indicates the couple withdrew from the competition.
indicates the couple that was safe but withdrew from the competition.
indicates the winning couple.
indicates the runner-up couple.
indicates the third-place couple.

== Call-Out Order ==
Judge's Call-Out Order
Order	Episodes									
Order	Top 10	4	5	6	7	8	9	10	Finale	
1	Hector	Vadhir	Vadhir	Rogelio	Rogelio	Rogelio	Rogelio	Rogelio	Vadhir	Vadhir
2	Rosa	Jackie	Rogelio	Jon	Vadhir	Vadhir	Vadhir	Vadhir	Jackie	Jackie
3	Jon	Rogelio	Jon	Vadhir	Jackie	Diana	Diana	Jackie	Rogelio	
4	Diana	Jon	Scarlet	Diana	Diana	Scarlet	Jackie	Diana		
5	Vadhir	Rosa	Marcelo	Marcelo	Scarlet	Jackie	Scarlet			
6	Scarlet	Niurka	Diana	Scarlet	Jon					
7	Rogelio	Scarlet	Niurka	Jackie	Marcelo					
8	Jackie	Diana	Jackie	Niurka						
9	Marcelo	Marcelo	Rosa							
10	Niurka	Hector								

- Week 1–3 were duel weeks, with no actual eliminations.
- Week 8 is a non elimination week, due to a double eviction the previous week.
- Week 8 worst dances were Jackie and Scarlet.
- Week 9 Rogelio and Vadhir were given the advance ticket to go to the Finale.
- Week 10 Even though Diana had better scores she was eliminated.

Color	Description	Used
	The contestant won the competition	Top 2
	The contestant won second place	Top 2
	The contestant was eliminated	Top 10-Finale
	The contestant was nominated and quit	Week 7
	The contestant was saved by the viewers vote	Week 4–6&9–10
	The contestant quit the competition	Week 6

== Averages ==
This table only counts dances scored on the traditional 30-point scale.

RBN/D	Place	Couple	NOD	NOM
2	1	Vadhir Derbez	16	0
5	2	Jackie Guerrido	18	4
1	3	Rogelio Martínez	14	0
3	4	Diana Reyes	14	1
4	5	Scarlet Ortiz	13	1
6	6	Jon Secada	9	1
8	7	Marcelo Buquet	8	2
7	8	Niurka Marcos	10	1
9	9	Rosa Gloria Chagoyán	6	1
10	10	Hector Camacho	5	1

- RBN/D: Rank by Number of Dances/Nominations
- NOD: Number of Dances
- NOM: Number of Nominations

== Dances performed ==
Team	1		2		3		4		5		6		7		8		9		10		Finale	
Vadhir Derbez	Rock & Roll		Disco	Adagio	Tango		Salsa		Urban Dance		Regional Mexicano		Brazilian Dance	Cumbia	Waltz		Bachata	Disco	Quick Step	Merengue	Regional Mexicano	Quick Step/Pop
Jackie Guerrido	Adagio		Samba	Quickstep	Broadway		Regional Mexicano	Salsa	Foxtrot^{1}	ND^{2}	Waltz		Urban Dance	Paso Doble	Cha-Cha-Chá	Rock & Roll	Cumbia	Brazilian Dance	Pop	Adagio	Merengue	Disco
Rogelio Martínez	Pop	Broadway	Bachata		Salsa		Merengue		Rock & Roll		Disco		Tango	Brazilian Dance	Regional Mexicano		Adagio		Salsa	Rock & Roll	Bachata	Eliminated
Diana Reyes	Pop		Disco		Paso Doble		Rock & Roll		Bachata	Broadway	Merengue		Cumbia	Tango	Adagio	Brazilian Dance	Merengue	Cha-Cha-Chá	Regional Mexicano	Eliminated		Merengue
Scarlet Ortiz	Merengue	Tango	Salsa		Rock & Roll		Pop		Vallenato		Urban Dance	Quickstep	Broadway	Rock & Roll	Disco	Foxtrot	Regional Mexicano	Eliminated				Samba
Jon Secada	Regional Mexicano	Brazilian Dance	Salsa	Quickstep	Disco		Tango		Adagio		Cha-Cha-Chá	Pop	Withdrew									
Marcelo Buquet	Merengue		Cha Cha Chá		Cumbia	Tango	Disco		Regional Mexicano		Bachata	Adagio	Eliminated									Tango
Niurka Marcos	Rock & Roll	Cumbia	Urban Dance	Regional Mexicano	Waltz		Brazilian Dance	Bachata	Disco	Tango	Withdrew											
Rosa Gloria Chagoyán	Regional Mexicano		Cha Cha Chá	Paso Doble	Urban Dance		Adagio	Merengue	Eliminated													Paso Doble
Hector Camacho	Adagio	Salsa	Urban Dance		Merengue	Regional Mexicano	Eliminated															Salsa

Performed in finale but not scored
First Place Dance-Off
Elimination Dance-Off
Safe from the Elimination Dance-Off

== Notes ==
^1 Due to a back injury sustained in the rehearsal for the October 10 show, Guerrido was medically disqualified from dancing in the live show the same evening; the Foxtrot, while rehearsed, was never performed competitively.

^2 Guerrido couldn't perform on the October 10 show, that's why she was nominated automatically.

== Dance schedule ==
The celebrities and professional partners danced one of these routines for each corresponding week.

Dances
Order	Weeks											
Order	Dances	1	2	3	4	5	6	7	8	9	10	Finale
1	Rock & Roll	Yes	No	Yes	Yes	Yes	No	Yes	Yes	No	Yes	No
2	Adagio	Yes	Yes	No	Yes	Yes	Yes	No	Yes	Yes	Yes	No
3	Pop	Yes	No	No	Yes	No	Yes	No	No	No	Yes	Yes
4	Merengue	Yes	No	Yes	Yes	No	Yes	No	No	Yes	Yes	Yes
5	Regional Mexicano	Yes	Yes	Yes	Yes	Yes	Yes	Yes	Yes	Yes	Yes	Yes
6	Disco	No	Yes	No	Yes	Yes	Yes	No	Yes	Yes	No	Yes
7	Bachata	No	Yes	No	Yes	Yes	Yes	No	Yes	Yes	No	Yes
8	Broadway	Yes	No	Yes	No	Yes	No	Yes	No	No	No	No
9	Tango	Yes	No	Yes	Yes	Yes	No	Yes	No	No	No	No
10	Brazilian Dance	Yes	Yes	No	Yes	No	No	Yes	Yes	Yes	No	No
11	Cha Cha Chá	No	Yes	No	No	No	Yes	No	Yes	Yes	No	No
12	Cumbia	Yes	No	Yes	No	No	No	Yes	No	Yes	No	No
13	Salsa	Yes	Yes	Yes	Yes	No	No	No	No	No	Yes	No
14	Paso Doble	No	Yes	Yes	No	No	No	Yes	No	No	No	No
15	Urban Dance	No	Yes	Yes	No	Yes	Yes	Yes	No	No	No	No
16	Quickstep	No	Yes	No	No	No	Yes	No	No	No	Yes	Yes
17	Waltz	No	No	Yes	No	No	Yes	No	Yes	No	No	No
18	Vallenato	No	No	No	No	Yes	No	No	No	No	No	No
19	Foxtrot	No	No	No	No	Yes	No	No	Yes	No	No	No

- Various contestants dance the same dance routine.
- Regional Mexicano was the only dance that was performed each week throughout the competition
- Vallenato was the only dance, that was performed only once throughout the competition

Color	Description
No	The dance was not performed
Yes	The dance was performed
