= Mira quién baila (American TV series) season 3 =

Mira quién baila
- Season 3
- Winner: Henry Santos
- No. of episodes: 11

Release
- Original network: Univision
- Original release: September 9 – November 18, 2012

Season chronology
- ← Previous; Mira Quien Baila 2011 Next → Mira Quien Baila 2013

Mira Quien Baila (also known as Mira Quien Baila 2012 and Mira Quien Baila 3) debuted on Univision on September 9, 2012 at 8pm central. The TV series is the Spanish version of British version Strictly Come Dancing and American Version Dancing with the Stars (American TV series). Ten celebrities are paired with ten professional ballroom dancers. The winner will receive $150,000 for their charity. Javier Poza and Chiquinquirá Delgado are the hosts for this season.

== Judges ==
Judge	Occupation	Week
Horacio Villalobos	TV host and actor	(Season 1-Present)
Lili Estefan	TV host of El Gordo y La Flaca	(Season 1-Present)
Bianca Marroquin	Musical theatre Dancer, Singer, Actress and Judge on Pequenos Gigantes	(Season 1-Present)
Javier "Poty" Castillo	Mira quién baila choreographer	(Season 1-Present)

== The celebrities ==
Nationality	Celebrity	Known for	Charity	Status
Mexico	Valentina	Regional Mexican Singer	Mariachi Academy of New York	Eliminated 1st on September 23, 2012
Cuba	Samy	Stylist to the Stars	American Cancer Society	Eliminated 2nd on September 30, 2012
Mexico	María Antonieta de las Nieves	International Comedian La Chilindrina	Amigos For Kids	Eliminated 3rd on October 7, 2012
Spain	Maxi Iglesias	Actor & Model, best known for acting on Física o Química	American Childhood Cancer Organization	Eliminated 4th on October 14, 2012
Puerto Rico	Maripily Rivera	Entertainer, Model and Entrepreneur	March of Dimes	Eliminated 5th on October 21, 2012
Mexico	Argelia Atilano	Radio Personality - K-LOVE 107.5 FM	Hispanic Scholarship Fund	Eliminated 6th on November 4, 2012
Mexico	Bobby Pulido	Regional Mexican Singer	Vannie Cook Jr. Children’s Cancer and Hematology Clinic	Eliminated 7th on November 11, 2012
Venezuela	Alicia Machado	Miss Universe 1996 & Actress	Alzheimer’s Association	Third Place on November 18, 2012
Mexico	Fernando Arau	Comedian, Former Despierta America Host	His House Children’s Home	Second Place on November 18, 2012
Dominican Republic	Henry Santos	Bachata Singer and former member of Aventura	National Latino Children’s Institute	Winner on November 18, 2012

== Scores ==
Contestant	Place	3	4	5	6	7	8	9	10	Finale
Henry Santos	1	1st	1st	2nd	3rd	4th	2nd	3rd	1st	Winner
Fernando Arau	2	4th	6th	7th	6th	6th	4th	2nd	3rd	2nd Place
Alicia Machado	3	5th	5th	3rd	2nd	3rd	5th	1st	2nd	3rd Place
Bobby Pulido	4	2nd	2nd	5th	4th	5th	3rd	4th	E	
Argelia Atilano	5	7th	8th	1st	5th	2nd	1st	E		
Maripily Rivera	6	3rd	4th	4th	1st	1st	E			
Maxi Iglesias	7	5th	3rd	6th	E					
María Antonieta de las Nieves	8	9th	7th	E						
Samy	9	8th	E							
Valentina	10	E								

Red numbers indicate the lowest score for each week.
Green numbers indicate the highest score for each week.
indicates the couple eliminated that week.
indicates the couple withdrew from the competition.
indicates the couple that was safe but withdrew from the competition.
indicates the winning couple.
indicates the runner-up couple.
indicates the third-place couple.

== Call-Out Order ==
Judge's Call-Out Order
Order	Episodes										
Order	Top 10	2	3	4	5	6	7	8	9	10	Finale
1	Valentina	Fernando	Henry	Henry	Argelia	Maripily	Maripily	Argelia	Alicia	Henry	Henry
2	Bobby	Henry	Bobby	Bobby	Henry	Alicia	Argelia	Henry	Fernando	Alicia	Fernando
3	Alicia	Bobby	Maripily	Maxi	Alicia	Henry	Alicia	Bobby	Henry	Fernando	Alicia
4	Henry	Maripily	Fernando	Maripily	Maripily	Bobby	Henry	Fernando	Bobby	Bobby	
5	Fernando	Maxi	Alicia	Alicia	Bobby	Henry	Bobby	Alicia	Argelia		
6	Maria	Alicia	Maxi	Fernando	Maxi	Fernando	Fernando	Maripily			
7	Sammy	Argelia	Argelia	Maria	Fernando	Maxi					
8	Maripily	Sammy	Sammy	Argelia	Maria						
9	Maxi	Maria	Maria	Sammy							
10	Argelia	Valentina	Valentina								

- Week 1-2 were duel weeks, with no actual eliminations.
- Week 9, all celebrities were immune from elimination, making them go to semifinals automatically.

Color	Description	Used
	The contestant won the competition	Top 2
	The contestant won second place	Top 2
	The contestant was in third place	Top 3
	The contestant was eliminated	Week 3-Finale
	The contestant was immune from elimination	Week 2 & 9
	The contestant was saved by fellow contestants	Week 2
	The contestant was nominated for upcoming elimination	Week 2 & 7
	The contestant was saved by the viewers vote	Week 1-8 & 10
	The contestant was the only one in bottom, but was saved by votes	Week 7
