= Mira quién baila (American TV series) season 10 =

Mira quién baila
- Season 10
- Winner: María León
- No. of episodes: 6

Release
- Original network: Univision
- Original release: October 9 – November 20, 2022

Season chronology
- ← Previous; Season 9 Next → Season 11

The tenth season of Mira quién baila, also known as Mira quién baila All Stars premiered on Univision on October 9, 2022. The TV series is the American Spanish-language version of British version Strictly Come Dancing and American version Dancing with the Stars. This season features eight celebrities that are paired with eight professional ballroom dancers. The winner will receive a grand prize donation to the charity of their choice. Chiquinquirá Delgado returned as the show's host. Mane de la Parra joined as co-host, replacing Borja Voces. A new panel of judges was introduced, formed by Paulina Rubio, Isaac Hernández, and Roselyn Sánchez, replacing Dayanara Torres, Casper Smart, and Patricia Manterola. Sherlyn, contestant from the seventh season, is a backstage reporter. The winner, María León, received $35,000 for her chosen charity.

== Celebrities ==
The celebrities were announced on October 3, 2022.

Nationality	Celebrity	Notability	Charity	Status
Venezuela	Gabriel Coronel	Actor & singer	Amigos For Kids	Withdrew on October 16, 2022
Mexico	Michelle González	Actress	United Cerebral Palsy	Eliminated on October 23, 2022
Costa Rica	Brenda Kellerman	Actress & television personality	Safe Kids Worldwide	Eliminated on November 6, 2022
Mexico	Ferdinando Valencia	Actor	Amhiga Hispana	Eliminated on November 13, 2022
Mexico	Miguel Martínez	Actor & singer	US Against Alzheimer's	Eliminated on November 13, 2022
Mexico	Jorge Anzaldo	Social media personality & dancer	Proyecto Inmigrante	Third place on November 20, 2022
Puerto Rico	Ana Isabelle	Actress & dancer	March of Dimes Puerto Rico	Runner-up on November 20, 2022
Mexico	María León	Singer & dancer	The Resource Foundation	Winner on November 20, 2022

== Ratings ==
Episode		Air date	Viewers (millions)
1	"Week 1"	October 9, 2022	1.35
2	"Week 2"	October 16, 2022	1.38
3	"Week 3"	October 23, 2022	1.31
4	"Week 4"	November 6, 2022	1.15
5	"Semifinal"	November 13, 2022	1.31
6	"Final"	November 20, 2022	1.39
