= Mira quién baila (American TV series) season 9 =

Mira quién baila
- Season 9
- Winner: Jesus Díaz "Chef Yisus"
- No. of episodes: 6

Release
- Original network: Univision
- Original release: March 14 – April 18, 2021

Season chronology
- ← Previous; Season 8 Next → Season 10

The ninth season of Mira quién baila, also known as Mira quién baila Univision All Stars premiered on Univision on March 14, 2021. The TV series is the American spanish-language version of British version Strictly Come Dancing and American version Dancing with the Stars. This season features eight celebrities from Univision programs that are paired with eight professional ballroom dancers. The winner received a grand prize donation to the charity of their choice. Chiquinquirá Delgado returned as the show's host. Borja Voces joined as co-host, replacing Javier Poza. Dayanara Torres and Casper Smart returned as judges. Patricia Manterola joined as a judge, replacing Bianca Marroquín. Kiara Liz, contestant from the previous season, is a backstage reporter. The winner, Chef Yisus, received $30,000 for his chosen charity.

== Celebrities ==
The celebrities were announced on February 25, 2021.

Nationality	Celebrity	Univision program	Charity	Status
Honduras	Mariajosé Alvarado	Enamorándonos	CARECEN LA	Eliminated on March 21, 2021
Mexico	Víctor González	Quererlo todo	No Kid Hungry	Eliminated on March 28, 2021
Dominican Republic	Tony Dandrades	Primer Impacto	Afro-Latino Association for Policy & Advocacy	Eliminated on April 4, 2021
Venezuela	Lindsay Casinelli	República Deportiva	United We Dream	Eliminated on April 11, 2021
Mexico	Sylvia Del Valle "La Bronca"	El Free-Guey Show	CHIRLA	Fourth place on April 18, 2021
Cuba	Roberto Hernandez	Enamorándonos	Amhiga Hispana	Third place on April 18, 2021
Puerto Rico	Aleyda Ortiz	¡Despierta América!	Hogar Ruth	Second place on April 18, 2021
Venezuela	Jesus Díaz "Chef Yisus"	¡Despierta América!	Amigos For Kids	Winner on April 18, 2021

== Ratings ==
Episode		Air date	Viewers (millions)
1	"Week 1"	March 14, 2021	1.8
2	"Week 2"	March 21, 2021	1.6
3	"Week 3"	March 28, 2021	1.5
4	"Week 4"	April 4, 2021	1.2
5	"Semifinal"	April 11, 2021	1.5
6	"Final"	April 18, 2021	1.7
