= Pequeños Gigantes =

Pequeños Gigantes may refer to:

- Pequeños Gigantes (Mexican TV series), a Mexican reality talent show
- Pequeños Gigantes USA, a Spanish-language reality talent show
