= Pequeños Gigantes (Mexican TV series) =

- Genre: Talent show
- Created by: Rubén Galindo; Santiago Galindo
- Directed by: Eduardo Suárez
- Presented by: Galilea Montijo; Jimena Gállego (seasons 1-2); Yurem Rojas (seasons 1-2); Bárbara Islas (season 4)
- Country of origin: Mexico
- Original language: Spanish
- No. of seasons: 5
- No. of episodes: 52

Production
- Executive producers: Rubén Galindo; Santiago Galindo
- Producers: Miguel Batz; Fabián Flores
- Production company: Televisa

Original release
- Network: Las Estrellas; Univision
- Release: 27 March 2011 – 5 April 2020

Pequeños Gigantes (English title: Little Giants) is a Mexican reality talent show that premiered on Las Estrellas 27 March 2011. The talent show televises groups of talented children from various Hispanic countries including the United States (each group comprises four children) competing against each other to receive the highest ranking at the end of each program, and for the first place and the grand prize. Each group has one captain, one singer, and two dancers. Six judges give each child category a rating based from 1 to 10.

== Hosts and Judges ==
The first season premiered on 27 March 2011 hosted by Galilea Montijo, Jimena Gállego, And Yurem Rojas. The judges were Bianca Marroquín, María José, Manuel "Flaco" Ibáñez, Pierre Angelo, Noel Schajris and Raquel Ortega. For the second season, Schajris and Angelo didn't return and saw Fanny Lú and Arath de la Torre as their replacements. In 2018, a third season was announced with Adrián Di Monte, Lupe Esparza, Nacho and Ariel Miramontes as the new judges joining three-season veterans Marroquín and Ibañez. Season four saw a reduction of judges from six to four. Miramontes was the only one returning from the previous season joined by Karol Sevilla, Verónica Castro and Miguel Bosé. For the fifth season, Miramontes returned once again, for his third season with María León, Bibi Gaytán and Juanpa Zurita. Montijo has served for all five season as host.

Hosts & Judges of Pequeños gigantes
| | Seasons | | | | |
| | 1 | 2 | 3 | 4 | 5 |
|---|---|---|---|---|---|
| Galilea Montijo | Host | | | | |
| Jimena Gállego | Host | | | | |
| Yurem Rojas | Host | | | | |
| Bianca Marroquín | Judge | | | | |
| Manuel "Flaco" Ibáñez | Judge | | | | |
| María José | Judge | | | | |
| Raquel Ortega | Judge | | | | |
| Noel Schajris | Judge | | | | |
| Pierre Angelo | Judge | | | | |
| Gloria Trevi | Adviser | | | | |
| Fanny Lú | | Judge | | | |
| Arath de la Torre | | Judge | | | |
| Lupe Esparza | | | Judge | | |
| Adrián Di Monte | | | Judge | | |
| Ariel "Albertano" Miramontes | | | Judge | | |
| Nacho | | | Judge | | |
| Bárbara Islas | | | | Host | |
| Verónica Castro | | | | Judge | |
| Miguel Bosé | | | | Judge | |
| Karol Sevilla | | | | Judge | |
| María León | | | | | Judge |
| Juanpa Zurita | | | | | Judge |
| Bibi Gaytán | | | | | Judge |

== Seasons ==
=== Season 1 (2011) ===
Season one premiered on Las Estrellas on 27 March 2011 and concluded on 24 July 2011. On Univision the season premiere on 19 June 2011 and concluded on 5 September 2011. Galilea Montijo, Jimena Gállego, and Yurem Rojas are hosts for this season. The judges of this season are Bianca Marroquín, María José, Manuel "Flaco" Ibáñez, Raquel Ortega, Noel Schajris, and Pierre Angelo. In this season seven teams of four children compete for the grand prize of 2 million MXN pesos to be distributed among the four team members, a trophy, and the singer of the team would sing a song with Gloria Trevi.

The winning team of this season is Los Irresistibles consisting of Javier Ruíz, Miguel Angel Romero, Daryna González, and Jorge del Valle.

| Team name | Captain | Singer | Dancers | Placement |
|---|---|---|---|---|
| Los Irresistibles | Javier Ruiz | Miguel Ángel | Jorge del Valle & Daryna Gonzalez | 1st |
| Los Megaestrellas | Grecia Sánchez | Luis Hiroshi Akriado | Karla Rodriguez Maciel & Jesús Ruiz | 2nd |
| Los Rebeldes | Montserrat García | Magaby Garay | Ylenia Jaramillo & Gerardo Hernandez | 3rd |
| Los Superpeques | Carlos Yumbe | Joselyn Tiburcio | Michel Gómez & David Díaz | 4th |
| Los Superpoderosos | Ana Celeste Pena | Carlos Bernal | Diana Valeria & José Armando Rodriguez | 5th |
| Pequeños Guerreros | Gema Nicte-Ha | José Luis Rivera | Nicole Chavez & Andres Maceda Mojica | 6th |
| Gigantes en Acción | Dana Valeria | Mariana Lopez | Zhiria Burgos & Adolfo Mauricio Romero | 7th |

=== Season 2 (2012) ===
Season two premiered on Las Estrellas on 15 April 2012 and concluded on 15 July 2012. On Univision the season premiere on 3 June 2012 and concluded on 2 September 2012. Galilea Montijo and Jimena Gállego returned as hosts. Bianca Marroquín, María José, Manuel "Flaco" Ibáñez, and Raquel Ortega returned as judges. Fanny Lu and Arath de la Torre replaced Noel Schajris and Pierre Angelo as judges. In this season seven teams of four children compete for the grand prize of a trophy and 2 million MXN pesos to be distributed among the four team members.

The winning team of this season is Mega Estrellas consisting of Rogelio Cruz, Irlanda Valenzuela, Gretchen Rojas, and Max Kozelchik.

| Team name | Captain | Singer | Dancers | Placement |
|---|---|---|---|---|
| Megaestrellas | Rogelio Cruz | Irlanda Valenzuela | Gretchen Rojas & Max Kozelchik | 1st |
| Los Irresistibles | Fátima Zurita | Josafat Silva | Athena Cruz & Rommel del Río | 2nd |
| Los Superpeques | Nazli Prieto | Toñito Ramírez | Melissa Méndez & Jarek Hernández | 3rd |
| Los Superpoderosos | André Real | Dania González | Altahir Kozelchik & Jorge Romero | 4th |
| Pequeños Guerreros | Saraí Pacheco | Kenia Feria | Nicole Cardona & Erick Zapata | 5th |
| Gigantes en Acción | Miguel Cazares | Bridget González | Dariana Pimentel & Edson Morin | 6th |
| Los Rebeldes | Karla Torres | Jesús Cantú | Alexa González & Aoki Castelan | 7th |

=== Season 3 (2018) ===
Season three premiered on 25 February 2018 and concluded on 29 April 2018. This is the first season to air simultaneously on Las Estrellas and Univision. Galilea Montijo and Jimena Gállego returned as the hosts. Bianca Marroquín and Manuel "Flaco" Ibáñez returned as judges. Lupe Esparza, Adrián Di Monte, Nacho, and Ariel Miramontes "Albertano" replaced María José, Raquel Ortega, Fanny Lu, and Arath de la Torre as judges. In this season six teams of four children compete for the grand prize of 1 million MXN pesos to be distributed among the four team members.

The winning team of this season is Los Super Powers consisting of Natalia Gomez, Rodrigo Perez "Canelito", Jazlyn Quintero, and Aramis Ojeda.

| Team name | Captain | Singer | Dancers | Placement |
|---|---|---|---|---|
| Los Super Powers | Natalia Gomez | Rodrigo Perez "Canelito" | Jazlyn Quintero & Aramis Ojeda | 1st |
| Los Conquistadores | Nayleah Vanessa Ramón Santos | Anyelique Solorio | Gabrielly Palacio & Kenish Aquino | 2nd |
| Los Pequeños Guerreros | Yumalay Díaz | Valeria Rodrigrez | Luisangeli Espinoza & Diego Rodriguez | 3rd |
| Los Peque Estrellas | Saith Maya "Morokito" | Abril Medina | Andrea Rosales & Patricio Lopez | 4th |
| Los Dinamitas | Amanda Munguia | Nuria Loya | Marcela Guerrero & Oscar Villareal | 5th |
| Los Adorables | Anahi Ledezma | Camila Álvarez | Ximena Sánchez & Ray Báez | 6th |

=== Season 4 (2019) ===
Season four premiered on 24 March 2019, and concluded on 26 May 2019. On Univision the season concluded on 2 June 2019. Auditions were held in February 2019. Galilea Montijo returned as host. Bárbara Islas joined as co-host. The number of judges was reduced from six to four. Ariel Miramontes "Albertano" returned as judge. Verónica Castro, Miguel Bosé, and Karol Sevilla replaced Lupe Esparza, Adrián Di Monte, Nacho, Bianca Marroquín, and Manuel "Flaco" Ibáñez as judges. This is the first season to include extraordinary physical abilities as a talent and the child is called the "Quinto Elemento" (Fifth Element). In this season six teams of five children compete for the grand prize of 1,200,000 MXN pesos to be distributed among each other.

The winning team of this season is Giovani y los saca chispas consisting of Giovani Chávez, Rafael Salazar, Sara Alejos, Yamil Ibáñez, and Mariana Olvera.

| Team name | Captain | Singer | Dancers | Quinto Elemento | Placement |
|---|---|---|---|---|---|
| Giovani y los saca chispas | Giovani Chávez | Rafael Salazar | Sara Alejos & Yamil Ibáñez | Mariana Olvera | 1st |
| Mateo y los Súper Sabios | Mateo Figueroa | Taisia Sigala | Flor Santander & Yahir Solís | Jenifer Quezada | 2nd |
| Beba y sus yolotzin | Piera Renata Cuervo "Beba" | Kevin Duarte | Valeria Vallado & Ramón Leyva | Sofía Marie | 3rd |
| Sarilú y sus bombas | Sara Lucía Castillo "Sarilú" | Kenneth Lagunes | Regina Espejo & Paulo Fonseca | Josue Basilio | 4th |
| Danna y los Súper Fashion | Danna Zermeño | Sofía González | Rubén del Prado & Mariana Ruiz | Sergio Antonio Andrade | 5th |
| Victoria y sus victoriosos | Victoria Quintero | Roberto Carlos Olán | Tadeo López & Venuz Arce | Ethan Joseph | 6th |

=== Season 5 (2020) ===
Season five premiered on Univision on 22 March 2020. Galilea Montijo returned as host. Ariel Miramontes "Albertano" returned as judge. María León, Bibi Gaytán and Juanpa Zurita replaced Verónica Castro, Miguel Bosé, and Karol Sevilla as judges. On 27 March 2020, Univision announced an early end to production on the season due to the COVID-19 pandemic in Mexico, with only three audition episodes being produced. The season finale aired on 5 April 2020.

== Ratings ==
=== U.S. ratings ===
| Season | Timeslot (ET) | Season premiere | | Season finale | |
| Season | Timeslot (ET) | Date | Viewers (millions) | Date | Viewers (millions) |
|---|---|---|---|---|---|
| 1 | Sunday 8pm/7c | 19 June 2011 | 4.2 | 5 September 2011 | 6.2 |
| 2 | Sunday 8pm/7c | 2 June 2012 | 4.2 | 2 September 2012 | 3.1 |
| 3 | Sunday 8pm/7c | 25 February 2018 | 2.5 | 29 April 2018 | 2.4 |
| 4 | Sunday 8pm/7c | 24 March 2019 | 1.5 | 2 June 2019 | 1.9 |
| 5 | Sunday 8pm/7c | 22 March 2020 | 2.3 | 5 April 2020 | 2.0 |

== International versions of Pequeños Gigantes ==
Currently airing franchise
Franchise with an upcoming season
Franchise whose status is unknown
Franchise no longer in production

| Country/region | Name | Network | Host(s) | Judges | Seasons and winners |
|---|---|---|---|---|---|
| Argentina | Pequeños Gigantes | Telefe | Susana Giménez | Martín Bossi; Cris Morena; Ricardo Montaner; Martina Stoessel | Season 1, 2019: Los Pequeños Guerreros; Season 2, 2019: ? |
| Chile | Pequeños Gigantes | Chilevisión | Carolina de Moras | Américo; Amaya Forch; Power Peralta | Season 1, 2015: Los Rebeldes |
| Costa Rica | Pequeños Gigantes | Teletica | Edgar Silva; Natalia Rodríguez | Flor Urbina; Nancy Dobles; José "Chepe" González; “Lalo” Rojas; Alejandra Portillo; Gustavo Rojas | Season 1, 2011: Estrellas Arrasadores |
| Ecuador | Pequeños Gigantes | Teleamazonas | Erick Méndez | Manuel "Flaco" Ibáñez; María José; Noel Schajris; Gloria Trevi | Season 1, 2012: Los Rebeldes |
| Hungary | Kicsi Óriások | RTL Klub | Balázs Sebestyén | Eszter Földes; Péter Geszti; Dávid Spáh | Season 1, 2016: Lázadók |
| Italy | Pequeños Gigantes; Piccoli giganti | Canale 5 Real Time | Belén Rodríguez (1); Gabriele Corsi (2) | Current; Benedetta Parodi (2); Enzo Miccio (2); Serena Rossi (2); Former; Claudio Amendola (1); Megan Montaner (1); Francesco Arca (1) | Season 1, 2016: I Piccoli Guerrieri; Season 2, 2017: Stelle Filanti |
| Panama | Pequeños Gigantes | Telemetro | Michelle Simons; Jackie Guzmán; Patty Castillo | Phatom; Any Tovar; Carlos Real; Jahenel Pitti; Margarita Henríquez; Ana Lucía Herrera | Season 1, 2012: Gigantes En Acción; Season 2, 2013: Super Peques |
| Paraguay | Pequeños Gigantes | Telefuturo | Dani Da Rosa | David Dionich; Clara Franco; Mili Britez; Nadia Portillho (2); Álvaro Ayala; Alicia Ramirez (1) | Season 1, 2014: Los Megas Talentosos; Season 2, 2014: Los Irresistibles |
| Peru | Pequeños Gigantes | América Televisión | Federico Salazar; Katia Condos | Denisse Dibós; Jesús Neyra; Karina Rivera; Ricky Tosso; Magdyel Ugaz | Season 1, 2012: Los Irresistibles |
| Poland | Mali giganci | TVN | Filip Chajzer | Agnieszka Chylińska (1–3); Kuba Wojewódzki (1–3); Katarzyna Bujakiewicz (1–2); Sonia Bohosiewicz (3) | Season 1, 2015: Klika Rubika; Season 2, 2016: Kadra Anki; Season 3, 2017: Pogodni |
| Portugal | Pequenos Gigantes | TVI | Fatima Lopes | Manuel Luis Goucha; Rita Pereira; David Carreira | Season 1, 2015: Os Rebeldes; Season 2, 2016: Os Sonhadores |
| Spain | Pequeños Gigantes | Telecinco | Jesús Vázquez | Mónica Naranjo (2); Florentino Fernández (2); Marbelys Zamora (2); Angy Fernández (1); Jorge Cadaval (1); Melody (1) | Season 1, 2014: Los Rebeldes; Season 2, 2015: Gigantes en acción |
| Ukraine | Маленькі гіганти Malenki giganti | 1+1 | Kateryna Osadcha | Yuriy Gorbunov; Natalia Mogilevskaya; Elena Soptenko | Season 1, 2015: ? |
| Uruguay | Pequeños Gigantes | Teledoce | ? | ? | Season 1, 2013: Pequeños Guerreros |
| United States | Pequeños Gigantes USA | Univision | Giselle Blondet | Bianca Marroquín; Luis Coronel; Prince Royce | Season 1, 2017: Peque Flow |
| Vietnam | Người Hùng Tí Hon | HTV7 | ? | ? | ? |
