= Giselle Blondet =

Puerto Rican actress and TV host

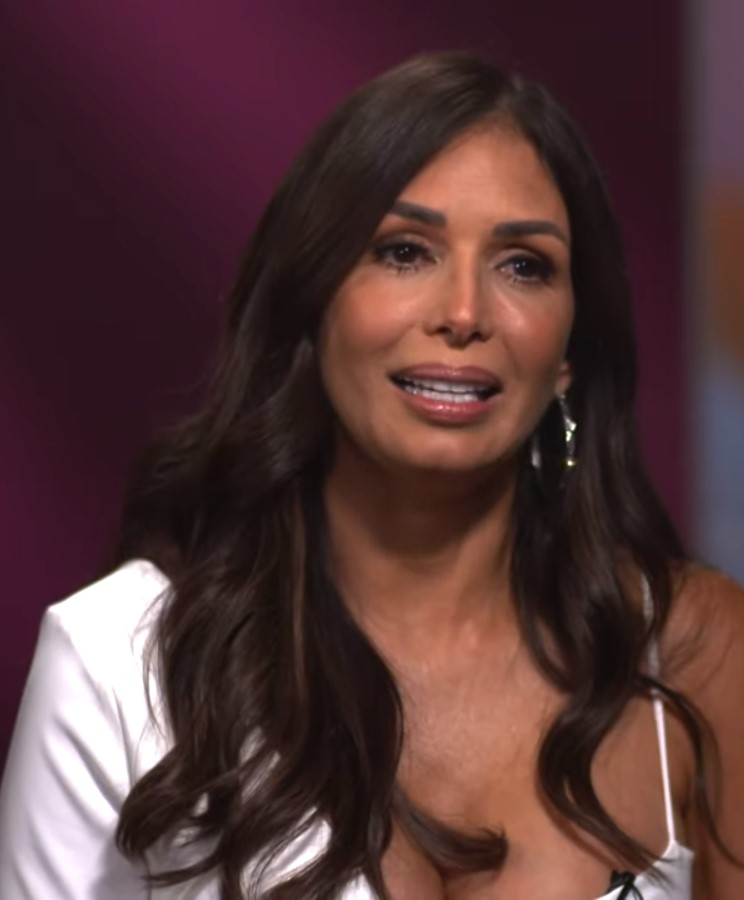
- Giselle Blondet (right) with Gloria Estefan at The Heart Truth fashion show in 2012
- Born: Alba Giselle Blondet Gomez; January 9, 1964 (age 62); New York City, U.S.
- Occupation: TV Hostess
- Spouses: Luis Iglesias (m. 1982; div. 1984) Luis Abreu (m. 1986; div. 1987) Harold Trucco (m. 1989; div. 1997)
- Children: 3

Alba Giselle Blondet Gomez (born January 9, 1964) is a Puerto Rican actress and TV host. She also founded the non-profit organization "Fundación Arte por La Paz".

== Early biography ==
Giselle Blondet was born Alba Giselle Blondet, in 1964, to Victor Manuel Blondet and Alba Gomez, in New York, New York, but was raised and studied in Puerto Rico.

In 1982 she married her first husband, jeweler Luis Iglesias, with whom she had a daughter, Andrea. They divorced two years later in 1984.

In 1986 she married again, this second time to actor Luis Abreu. That marriage did not last long, and they divorced shortly after. Blondet spent the rest of the late 1980s participating in different television shows, soap operas, and mini-series, as well as in some theater plays.

During the early 1990s, Blondet recorded a popular television commercial in Puerto Rico for the feminine hygiene brand, Always.

In 1989, she married for a third time, to Argentine producer Harold Trucco. They had a daughter, Gabriella, and a son, Harold Emmanuel. By way of that marriage, she was the sister-in-law of actor Ed Trucco. The relationship encountered problems and ended in 1997. In June 1997, her career took off internationally as she became co-host for Univision's international morning show, ¡Despierta América!, alongside Rafael José, Fernando Arau, Ana Maria Canseco, and Neida Sandoval. Since divorcing Trucco, she has remained single and says she wants to dedicate her free time to her children.

== Later career ==
In 2004, Blondet published her autobiography Con los Pies en la Tierra. The following year, she left Despierta América to host a new television show about real-life tragedies, entitled Historias Para Contar, but it resulted in a series of small special episodes. In 2006, she starred in a Spanish-language Christmas movie alongside José Feliciano and Raúl De Molina entitled Feliz Navidad. Blondet's movie was due to be released later that year, but was released to DVD. In 2007, she was given the opportunity to become the host of a reality show in Univision, called Nuestra Belleza Latina (Our Latin Beauty). The show has hints of American Idol, America's Next Top Model, and Miss Universe, and was an early hit.

In 2010, after 14 years away from acting, she starred in an episode of Mujeres Asesinas as Luz Maria, alongside Cynthia Klitbo in the episode "Luz, Arrolladora".

In February 2012, she was one of a group of celebrities who walked down a catwalk in red dresses for the 'Heart Truth Red Dress Collection' show, part of New York Fashion Week. She wore an Oscar de la Renta dress.

In December 2013, after hosting Univision's Nuestra Belleza Latina for seven years, she announced that she was leaving the hit show to pursue other opportunities and hoped to produce her own TV show in the future. Her role as host was taken over by Chiquinquirá Delgado.

In June 2014, she launched her jewelry and bedding collections for Gi by Giselle Blondet through Walmart in Puerto Rico. The business become a success throughout the island and was projected to reach the United States before Fall 2014. She also decided to release a second book titled, "Tengo 50...Y que?!" (I'm 50...so what?!), which is a collection of anecdotes aiming to help women transition into the age of 50. The expected release of the book was also Fall 2014.

In January 2016, she joined Telemundo and was the host of Gran Hermano. The show was cancelled after one season.

In February 2017, she returned to Univision to become the host of Pequeños Gigantes USA.

During Nuestra Belleza Latina's 2018 season, Blondet returned, as presiding judge.

== See also ==
- List of television presenters - Puerto Rico
- List of Puerto Ricans
