= Mira quién baila (American TV series) season 8 =

Spanish TV dance competition season 8

Mira quién baila
- Season 8
- Winner: Kiara Liz
- No. of episodes: 7

Release
- Original network: Univision
- Original release: January 12 – February 23, 2020

Season chronology
- ← Previous; Season 7 Next → Season 9

The eighth season of Mira quién baila, also known as Mira quién baila All Stars premiered on Univision on January 12, 2020. The TV series is the American Spanish-language version of British version Strictly Come Dancing and American version Dancing with the Stars. Eight celebrities are paired with eight professional ballroom dancers. The winner will receive a grand prize donation to the charity of their choice. Javier Poza and Chiquinquirá Delgado returned as the show's hosts. Dayanara Torres and Casper Smart returned as judges. Bianca Marroquín returned as judge, after being absent for the previous two seasons; while Yuri did not return as judge. The winner, Kiara Liz, received $25,000 for her chosen charity.

== Celebrities ==
Nationality	Celebrity	Occupation / known for	Charity	Status
Mexico	El Bebeto	Singer	Teletón USA	Eliminated on January 19, 2020
Colombia	Fanny Lú	Singer and actress	St. Jude Children's Research Hospital	Eliminated on January 26, 2020
Dominican Republic	Brea Frank	Host and announcer	Homeboy Industries	Eliminated on February 2, 2020
Mexico	Adriel Favela	Singer	United We Dream	Eliminated on February 9, 2020
Venezuela	Kimberly Dos Ramos	Actress	National Breast Cancer Foundation	Eliminated on February 16, 2020
Spain	Adrián Lastra	Actor	Make-A-Wish Foundation	Third place on February 23, 2020
Mexico	Sofía Castro	Actress	National Multiple Sclerosis Society	Second place on February 23, 2020
Puerto Rico	Kiara Liz	Model and Miss Universe Puerto Rico 2018	El Trotamundos	Winner on February 23, 2020

== Ratings ==
Episode		Air date	Viewers (millions)
1	"Week 1"	January 12, 2020	1.90
2	"Week 2"	January 19, 2020	1.86
3	"Week 3"	January 26, 2020	1.45
4	"Week 4"	February 2, 2020	1.32
5	"Week 5"	February 9, 2020	1.36
6	"Semifinal"	February 16, 2020	1.50
7	"Final"	February 23, 2020	1.90
