= Mira quién baila (American TV series) season 6 =

Mira quién baila
- Season 6
- Winner: Greeicy Rendón
- No. of episodes: 8

Release
- Original network: Univision; Las Estrellas
- Original release: July 29 – September 16, 2018

Season chronology
- ← Previous; Season 5 Next → Season 7

Season six of Mira quién baila premiered on Univision and Las Estrellas on July 29, 2018 and concluded on September 16, 2018. It is the first season to air in Mexico. The TV series is the Spanish version of British version Strictly Come Dancing and American version Dancing with the Stars. Ten celebrities are paired with ten professional ballroom dancers. Javier Poza and Chiquinquirá Delgado return as the show's hosts, while Joaquín Cortés, Lola Cortés, and season 5 winner Dayanara Torres joined as judges. The winner, Greeicy Rendón, received $25,000 for her charity and sponsored 9 houses, intended for families affected by the 2017 Central Mexico earthquake.

== Celebrities ==
Nationality	Celebrity	Occupation / Known for	Charity	Status
Peru	Verónica Montes	Actress	Hispanic Federation	Eliminated on August 5, 2018
Colombia	Mike Bahía	Musician	Hispanic Heritage Foundation	Eliminated on August 12, 2018
Russia	Irina Baeva	Actress	LatinosAgainstAlzheimer’s	Withdrew on August 19, 2018
United States	Rosie Rivera	Sister of Jenni Rivera	Casa de Esperanza	Eliminated on August 26, 2018
Mexico	Paul Stanley	TV Host	Make The Road New York	Eliminated on September 9, 2018
Mexico	Rommel Pacheco	Olympic Diver	Hispanic Association of Colleges and Universities	Eliminated on September 9, 2018
Argentina	Santiago Ramundo	Actor	FWD.us Education Fund	Fourth place on September 16, 2018
Venezuela	Emmanuel Palomares	Actor	Hispanic Scholarship Fund	Third place on September 16, 2018
Colombia	Sara Corrales	Actress	National Immigration Law Center	Second place on September 16, 2018
Colombia	Greeicy Rendón	Actress and Singer	Fundación Cultural Latin GRAMMY	Winner on September 16, 2018

== Ratings ==
Episode		Air date	U.S. viewers (millions)	Mexico viewers (millions)
1	"Week 1"	July 29, 2018	1.45	2.4
2	"Week 2"	August 5, 2018	1.21	2.2
3	"Week 3"	August 12, 2018	1.29	2.2
4	"Week 4"	August 19, 2018	1.41	2.2
5	"Week 5"	August 26, 2018	1.38	2.1
6	"Week 6"	September 2, 2018	1.10	2.2
7	"Semifinal"	September 9, 2018	1.47	1.9
8	"Final"	September 16, 2018	1.47	2.2
