= Velandia =

Velandia is a surname. Notable people with the surname include:

- Henri Velandia (born 1983), Venezuelan dancer
- Jorge Velandia (born 1975), Venezuelan baseball player
