= Hispanic Television Summit =

Annual TV industry conference

- Status: Active
- Genre: Conferences
- Frequency: Annually
- Venue: Varies
- Location: New York City
- Country: USA
- Years active: 20
- Inaugurated: September 30, 2003
- Founder: Joe Schramm
- Most recent: 2022
- Attendance: 400
- Organiser: Broadcasting & Cable, Multichannel News, Schramm Marketing Group (producer)
- Website: www.nyctvweek.com/fall/hispanic-tv-summit

The Hispanic Television Summit is an annual conference for those in the business of television and video for Hispanic viewers in the United States, and worldwide. The Hispanic Television Summit is presented by two business publications for the television industry, Broadcasting & Cable and Multichannel News, and is produced by Joe Schramm and Rafael Eli (deceased, 2020) of Schramm Marketing Group. It is held each Autumn in New York City. Topics focus on trends in the US Hispanic market related to brand advertising, consumer marketing, Media buying, video content creation, content acquisition and distribution, and the effects of those trends on the Hispanic television and video industry. The full-day event features multiple keynote and panel discussions, networking breaks, and the awards luncheon. The awards luncheon is the highlight of the event, where three or four executives, businesses or organizations are recognized for their achievements and leadership within the Hispanic television and video industry.

== Founding and history ==
The Hispanic Television Summit was first outlined in 2002 on the back of a paper napkin, during a meeting between current Summit producer Joe Schramm and Larry Dunn (then the associate editor of Broadcasting & Cable and Multichannel News). They had been directed by Larry Oliver (then the group publisher) to plan a conference to serve those in the business of TV for Hispanic audiences, following an increase in Hispanic television households, and an increase in annual consumer spending.

== Show highlights ==
=== 2023 ===
The 21st Annual Hispanic Television Summit was presented on Wednesday, September 13, 2023 at the etc. venues location at 360 Madison Avenue, New York City. The timing of the event coincided with Hispanic Heritage Month, which began on Friday, September 15.

The event was presented by Future plc’s Broadcasting + Cable and Multichannel News, as part of Fall TV Week, a series of conferences and special events for the television industry from September 11–14. The event was again programmed and produced by Schramm Marketing Group.

The summit opened with welcoming remarks from Future’s Kent Gibbons and opening comments from Summit Producer, Joe Schramm. Hispanic Marketing Council Chair, Isabella Sanchez kicked off the morning sessions with an address on the State of Hispanic Media & Marketing in 2023. She was followed by a panel focused on Trends in Global & Local Media, moderated by VAB’s CEO Sean Cunningham. The panel featuring media executives such as Gloria Constanza of D’exposito & Partners, Alex Minicucci and Michael Roca of Elevate and OMG, and David Tardio of Warner Brothers Discovery. The panel discussed the rapidly growing opportunities with ad-supported streamed content in Hispanic Television.

The morning sessions continued with a fireside chat, featuring T-Mobile’s Emma Velez Lopez. Emma shared perspectives and examples of creative advertising that reflect best practices for positioning a brand’s voice in the current Hispanic market, both locally and nationwide. This fireside chat was followed by a session featuring executives from Comcast and Gallegos United.

The morning concluded with a keynote discussion, featuring NBCUniversal Telemundo Enterprises’ Chairman Beau Ferrari. The conversation covered topics including the U.S. Hispanic demographic's potential as an economic growth catalyst, as an influencer of pop culture, and as a consumer force in today’s multicultural landscape. He also shared insights into Telemundo's streaming and FAST channel strategy, sports offerings, news coverage and programming in entertainment and reality.

The annual Hispanic Television Awards recognized individuals, program series, talent, and organizations for leadership in evolving the business of television intended for Hispanic audiences worldwide. The ceremony included a set of awards given in the name of the late Rafael Eli, a co-producer of the Summit who passed from Covid in 2020. The ceremony was hosted by ABC’s Joe Torres. The awards were presented in several categories. Two awards recognized “pioneers in Hispanic television” who continue to grow the industry by their continued efforts of 20+ years. The pioneer awards were presented to Horowitz Research, division of MARC Research, accepted by Adriana Waterston, Executive Vice President, and ESPN Deportes, accepted by Freddy Rolón, Head of Digital Content & Audience Expansion, ESPN. Three awards were presented in recognition of leadership in Hispanic Television. These awards were presented to Isabella Sanchez, Chair of Hispanic Marketing Council, Vice-president of Media Integration, Zubi Advertising Services, Miguel Gurwitz, Sports Anchor, Soccer Analyst, and NFL Commentator, Telemundo, and Tony Hernandez, Founder of the Immigrant Archive Project and Co-founder, President and CEO, Latino Broadcasting Company.

The ceremony was immediately followed by the awards luncheon. The luncheon was a celebration of the summit’s award recipients and included a selection of Latin-fusion foods, networking, and entertainment. Networking.

=== 2022 ===
The 20th Annual Hispanic Television Summit returned live and in person for the first time since the COVID-19 pandemic on Wednesday September 14, 2022 at etc. venues in New York City. The 20th Annual Hispanic Television summit explored the multiple ways that television programming embraced Hispanic culture in 2022 across platforms from streaming to broadcast to traditional pay TV, with a special focus on the increasing preference for programming made by Hispanics for Hispanics. The summit featured keynote conversations, panel discussions, presentations, and numerous networking opportunities, and honored six recipients with the distinguished Hispanic Television Award. Participants and attendees included executives and managers from brands and companies such as Telemundo, Estrella Media, Castalia Communications, Condista, ESPN Deportes, Comcast, and more.

The Summit opened with an address by Gonzalo Del Fa, President of Group M Multicultural on the state of Hispanic media, followed by an opening keynote conversation featuring Gio Benitez, transportation correspondent for ABC News. Morning sessions included a panel discussion about television media placement that included leading media buyers and sellers, featuring Canela Media's founder and CEO Isabel Rafferty, Canvas WW's, SVP, Client Director, Laura Willis, Horizon Media's SVP, Multicultural, Karina Dobarro, Omnicom's Managing Director DEI Investment, Michael Roca and Roku's Head of Ad Sales & Strategy, Katina Papas Wachter. The morning sessions also featured a detailed presentation by noted multicultural researcher Carlos Santiago of current data on “cultural visibility” in TV programming.

The annual Hispanic Television Awards recognized individuals, program series, talent, and organizations for leadership in evolving the business of television intended for Hispanic audiences worldwide. These awards were given in the name of the late Rafael Eli, a co-producer of the Summit who passed from Covid in 2020.The ceremony was hosted by Ana Jurka, Telemundo's Spanish language commentator for the 2022 FIFA World Cup in Qatar. The awards were presented in several categories. Three awards recognized “pioneers in Hispanic television” who continue to grow the industry by their continued efforts of 20+ years. Another award was presented in recognition of executive leadership while another recognized corporate leadership.

The final award was the Legacy Award for Outstanding Achievement in Hispanic Television. Sunny Hostin, the three-time Emmy winning co-host of ABC's The View, and best-selling author was honored with the Legacy Award for Outstanding Achievement in Hispanic Television. She was recognized for her contribution as a voice for Hispanic culture on television. Hostin joined other notables who have been recognized with this award including variety and talk show personalities Don Francisco, and Cristina Saralegui, Lili Estefan, and Raul De Molina.

The ceremony was followed by the awards luncheon. The luncheon was a celebration of the summit's award recipients and included a selection of Latin-fusion foods, entertainment, time to network and re-connect, all in a party-like atmosphere held within the Gallery of Honorees.

The Summit continued with notable afternoon sessions that highlighted Hispanic cultural visibility on television with a series of conversations about programming and its promotion, including a session, moderated by Sunny Hostin, that discusses the evolution of the iconic telecast of the annual Puerto Rican Day Parade, now aired on the English language broadcast station, WABC-TV. A fireside chat, featuring Comcast's Vice President of Multicultural Marketing, Jose Velez Silva, focused on how Comcast has been effectively tackling subscriber retention in its marketing efforts. Another discussion on audience promotion featured executive participants representing Canela Media's Chief Product & Technology Officer, Shampa Banerjee, HBOMax's Director of Multicultural Marketing, Jessica Vargas, Pluto TV's Head of Content & Partnership Marketing, Serge Gojkovich, Vevo's Sr. Director, Multicultural Sales Robert Velez and Tarima TV's Digital Media Executive, Freddy Arias.

The final sessions in the afternoon focused on delivering content to the Hispanic consumer. One session balanced between traditional cable TV distribution and streaming partnerships, with executive representatives from cable provider Comcast, streaming platform Vidgo and programmers Condista, and Castalia. The final session examined the dynamics of content partnerships on streaming platforms with executives from Google, Pantelion Films/Pantaya, Somos Next and Univision.

The Summit concluded with closing reception where attendees had a final opportunity to network and re-connect with old friends and associates.

=== 2021 ===
The 19th Annual Hispanic Television Summit was presented on Thursday, November 18, as part of Future's Fall TV Week, that took place November 15 through 19, 2021. As a health and safety precaution due to COVID-19, the summit was hosted virtually. The 19th Annual Hispanic Television Summit has been presented annually by Future's Broadcasting & Cable and Multichannel News. Likewise, the Summit has been consistently produced all nineteen years by Schramm Marketing Group.

The 19th Annual Hispanic Television summit examined the role of Hispanic television and the influence of Latino audiences on the television and video industries. Its programme covered Latino representation in sports, entertainment programming and election coverage, alongside cultural and economic trends.

The Summit's agenda included keynote interviews, presentations, and panel discussions with leading executives. The topics addressed media and advertising sales, brand marketing, Hispanic audience metrics and data, new programming (with a focus on election coverage and news), audience promotion, subscription marketing and content distribution.

The morning opened with remarks on the state of Hispanic TV from Gonzalo Del Fa, President, GroupM Multicultural. He outlined the direction of Hispanic TV as the leading creative and business influence on the future of television and video around the world. The morning continued with the opening keynote, which featured Isabella Sanchez, VP, Media Integration, Zubi Advertising, who shared her perspectives on the value of Hispanic TV media for brands in the U.S. as well as worldwide. She discussed how advertisers were enjoying an unprecedented opportunity for reaching Hispanic viewers across platforms in 2021–22, and was interviewed by Court Stroud, managing director, The Cledor Group. The morning wrapped up with a keynote interview that featured Katina Papas-Wachter, Head of Ad Sales and Strategy, The Roku Channel and interviewed by Tom Umstead, Senior Programming Editor, Multichannel News. Katina spoke about recent trends and data about Hispanic TV viewership of streamed content, and what viewer consumption told us about the US Hispanic household.

The afternoon kicked off with an informative panel on Media Buying and Advertising Sales where leading media buyers and sales executives discussed the rapid changes and new opportunities for brand messaging that advanced advertising and streamed content are providing to advertisers. These executives included Isabel Rafferty Zavala, President and CEO, Canela Media, Jason Hall, EVP, Sales, Estrella and Michael Roca, managing director, Multicultural, PHD Media. A research keynote presentation that discussed the latest insights (at the time) on Hispanic audience trends from leading network researcher, Judi Lopez, SVP, Content Distribution and Marketing, Fuse Media. The highlight of the afternoon session was the panel “Launching the One Year Countdown to Copa Mundial”, a three-part session that kicked off the one-year countdown to FIFA World Cup QATAR 2022. It started with an exclusive interview with the head of the QATAR Host Committee Enrique Perez, President, EP Media Group, followed by a brief conversation with Nasser Al-Khater, chief executive officer, FIFA World Cup Qatar 2022 that explained unique qualities of the 2022 event. The panel concluded with a panel discussion with leading executives Ray Warren, President, Telemundo Deportes and Eli Velasquez, EVP, Sports Content, NBCUniversal Telemundo Enterprises and Andres Cantor, Sportscaster about Telemundo's Spanish language, live coverage.

The summit concluded with the annual presentation of the prestigious Hispanic Television & Video Awards. The Awards continued to remain the highlight of the Summit, where leading executives, companies, organizations, and on-air celebrities were honored. In 2020, the awards were expanded to acknowledge individuals or organizations who have been pioneers of Hispanic Television and helped build and sustain the business. These additional awards were named for the late Rafael Eli, one of the two co-producers of this summit, who passed from the effects of COVID-19 in 2020.

The Rafael Eli Awards acknowledge the ongoing contribution of individuals or organizations who are pioneers in the industry and have been serving the Hispanic TV industry for 20 or more years. The Rafael Eli Award for Pioneer in Hispanic TV Media and Publicity was awarded to the Hispanic Marketing Council (HMC). Alma was honored with the Rafael Eli Award for Pioneer in Hispanic TV Creative Agency. The Rafael Eli Award for Pioneer in Hispanic TV Talent was presented to Mario Kreutzberger, a.k.a. Don Francisco, Presenter, CNN en Español.

The Hispanic Television Awards were presented to individuals, programs, or organizations in recognition of their achievements that drove the growth and prosperity of the overall Hispanic TV industry. The Hispanic Television Award for Corporate Leadership Platform or provider – cable company, satellite provider, or streaming platform was presented to Pluto TV and accepted by Tom Ryan, Co-Chairman and CEO, Pluto TV and President, Streaming, Viacom CBS. The Hispanic Television Legacy Award for Outstanding Achievement was presented to individuals, programs, or organizations in recognition of their career achievements that have raised the worldwide perception of, and respect for the business of Hispanic Television. This year the award was presented to both Ana de la Reguera, Actor and the TV series Tengo Talento, Mucho Talento. The award for the show was accepted by Peter, Markham, CEO, Estrella Media, Pepe Garza, Legendary Producer and Radio Programmer, EstrellaTV Don Cheto, Judge, Tengo Talento Mucho Talento, Host, Don Cheto Al Aire, Estrella Media and Ivan Stoilkovich, Executive Vice President of Television Content, Estrella Media.

=== 2020 ===
On April 16, 2020, Joe Schramm's business partner and co-producer of the summit, Rafael Eli, died from complications related to COVID-19. The Summit established the Rafael Eli Pioneer in Hispanic TV Awards, in recognition of individuals and companies that have continued to actively support Hispanic television for more than 20 years.

The eighteenth annual Hispanic TV Summit was held virtually, due to the restriction of in person events during the COVID-19 pandemic. The Summit was presented over the course of four days, beginning Monday, September 21, and concluding on Thursday, September 24.

=== 2019 ===
The seventeenth annual Summit was held on Wednesday, October 30, 2019, at the Westin New York Times Square, as part of NYC Television Week. The focus of discussion was "Changing Options" for the Hispanic Consumer.

The Summit opened with a keynote conversation between Fox News Channel journalist and political analyst Juan Williams and Summit producer Joe Schramm. Williams discussed his immigration from Panama into the United States, his career as a journalist, and his outlook on the growing influence of US Hispanics, stating "You no longer can see them as a secondary market". He also fielded questions regarding the 2020 US presidential election and stated that "candidates cannot take the Latino vote for granted" and "need to get out in the communities". Other speakers throughout the day included CEO of M8 John Santiago, CEO of the Video Advertising Bureau (VAB) Sean Cunningham, President of NBCUniversal Owned Television Stations Valari Staab, North American CEO of La Liga Boris Gartner, SVP of Insights for Telemundo Lia Silkworth, Oscar-winning producer Deirdre Fenton, CEO & Founder of H-Code Parker Morse, President of Castalia Communications Luis Torres-Bohl and CEO of THEMA Americas Patrick Rivet. Hosts for the day were Jessica Formoso of FOX 5, Christian Acosta of LatinX Now!, and Gio Benitez of ABC News.

At the awards luncheon, the Veinte Award for 20 Years of Achievement in Hispanic Television was presented to partners at Condista, Burke Berendes and Jorge Fiterre, to celebrate their 20 years in business; the Award for Executive Leadership in Hispanic Television and Video was presented to EVP, Revenue Strategy & Innovation at Telemundo, Peter E. Blacker; the Award for Corporate Leadership in Hispanic Television and Video was presented to AARP, and accepted by VP, Multicultural Leadership Yvette Peña; the Award for Outstanding Achievement in Hispanic Television and Video Programming was presented to Univision's República Deportiva, and accepted by co-host Félix Fernández, the executive producer Gonzalo Morozzi, and SVP of Sports Entertainment Federico Lariño.

=== 2018 ===
The sixteenth annual Summit was held on Thursday, October 4, 2018, at the New York Marriott Marquis, as part of NYC Television Week. The Summit was themed "New Directions".

Sandra Alfaro, the director of Wing, Grey, NY, opened the Summit with a keynote that focused on understanding and using culture to reach the current Latinx consumer. Other speakers throughout the day included: Laura Molen, EVP of Hispanic ad sales at NBCUniversal; Yvette Peña, VP of Latino Audience Strategy at AARP; Actress Claudia Lizaldi at INTI TV; Marc Bland, Chief Diversity Officer at IHS Markit; Romina Rosado, SVP of Digital at Telemundo Noticias; Friday Abernethy, SVP of Content Distribution at Univision; Jaime Davila of Campanario Entertainment, world-champion boxer Amanda Serrano, and more.

At the awards luncheon: the Award for Corporate Leadership in Hispanic Television & Video was presented to Telemundo Enterprises, and accepted by EVP & CMO Mónica Gil; the Award for Corporate Leadership in Hispanic Television and Video (Service Provider) was presented to Cox Communications, and accepted by executive director, Marketing/Hispanic Strategy Luis Caballero; the Award for Executive Leadership in Hispanic Television and Video (Programmer) was presented to Jessica Rodriguez, President, COO & CMO, Univision Networks; the Award for Executive Leadership in Hispanic Television and Video (Media) was presented to Lisa Torres, President of Publicis Media's Multicultural Practice, Cultural Quotient.

=== 2017 ===
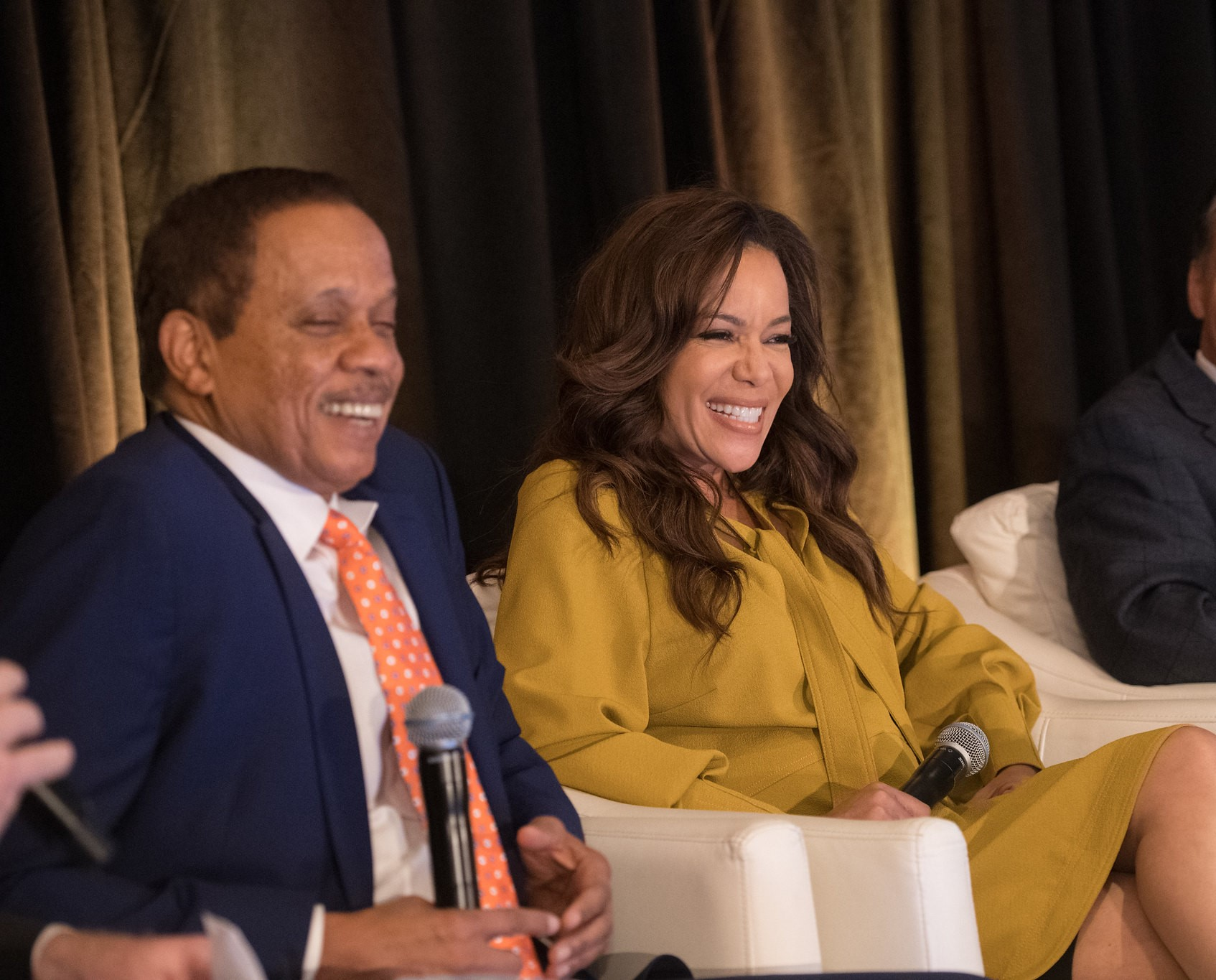
Juan Williams (left) & Sunny Hostin (right) discussing the impact of the world's political environment on Hispanic Television and its viewers.

The fifteenth annual Summit was held at the Sheraton New York Times Square Hotel, on Thursday, October 19, as part of 2017 NYC Television Week.

At the awards luncheon, the Award for Executive Leadership in Hispanic Television & Video was presented to GroupM Multicultural President Gonzalo Del Fa; the Award for Corporate Leadership in Hispanic Television and Video was presented to Altice USA; the Award for Outstanding Achievement in Hispanic Television was presented to Rafael Amaya, the star of the hit Telemundo series El Señor de los Cielos.

=== 2016 ===
The fourteenth annual Summit was held on Thursday, October 20, at the Grand Hyatt New York, as part of NYC Television Week. The focus of the event was how best to reach the cross-cultural and bilingual Hispanic viewer.

Scott Hagedorn, CEO of Omnicom's Hearts & Sciences, opened the Summit with a keynote conversation around the controversial "Total Market Strategy", designed to reach every Hispanic across all cultures. Other speakers throughout the day included representatives from Zubi, Casanova McCann, comScore, iSpot.tv, Comcast, Xfinity.

The Summit also focused on the reality television genre, with a discussion on Universo (TV network)'s The Riveras between Chiquis Rivera and María Celeste Arrarás, and a session featuring the cast of We TV's My life is a Telenovela.

At the awards luncheon, Cesar Conde, chairman of NBCUniversal Telemundo Enterprises, received the inaugural Executive Leadership in Hispanic Television & Video award. AT&T/DirecTV received the Corporate Leadership in Hispanic Television & Video award. The award for Outstanding Achievement in Hispanic Television was presented to Lili Estefan and Raúl De Molina, co-hosts of the long-running Univision program El Gordo y la Flaca.

=== 2015 ===
The thirteenth annual Summit was held on Thursday, October 22, at the Park Central Hotel New York. For the first time, the Summit was incorporated under the umbrella of NYC Television Week, a week-long series of TV industry events, presented for the third year by Broadcasting & Cable and Multichannel News.

President of GroupM Multicultural Gonzalo Del Fa, provided the opening keynote for the Summit. Gary R. Stevenson, President and managing director of MLS Business Ventures was another featured speaker.

At the annual awards luncheon, the Award for Outstanding Achievement in Hispanic Television was presented to television host, singer, and actress, Lucero. Verizon received the Award for Executive Leadership in Hispanic Television.

=== 2014 ===
The twelfth annual Summit was held at the New York Marriott Marquis on Thursday, October 2.

The Olympics and FIFA World Cup were key discussion points at the Summit, which included a panel on the subject featuring: Andrés Cantor, the Telemundo sportscaster and previous award recipient at the Summit, Gary Zenkel, the president of NBC Olympics, and Rubén Mendiola, president of mun2 (now NBC's Universo).

The awards luncheon presented Dish Network’s DishLATINO brand with the Leadership in Hispanic Television Award, and Don Garber of Major League Soccer with the Award for Executive Leadership in Hispanic Television.

=== 2013 ===
The eleventh annual Summit was held at the New York Marriott Marquis, on Wednesday, October 2. The theme of the Summit was "Exploring the Exploding Hispanic Television Business", and it attracted the Summit's largest attendance with over 525 people.

At the annual awards luncheon, the award for Achievement in Hispanic Television was presented to María Elena Salinas, the award-winning news co-anchor for Univision's Noticiero Univision (Maria's co-anchor Jorge Ramos received this award in 2008).

=== 2012 ===
The tenth annual Summit was held on Wednesday, October 3, again at the New York Marriott Marquis.

The Summit opened with a keynote interview from Cesar Conde, then the president of Univision Networks. Other featured executives throughout the day included General Secretary of CONCACAF Enrique Sanz, President of Soccer United Marketing Kathy Carter, EVP of Kia Motors Michael Sprague, Mark Boccardi of InDemand, Yousef Al Obaidly of BeIN Sports, and Jorge Hidalgo of Telemundo, and other executives from Walmart, Rentrak, Time Warner Cable, Viacom, Discovery, Mount Sinai, YouTube, and Video Rola.

The Award for Outstanding Achievement in Hispanic TV was presented to Telemundo news anchor José Díaz-Balart. Additionally, Comcast Cable was presented with the first Leadership in Hispanic Television Award.

=== 2011 ===
The ninth annual Summit was held at the New York Marriott Marquis on Tuesday, September 20.

Featured celebrities included Jencarlos Canela, of Telemundo's Más sabe el diablo, as well as well-known Spanish language broadcaster Maria Elena Salinas of Univision, who discussed the importance of the Latino vote in the coming 2012 presidential election. Featured executives included Time Warner's CMO Jeffrey Hirsch, MediaVest 42 Degree's EVP & managing director Steven Wolfe Pereira, Fox Deportes's general manager Vincent Cordero, Chairman of Cinelatino Jim McNamara, Kraft Foods' VP of Global Sustainability Christine Montenegro McGrath, and advertising director for State Farm, Ed Gold.

The award for Achievement in Hispanic Television was presented to Monica Gadsby, then CEO of Latin America and U.S. Multicultural for Starcom MediaVest Group.

=== 2010 ===
The eighth annual Summit was held for the first time in a one-day format on Sep 29, and drew the highest attendance thus far, with 400 attendees.

Featured speakers included executives from Levi Strauss, Procter & Gamble, Telemundo Networks and Cox Communications.

At the awards luncheon, World champion boxer and President of Golden Boy Promotions Oscar De La Hoya received the Lifetime Achievement Award in Hispanic Television.

=== 2009 ===
The seventh annual Summit took place during Advertising Week, on September 23 and 24, at the New York Marriott Marquis. The theme was "Generating Revenues For Hispanic TV....From Advertising, Subscription Fees and Transactions”

Don Francisco, the longtime host of Sábado Gigante, and first award recipient at the Hispanic TV Summit, opened the Summit with an overview of the growth of Hispanic advertising. Among the keynote presenters was then CEO of Telemundo, Don Browne.

The Award for a Lifetime of Achievement in Hispanic TV was presented to Edgar Sandoval, then general manager of North America for Procter & Gamble.

=== 2008 ===
On October 22–23, the sixth annual Summit was held at the New York Hilton Midtown.

At the awards luncheon, then CEO of Univision Communications Joe Uva provided opening remarks. The Lifetime Achievement award was presented to Jorge Ramos, Univision reporter and anchor of Noticiero Univision.

=== 2007 ===
The fifth annual Summit was held October 3–4 at the New York Marriott Marquis.

Among the featured keynotes was Isaac Mizrahi, then director of multicultural marketing for Sprint-Nextel, who presented data to show that Hispanics were over-indexing "not only in cell phone usage, but in the use of mobile data services".

At the awards luncheon, the Lifetime Achievement in Hispanic Television Award was presented to Cristina Saralegui, longtime Univision anchor and creator of El Show de Cristina.

=== 2006 ===
The fourth annual Summit returned to New York City, and was held at the Copacabana Times Square. There were about 250 in attendance. The Summit featured keynotes included Lynne Costantini, then Chief Business-affairs officer at Time Warner Cable and Arturo Villar, then publisher of Hispanic Market Weekly.

=== 2005 ===
In 2005, the Summit changed location to be held in Miami, from Oct. 18–19.

Featured executives included: Burke Berendes of Condista, Lino Garcia of ESPN Deportes, Howard Horowitz of Horowitz Associates, Raul Mateu (William Morris Agency), Roy Meyeringh of Venevision International, Jorge Ortega of The Jeffrey Group, Luis Silberwasser of Discovery Communications, Court Stroud of Azteca América, Maruchi Urquiaga of Castalia Communications, Leslie Villem of Comcast, Philip Woodie of Comcast Spotlight, and Antoniette Zel of Telemundo.

The Hispanic Television Outstanding Achievement Award was presented to Maria Celeste Arraras, Host and Managing Editor of the Telemundo's newsmagazine show, Al Rojo Vivo con Maria Celeste. She was the first woman to receive the award.

=== 2004 ===
The second annual Summit was held on the evening of Monday, December 6 and ran through midday of Wednesday, December 8. It was held at the Marriot Marquis Hotel in New York City.

The award for Outstanding Achievement in Hispanic Television was presented to well-known Telemundo sportscaster Andrés Cantor.

=== 2003 ===
The first Summit was held over two days on September 30 and October 1 at the New York Marriott Marquis.

Speakers included Eduardo Caballero of Caballero TV & Cable Sales Inc., Mauro Panzera of Comcast, Chiqui Cartagena of Columbia House, Tom Mohler of Olympusat, Enrique Perez of Telemundo New York, Jeff Valdez of Sí TV, Michael Schwimmer of EchoStar, Matthew Weiss of Cablevision, Tony Maldonado of Cox, Burke Berendes of Condista, Herb Scanell of MTV Networks, Starret Berry of LATV, Fil Fernandez of Hispanic Galaxy Inc., Lino Garcia of ESPN Deportes, David Sternberg of Fox Sports International, Kathy Carter of Soccer United Marketing, and Roger Hughet of GOL TV.

The first awards luncheon was held at this Summit. One award was presented: the award for Outstanding Achievement in Hispanic Television, which was presented to Don Francisco, Host of Sabado Gigante, the longest running weekly television show in the world.
