= Mira quién baila (American TV series) season 5 =

Mira quién baila
- Season 5
- Winner: Dayanara Torres
- No. of episodes: 10

Release
- Original network: Univision
- Original release: September 17 – November 19, 2017

Season chronology
- ← Previous; Mira Quien Baila 2013 Next → Mira Quien Baila 2018

Season five of Mira quién baila premiered on Univision on September 17, 2017, and ended on November 19, 2017. The TV series is the Spanish version of British version Strictly Come Dancing and American version Dancing with the Stars. Ten celebrities are paired with ten professional ballroom dancers. The winner received $50,000 for their charity. Javier Poza and Chiquinquirá Delgado return as the show's hosts.

== Celebrities ==
Nationality	Celebrity	Occupation / Known for	Charity	Status
Mexico	Marlene Favela	Actress	Cystic Fibrosis Foundation	Eliminated 1st on October 8, 2017
Peru	Franco Noriega	Chef/Restaurateur & Model	Unidos Por La Música	Eliminated 2nd on October 15, 2017
Mexico	Pablo Montero	Ranchera Singer & Actor	The National Center on Addiction and Substance Abuse	Eliminated 3rd on October 22, 2017
Mexico	Victoria 'La Mala'	Regional Mexican Singer	Casa de Esperanza	Eliminated 4th on October 29, 2017
Dominican Republic	ChikyBomBom	YouTube Personality	St. Jude Children's Research Hospital	Eliminated 5th on November 5, 2017
Venezuela	Alejandro Nones	Actor	Aid for Kids	Eliminated 6th on November 12, 2017
Puerto Rico	Ektor Rivera	Singer & Actor	Fundación Cabecitas Rapadas	Eliminated 7th on November 12, 2017
Cuba	Danell Leyva	Olympic Gymnast	American Society for the Prevention of Cruelty to Animals	Third place on November 19, 2017
Mexico	Ana Patricia Gámez	Nuestra Belleza Latina 2010 and Despierta América Host	Teletón USA	Second place on November 19, 2017
Puerto Rico	Dayanara Torres	Miss Universe 1993	San Jorge Children's Foundation	Winner on November 19, 2017

== Scores ==
Contestant	Place	4	5	6	7	8	9	Finale
Dayanara Torres	1st	1st	4th	6th	3rd	1st	5th	Winner
Ana Patricia Gámez	2nd	3rd	5th	3rd	4th	3rd	5th	2nd Place
Danell Leyva	3rd	5th	1st	1st	1st	2nd	5th	3rd Place
Ektor Rivera	4th	2nd	2nd	2nd	2nd	4th	E	
Alejandro Nones	5th	4th	6th	7th	5th	5th	E	
ChikyBomBom	6th	9th	7th	5th	6th	E		
Victoria 'La Mala'	7th	7th	3rd	4th	E			
Pablo Montero	8th	6th	8th	E				
Franco Noriega	9th	8th	E					
Marlene Favela	10th	E						

Red numbers indicate the lowest score for each week.
Green numbers indicate the highest score for each week.
indicates the couple eliminated that week.
indicates the couple withdrew from the competition.
indicates the couple that was safe but withdrew from the competition.
indicates the winning couple.
indicates the runner-up couple.
indicates the third-place couple.

== Ratings ==
Episode		Air date	Viewers (millions)
1	"Week 1"	September 17, 2017	1.90
2	"Week 2"	September 24, 2017	1.78
3	"Week 3"	October 1, 2017	1.66
4	"Week 4"	October 8, 2017	1.70
5	"Week 5"	October 15, 2017	1.90
6	"Week 6"	October 22, 2017	1.80
7	"Week 7"	October 29, 2017	1.70
8	"Week 8"	November 5, 2017	1.92
9	"Semifinal"	November 12, 2017	2.06
10	"Final"	November 19, 2017	2.35
