= Martica =

Martica can refer to:

- Monte Martica, mountain of Lombardy, Italy
- Martica la del Cafe (c. 1941 – 2026), Cuban-American television personality
- Martica Sawin, American author
