= Estefan (surname) =

Estefan is a surname. Notable people with the surname include:

- Gloria Estefan (born 1957), Cuban American singer
- Emilio Estefan (born 1953), Cuban-American musician and producer, husband of Gloria
- Lili Estefan (born 1967), Cuban-American model and show host, niece of Emilio and Gloria
