= Domestic violence in Paraguay =

The most pervasive violations of women's rights in Paraguay involve sexual and domestic abuse. On average one woman is murdered every 10 days. Although Paraguay has taken several measures to deal with this problem, including creating special police units for domestic violence victims, lack of adequate laws, as well as conservative attitudes within a male dominated society hinder progress.

== Social background ==
Paraguay highlighted on the map

Paraguay is a landlocked country in South America, bordered by Argentina to the south and southwest, Brazil to the east and northeast, and Bolivia to the northwest. The vast majority of its population identifies as Roman Catholic, and religion in Paraguay plays a very important role. Paraguay is a socially conservative society; and has been slow to change traditional views on family: divorce was legalized only in 1991.

== Extent of domestic violence ==
It is very difficult to assess the extent of domestic violence. Most cases are not reported to authorities, and victims endure the violence privately. In a 2008 survey, 20.4% of the women interviewed in the survey (aged 15–49) said they suffered physical or sexual violence by a current or former partner. This was lower than many other countries in the area, but these figures, being self-reported, may reflect differing personal understanding of what constitutes abuse. Of women who said they experienced domestic abuse in the past 12 months, 12.9% said they sought any institutional help for the abuse.

In 2017, 770 instances of domestic violence against men by their partners were recorded (1,540 annualised).

Domestic violent also exists in the LGBTQ+ community. Drag artist Usha Didi Gunatita turned her home into a refuge LGBTQ+ survivors of domestic violence.

== Legislative response ==
The legal response of Paraguay to domestic violence has been very weak, even by Latin American standards. Although Paraguay enacted in 2000 Law No. 1,600 Against Domestic Violence (Ley No 1.600 contra la Violencia Doméstica), this law - while having a broad definition of domestic violence (including physical, psychological and sexual abuse "lesiones, maltratos físicos, psíquicos o sexuales") - is civil in nature, and as such does not provide for any sanctions against the perpetrators.

While the Criminal Code provides for a crime of domestic violence, this crime has a very narrow definition, as physical violence that is carried out habitually, and is punishable by a fine only. As of 2014, there have been increasing calls, from both inside and outside of the country, for the enactment of a comprehensive law against violence against women.

== See also ==
- Crime in Paraguay
- Women in Paraguay
