= Usha Didi Gunatita =

Paraguayan actress

Usha Didi Guanatita
- Born: 16 February 1971; Caaguazú, Paraguay
- Died: 14 May 2015 (aged 44); Asunción, Paraguay
- Occupations: Drag artist, actress, activist
- Years active: 1980s–2015

Usha Didi Gunatita (16 February 1971 – 13 May 2015) was a Paraguayan actress, drag queen and human rights activist, who was one of the first transgender people to appear on Paraguayan television and not be censored.

== Biography ==
Usha Didi was born in Caaguazú on 16 February 1971. At the age of 13, she was orphaned by her mother's death, and she moved with her sister to Asunción. There she began working as a cleaner in bars such as Stop, Trauma or Playboy, while at night she performed shows that were characterized by using popular Paraguayan music. Later she also performed evening shows in the pubs of La Barca, El Audacio, Spider, Punto G and Luna. She participated in fundraising activities for the Homosexual Community of Paraguay (CHOPA), where she worked as a master of ceremonies.

Around 1996, she was part of the group Trans Faces, along with artists Kupple, Quiels, Lumiers, Cesarito and Kinsinha. The group produced drag shows in different venues in Asunción. In these shows Usha Didi imitated famous people such as Eva Perón, Pimpinela and Tita Merello. She was also the opening act for Hugo Robles' show Gordas. In 2013, she was part of the cast of El despojo a play by the Panambí Association and directed by Omar Marecos; in it she performed an autobiographical monologue. She also performed on television, including in the comedy show Claricaturas, starring Clara Franco.

Usha Didi also undertook philanthropic work in her community, by providing shelter in her apartment to homeless LGBT people or those living in situations of domestic violence. Her home became known as called Casa Humaitá. She would also visit children with cancer in hospital dressed as Santa Claus during the Christmas holidays.

Usha Didi died of cardiac arrest in Asunción on 13 May 2015, at the age of 44. She was buried in the Villa Elisa cemetery.

== Legacy ==
Usha Didi was a pioneer of drag art during the later years of the dictatorship of Alfredo Stroessner. Many drag queens of later generations claim her as a reference, and base their characters on Usha's exaggerated characteristics in her performances. She is also remembered as one of the first trans people who was featured on Paraguayan television without being censored.

In 2015, the year she died, she was remembered during the LGBTI+ Pride Parade, which she used to lead. In 2021 she was again honored, along with activist Miguel Ángel Auad, known as Petunia, during the pride march by the Panambí and SOMOSGAY associations. In 2022 Agencia Presentes created a webcomic telling her life story.

Shoes belonging to Usha Didi are part of the collection of the Museo del Barro.
