= Mira quién baila (American TV series) season 4 =

Mira quién baila
- Season 4
- No. of episodes: 11

Release
- Original network: Univision
- Original release: September 15 – November 24, 2013

Season chronology
- ← Previous; Mira Quien Baila 2012 Next → Mira Quien Baila 2017

¡Mira Quien Baila! (also known as Mira Quien Baila 2013 and Mira Quien Baila 4) debuted on Univision on September 15, 2013, at 8pm/7c. The TV series is the Spanish version of British version Strictly Come Dancing and American version Dancing with the Stars. Ten celebrities are paired with ten professional ballroom dancers. The winner will receive $185,000 for their charity. Javier Posa and Chiquinquirá Delgado return as the show's hosts. Horacio Villalobos and Bianca Marroquin continue as the judges this season, with Ninel Conde replacing Lili Estefan.

== Celebrities ==
The names of ten celebrities were revealed on July 18, 2013, during the broadcast of 2013 Premios Juventud.

Nationality	Celebrity	Occupation / Known for	Charity	Status
Mexico	El Dasa	Regional Mexican Singer	Cesar Chávez Foundation	Withdrew (Day 14) on September 22, 2013
Mexico	Graciela Beltrán	Regional Mexican Singer & Actress	M.U.J.E.R. Inc.	Eliminated 1st (Day 28) on October 6, 2013
Puerto Rico	Yolandita Monge	Grammy Award Nominated Singer & Actress	Leukemia & Lymphoma Society of Puerto Rico	Withdrew (Day 35) on October 13, 2013
Ecuador	María Elisa Camargo	Actress, Former The X Factor Contestant	Adelante Foundation	Eliminated (Day 42) on October 20, 2013
Cuba	Malillany Marín	Actress	American Heart Association	Eliminated (Day 49) on October 27, 2013
Puerto Rico	Manny Manuel	Musician	National Alliance for Hispanic Health	Eliminated (Day 56) on November 4, 2013
Mexico	Mané de la Parra	Music Producer & Actor	Hispanic Heritage Foundation	Eliminated (Day 70) on November 17, 2013
Venezuela	Marjorie de Sousa	Model & Actress	Autism Speaks	Third place on November 24, 2013
Cuba	Pedro Moreno	Television Actor & Model	Parents Against Cancer	Second place on November 24, 2013
Puerto Rico	Johnny Lozada	TV Host, Actor & Former Member of Menudo	Habitat for Humanity	Winner on November 24, 2013

== Scores ==
Contestant	Place	2	3	4	5	6	7	8	9	Finale
Johnny Lozada	1st Place	2nd	7th	5th	1st	2nd	4th	1st	3rd	Winner
Pedro Moreno	2nd Place	5th	4th	3rd	2nd	5th	3rd	1st	1st	2nd Place
Marjorie De Sousa	3rd Place	7th	2nd	4th	3rd	4th	1st	1st	2nd	3rd Place
Mané de la Parra	4th Place	6th	3rd	1st	5th	3rd	2nd	1st	E	
Manny Manuel	5th Place	8th	6th	8th	6th	1st	E			
Malillany Marín	6th Place	1st	5th	7th	4th	E				
María Elisa Camargo	7th Place	3rd	1st	6th	E					
Yolandita Monge	8th Place	4th	8th	2nd						
Graciela Beltrán	9th Place	9th	E							
El Dasa	10th Place	E								

Red numbers indicate the lowest score for each week.
Green numbers indicate the highest score for each week.
indicates the couple eliminated that week.
indicates the couple withdrew from the competition.
indicates the couple that was safe but withdrew from the competition.
indicates the winning couple.
indicates the runner-up couple.
indicates the third-place couple.
