= Mira quién baila (American TV series) season 7 =

Mira quién baila
- Season 7
- Winner: Clarissa Molina
- No. of episodes: 6

Release
- Original network: Univision
- Original release: January 6 – February 10, 2019

Season chronology
- ← Previous; Season 6 Next → Season 8

The seventh season of Mira quién baila, also known as Mira quién baila All Stars, premiered on Univision on January 6, 2019 and ended on February 10, 2019. Javier Poza and Chiquinquirá Delgado returned as the show's hosts. Dayanara Torres returned as judge. Casper Smart and Yuri replaced Joaquín Cortés and Lola Cortés as judges. The season features two past contestants from season 4: Pedro Moreno and El Dasa. The winner, Clarissa Molina, received $25,000 for her chosen charity.

== Celebrities ==
Nationality	Celebrity	Occupation / known for	Charity	Status
United States	Denise Bidot	Plus-size model	Ricky Martin Foundation	Eliminated on January 13, 2019
Puerto Rico	Iván Calderón	Former professional boxer	Hospital del Niño	Eliminated on January 20, 2019
Mexico	Sherlyn	Actress	Teletón USA	Eliminated on January 27, 2019
Venezuela	Chyno Miranda	Singer	Alimenta Venezuela Foundation	Eliminated on February 3, 2019
Cuba	Pedro Moreno	Actor	Mother of Christ Catholic Church and School	Fourth place on February 10, 2019
Mexico	El Dasa	Singer	César Chávez Foundation	Third place on February 10, 2019
United States	Amara La Negra	Singer	Dominican Women’s Development Center	Second place on February 10, 2019
Dominican Republic	Clarissa Molina	Model / Nuestra Belleza Latina 2016	Monumento Viviente de Nueva York Foundation	Winner on February 10, 2019

== Ratings ==
Episode		Air date	Viewers (millions)
1	"Week 1"	January 6, 2019	1.87
2	"Week 2"	January 13, 2019	2.04
3	"Week 3"	January 20, 2019	1.76
4	"Week 4"	January 27, 2019	1.76
5	"Semifinal"	February 3, 2019	1.58
6	"Final"	February 10, 2019	2.07
