= Franco Noriega =

Peruvian entrepreneur based in New York (born 1989)

- Born: Franco Noriega Haltenhof; January 16, 1989 (age 37); Lima, Peru
- Genres: Pop, Latin Pop
- Occupations: model, cook, singer; songwriter
- Years active: 2018–present
- Website: franconoriega.com

Franco Noriega Haltenhof (born January 16, 1989) is a Peruvian entrepreneur based in New York City who has branched out into the restaurant business, modelling, television, and the music industry. He is also a retired professional swimmer.

Noriega started swimming competitively at a young age, eventually representing Peru at various international sporting events. After retiring from his swimming career, he moved to New York City in 2007 and started modelling. He has since also opened his own restaurant, BABY BRASA, which focusses on organic Peruvian cuisine and catering. Noriega has hosted several television programs on the Food Network, and has appeared as a culinary guest on various talk shows such as The Ellen DeGeneres Show, Live with Kelly and Ryan, and The Wendy Williams Show. In 2017, Noriega ventured into the music industry with his debut single "Me Aceleras." Noriega released his second single, "Tu Llamada", in 2019.

== Early life ==
Born and raised in Peru, Franco Noriega grew up swimming competitively, representing Peru in several world tournaments. He moved to New York City in 2007 to study singing and acting at the American Academy of Dramatic Arts. His modeling career launched after being discovered by the fashion photographer Mario Testino. Noriega has modeled for brands like Dolce & Gabbana, Calvin Klein, Roberto Cavalli, Louis Vuitton, and Hugo Boss. In 2012, he became the youngest Creative Director at Macy's for the millennial division.

== Business career ==
Noriega was raised in a family of entrepreneurs; his parents own several businesses, including restaurants in Latin America. In 2015 he attended the International Culinary Center in New York City. In 2016 he founded the Peruvian restaurant BABY BRASA, and subsequently opened the brand's flagship location in the West Village as well as a full-service catering division. He also co-owns a restaurant chain in Peru with his sister and launch of a Sushi Bar in Manhattan, in September 2022.

== TV and Music career ==
Franco Noriega has appeared as a culinary guest on various talk shows such as The Ellen DeGeneres Show, Live with Kelly and Ryan and The Wendy Williams Show.

In 2017, he was a contestant on the Latin version of Dancing with the Stars: Mira Quien Baila.

Later that year he launched his first single "Me Aceleras", which he performed in various shows, including Teletón 2018, a telethon benefiting underprivileged children. In 2019 he released his second single "Tu Llamada."
