= Premio Lo Nuestro 2018 =

Latin Music awards show

30th Lo Nuestro Awards
- Date: February 22, 2018
- Location: American Airlines Arena
- Country: United States
- Hosted by: Laura Pausini; Lili Estefan; Alejandra Espinoza

Television/radio coverage
- Network: Univision

The Premio Lo Nuestro 2018 was the thirtieth edition of "Lo Nuestro Awards", held on February 22, 2018 at the American Airlines Arena in Miami, Florida; and was broadcast live on Univision. The presenters were Laura Pausini, Lili Estefan and Alejandra Espinoza, being the first time that the presenters are all women.

The ceremony started with a review of the three decades of musical history

== Description ==
The 30th edition of "Premio Lo Nuestro" was a great tribute to the Latin rhythms of the last three decades. Its protagonists did not disappoint on stage and relived their unforgettable successes also presenting new ones as a clear confirmation of the lasting Hispanic contribution to the musical sphere.

== Performers ==
Below is the list of the live performances of the artists and the songs they performed:

Name(s)	Performed
Laura Pausini	"Oye mi canto" / "Nadie ha dicho"
Pepe Aguilar	"100% mexicano"
Romeo Santos, Ozuna	"Sobredosis"
Daddy Yankee	"Gasolina" / "Dura"
J Balvin, Anitta, Jeon	"Machika"
J Balvin, Anitta	"Downtown"
Víctor Manuelle, Leslie Grace, Il Volo	"Con Los Años Que Me Quedan"
Leslie Grace	"Abriendo puertas" / "Conga"
Víctor Manuelle	"Mi Tierra"
Ricardo Montaner, Evaluna, Mau y Ricky	"Baladas clásicas"
Olga Tañón, Natalia Jiménez	"¡Basta Ya!"
Olga Tañón, Victoria	"Muchacho malo"
Olga Tañón, Natti Natasha	"Es mentiroso"
Olga Tañón, Chyno Miranda	"Como en las vegas"
Piso 21	"Déjala que vuelva"
Pitbull	"Don't Stop the Party", "Echa pa'lla", "Muévelo bom bom loca"
Silvestre Dangond	"Ven, devórame otra vez", "Cásate conmigo"
Banda MS	"Homenaje a Joan Sebastián"
Maluma, Nego do Borel	"Corazón"
David Bisbal, Nego do Borel	"El Triste", "Ave Maria"
Victor Manuelle, Bad Bunny	"La Vida Es Un Carnaval"
Alejandro Fernández, Los Tigres del Norte	"Para Sacarte de Mi Vida (Version Norteña)"

== Special awards ==
=== Acknowledgments ===
- Olga Tañón (Artists with the most awards received: 30)
- Wisin & Yandel (Tribute to musical career)

=== Lo Nuestro Excellence Award ===
- Emilio and Gloria Estefan

=== Trajectory Artist ===
- Alejandro Fernández
