= Henri Velandia =

Venezuelan dancer (born 1983)

- Born: Henry Velandia; July 20, 1983 (age 43); Caracas, Venezuela
- Occupations: Dancer, Dance Instructor

Henri Velandia (sometimes styled as Henry Velandia) (born July 20, 1983) is a Venezuelan dancer. He is most notable for his performance on season 1 of the Univision television program Mira Quién Baila ('Look Who's Dancing'). He is the founder and lead instructor of HotSalsaHot, a salsa dance school located in Princeton, NJ.

== Mira Quién Baila ==
Mira Quién Baila (MQB) debuted on Sunday, September 12, 2010, at 8 p.m. EST and was viewed by an estimated 8.8 million people. On September 8, 2010, Chevrolet, Target and AT&T were announced as the lead corporate sponsors of the program. Henri performed with Jackie Guerrido, weather anchor and journalist, and placed second overall.

== Other dance activities ==
Velandia founded HotSalsaHot, a salsa school in the central New Jersey area in 2005.

Henri performed at the Miami Salsa Congress in Miami, FL, on August 6, 2010. HSH students performed there at the semi-professional level on August 7, 2010. On April 18, 2010, Henri and his sister Claudia received second place in the open division at the College Showdown Latin Dance Competition at Drexel University in Philadelphia. Henri also performs and trains in modern dance. Velandia performed at Dancers in the Square in Princeton, NJ, on July 16, 2010, in a piece choreographed by Marie Alonzo Snyder. The performance was reviewed by Princeton student Joshua J. Vandiver, who Velandia met in 2006 and married in Connecticut on 29 August 2010.

== Immigration battle ==
Velandia's application for a work visa later that year was denied and he was threatened with deportation despite being the spouse of a U.S. citizen because his marriage was not recognized at a federal level due to the Defense of Marriage Act (DOMA). This case was taken up by LGBT rights activists campaigning against DOMA and the non-recognition of state-sanctioned same-sex marriages for immigration purposes.

After a protracted battle in which Vandiver unsuccessfully attempted to obtain a green card for Velandia, Velandia's deportation was cancelled and he received formal notification of this on 29 June 2011.
