= Raúl De Molina =

Cuban television presenter (born 1959)

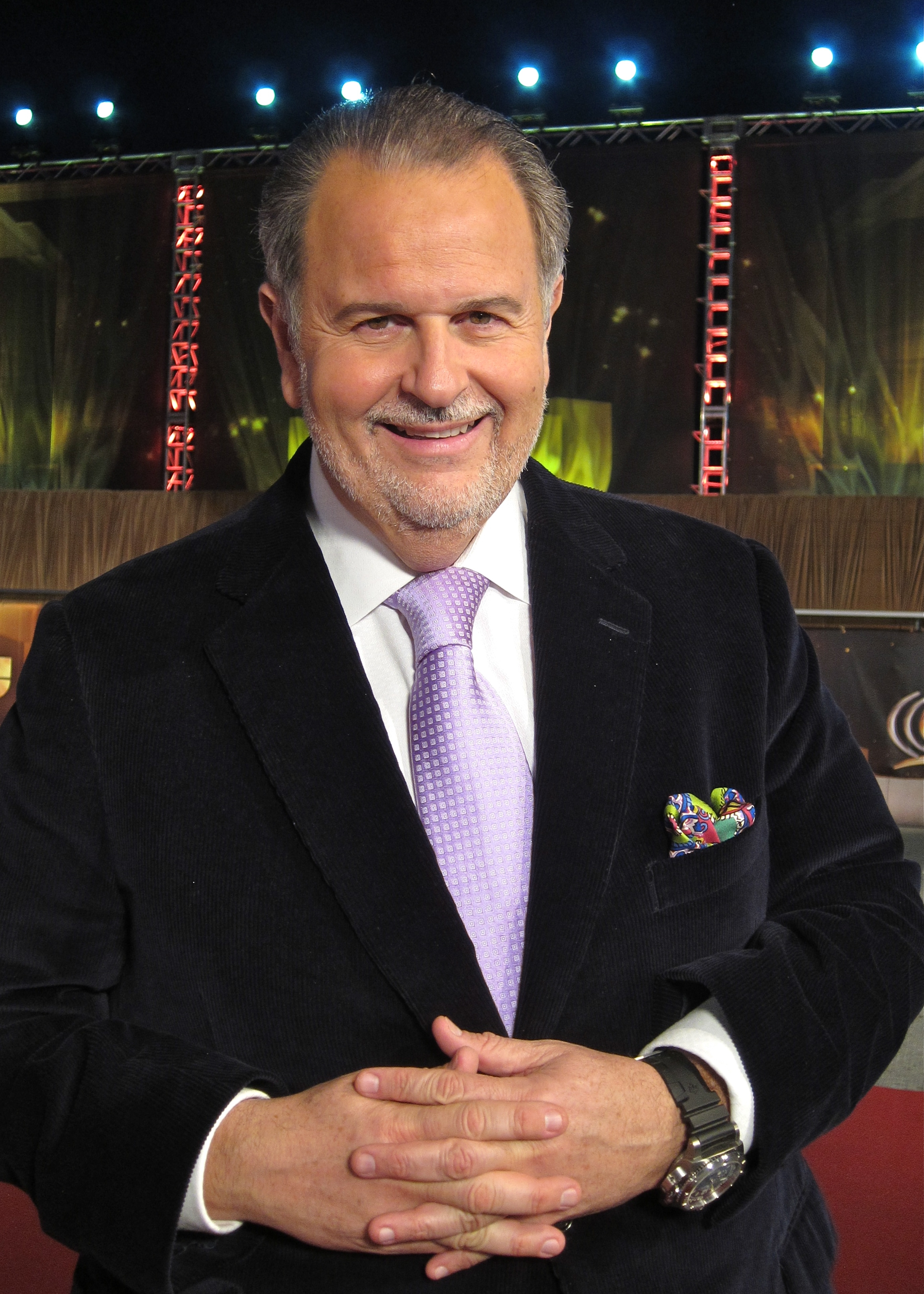
- De Molina at the 2010 Latin Grammys in Las Vegas
- Born: March 29, 1959 (age 67); Havana, Cuba
- Education: The Art Institute of Fort Lauderdale
- Occupations: Television presenter and photojournalist
- Television: El Gordo y La Flaca
- Spouse: Millie de Molina (m. 1994)
- Children: 1

Raúl "El Gordo" De Molina (born March 29, 1959) is a Cuban television presenter, best known as the co-host of the Univision Network entertainment news show El Gordo y la Flaca, for which he won multiple Emmy Awards.

== Early life and education ==
Raúl De Molina was born in Havana, Cuba in 1959 to Raul De Molina Sr. and Maria Gomez. De Molina's father was detained as a political prisoner for 24 years by the Communist Party of Cuba. De Molina's family left Havana and lived in Madrid, Spain when he was 10 years old. They moved to the United States when he was 16. His paternal grandfather was Spanish from Galicia. As a child, De Molina became interested in photography. While in high school, he took photos for the school yearbook. He later attended The Art Institute of Fort Lauderdale. He was also a graduate of Miami Photography College in North Miami.

== Career ==
=== Photojournalism ===
After graduating from the Art Institute of Fort Lauderdale, De Molina worked as a freelance photographer during the 1980s. He first freelanced for Associated Press, before freelancing for the Time, Newsweek, U.S. News & World Report and USA Today.

He documented news and live sports events, before eventually becoming a celebrity photographer. He was known for photographing celebrities and royalty including Elizabeth II, Diana, Princess of Wales, Oprah Winfrey, Robert De Niro and Melanie Griffith. In an interview with Entertainment Weekly, De Molina commented on the lengths he went to for his photographs, including dangling outside of a helicopter to photograph the wedding of Jane Fonda and Ted Turner.

His candid photos appeared in publications such as Life, ¡Hola!, and Paris Match. During the United States invasion of Panama, De Molina was one of the first photographers present and took photos of the inside of Manuel Noriega's house. In addition, he was a special contributor for the Spanish edition of Travel + Leisure magazine and has been featured in National Geographic Traveler, and The New York Times Travel section.

In 2005, De Molina's photography was displayed in the "Pictures of a Lifetime" exhibition at the Gary Nader Gallery in Miami.

=== Television ===
De Molina began appearing on various talk shows during the 1990s, including The Joan Rivers Show, Maury Povich Show, and Geraldo. These early television appearances brought him to the attention of Spanish-language channels Telemundo and Univision. He made appearances on shows like Sábado Gigante, and in 1998 became the co-host of El Gordo y la Flaca, alongside Lili Estefan. He has continued to host the show ever since, which has more viewers on its time slot than ABC, CBS, NBC and FOX combined.

He has hosted and reported for programs such as Primer Impacto, Ocurrió Así, Hola América, and Club Telemundo, as well as primetime specials and his own productions.

De Molina has also covered live events such as the Latin Grammy Awards in Las Vegas, and the New Year's Eve celebration in Times Square, Manhattan. While in South Africa to cover the 2010 FIFA World Cup, Molina was stranded during a safari when his car engine caught fire, and he was surrounded by lions. According to Molina, he was rescued after a passing family gave him a ride.

In 2008, De Molina was chosen as one of the "Most Influential Hispanics" in the United States by People en Español. He was featured in both the "Most Beautiful" and "Best Dressed" special issues of People en Español.

In October 2008, Random House published his second book La Dieta del Gordo about his own struggles with weight, and his secret to losing 70 pounds. De Molina was an inaugural contributor to the HuffPost's Food section. He continues to write regular columns on food, healthcare, sports and Hispanic culture. He is also a regular contributor to AOL News.

In 2008, De Molina appeared on After Hours with Daniel Boulud. He was a judge on Iron Chef America in 2011. He was also a guest on The Chew and The Wendy Williams Show.

He was also a judge in the Miss America 2012 pageant besides Kris Jenner, Mark Ballas, and Lara Spencer. In 2015, De Molina was a panelist on The Nightly Show with Larry Wilmore.

De Molina was prominently featured in the 2020 documentary film Mucho Mucho Amor: The Legend of Walter Mercado, about the life of Puerto Rican astrologer Walter Mercado.

== Personal life ==
De Molina married his wife Millie de Molina in 1994, and they have a daughter named Mia. He travels extensively and documents his journeys through photography, and frequently vacations with his family. He is a survivor of kidney cancer, and has spoken publicly about his efforts to lose weight and improve his health.

De Molina is an avid watch collector and his collection has been featured in The New York Times and Hodinkee. He has also cultivated a collection of art and photography, which includes works by Hunt Slonem, José Bedia Valdés, Li Hongbo, Liu Bolin, Valérie Belin, Lalla Essaydi, Manuel Mendive and Jean-François Rauzier.

De Molina serves on Art Basel's host committee, and his annual party is regarded as the unofficial "kick-off" event of the international exhibition show.

He has an interest in cars, which he developed as a young teen living in Spain where he often watched car races. His personal car collection includes a special edition 2013 Mini Cooper GP, Mercedes-Benz SLS AMG and a 2006 Ford GT40.

=== Philanthropy ===
De Molina has supported various philanthropic organizations, especially those related to children's health. He sponsors Voices for Children and the Miami Children's Health Foundation. He is an ambassador and sponsor for the Nicklaus Children's Hospital. De Molina photographed the hospital's patients and employees for its 2016 benefit calendar.

== Awards ==
De Molina has received several Emmy Awards, with his most recent nomination in 2016. In addition, he has won three Suncoast Regional Emmys.

In 2013, he was presented with the 20 Years Career Award during the 31st TVyNovelas Awards to commemorate his career. He was awarded the "Outstanding Achievement in Hispanic Television" at the 14th Annual Hispanic Television Summit in 2016.

De Molina and his cohost Lili Estefan were awarded their own stars on the Hollywood Walk of Fame in 2025. They were awarded their own stars on the Las Vegas Walk of Stars in 2009.

List of awards and nominations
Year	Award	Association	Result
2016	Outstanding Daytime Talent in Spanish	Daytime Emmy Awards	Nominated
2016	Outstanding Achievement in Hispanic Television	Hispanic Television Summit	Won
2015	Outstanding Daytime Talent in Spanish	Daytime Emmy Awards	Nominated
2015	Los Favoritos del Público to Best Male Host	Premios TVyNovelas	Won
2013	20 Years Career Award	Premios TVyNovelas	Won

== Filmography ==
=== Television ===
List of television programs
Year	Title	Credited as	Notes
1998–present	El Gordo y la Flaca	Co-host	
2018	Premio Lo Nuestro 2018	Self	TV special
2016	Viva Viviana	Self	
2015	The Nightly Show with Larry Wilmore	Guest panelist	
2013	The Chew	Guest	
2013	Arranque de Pasión	Self	
2012	Iron Chef America	Judge	
2011	The Wendy Williams Show	Guest	
2010	Concierto inaugural de la Copa Mundial	Host	TV special
2008	After Hours with Daniel Boulud	Self	
2006	Don Francisco Presenta: ¡Feliz 2007!	Self	TV special
2006	2006 Premios Juventud	Self	TV special
2005	Don Francisco Presenta: ¡Feliz 2006!	Self	TV special
2004-2005	Pa'lante con Cristina	Self	
2004	2004 Premios Juventud	Self	TV special
2004	Noche de estrellas: Premio lo Nuestro 2004	Self	TV special
2004	Premio lo Nuestro a la música latina 2004	Self	TV special
2003-2004	Primer Impacto: edición nocturna	Self	TV special
2003	Don Francisco Presenta: ¡Feliz 2004!	Self	TV special
2003	¡Suéltalo!	Host	
2003	República Deportiva	Self	
2003	¡Despierta América!	Self	
2002	Don Francisco Presenta: ¡Feliz 2003!	Self	TV special
2001	¡Pica y se extiende!	Host	
2001	¡Qué bodas!	Host	

=== Film ===
List of film appearances
Year	Title	Notes
2020	Mucho Mucho Amor: The Legend of Walter Mercado	Documentary feature
2006	National Lampoon's Pledge This!	Direct-to-video
2006	A Wonderful Christmas: Feliz Navidad	
2005	Selena: Noche de estrellas	Television documentary
2004	Un problema gordo	Television movie

== See also ==
- List of television presenters/Cuban American
