= Clara Franco =

Paraguayan actress, television host, comedian, impressionist and singer

Clara Franco (San José de los Arroyos, Paraguay; September 25, 1977) is a Paraguayan actress, television host, comedian, impressionist, and singer in television and theater. She was part of the first entertainment program of Telefuturo called Casino Hotel, where her character "La Yuyera" was born.

She appeared in almost all the programs on Telefuturo, was featured on other channels, and she performed many theatrical works, such as Divas Vs. Divus, Risaterapia seasons 1, 2 and 3.

== Career ==
Clara Franco began her career debuting on Argentine TV as part of a crew of comic actors directed by Leonardo Bechini in the series Cazados.

Franco had studied recital and theater since she was 3 years old. She formed a folkloric duo with her sister Montserrat. Currently, Franco is the vocalist of the Caiobá group. Beyond acting on Telefuturo, in the Telecomio program she was a comedian, along with actor Walter Evers and Gustavo Cabaña.

In 2015 she participated in singing competitions on the show Parodiando (Paraguay) where she parodied El Monchi Papá, Adele, Ana Gabriel, Paquita la del barrio and others. She also danced in Baila Conmigo Paraguay with her dance and theater partner Gustavo Cabaña, and won.

She appeared in other programs like Shoping del Humor, Claricaturas, Cantando por un Sueño, Matrimonios y algo mas, Tu dia de suerte, and Baila Conmigo Paraguay. Short films and national films are also in her repertoire. One of the performers on Claricaturas was drag artist Usha Didi Gunatita.

Television programs
Year	Show	Channel
2006	Matrimonios y algo más	Canal 13
2003–2005 and 2010–2011	Telecomio	Telefuturo
2015	Parodiando (Paraguay)	Telefuturo
2014	Pequeños gigantes (Paraguay)	Telefuturo
2017	Vive La Viva	Telefuturo
2017	Vive la Tarde	Telefuturo

Theater
Year	Work
2015	Habemus Locus
2011	Divas & Divos
2011	Risaterapia 2
2017	Falladas

=== Characters ===
- La Yuyera
- Ña Armi
- Ronchi
- Hugo Eusebio
