= Pequeños Gigantes USA =

- Genre: Talent show
- Presented by: Giselle Blondet (Host); Sebastián Villalobos
- Judges: Bianca Marroquín; Luis Coronel; Prince Royce
- Country of origin: United States
- Original language: Spanish
- No. of seasons: 1
- No. of episodes: 34

Production
- Executive producer: Marie Leguizamo
- Running time: 60 min. (including commercials)
- Production company: Univision

Original release
- Network: Univision
- Release: February 6 – April 6, 2017

Pequeños Gigantes USA (transl. Small Giants USA) is a Spanish-language reality talent show that originally premiered in United States on February 6, 2017, on Univision. The show is hosted by Giselle Blondet, with Sebastián Villalobos as digital reporter.

The talent show televises six teams of talented children from the United States and Puerto Rico (each group comprises three or four children and a celebrity captain) competing against each other to receive the highest ranking at the end of each week, and for the first place and the grand prize. Each group is divided into three categories: extraordinary talent, singing, and dancing. In each group there is one child who has an extraordinary talent, one singer, and one or two dancers.

Three judges give each child category a rating based from 1 to 5. The judges consist of Mexican theater-actress Bianca Marroquín, regional Mexican singer Luis Coronel, and American singer Prince Royce.

== Seasons ==
=== Season 1 (2017) ===
Auditions for the first season of Pequeños Gigantes USA were held from October to December 2016. It premiered on February 6, 2017 and ended on April 6, 2017. It had 34 episodes. In the season finale the team of Peque Flow won the grand prize of $100,000 USD.

==== Teams ====
Team name	Captain	Extraordinary Talent	Singer	Dancer/s	Position
Peque Flow	Johnny Lozada	Almany	Joel	Jean Paul and Ashley	1st
Mega Minis	Daniela Luján	Giuliana	Hadasha	Edrai and Alondra	2nd
Los MVPGS	Karol G	Angel	Angelito	Marilyn and Jerick	3rd
Pequeños Guerreros	Rogelio Martinez	Nathaly	Osvaldo	Leah	4th
Super Peques	Paulina Goto	Lunarena	Sharon	Vanessa	5th
Los Rebels	Jonatan Sánchez	Alana	Allison	Sebastián and Alejandro	6th

== Judges ==
Name	Occupation	Ref.
Prince Royce	Singer	
Bianca Marroquín	Theater-actress	
Luis Coronel	Singer	

== Ratings ==
Season	Timeslot (ET)	Episodes	First aired		Last aired	
Season	Timeslot (ET)	Episodes	Date	Viewers (millions)	Date	Viewers (millions)
1	Mon–Thur 8pm/7c	34	February 6, 2017	2.41	April 6, 2017	1.98

== Awards and nominations ==
Year	Award	Category	Nominated	Result
2017	TVyNovelas Awards	Best Reality	Pequeños Gigantes USA	Nominated
2017	TVyNovelas Awards	Best Host Revelation	Sebastián Villalobos	Nominated
