= Marta Martin Carrera-Ruiz =

Cuban-American television personality (c.1941–2021)

- Born: c. 1941
- Died: 27 February 2021 (aged 80)
- Occupation: television personality

Marta Martin Carrera-Ruiz (c. 1941 – 27 February 2021), also known as Martica "La del Café", was a Cuban-American television personality. She was known for among others, El Gordo y la Flaca.

== Biography ==
Martin Carrera-Ruiz worked selling coffee to Univision personnel. When El Gordo y la Flaca began during 1998, she was invited to prepare coffee to the show hosts and did so on live TV. For the next many years, she would be invited frequently to join the show on camera and comment during interviews to famous guests and also about entertainment news of the day.

Carrera-Ruiz died from COVID-19 on 27 February 2021, at age 80, during the COVID-19 pandemic in Cuba.
