= Mira quién baila (American TV series) =

American Spanish-language reality show

- Created by: Endemol Latino
- Presented by: Javier Poza (2010–2020); Chiquinquirá Delgado; Borja Voces (2021); Mané de la Parra (2022)
- Judges: Horacio Villalobos; Bianca Marroquín; Lili Estefan; Ninel Conde; Alejandra Guzmán; Roselyn Sánchez; Johnny Lozada; Javier "Poty" Castillo; Lola Cortés; Joaquín Cortés; Dayanara Torres; Casper Smart; Yuri; Patricia Manterola; Isaac Hernández; Roselyn Sánchez
- Country of origin: United States
- No. of seasons: 11
- No. of episodes: 95

Production
- Running time: 90–95 minutes

Original release
- Network: Univision; Las Estrellas
- Release: September 12, 2010 – November 19, 2023

¡Mira quién baila! (Spanish pronunciation: [ˈmiɾa kjem ˈbajla]; Look Who's Dancing), also known as MQB, is an American Spanish-language reality show that premiered on September 12, 2010, on Univision. The TV series is the Hispanic American version of the British show Strictly Come Dancing and its American adaptation Dancing with the Stars. The show involves celebrities (including singers, actors and others) being paired up with professional dancers. Each couple performs ballroom or Latin dances and competes for judges' critiques and audience votes. Whichever couple receives the lowest total amount of judges' critique and fewest audience votes is eliminated until a champion is named at the end. Each celebrity competes for a grand total of $50,000 for a charity of their choice.

The series has been renewed for an eleventh season that premiered on October 1, 2023.

== Cast ==
=== Cast timeline ===
Color key:

Host	Judge	Guest Judge	Contestant	Choreographer	Backstage Reporter / Digital Host	Mentor

Cast member	Seasons										
Cast member	1	2	3	4	5	6	7	8	9	10	11
Javier Poza											
Chiquinquirá Delgado											
Borja Voces											
Mané de la Parra											
Horacio Villalobos											
Bianca Marroquín											
Lili Estefan											
Alejandra Guzman											
Ninel Conde											
Johnny Lozada											
Dayanara Torres											
Joaquín Cortés											
Lola Cortés											
Casper Smart											
Yuri											
Patricia Manterola											
Paulina Rubio											
Isaac Hernández											
Roselyn Sánchez											
Javier "Poty" Castillo											
Anibal Marrero											
Rodrigo Basurto											
Jomari Goyso											
Pedro Prieto											
Migbelis Castellanos											
Amara La Negra											
Kiara Liz											
Sherlyn											
Toni Costa											

== Series overview ==
Series overview
Season	Contestants	Episodes	Originally released		Winner	Runner-up	Third place
Season	Contestants	Episodes	First released	Last released	Winner	Runner-up	Third place
1	10	11	September 12, 2010	November 21, 2010	Vadhir Derbez; Mexico	Jackie Guerrido; Puerto Rico	Rogelio Martínez; Mexico
2	10	11	September 11, 2011	November 20, 2011	Adamari López; Puerto Rico	Priscila Angel; Mexico	Erik Estrada; United States
3	10	11	September 9, 2012	November 18, 2012	Henry Santos; Dominican Republic	Fernando Arau; Mexico	Alicia Machado; Venezuela
4	10	11	September 15, 2013	November 24, 2013	Johnny Lozada; Puerto Rico	Pedro Moreno; Cuba	Marjorie De Sousa; Venezuela
5	10	10	September 17, 2017	November 19, 2017	Dayanara Torres; Puerto Rico	Ana Patricia Gonzalez; Mexico	Danell Leyva; Cuba
6	10	8	July 29, 2018	September 16, 2018	Greeicy Rendón; Colombia	Sara Corrales; Colombia	Emmanuel Palomares; Venezuela
7	8	6	January 6, 2019	February 10, 2019	Clarissa Molina; Dominican Republic	Amara La Negra; United States	El Dasa; Mexico
8	8	7	January 12, 2020	February 23, 2020	Kiara Liz; Puerto Rico	Sofía Castro; Mexico	Adrián Lastra; Spain
9	8	6	March 14, 2021	April 18, 2021	Jesus Díaz "Chef Yisus"; Venezuela	Aleyda Ortiz; Puerto Rico	Roberto Hernandez; Cuba
10	8	6	October 9, 2022	November 20, 2022	María León; Mexico	Ana Isabelle; Puerto Rico	Jorge Anzaldo; Mexico
11	8	8	October 1, 2023	November 19, 2023	Adrián Lastra; Spain	Lis Vega; Cuba	Lambda García; Mexico

== Ratings ==
Viewership and ratings per season of Mira quién baila
Season	Timeslot (ET)	Episodes	First aired		Last aired		Avg. viewers (millions)
Season	Timeslot (ET)	Episodes	Date	Viewers (millions)	Date	Viewers (millions)	Avg. viewers (millions)
1	Sunday 8:00 pm	11	September 12, 2010	4.0	November 21, 2010	5.1	TBD
2	Sunday 8:00 pm	11	September 11, 2011	4.1	November 20, 2011	5.0	TBD
3	Sunday 8:00 pm	11	September 9, 2012	3.6	November 18, 2012	3.9	TBD
4	Sunday 8:00 pm	11	September 15, 2013	3.6	November 24, 2013	4.4	TBD
5	Sunday 8:00 pm	10	September 17, 2017	1.9	November 19, 2017	2.3	1.88
6	Sunday 8:00 pm	8	July 29, 2018	1.4	September 16, 2018	1.4	1.35
7	Sunday 8:00 pm	6	January 6, 2019	1.8	February 10, 2019	2.0	1.85
8	Sunday 8:00 pm	7	January 12, 2020	1.9	February 23, 2020	1.9	1.62
9	Sunday 8:00 pm	6	March 14, 2021	1.8	April 18, 2021	1.7	1.55
10	Sunday 8:00 pm	6	October 9, 2022	1.3	November 20, 2022	1.3	1.32
11	Sunday 7:00 pm	8	October 1, 2023	0.84	November 19, 2023	1.04	0.93

=== Mexico ratings ===
Season	Timeslot (ET)	Season premiere		Season finale	
Season	Timeslot (ET)	Date	Viewers (millions)	Date	Viewers (millions)
6	Sunday 9pm	July 29, 2018	2.4	September 16, 2018	2.2

== Awards and nominations ==
Year	Award	Category	Nominated	Result
2019	TVyNovelas Awards	Best Reality	Mira quién baila	Nominated
