= El Gordo y la Flaca =

Television series

- Genre: News show
- Created by: Emilio Estefan
- Presented by: Lili Estefan; Raúl De Molina

Production
- Production locations: Miami, Florida
- Running time: 60 minutes (incl. commercials)

Original release
- Network: Univision
- Release: September 21, 1998 – present

El Gordo y la Flaca (literal translation: The Fat Man and the Skinny Woman) is an American Spanish-language entertainment pop culture news show.

== History ==
El Gordo y La Flaca first aired on September 21, 1998, on Univision, hosted by Raúl De Molina ("El Gordo") and Cuban model Lili Estefan ("La Flaca"), the niece of music mogul and producer Emilio Estefan, the husband of singer/songwriter Gloria Estefan.

The show combines interviews with actors, musicians, and other celebrities with reports on their comings and goings. The show appears weekdays on the Spanish-language television network Univision. It is filmed in the network's studios in Miami, Florida.

For many years, the show also featured an in-house coffee maker who appeared several times on Live TV, Marta Martin Carrera-Ruiz, known to show viewers as "Martica la del Cafe", but had left the show & Univision in 2018, and later died in 2021.

In 2025, De Molina and Estefan were awarded their own stars on the Hollywood Walk of Fame. The stars were placed side by side and awarded in a double ceremony in recognition of their partnership as cohosts.

== Correspondents ==
The correspondents for the show are Gelena Solano from New York City, Oscar Petit, Clarissa Molina and Daniela Di Giacomo from Miami, Tanya Charry, Maria Hurtado and David Valadez from Los Angeles and Elizabeth Curiel from Mexico City.

== See also ==
- Raúl De Molina
- Lili Estefan
- Clarissa Molina
- Jeinny Lizarazo
- Mariela Cardona
