= Lili Estefan =

Cuban-born American model and TV host (born 1967)

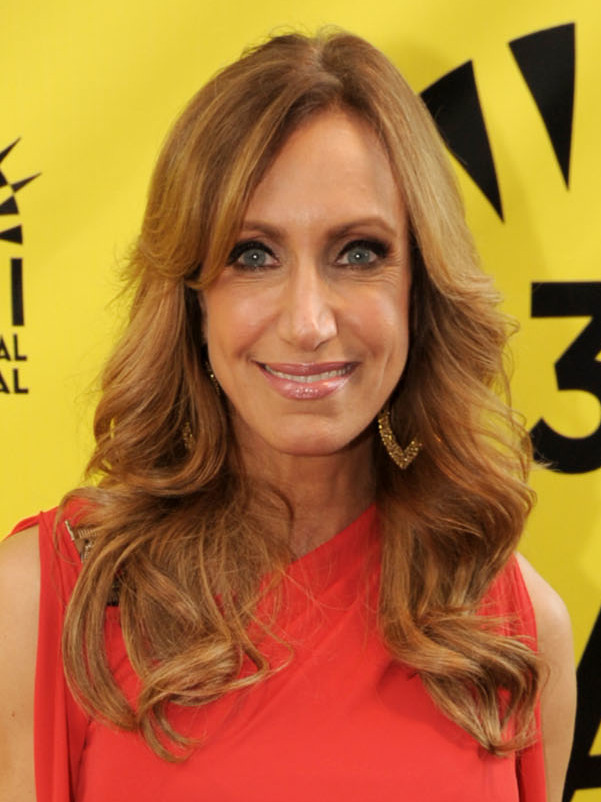
- Estefan at the 2014 Miami International Film Festival
- Born: Liliana Del Carmen Estefan García; March 20, 1967 (age 59); Santiago de Cuba, Cuba
- Occupations: Show host; model
- Known for: El Gordo y La Flaca; Red Table Talk: The Estefans
- Spouse: Lorenzo Luaces (m. 1992; div. 2018)
- Children: 2
- Relatives: Emilio Estefan (uncle); Gloria Estefan (aunt); Emily Estefan (cousin)

Liliana Del Carmen Estefan García (born March 20, 1967) is a Cuban-American model and television presenter, known as the co-host of El Gordo y la Flaca on Univision.

== Biography ==
Lili Estefan was born on March 20, 1967, in Santiago de Cuba. Lili's father is José Estefan (b. 1945). Upon losing her mother at the age of ten, Lili emigrated to the United States with her widower father and younger brother Juan Emilio (b. 1967). She is the paternal niece of music producer Emilio Estefan, whose wife is singer Gloria Estefan.

== Career ==
=== Miss Calle Ocho and Modeling Begings ===
In 1983, at the age of 16, she made her debut as a model, participating in the Miss Calle Ocho 1983 Pageant (now known as Miss Carnaval Miami Pageant), won by Janette Arteaga. Although she didn't win, this opened her the door to the modeling world in Miami. Later Lili also appeared in several music videos by her uncle Emilio Estefan and his wife Gloria Estefan's band Miami Sound Machine such as Conga and Rhythm Is Gonna Get You.

=== Sábado Gigante ===
Estefan first came to the spotlight in 1986, when she was hired by Univision to participate as a model on the television show Sábado Gigante. She quickly became a favorite of the audience and the show host, Don Francisco. Estefan appeared on Francisco's program Don Francisco Presenta on numerous occasions.

=== El Gordo y la Flaca ===
Estefan has co-hosted Univision's daytime talk show El Gordo y la Flaca with Raúl De Molina since 1998. Estefan earned her nickname "La Flaca" ("The Skinny Girl") from the show.

=== Mira Quien Baila ===
Estefan is one of the judges on Mira Quien Baila with a panel that includes Horacio Villalobos and Bianca Marroquín.

=== Red Table Talk: The Estefans ===
In 2020, Estefan became a co-host of Red Table Talk: The Estefans, a spin-off of the Facebook Watch talk show Red Table Talk alongside her aunt Gloria Estefan and paternal cousin Emily.

== Awards and honors ==
In 2015, Lili Estefan received the Lifetime Achievement Award at the 33rd Annual Premios TVyNovelas, presented by Televisa. In 2016, Estefan and her co-host of El Gordo y La Flaca, Raúl de Molina, were honored with the award for Outstanding Achievement in Hispanic Television, at the 14th Annual Hispanic Television Summit, presented by Broadcasting & Cable and Multichannel News, and produced by Schramm Marketing Group. In 2017, Estefan received the Career Award at the Premio Lo Nuestro Awards, presented by Univision. In 2018, she received a Daytime Talent in Spanish Emmy Award from The National Academy of Television Arts & Sciences. In 2025, she and De Molina were awarded stars on the Hollywood Walk of Fame.

== Personal life ==
Estefan married Cuban businessman Lorenzo Luaces in 1992. They have two children: Lorenzo Luaces Jr. (b. 1999) and Lina Teresa Luaces (b. 2002). In 2018 it was announced that the couple was divorcing. In 2025, her daughter Lina won the title Miss Cuba Universe 2025.

== See also ==
- List of television presenters § Cuba
