= Bianca Marroquín =

Mexican musical theatre and television actress

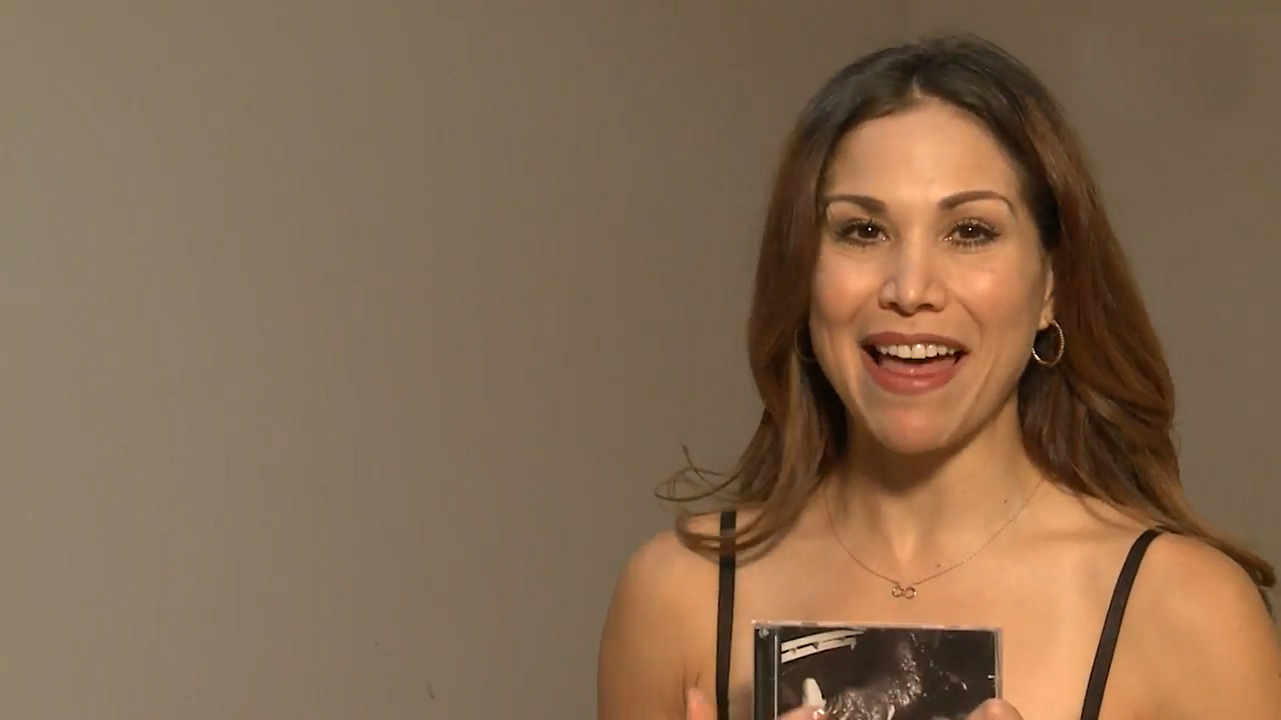
- Born: Bianca Pamela Marroquín Pérez; Monterrey, Nuevo León, Mexico
- Occupations: Singer; dancer; actress
- Website: biancamarroquin.com

Bianca Marroquín is a Mexican musical theatre and television actress known for being the first Mexican actress to have a starring role on Broadway. She has performed in the musical Chicago for over twenty years and is one of the few actresses to play both female leads, Roxie Hart and Velma Kelly.

== Early life and education ==
Bianca Marroquín was born in Monterrey, Nuevo Leon, She grew up living in Matamoros, Tamaulipas Mexico and spent her childhood crossing between Matamoros and Brownsville, Texas. She attended high school at St. Joseph Academy in Brownsville, Texas. She returned to Monterrey to attend a technical college, where she majored in communications.

== Career ==
While still in college, Bianca Marroquín auditioned and got a role in the Mexico City production of Beauty and the Beast, so she decided to move to Mexico City and start her professional theatre career. She performed in Mexican productions of several Broadway musicals: Rent (1999–2001), The Phantom of the Opera, and Chicago, which landed her an invitation to perform as Roxie Hart, with George Hamilton as Billy Flynn, at the Ambassador Theatre on Broadway. Afterward, she returned to Mexico City to close the Chicago season and join The Vagina Monologues Mexican cast.

She left The Vagina Monologues when she received the invitation to perform as Roxie Hart in the US and Canada tour of Chicago. This tour made her the first Mexican ever in receiving the Helen Hayes Award in Washington, D.C., as outstanding Lead Actress. In December 2003, she went back to Broadway as Roxie Hart, now at the Ambassador Theatre, to rejoin the tour after his Broadway season. Marroquin has played Roxie Hart in the Broadway production of Chicago three times since then, in 2006, 2007 and 2008. Her recent off-Broadway work has included And the World Goes 'Round in October 2007 and the North Shore Music Theatre production of Bye Bye Birdie in summer 2008.

In the Mexican production of The Sound of Music, she starred as Maria, alongside Lisardo and Olivia Bucio. After 100 performances she returned to work in the USA national tour of the Chicago company. She announced on her Twitter and Facebook page that she was joining the Broadway cast of In the Heights from June 12 to September 5, 2010 to play the role of Daniela.

Starting in 2010, Marroquín made a return to television as a judge for Mira Quien Baila (the Spanish language version of Dancing with the Stars) for four years running. She also appeared in Pequenos Gigantes in 2011. From there, Televisa picked her up as the main protagonist of the new telenovela Esperanza del Corazón. It premiered on July 18, 2011 in Mexico. She also sings the theme song to the novela, titled "Esperanza del Corazón".

She was Mary Poppins in the first production of the Disney musical in Spanish in November 14, 2012 in Mexico City.

Bianca Marroquín is a judge for the current season of "Bailando por un Sueño", a reality competition show seen on Univision. She returned once more to the starring role of Roxie Hart in the long-running Broadway hit Chicago on March 31, 2014. That same month, Marroquín was named the first-ever National Ambassador for Viva Broadway. The Broadway League of producers created the new audience development initiative to help bridge the world of Broadway with Latino audiences around the country.

Marroquín's first solo album, El Mundo Era Mío (The World Was Mine) was released May 13, 2014. She co-wrote five of the songs on the 11-track album, which is described as a mix of contemporary pop with a healthy splash of Latin influence, with songs in both English and Spanish. Three years later, she released a second album, Nuestros Tesoros, consisting of covers of classic songs in Spanish.

Marroquín played Chita Rivera in Fosse/Verdon, a TV show about the lives of Bob Fosse and Gwen Verdon, which was released in 2019.

After playing Roxie Hart for 20 years, Marroquín reopened Chicago on Broadway as the other female lead Velma Kelly after the COVID-19 pandemic shutdown. She performed as Velma Kelly during the musical's 25th anniversary celebration performance, which occurred at the Ambassador Theatre on November 16, 2021. During the evening performance of February 4, 2022, she was presented with the Mr. Amigo 2022 award by the Mr. Amigo Association.

== Awards and honors ==
- 2004: Helen Hayes Award for Outstanding Lead Actress
- Five Mexican Critics Association trophies, including Best Actress
- 2014 National Ambassador for Viva Broadway
- 2022: Mr. Amigo

== Television ==
Year	Title	Role	Notes	Ref.
2010–2013	Mira Quien Baila	Herself	Season 1–4; Judge	
2011–2012	Pequeños Gigantes	Herself	Season 1–2; Judge	
2011–12	Esperanza del corazón	Ángela Landa. / Ángela Landa de Dupris. / Ángela Landa de Duarte.	Main Role	
2017	Pequeños Gigantes USA	Herself	Judge	
2019	Fosse/Verdon	Chita Rivera	Miniseries	
