= Chiquinquirá Delgado =

Venezuelan TV host, model, and actress

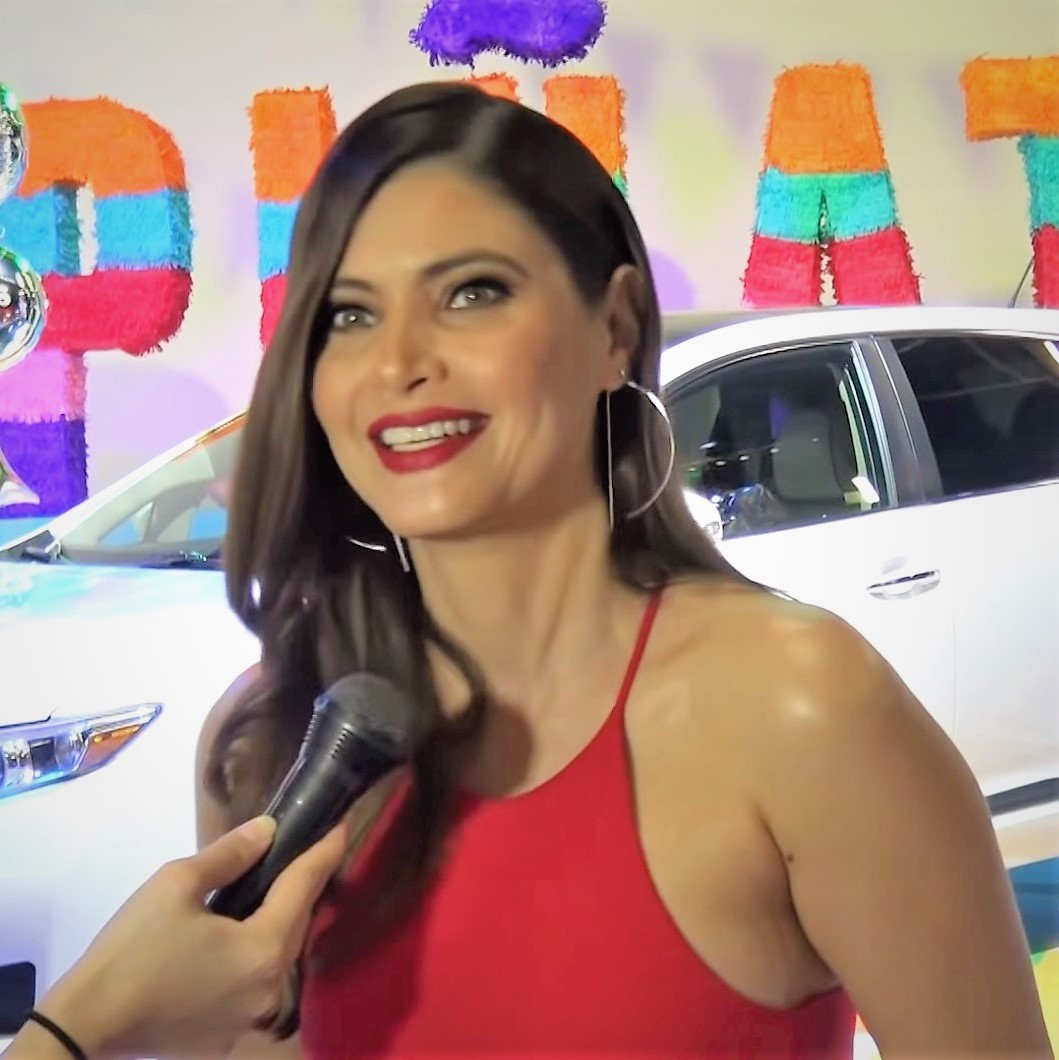
- Delgado interviewed by Dulce Osuna in 2017
- Born: María Chiquinquirá Delgado Díaz; August 17, 1972 (age 53); Maracaibo, Venezuela
- Occupations: TV host; model; actress
- Spouses: Guillermo Dávila (m. 1991–1999); Daniel Sarcos (m. 2003–2010); Jorge Ramos (m. 2011)
- Children: 2, including Marielena Davila
- Website: chiquidelgado.com

María Chiquinquirá Delgado Díaz (born August 17, 1972 in Maracaibo, Venezuela) is a Venezuelan actress, tv host, model and beauty pageant titleholder. She was a co-host of Mira Quien Baila on the Univision network in the United States. Prior to that, she was the host of ¡Despierta América!, the morning show on Univision, from 2010 until 2012.

== Biography ==
Named after the Virgen de Chiquinquirá, Delgado grew up in a devoutly Roman Catholic family in Maracaibo, Venezuela. Delgado was first runner-up at Miss Venezuela 1990 pageant and has appeared in several soap operas and hosted a number of programs on Venezuelan television. From 1991 until 1999, she was married to singer and actor Guillermo Dávila, with whom she has a daughter, actress María Elena Dávila. From 2004 until 2010, she was married to Venezuelan television host Daniel Sarcos, with whom she also has a daughter. Delgado has been dating Univision news anchor Jorge Ramos since 2011.

Delgado recently launched her own fashion apparel line in collaboration with David Lerner. It is available at ChiquiDelgado.com as well as at select boutiques and department stores.

== Filmography ==
=== TV shows host ===
- Nuestra Belleza Latina, 2014–2016
- Mira quién baila, 2010–2013; 2017
- Despierta America, 2011–2012,
- Miss Venezuela 2010
- Donde Nace El Amor, 2009
- Portada's, 2005–2009
- Mega Match 2002–2004

=== TV series ===
- Calypso, 1999
- María Rosa, búscame una esposa, 2000
- Mambo y canela, 2002
- Cosita Rica, 2003
- High Seas, 2019

=== Movies ===
- Pimp Bullies, Victimas de un Prostíbulo, 2011, director Alejandro Peña
- Cuento sin Hadas, 2011, director Sergio Briones
