= Dancing with the Stars (New Zealand TV series) series 7 =

Dancing with the Stars
- Season 7
- Celebrity winner: Sam Hayes
- Professional winner: Aaron Gilmore
- No. of episodes: 19

Release
- Original network: Three
- Original release: 29 April – 1 July 2018

Series chronology
- ← Previous; Season 6 Next → Season 8

The seventh series of Dancing with the Stars premiered on 29 April 2018 on Three, and was hosted by Dai Henwood and Sharyn Casey. Camilla Sacre-Dallerup, Julz Tocker, and Rachel White are the series' judges; Sacre-Dullerup serves as the head judge. Sam Hayes won the competition on 1 July 2018.

== Cast ==
=== Couples ===
Celebrity	Notability	Professional partner	Status
Gilda Kirkpatrick	The Real Housewives of Auckland star & author	Shae Mountain	Eliminated 1st on May 7, 2018
Naz Khanjani	The Bachelor New Zealand contestant	Tim Mullayanov; Shae Mountain (Week 3)	Eliminated 2nd on May 14, 2018
Zac Franich	The Bachelor New Zealand star	Kristie Williams	Eliminated 3rd on May 21, 2018
Marama Fox	Former Maori Party politician	Brad Coleman	Eliminated 4th on May 28, 2018
Robert Rakete	The Breeze radio presenter	Nicole Harrington	Eliminated 5th on June 4, 2018
Suzy Cato	Children's television & radio broadcaster	Matt Tatton-Brown	Eliminated 6th on June 11, 2018
Roger Farrelly	The Rock radio presenter	Carol-Ann Hickmore	Eliminated 7th on June 18, 2018
David Seymour	ACT Party politician	Amelia McGregor	Eliminated 8th on June 25, 2018
Shavaughn Ruakere	Actress & television presenter	Enrique Johns	Eliminated 9th on July 1, 2018
Jess Quinn	Model & social media personality	Jonny Williams	Third Place on July 1, 2018
Chris Harris	Former Black Cap cricketer	Vanessa Cole	Runners-up on July 1, 2018
Sam Hayes	Newshub broadcaster & journalist	Aaron Gilmore	Winners on July 1, 2018

== Scorecard ==
Team	Place	1	2	1+2	3	4	5	6	7	8	9	10	
Team	Place	1	2	1+2	3	4	5	6	7	8	9	Top 4	Top 3
Sam & Aaron	1	22	18	40	20	26	24	26	25	29+22=51	23+27=50	29	+29=58
Chris & Vanessa	2	18	24	42	24	20	23	27	25	27+22=49	29+28=57	30	+30=60
Jess & Jonny	3	23	23	46	21	24	24	26	22	24+24=48	25+29=54	28	+29=57
Shavaughn & Enrique	4	20	21	41	23	25	25	23	22	26+24=50	26+29=55	26	
David & Amelia	5	15	20	35	12	18	15	16	15	21+22=43	13+18=31		
Roger & Carol-Ann	6	18	16	34	20	18	19	20	19	18+24=42			
Suzy & Matt	7	21	21	42	21	21	22	25	23				
Robert & Nicole	8	17	21	38	18	21	21	22					
Marama & Brad	9	17	14	31	24	23	22						
Zac & Kristie	10	19	24	43	17	24							
Naz & Tim	11	19	24	43	20								
Gilda & Shae	12	18	17	35									

Red numbers indicate the couples with the lowest score for each week.
Green numbers indicate the couples with the highest score for each week.
indicates the couples eliminated that week.
indicates the returning couple that finished in the bottom two.
the returning couple that was the last to be called safe.
indicates the winning couple.
indicates the runner-up couple.
indicates the couple who placed third.

=== Average score chart ===
This table only counts for dances scored on a 30-point scale.

Rank by average	Place	Couple	Total points	Number of dances	Average
1	2	Chris & Vanessa	327	13	25.2
2	3	Jess & Jonny	322	13	24.8
3	1	Sam & Aaron	320	13	24.6
4	4	Shavaughn & Enrique	290	12	24.2
5	7	Suzy & Matt	154	7	22.0
6	10	Zac & Kristie	84	4	21.0
6	11	Naz & Tim	63	3	21.0
8	8	Robert & Nicole	120	6	20.0
8	9	Marama & Brad	100	5	20.0
10	6	Roger & Carol-Ann	172	9	19.1
11	12	Gilda & Shae	35	2	17.5
12	5	David & Amelia	185	11	16.8

=== Highest and lowest scoring performances ===
The best and worst performances in each dance according to the judges' 30-point scale are as follows:

Dance	Highest scored dancer(s)	Highest score	Lowest scored dancer(s)	Lowest score
Cha-cha-cha	Jess Quinn	24	Marama Fox	14
Jive	Jess Quinn	29	David Seymour	15
Foxtrot	Shavaughn Raukere	26	David Seymour	16
Samba	Shavaughn Raukere	26	Robert Rakete; Gilda Kirkpatrick	17
Rumba	Chris Harris	29	David Seymour	12
Tango	Suzy Cato; Jess Quinn	25	Gilda Kirkpatrick; Roger Farrelly	18
Quickstep	Chris Harris	28	David Seymour	18
Viennese waltz	Shavaughn Raukere	29	Robert Rakete	18
Waltz	Chris Harris	27	David Seymour	18
Paso doble	Chris Harris	30	David Seymour	13
Argentine tango	Sam Hayes	27	Robert Rakete	21
Charleston	Shavaughn Ruakere	25	Sam Hayes	24
Salsa	Shavaughn Ruakere	22		
Merengue	David Seymour	15		
Reggaeton	Roger Farrelly	19		
Contemporary	Sam Hayes	29	Jess Quinn	24
Freestyle	Chris Harris	30	Shavaughn Raukere	26
Team dance	Roger Farrelly; Jess Quinn; Shavaughn Raukere	24	David Seymour; Sam Hayes; Chris Harris	22

=== Couples' highest and lowest scoring dances ===
Scores are based upon a potential 30-point maximum (team dances are excluded).

Couples	Highest scoring dance(s)	Lowest scoring dance(s)
Chris & Vanessa	Paso doble Freestyle (30)	Cha-cha-cha (18)
Sam & Aaron	Contemporary (29)	Samba (18)
Jess & Jonny	Jive (29)	Samba (21)
Shavaughn & Enrique	Viennese waltz (29)	Cha-cha-cha (20)
David & Amelia	Viennese waltz (21)	Rumba (12)
Roger & Carol-Ann	Viennese waltz Paso doble (20)	Cha-cha-cha (16)
Suzy & Matt	Tango (25)	Quickstep; Viennese waltz Cha-cha-cha; Rumba (21)
Robert & Nicole	Cha-cha-cha (22)	Samba (17)
Marama & Brad	Viennese waltz (24)	Cha-cha-cha (14)
Zac & Kristie	Viennese waltz Paso doble (24)	Jive (17)
Naz & Tim	Tango (24)	Samba (19)
Gilda & Shae	Tango (18)	Samba (17)

== Weekly scores ==
Individual judges' scores in the charts below (given in parentheses) are listed in this order from left to right: Rachel White, Camilla Sacre-Dallerup, Julz Tocker.

=== Week 1 ===
Running order (Night 1)

Couple	Score	Dance	Music
Robert & Nicole	17 (5, 6, 6)	Samba	"Shape of You" — Ed Sheeran
Jess & Jonny	23 (7, 8, 8)	Rumba	"Faded" — Alan Walker
Chris & Vanessa	18 (6, 6, 6)	Cha-cha-cha	"Cake by the Ocean" — DNCE
Gilda & Shae	18 (5, 7, 6)	Tango	"Cell Block Tango" — Chita Rivera
Marama & Brad	17 (5, 6, 6)	Jive	"Ex's & Oh's" — Elle King
Shavaughn & Enrique	20 (6, 7, 7)	Cha-cha-cha	"Damn Girl" — Justin Timberlake
Sam & Aaron	22 (7, 8, 7)	Foxtrot	"Stay" — Rihanna

Running order (Night 2)

Couple	Score	Dance	Music
Roger & Carol-Ann	18 (6, 6, 6)	Jive	"Don't Stop Me Now" — Queen
Zac & Kristie	19 (6, 7, 6)	Tango	"There's Nothing Holdin' Me Back" — Shawn Mendes
Naz & Tim	19 (5, 7, 7)	Samba	"Waka Waka (This Time for Africa)" — Shakira
David & Amelia	15 (5, 5, 5)	Jive	"My Sharona" — The Knack
Suzy & Matt	21 (7, 7, 7)	Quickstep	"Written In The Water" — Gin Wigmore

=== Week 2: Top 40 Night ===
Running order (Night 1)

Couple	Score	Dance	Music	Result
Naz & Tim	24 (8, 8, 8)	Tango	"Outside" — Calvin Harris	Safe
Sam & Aaron	18 (6, 6, 6)	Samba	"Cheap Thrills" — Sia	Safe
Jess & Jonny	23 (7, 8, 8)	Quickstep	"It Ain't Me" — Kygo ft. Selena Gomez	Safe
Shavaughn & Enrique	21 (7, 7, 7)	Rumba	"Too Good at Goodbyes" — Sam Smith	Last to be called safe
Zac & Kristie	24 (7, 9, 8)	Viennese waltz	"Perfect" — Ed Sheeran	Safe
Marama & Brad	14 (5, 5, 4)	Cha-cha-cha	"Feels" — Calvin Harris	Safe
Chris & Vanessa	24 (8, 8, 8)	Foxtrot	"Dancing on My Own" — Calum Scott	Safe
Roger & Carol-Ann	16 (6, 5, 5)	Cha-cha-cha	"Finesse" — Bruno Mars	Safe

Running order (Night 2)

Couple	Score	Dance	Music	Result
Suzy & Matt	21 (7, 7, 7)	Viennese waltz	"Suffer" — Charlie Puth	Safe
Robert & Nicole	21 (7, 7, 7)	Jive	"Feel It Still" — Portugal the Man	Safe
Gilda & Shae	17 (6, 6, 5)	Samba	"Despacito" — Luis Fonsi ft. Daddy Yankee	Eliminated
David & Amelia	20 (6, 7, 7)	Tango	"What About Us" — Pink	Safe

=== Week 3: My Jam Night ===
Running order (Night 1)

Couple	Score	Dance	Music	Result
Shavaughn & Enrique	23 (8, 8, 7)	Quickstep	"Feel the Love" — Rudimental ft. John Newman	Safe
Roger & Carol-Ann	20 (7, 6, 7)	Viennese waltz	"Nothing Else Matters" — Metallica	Safe
Sam & Aaron	20 (6, 7, 7)	Jive	"Dog Days Are Over" — Florence + the Machine	Safe
Jess & Jonny	21 (7, 7, 7)	Samba	"Closer" — Six60	Safe
Zac & Kristie	17 (6, 5, 6)	Jive	"Are You Gonna Be My Girl" — Jet	Last to be called safe
Robert & Nicole	18 (5, 7, 6)	Viennese waltz	"I Have Nothing" — Whitney Houston	Safe
Chris & Vanessa	24 (8, 8, 8)	Jive	"Proud Mary" — Tina Turner	Safe

Running order (Night 2)

Couple	Score	Dance	Music	Result
Naz & Tim	20 (6, 7, 7)	Cha-cha-cha	"Havana" — Camila Cabello	Eliminated
David & Amelia	12 (4, 4, 4)	Rumba	"Drive" — Bic Runga	Safe
Marama & Brad	24 (8, 8, 8)	Viennese waltz	"Tangaroa Whakamautai" — Maisey Rika	Safe
Suzy & Matt	21 (7, 7, 7)	Cha-cha-cha	"Titanium" — David Guetta ft. Sia	Safe

=== Week 4: Musical Icons ===
Running order (Night 1)

Couple	Score	Dance	Music	Result
Marama & Brad	23 (8, 8, 7)	Paso doble	"Tarakihi" — Kiri Te Kanawa	Safe
Chris & Vanessa	20 (6, 7, 7)	Viennese waltz	"Never Tear Us Apart" — INXS	Safe
Suzy & Matt	21 (6, 8, 7)	Rumba	"Love the Way You Lie" — Eminem ft. Rihanna	Safe
Jess & Jonny	24 (7, 9, 8)	Cha-cha-cha	"Señorita" — Justin Timberlake	Safe
Zac & Kristie	24 (8, 8, 8)	Paso doble	"Sweet Child o' Mine" — Guns N' Roses	Eliminated
David & Amelia	18 (6, 6, 6)	Waltz	"Take It to the Limit" — Eagles	Last to be called safe

Running order (Night 2)

Couple	Score	Dance	Music	Result
Shavaughn & Enrique	25 (9, 8, 8)	Paso doble	"Are You Gonna Go My Way" — Lenny Kravitz	Safe
Sam & Aaron	26 (9, 8, 9)	Rumba	"Halo" — Beyoncé	Safe
Robert & Nicole	21 (7, 7, 7)	Quickstep	"Faith" — George Michael	Safe
Roger & Carol-Ann	18 (6, 6, 6)	Samba	"Copacabana" — Barry Manilow	Safe

=== Week 5: Prohibition Party ===
Running order (Night 1)

Couple	Score	Dance	Music	Result
David & Amelia	15 (5, 5, 5)	Cha-cha-cha	"Summer" — Calvin Harris	Safe
Shavaughn & Enrique	25 (8, 9, 8)	Charleston	"Do Your Thing" — Basement Jaxx	Safe
Marama & Brad	22 (7, 8, 7)	Foxtrot	"All About That Bass" — Meghan Trainor	Eliminated
Chris & Vanessa	23 (8, 8, 7)	Argentine tango	"Roxanne" — The Police	Bottom two
Jess & Jonny	24 (8, 8, 8)	Foxtrot	"Young and Beautiful" — Lana Del Rey	Safe
Roger & Carol-Ann	19 (7, 6, 6)	Quickstep	"Black Betty" — Ram Jam	Safe

Running order (Night 2)

Couple	Score	Dance	Music	Result
Sam & Aaron	24 (8, 8, 8)	Charleston	"Crazy in Love" — Beyoncé ft. Jay-Z	Safe
Robert & Nicole	21 (7, 7, 7)	Argentine tango	"Asi se Baila el Tango" — Veronica Verdier	Safe
Suzy & Matt	22 (7, 8, 7)	Jive	"Hit the Road Jack" — Ray Charles	Safe

=== Week 6: Trio Week ===
Running order (Night 1)

Couple (Trio Dance Partner)	Score	Dance	Music	Result
Shavaughn & Enrique (Krystal Stuart)	23 (7, 9, 7)	Jive	"Hey Ya!" — OutKast	Bottom two
Chris & Vanessa (Scott Cole)	27 (9, 9, 9)	Paso doble	"Lightning Crashes" — Live	Last to be called safe
Robert & Nicole (Fabio Coco)	22 (7, 8, 7)	Cha-cha-cha	"This Girl" — Kungs vs. Cookin' on 3 Burners	Eliminated
Sam & Aaron (Daniel Wilks)	26 (8, 9, 9)	Viennese waltz	"Say Something" — A Great Big World and Christina Aguilera	Safe
David & Amelia (Brittany Coleman)	16 (6, 5, 5)	Foxtrot	"I Just Want to Make Love to You" — Etta James	Safe
Suzy & Matt (Shae Mountain)	25 (9, 8, 8)	Tango	"Thunderstruck" — AC/DC	Safe

Running order (Night 2)

Couple (Trio Dance Partner)	Score	Dance	Music	Result
Roger & Carol-Ann (Kirstin Wilks)	20 (6, 7, 7)	Paso doble	"Sail" — Awolnation	Safe
Jess & Jonny (James Luck)	26 (8, 9, 9)	Viennese waltz	"Hallelujah" — Pentatonix	Safe

=== Week 7: Latin Night ===
Running order (Night 1)

Couple	Score	Dance	Music	Result
Suzy & Matt	23 (8, 7, 8)	Samba	"Bootylicious" — Destiny's Child	Eliminated
Shavaughn & Enrique	22 (8, 7, 7)	Salsa	"Get Lucky" — Daft Punk ft. Pharrell Williams	Bottom two
David & Amelia	15 (5, 5, 5)	Merengue	"Sweat" — Snoop Dogg vs. David Guetta	Safe
Jess & Jonny	22 (7, 8, 7)	Paso doble	"Stronger (What Doesn't Kill You)" — Kelly Clarkson	Safe
Roger & Carol-Ann	19 (7, 6, 6)	Reggaeton	"Gasolina" — Daddy Yankee	Safe

Running order (Night 2)

Couple	Score	Dance	Music	Result
Chris & Vanessa	25 (9, 8, 8)	Samba	"Mas que Nada" — Sérgio Mendes	Safe
Sam & Aaron	25 (8, 8, 9)	Paso doble	"Don't You Worry Child" — Swedish House Mafia ft John Martin	Safe

=== Week 8 ===
Running order (Night 1 - Winter Solstice)

Couple	Score	Dance	Music	Result
Roger & Carol-Ann	18 (5, 7, 6)	Tango	"Rain" — Dragon	Eliminated
Jess & Jonny	24 (8, 8, 8)	Contemporary	"It Will Rain" — Bruno Mars	Bottom two
Shavaughn & Enrique	26 (9, 9, 8)	Foxtrot	"Frozen" — Madonna	Safe
Chris & Vanessa	27 (9, 9, 9)	Waltz	"The Long day is over" — Norah Jones	Safe
David & Amelia	21 (7, 7, 7)	Viennese waltz	"Snowman" — Sia	Safe
Sam & Aaron	29 (9, 10, 10)	Contemporary	"Cold" — Maroon 5 ft. Future	Safe

Running order (Night 2 - Team Dance)

Team	Score	Dance	Music
Team Lean: Roger & Carol-Ann; Jess & Jonny; Shavaughn & Enrique	24 (8, 8, 8)	Tango/Paso doble Fusion	"Smooth Criminal" — Michael Jackson
Team Lucky Dip: David & Amelia; Sam & Aaron; Chris & Vanessa	22 (7, 7, 8)	Foxtrot/Cha-cha-cha Fusion	"I Gotta Feeling" — The Black Eyed Peas

=== Week 9: 90s/Most Memorable Year Week (Semi-finals) ===
Running order

Couple	Score	Dance	Music	Result
Shavaughn & Enrique	26 (9, 9, 8)	Samba	"Jump Around" — House of Pain	Bottom two
Shavaughn & Enrique	29 (10, 10, 9)	Viennese waltz	"Breakaway" — Kelly Clarkson	Bottom two
Jess & Jonny	25 (8, 8, 9)	Tango	"Black or White" — Michael Jackson	Safe
Jess & Jonny	29 (9, 10, 10)	Jive	"I'm Still Standing" — Elton John	Safe
Chris & Vanessa	29 (10, 10, 9)	Rumba	"Stay" — Shakespears Sister	Safe
Chris & Vanessa	28 (10, 9, 9)	Quickstep	"Kryptonite" — 3 Doors Down	Safe
Sam & Aaron	23 (8, 7, 8)	Cha-cha-cha	"Crush" — Jennifer Paige	Safe
Sam & Aaron	27 (9, 9, 9)	Argentine tango	"Santa Maria" — Gotan Project	Safe
David & Amelia	13 (4, 5, 4)	Paso doble	"Song 2" — Blur	Eliminated
David & Amelia	18 (6, 6, 6)	Quickstep	"Title" — Meghan Trainor	Eliminated

=== Week 10: Grand Final ===
Running order

Couple	Score	Dance	Music	Result
Chris & Vanessa	30 (10, 10, 10)	Freestyle	"Let's Dance" — David Bowie	Runners-up
Chris & Vanessa	30 (10, 10, 10)	Paso doble	"Lightning Crashes" — Live	Runners-up
Jess & Jonny	28 (9, 9, 10)	Freestyle	"Impossible" — James Arthur	Third Place
Jess & Jonny	29 (9, 10, 10)	Cha-cha-cha	"Señorita" — Justin Timberlake	Third Place
Shavaughn & Enrique	26 (8, 9, 9)	Freestyle	"Islands in the Stream" — Kenny Rogers & Dolly Parton	Eliminated
Sam & Aaron	29 (9, 10, 10)	Freestyle	"Feel So Close" — Calvin Harris	Winners
Sam & Aaron	29 (9, 10, 10)	Contemporary	"Cold" — Maroon 5 ft. Future	Winners

== Dance chart ==
Highest scoring dance
Lowest scoring dance

Couple	1	2	3	4	5	6	7	8		9		10	
Sam & Aaron	Foxtrot	Samba	Jive	Rumba	Charleston	Viennese waltz	Paso doble	Contemporary	Foxtrot/Cha-cha-cha Fusion (Team Lucky Dip)	Cha-cha-cha	Argentine tango	Freestyle	Contemporary
Chris & Vanessa	Cha-cha-cha	Foxtrot	Jive	Viennese waltz	Argentine tango	Paso doble	Samba	Waltz	Foxtrot/Cha-cha-cha Fusion (Team Lucky Dip)	Rumba	Quickstep	Freestyle	Paso doble
Jess & Jonny	Rumba	Quickstep	Samba	Cha-cha-cha	Foxtrot	Viennese waltz	Paso doble	Contemporary	Tango/Paso doble Fusion (Team Lean)	Tango	Jive	Freestyle	Cha-cha-cha
Shavaughn & Enrique	Cha-cha-cha	Rumba	Quickstep	Paso doble	Charleston	Jive	Salsa	Foxtrot	Tango/Paso doble Fusion (Team Lean)	Samba	Viennese waltz	Freestyle	
David & Amelia	Jive	Tango	Rumba	Waltz	Cha-cha-cha	Foxtrot	Merengue	Viennese waltz	Foxtrot/Cha-cha-cha Fusion (Team Lucky Dip)	Paso doble	Quickstep		
Roger & Carol-Ann	Jive	Cha-cha-cha	Viennese waltz	Samba	Quickstep	Paso doble	Reggaeton	Tango	Tango/Paso doble Fusion (Team Lean)				
Suzy & Matt	Quickstep	Viennese waltz	Cha-cha-cha	Rumba	Jive	Tango	Samba						
Robert & Nicole	Samba	Jive	Viennese waltz	Quickstep	Argentine tango	Cha-cha-cha							
Marama & Brad	Jive	Cha-cha-cha	Viennese waltz	Paso doble	Foxtrot								
Zac & Kristie	Tango	Viennese waltz	Jive	Paso doble									
Naz & Tim	Samba	Tango	Cha-cha-cha										
Gilda & Shae	Tango	Samba											
