= Dancing with the Stars (New Zealand TV series) series 3 =

Dancing with the Stars
- Season 3
- Celebrity winner: Suzanne Paul
- Professional winner: Stefano Oliveri
- No. of episodes: 8

Release
- Original network: TV One
- Original release: 10 April – 29 May 2007

Series chronology
- ← Previous; Season 2 Next → Season 4

The third series of Dancing with the Stars premiered on 10 April 2007, with both Jason Gunn and Candy Lane coming back to host. All judges were back with the exception of Paul Mercurio who wanted to focus more on the Australian version of Dancing with the Stars. In season three, it opened with 735,000 people watching, the highest out of all series' debuts. On 29 May 2007, Suzanne Paul and her partner Stefano Olivieri took the title of Dancing with the Stars.

== Couples ==
Celebrity	Occupation	Professional partner	Placing
Suzanne Paul	Television presenter	Stefano Olivieri	Winners on 29 May 2007
Megan Alatini	Singer-songwriter	Jonny Williams	Runners-up on 29 May 2007
Brendon Pongia	Former National Basketball League guard	Hayley Holt	Eliminated 6th on 22 May 2007
Greer Robson	Shortland Street actress	Aaron Gilmore	Eliminated 5th on 15 May 2007
Paul Holmes	Television & radio broadcaster	Rebecca Nicholson	Eliminated 4th on 8 May 2007
Frank Bunce	Former rugby union player	Krystal Stuart	Eliminated 3rd on 1 May 2007
Michael Laws	Whanganui mayor	Lauren de Boeck	Eliminated 2nd on 24 April 2007
April Bruce	Television presenter	Csaba Szirmai	Eliminated 1st on 17 April 2007

== Scorecard ==
Red numbers indicate the couples with the lowest score for each week.
Green numbers indicate the couples with the highest score for each week.
indicates the couples eliminated that week.
indicates the returning couple that finished in the bottom two.
indicates the winning couple.
indicates the runner-up couple.

Team	Place	1	2	1+2	3	4	5	6	7	8
Suzanne & Stefano	1	30	35	65	32	29	29+31=60	25+36=61	25+32=57	31+36+39=106
Megan & Jonny	2	32	36	68	30	30	31+32=63	32+34=66	32+38=70	32+37+36=105
Brendon & Hayley	3	30	28	58	24	30	21+26=47	28+38=66	30+26=56	
Greer & Aaron	4	23	33	56	19	35	29+27=56	26+28=54		
Paul & Rebecca	5	27	22	49	15	23	16+18=34			
Frank & Krystal	6	23	33	56	27	16				
Michael & Lauren	7	17	19	36	9					
April & Csaba	8	23	21	44						

== Dance Chart ==
Highest Scoring Dance
Lowest Scoring Dance

Team	1	2	3	4	5		6		7		8		
Suzanne & Stefano	Cha-Cha-Cha	Quickstep	Jive	Foxtrot	Samba	Swing Waltz	Rumba	Tango	Waltz	Paso Doble	Cha-Cha-Cha	Tango	Freestyle
Megan & Jonny	Waltz	Rumba	Tango	Foxtrot	Samba	Swing Waltz	Paso Doble	Quickstep	Jive	Cha-Cha-Cha	Quickstep	Rumba	Freestyle
Brendon & Hayley	Cha-Cha-Cha	Quickstep	Jive	Foxtrot	Samba	Swing Waltz	Paso Doble	Waltz	Rumba	Tango			
Greer & Aaron	Waltz	Rumba	Tango	Paso Doble	Samba	Swing Waltz	Jive	Quickstep					
Paul & Rebecca	Waltz	Rumba	Tango	Paso Doble	Samba	Swing Waltz							
Frank & Krystal	Waltz	Rumba	Tango	Paso Doble									
Michael & Lauren	Cha-Cha-Cha	Quickstep	Jive										
April & Csaba	Cha-Cha-Cha	Quickstep											

== Average chart ==
Rank by average	Competition finish	Couple	Total	Number of dances	Average
1	2	Megan & Jonny	432	13	33.2
2	1	Suzanne & Stefano	410	13	31.5
3	3	Brendon & Hayley	281	10	28.1
4	4	Greer & Aaron	220	8	27.5
5	6	Frank & Krystal	99	4	24.8
6	8	April & Csaba	44	2	22.0
7	5	Paul & Rebecca	121	6	20.2
8	7	Michael & Lauren	45	3	15.0

== Weekly scores ==
Individual judges scores in the chart below (given in parentheses) are listed in this order from left to right: Brendan Cole, Carol-Ann Hickmore, Craig Revel Horwood, Alison Leonard.

=== Week 1: First Dances ===
Couples are listed in the order they performed.

Couple	Scores	Dance	Music
Paul & Rebecca	27 (7, 7, 6, 7)	Waltz	" "—
Michael & Lauren	17 (3, 6, 3, 5)	Cha-cha-cha	" "—
Megan & Jonny	32 (8, 9, 7, 8)	Waltz	" "—
Suzanne & Stefano	30 (7, 8, 8, 7)	Cha-cha-cha	" "—
Greer & Aaron	23 (5, 7, 4, 7)	Waltz	" "—
Brendon & Hayley	30 (8, 8, 6, 8)	Cha-cha-cha	" "—
Frank & Krystal	23 (6, 8, 3, 6)	Waltz	" "—
April & Csaba	23 (4, 6, 6, 7)	Cha-cha-cha	" "—

=== Week 2: First Elimination ===
Couples are listed in the order they performed.

Couple	Scores	Dance	Music	Result
Greer & Aaron	33 (7, 9, 8, 9)	Rumba	" "—	Safe
April & Csaba	21 (3, 6, 6, 6)	Quickstep	" "—	Eliminated
Frank & Krystal	33 (8, 8, 8, 9)	Rumba	" "—	Safe
Michael & Lauren	19 (5, 5, 4, 5)	Quickstep	" "—	Bottom two
Paul & Rebecca	22 (5, 6, 5, 6)	Rumba	" "—	Safe
Suzanne & Stefano	35 (9, 9, 8, 9)	Quickstep	" "—	Safe
Megan & Jonny	36 (9, 9, 9, 9)	Rumba	" "—	Safe
Brendon & Hayley	28 (7, 8, 6, 7)	Quickstep	" "—	Safe

=== Week 3 ===
Couples are listed in the order they performed.

Couple	Scores	Dance	Music	Result
Frank & Krystal	27 (7, 6, 7, 7)	Tango	" "—	Bottom two
Brendon & Hayley	24 (5, 7, 5, 7)	Jive	" "—	Safe
Greer & Aaron	19 (5, 5, 3, 6)	Tango	" "—	Safe
Suzanne & Stefano	32 (7, 9, 8, 8)	Jive	" "—	Safe
Megan & Jonny	30 (7, 7, 8, 8)	Tango	" "—	Safe
Michael & Lauren	9 (2, 3, 1, 3)	Jive	" "—	Eliminated
Paul & Rebecca	15 (4, 4, 2, 5)	Tango	" "—	Safe

=== Week 4 ===
Couples are listed in the order they performed.

Couple	Scores	Dance	Music	Result
Suzanne & Stefano	29 (7, 7, 6, 9)	Foxtrot	" "—	Safe
Paul & Rebecca	23 (7, 6, 3, 7)	Paso Doble	" "—	Safe
Brendon & Hayley	30 (8, 8, 7, 7)	Foxtrot	" "—	Safe
Frank & Krystal	16 (4, 5, 2, 5)	Paso Doble	" "—	Eliminated
Megan & Jonny	30 (7, 7, 8, 8)	Foxtrot	" "—	Bottom two
Greer & Aaron	35 (9, 9, 8, 9)	Paso Doble	" "—	Safe

=== Week 5 ===
Couples are listed in the order they performed.

Couple	Scores	Dance	Music	Result
Brendon & Hayley	21 (4, 6, 5, 6)	Samba	" "—	Bottom two
Brendon & Hayley	26 (6, 7, 6, 7)	Swing Waltz	" "—	Bottom two
Megan & Jonny	31 (7, 9, 7, 8)	Samba	" "—	Safe
Megan & Jonny	32 (7, 8, 8, 9)	Swing Waltz	" "—	Safe
Greer & Aaron	29 (8, 9, 4, 8)	Samba	" "—	Safe
Greer & Aaron	27 (7, 7, 6, 7)	Swing Waltz	" "—	Safe
Paul & Rebecca	16 (3, 5, 3, 5)	Samba	" "—	Eliminated
Paul & Rebecca	18 (4, 5, 4, 5)	Swing Waltz	" "—	Eliminated
Suzanne & Stefano	29 (7, 7, 7, 8)	Samba	" "—	Safe
Suzanne & Stefano	31 (6, 9, 8, 8)	Swing Waltz	" "—	Safe

=== Week 6 ===
Couples are listed in the order they performed.

Couple	Scores	Dance	Music	Result
Megan & Jonny	32 (8, 8, 7, 9)	Paso Doble	" "—	Safe
Megan & Jonny	34 (8, 8, 8, 10)	Quickstep	" "—	Safe
Suzanne & Stefano	25 (5, 7, 6, 7)	Rumba	" "—	Bottom two
Suzanne & Stefano	36 (8, 9, 9, 10)	Tango	" "—	Bottom two
Greer & Aaron	26 (7, 7, 5, 7)	Jive	" "—	Eliminated
Greer & Aaron	28 (6, 7, 7, 8)	Quickstep	" "—	Eliminated
Brendon & Hayley	28 (7, 7, 7, 7)	Paso Doble	" "—	Safe
Brendon & Hayley	38 (9, 10, 9, 10)	Waltz	" "—	Safe

=== Week 7 ===
Couples are listed in the order they performed.

Couple	Scores	Dance	Music	Result
Suzanne & Stefano	25 (6, 7, 5, 7)	Waltz	" "—	Bottom two
Suzanne & Stefano	32 (8, 8, 8, 8)	Paso Doble	" "—	Bottom two
Brendon & Hayley	30 (6, 8, 8, 8)	Rumba	" "—	Eliminated
Brendon & Hayley	26 (6, 7, 6, 7)	Tango	" "—	Eliminated
Megan & Jonny	32 (7, 8, 9, 8)	Jive	" "—	Safe
Megan & Jonny	38 (9, 10, 9, 10)	Cha-cha-cha	" "—	Safe

=== Week 8: Final ===
Couples are listed in the order they performed.

Couple	Scores	Dance	Music	Result
Suzanne & Stefano	31 (7, 8, 7, 9)	Cha-cha-cha	" "—	Winners
Suzanne & Stefano	36 (9, 9, 9, 9)	Tango	" "—	Winners
Suzanne & Stefano	39 (9, 10, 10, 10)	Freestyle	" "—	Winners
Megan & Jonny	32 (7, 9, 7, 9)	Quickstep	" "—	Runners-up
Megan & Jonny	37 (9, 10, 8, 10)	Rumba	" "—	Runners-up
Megan & Jonny	36 (8, 10, 8, 10)	Freestyle	" "—	Runners-up
