= Dancing with the Stars (New Zealand TV series) =

New Zealand TV series

- Created by: BBC
- Presented by: Jason Gunn; Candy Lane; Dominic Bowden; Sharyn Casey; Dai Henwood; Clinton Randell
- Judges: Alison Leonard; Brendan Cole; Paul Mercurio; Donna Dawson; Carol-Ann Hickmore; Craig Revel Horwood; Candy Lane; Stefano Olivieri; Hayley Holt; Rachel White; Camilla Sacre-Dallerup; Julz Tocker; James Luck; Lance Savali
- Voices of: Grant Walker
- Country of origin: New Zealand
- No. of seasons: 9
- No. of episodes: 87

Production
- Production locations: Avalon Studios (2005–2009); South Pacific Pictures (2015, 2018–2019)
- Running time: 60–120 minutes (with commercials)

Original release
- Network: TV One (2005–2009); Three (2015, 2018–)
- Release: 1 May 2005 – 29 May 2022

Dancing with the Stars is a New Zealand television dance contest based on the British TV series Strictly Come Dancing and is part of the Dancing with the Stars franchise. The show introduces New Zealand celebrities paired with professional ballroom dancers who each week compete against each other in a competition to impress a panel of judges and the viewing public in order to survive potential elimination. Through a telephone poll, viewers vote for those couples who should stay. The public vote and the average score given by the panel of judges equally go towards deciding who should leave. Proceeds from the voting go to the celebrity contestant's charity of choice.

== History ==
Dancing with the Stars has been popular with the New Zealand public. The first series, which aired in 2005, was the highest rated timeslot programme, averaged 730,000 people per episode, while the second series had an average of 804,000. Up to a million people tuned into each of the series finales. The third series premiered in 2007 with 735,000 viewers, the fourth series premiered in 2008 with 720,000 viewers, and the fifth series premiered with over 800,000 viewers, the highest of all previous series debuts.

From 2005 to 2009, the show was hosted by television personality Jason Gunn and co-hosted by professional dancer Candy Lane. All music was performed live by the Dancing with the Stars band, led by musical director Carl Doy. For the 2015 series, the show was hosted by Dominic Bowden and co-hosted by radio personality Sharyn Casey.

TVNZ announced in November 2009 that the show would not be returning in 2010, due to the economic climate. In November 2013, television production house Great Southern Television announced that it had acquired the New Zealand rights to the show and would be pitching a new series to all broadcasters. In March 2015, it was announced that Dancing with the Stars had been picked up by TV3 for a sixth series, which began airing in May 2015. In December 2017, it was that announced that a seventh series would air, this began in April 2018. In November 2018, it was announced that the eighth series would air, beginning in April 2019.

In December 2019, it was that announced that a ninth series would air on Three in 2020. On 11 February 2020, the show announced that former contestant Laura Daniel would be replacing Rachel White on the judging panel for the ninth series. On 23 February 2020, The New Zealand Herald reported that Destiny Church Pastor and Vision NZ leader Hannah Tamaki was tipped to join the series. After major backlash online, MediaWorks confirmed that Tamaki would no longer be joining the series. In the same statement, they confirmed that the cast announcement for the ninth series is scheduled for the end of March 2020. However, due to the COVID-19 pandemic in New Zealand, the series has been postponed indefinitely. In March 2022 it was confirmed that the show will return later that year. In April it was announced that judges Julz Tocker and Rachel White would be replaced by James Luck and Lance Savali.

== Judging panel ==
Judge	Series 1	Series 2	Series 3	Series 4	Series 5	Series 6	Series 7	Series 8	Series 9
Alison Leonard									
Brendan Cole									
Paul Mercurio									
Donna Dawson									
Carol-Ann Hickmore									
Craig Revel Horwood									
Candy Lane									
Stefano Olivieri									
Hayley Holt									
Rachel White									
Camilla Sacre-Dallerup									
Julz Tocker									
James Luck									
Lance Savali									

== Professional dancers and their partners ==
Professional dancers	Series 1	Series 2	Series 3	Series 4	Series 5	Series 6	Series 7	Series 8	Series 9
Current
Aaron Gilmore	—N/a	Lorraine Downes	Greer Robson	Tina Cross	Rebecca Hobbs	—N/a	Sam Hayes	Nadia Lim	Sonia Gray
Jonny Williams	—N/a	Angela Bloomfield	Megan Alatini	Miriama Smith	Barbara Kendall	Chrystal Chenery	Jess Quinn	Carolyn Taylor	Eli Matthewson
Enrique Jones	—N/a					Jay-Jay Harvey	Shavaughn Ruakere	—N/a	Brodie Kane
Kristie Williams	—N/a				Christopher Hobbs	Colin Mathura-Jeffree	Zac Franich	Mike McRoberts	David Letele
Brad Coleman	—N/a						Marama Fox	Anna Willcox-Silfverberg	Jazz Thornton
Brittany Coleman	—N/a							Clinton Randell	Alex Vaz
Loryn Reynolds	—N/a							Manu Vatuvei	Eric Murray
Jared Neame	—N/a								Kerre McIvor
Phoebe Robb	—N/a								Rhys Mathewson
Former
Carol-Ann Hickmore	Norm Hewitt	—N/a					Roger Farrelly	—N/a	
d'Artagnan Kennedy	Bernice Mene	—N/a							
Kiel de Buisson	Nicky Watson	—N/a							
Lauren de Boeck	Ewen Gilmour	—N/a	Michael Laws	Martin Devlin	—N/a				
Michael Hoggard	Georgina Beyer	—N/a							
Nerida Cortese	Shane Cortese	—N/a		Monty Betham	—N/a	Shane Cameron	—N/a		
Peter Wales	Theresa Healey	—N/a							
Rebecca Nicholson	Tim Shadbolt	David Wikaira-Paul	Paul Holmes	Cory Hutchings	—N/a				
Brian Jones	—N/a	Beatrice Faumuina	—N/a	Geeling Ng	—N/a				
David Yeates	—N/a	Christine Rankin	—N/a						
Hayley Holt	—N/a	Danyon Loader	Brendon Pongia	Peter Urlich	—N/a				
Krystal Stuart	—N/a	Rodney Hide	Frank Bunce	—N/a	John Rowles	Ben Barrington	—N/a		
Sharan Phillips	—N/a	Steve Gurney	—N/a						
Csaba Szirmai	—N/a		April Bruce	—N/a					
Stefano Olivieri	—N/a		Suzanne Paul	Temepara George	Geraldine Brophy	—N/a			
Cody Stephens	—N/a				Lizzy Igasan	—N/a			
Rachel Burstein	—N/a				Josh Kronfeld	—N/a			
Samantha Hitchcock	—N/a				Tāmati Coffey	—N/a			
Caryn Lin	—N/a					Maz Quinn	—N/a		
Charlie Billington	—N/a					Siobhan Marshall	—N/a		
Matt Tatton-Brown	—N/a					Pam Corkery	Suzy Cato	Jude Dobson	—N/a
Scott Cole	—N/a					Teuila Blakely	—N/a	K'Lee	—N/a
Vanessa Cole	—N/a					Simon Barnett	Chris Harris	Glen Osborne	—N/a
Amelia McGregor	—N/a						David Seymour	William Waiirua	—N/a
Nicole Harrington	—N/a						Robert Rakete	—N/a	
Shae Mountain	—N/a						Gilda Kirkpatrick	Laura Daniel	—N/a
Tim Mullayanov	—N/a						Naz Khanjani	—N/a	
Melissa McCallum	—N/a							Walter Neilands	—N/a

Key:

Winner of the series
(2nd)
(3rd)
(4th)
First elimination of the series
Withdrew from the series
Participating in current series

== Series overview ==
Series	No. of stars	Duration dates		Celebrity honour places		
Series	No. of stars	Premiere	Finale	Winner	Second place	Third place
1	8	1 May 2005	19 June 2005	Norm Hewitt & Carol-Ann Hickmore	Shane Cortese & Nerida Lister	—N/a
2	8	7 May 2006	25 June 2006	Lorraine Downes & Aaron Gilmore	Beatrice Faumuina & Brian Jones	—N/a
3	8	10 April 2007	29 May 2007	Suzanne Paul & Stefano Oliveri	Megan Alatini & Jonny Williams	—N/a
4	8	26 February 2008	15 April 2008	Temepara George & Stefano Oliveri	Monty Betham & Nerida Jantti	—N/a
5	8	3 March 2009	21 April 2009	Tāmati Coffey & Samantha Hitchcock	Barbara Kendall & Jonny Williams	—N/a
6	10	31 May 2015	19 July 2015	Simon Barnett & Vanessa Cole	Chrystal Chenery & Jonny Williams	Siobhan Marshall & Charlie Billington
7	12	29 April 2018	1 July 2018	Samantha Hayes & Aaron Gilmore	Chris Harris & Vanessa Cole	Jess Quinn & Jonny Williams
8	12	14 April 2019	16 June 2019	Manu Vatuvei & Loryn Reynolds	Laura Daniel & Shae Mountain	Clinton Randell & Brittany Coleman
9	9	24 April 2022	29 May 2022	Jazz Thornton & Brad Coleman	Brodie Kane & Enrique Jones	David Letele & Kristie Williams

=== List of dances ===
The following are a list of dances that contestants and their partners have performed in an episode:

Ballroom Dances	Latin Dances
Foxtrot; Quickstep; Tango; Waltz; Viennese Waltz	Cha-cha-cha; Jive; Pasodoble; Rumba; Samba

In the sixth series, the Argentine Tango and Salsa were also performed. In the seventh series, the Charleston and Reggaeton were also performed. The Hip hop and Contemporary made their debut in eighth series.
