= Dancing with the Stars (New Zealand TV series) series 2 =

Dancing with the Stars
- Season 2
- Celebrity winner: Lorraine Downes
- Professional winner: Aaron Gilmore
- No. of episodes: 8

Release
- Original network: TV One
- Original release: 7 May – 25 June 2006

Series chronology
- ← Previous; Season 1 Next → Season 3

The second series of Dancing with the Stars premiered on 7 May 2006. It had an average of 804,000 people watching, more than the first series, and up to a million tuned into the finale. Rebecca Nicholson (who partnered Tim Shadbolt in the first series) was the only dancer to be part of the series, and partnered Shortland Street actor David Wikaira-Paul. One of the most memorable moments in series two was celebrity Rodney Hide and his partner Krystal Stuart, who were awarded only one point from each judge for his cha-cha-cha, but also dropped her during the end of the performance. On 25 June, Lorraine Downes and her partner Aaron Gilmore took the title of Dancing with the Stars, who ended up winning $111,961.63 for her charity, of the total $333,655, raised for all charities over the series. According to a TVNZ news release, Lorraine Downes won the votes from the public by a slim 0.1%, winning 50.05%, to Faumuina's 49.95%.

== Contestants ==
Celebrity	Occupation	Professional partner	Placing
Lorraine Downes	Miss Universe 1983	Aaron Gilmore	Winners on 25 June 2006
Beatrice Faumuina	Olympic discus thrower	Brian Jones	Runners-up on 25 June 2006
Danyon Loader	Olympic swimmer	Hayley Holt	Eliminated 6th on 18 June 2006
Rodney Hide	ACT Party politician	Krystal Stuart	Eliminated 5th on 11 June 2006
Angela Bloomfield	Shortland Street actress	Jonny Williams	Eliminated 4th on 4 June 2006
David Wikaira-Paul	Shortland Street actor	Rebecca Nicholson	Eliminated 3rd on 28 May 2006
Steve Gurney	Coast to Coast athlete	Sharan Phillips	Eliminated 2nd on 21 May 2006
Christine Rankin	Former Work & Income CEO	David Yeates	Eliminated 1st on 14 May 2006

== Scorecard ==
Red numbers indicate the couples with the lowest score for each week.
Green numbers indicate the couples with the highest score for each week.
indicates the couples eliminated that week.
indicates the returning couple that finished in the bottom two.
indicates the winning couple.
indicates the runner-up couple.

Team	Place	1	2	1+2	3	4	5	6	7	8
Lorraine & Aaron	1	28	28	56	36	28	32+32=64	32+37=69	30+37=67	37+38+40=115
Beatrice & Brian	2	32	26	58	32	34	29+30=59	29+36=65	32+31=63	32+36+37=105
Danyon & Hayley	3	24	33	57	27	25	27+31=58	35+36=71	29+35=64	
Rodney & Krystal	4	23	19	42	24	13	16+26=42	15+4=19		
Angela & Jonny	5	26	25	51	28	26	25+27=52			
David & Rebecca	6	31	25	56	36	26				
Steve & Sharan	7	24	29	53	23					
Christine & David	8	24	27	51						

=== Dance Chart ===
Highest scoring dance
Lowest scoring dance

Team	1	2	3	4	5		6		7		8		
Lorraine & Aaron	Cha-Cha-Cha	Quickstep	Jive	Foxtrot	Samba	Viennese Waltz	Waltz	Rumba	Tango	Paso Doble	Waltz	Paso Doble	Freestyle
Beatrice & Brian	Waltz	Rumba	Tango	Paso Doble	Samba	Viennese Waltz	Quickstep	Jive	Foxtrot	Cha-Cha-Cha	Tango	Jive	Freestyle
Danyon & Hayley	Cha-Cha-Cha	Quickstep	Jive	Foxtrot	Samba	Viennese Waltz	Tango	Paso Doble	Rumba	Waltz			
Rodney & Krystal	Waltz	Rumba	Tango	Paso Doble	Samba	Viennese Waltz	Foxtrot	Cha-Cha-Cha					
Angela & Jonny	Cha-Cha-Cha	Quickstep	Jive	Paso Doble	Samba	Viennese Waltz							
David & Rebecca	Cha-Cha-Cha	Quickstep	Jive	Foxtrot									
Steve & Sharan	Waltz	Rumba	Tango										
Christine & David	Waltz	Rumba											

=== Average chart ===
Rank by average	Competition finish	Couple	Total	Number of dances	Average
1	1	Lorraine & Aaron	435	13	33.5
2	2	Beatrice & Brian	416	13	32.0
3	3	Danyon & Hayley	312	10	31.2
4	6	David & Rebecca	118	4	29.5
5	5	Angela & Jonny	157	6	26.2
6	8	Christine & David	51	2	25.5
7	7	Steve & Sharan	76	3	25.3
8	4	Rodney & Krystal	140	8	17.5

=== Week 1 ===
Individual judges scores in the chart below (given in parentheses) are listed in this order from left to right: Brendan, Alison, Paul, Carol-Ann.

Running order
