= Dancing with the Stars (New Zealand TV series) series 4 =

Dancing with the Stars
- Season 4
- Celebrity winner: Temepara George
- Professional winner: Stefano Oliveri
- No. of episodes: 15

Release
- Original network: TV One
- Original release: 26 February – 15 April 2008

Series chronology
- ← Previous; Season 3 Next → Season 5

The fourth series of Dancing with the Stars premiered on 26 February 2008. The contestants were announced in two groups of four in December 2007 and January 2008.

== Couples ==
Celebrity	Occupation	Professional partner	Placing
Temepara George	Former netball player	Stefano Olivieri	Winners on 15 April 2008
Monty Betham	Professional boxer	Nerida Jantti	Runners-up on 15 April 2008
Miriama Smith	Film & television actress	Jonny Williams	Eliminated 6th on 8 April 2008
Cory Hutchings	Ironman competitor & television presenter	Rebecca Nicholson	Eliminated 5th on 1 April 2008
Tina Cross	Koo De Tah singer & actress	Aaron Gilmore	Eliminated 4th on 25 March 2008
Martin Devlin	Television & radio presenter	Lauren de Boeck	Eliminated 3rd on 18 March 2008
Peter Urlich	Musician & DJ	Hayley Holt	Eliminated 2nd on 11 March 2008
Geeling Ng	Actress & restaurateur	Brian Jones	Eliminated 1st on 4 March 2008

Netball star Temepara George and her professional Stefano beat boxing champion Monty Betham and his pro Nerida.

== Scorecard ==
Red numbers indicate the couples with the lowest score for each week.
Green numbers indicate the couples with the highest score for each week.
indicates the couples eliminated that week.
indicates the returning couple that finished in the bottom two.
indicates the winning couple.
indicates the runner-up couple.

Team	Place	1	2	1+2	3	4	5	6	7	8
Temepara & Stefano	1	29	31	60	33	34	34+33=67	34+30=64	34+36=70	37+36+39=112
Monty & Nerida	2	23	23	46	26	29	30+25=55	29+27=56	35+29=64	33+38+37=108
Miriama & Jonny	3	35	28	63	36	32	37+31=68	33+21=54	33+35=68	
Cory & Rebecca	4	23	27	50	20	29	21+27=48	25+27=52		
Tina & Aaron	5	32	29	61	31	34	24+29=53			
Martin & Lauren	6	21	18	39	28	18				
Peter & Hayley	7	34	14	48	17					
Geeling & Brian	8	17	23	40						

== Dance Chart ==
Highest Scoring Dance
Lowest Scoring Dance

Team	1	2	3	4	5		6		7		8		
Temepara & Stefano	Cha-Cha-Cha	Quickstep	Jive	Foxtrot	Samba	Viennese Waltz	Tango	Rumba	Paso Doble	Waltz	Foxtrot	Samba	Freestyle
Monty & Nerida	Cha-Cha-Cha	Quickstep	Jive	Foxtrot	Samba	Viennese Walz	Waltz	Rumba	Paso Doble	Tango	Quickstep	Paso Doble	Freestyle
Miriama & Jonny	Waltz	Rumba	Tango	Paso Doble	Samba	Viennese Waltz	Quickstep	Cha-Cha-Cha	Jive	Foxtrot			
Cory & Rebecca	Cha-Cha-Cha	Quickstep	Jive	Foxtrot	Samba	Viennese Waltz	Waltz	Paso Doble					
Tina & Aaron	Cha-Cha-Cha	Quickstep	Jive	Paso Doble	Samba	Viennese Waltz							
Martin & Lauren	Waltz	Rumba	Tango	Paso Doble									
Peter & Hayley	Waltz	Rumba	Tango										
Geeling & Brian	Waltz	Rumba											

== Average chart ==
Rank by average	Competition finish	Couple	Total	Number of dances	Average
1	1	Temepara & Stefano	440	13	33.8
2	3	Miriama & Jonny	321	10	32.1
3	5	Tina & Aaron	179	6	29.8
4	2	Monty & Nerida	384	13	29.5
5	4	Cory & Rebecca	199	8	24.9
6	7	Peter & Hayley	65	6	21.7
7	6	Martin & Lauren	84	4	21.3
8	8	Geeling & Brian	40	2	20.0

== Weekly scores ==
Individual judges scores in the chart below (given in parentheses) are listed in this order from left to right: Brendan Cole, Alison Leonard, Craig Revel Horwood, Paul Mercurio.

=== Week 1: First Dances ===
Couples are listed in the order they performed.

Couple	Scores	Dance	Music
Cory & Rebecca	23 (6, 6, 5, 6)	Cha-cha-cha	" "—
Geeling & Brian	17 (4, 5, 3, 5)	Waltz	" "—
Monty & Nerida	23 (6, 7, 4, 6)	Cha-cha-cha	" "—
Martin & Lauren	21 (4, 6, 6, 5)	Waltz	" "—
Tina & Aaron	32 (7, 8, 9, 8)	Cha-cha-Cha	"Think"—Aretha Franklin
Peter & Hayley	34 (9, 8, 8, 9)	Waltz	"Moon River"—Henry Mancini
Temepara & Stefano	29 (7, 8, 8, 6)	Cha-cha-cha	" "—
Miriama & Jonny	35 (8, 9, 9, 9)	Waltz	" "—

=== Week 2 ===
Couples are listed in the order they performed.

Couple	Scores	Dance	Music	Result
Temepara & Stefano	31 (7, 8, 8, 8)	Quickstep	"Cabaret"—from Cabaret	Safe
Martin & Lauren	18 (5, 6, 3, 4)	Rumba	"Your Song"—Elton John	Safe
Tina & Aaron	29 (7, 8, 7, 7)	Quickstep	"Get Happy"—Judy Garland	Safe
Miriama & Jonny	28 (7, 7, 7, 7)	Rumba	"Endless Love"—Lionel Richie & Diana Ross	Safe
Cory & Rebecca	27 (7, 8, 5, 7)	Quickstep	"Brown Derby Jump"—Cherry Poppin' Daddies	Safe
Geeling & Brian	23 (6, 7, 4, 6)	Rumba	"Too Lost in You"—Sugababes	Eliminated
Monty & Nerida	23 (5, 6, 5, 7)	Quickstep	"Suddenly I See"—KT Tunstall	Safe
Peter & Hayley	14 (3, 5, 3, 3)	Rumba	"Careless Whisper"—George Michael	Bottom two

=== Week 3 ===
Couples are listed in the order they performed.

- Musical guests: Delta Goodrem

Couple	Scores	Dance	Music	Result
Monty & Nerida	26 (7, 7, 5, 7)	Jive	"Bad, Bad Leroy Brown"—Frank Sinatra	Safe
Peter Ulrich	17 (4, 6, 3, 4)	Tango	"Gold"—Spandau Ballet	Eliminated
Temepara & Stefano	33 (8, 9, 8, 8)	Jive	"Mambo No. 5"—Lou Bega	Safe
Martin & Lauren	28 (7, 7, 6, 8)	Tango	"Ecstasy"—Joe Loss	Safe
Tina & Aaron	31 (5, 8, 9, 9)	Jive	"Good Times"—INXS & Jimmy Barnes	Bottom two
Miriama & Jonny	36 (9, 8, 9, 10)	Tango	"El Choclo"—Stanley Black	Safe
Cory & Rebecca	20 (5, 6, 3, 6)	Jive	"I'm a Believer"—The Monkees	Safe

=== Week 4 ===
Couples are listed in the order they performed.

- Musical guests: Will Martin

Couple	Scores	Dance	Music	Result
Miriama & Jonny	32 (7, 8, 8, 9)	Paso Doble	"Bring Me to Life"—Evanescence	Safe
Cory & Rebecca	29 (7, 7, 7, 8)	Foxtrot	"My Guy"—Mary Wells	Safe
Tina & Aaron	34 (9, 9, 9, 7)	Paso Doble	"Free Your Mind"—En Vogue	Safe
Monty & Nerida	29 (7, 8, 6, 8)	Foxtrot	"Ain't That a Kick in the Head?"—Robbie Williams	Bottom two
Martin & Lauren	18 (4, 5, 3, 6)	Paso Doble	"Gimme! Gimme! Gimme! (A Man After Midnight)"—ABBA	Eliminated
Temepara & Stefano	34 (8, 9, 9, 8)	Foxtrot	"Walkin' My Baby Back Home"—Nat King Cole	Safe

=== Week 5 ===
Couples are listed in the order they performed.

- Musical guests: Lizzie Marvelly

Couple	Scores	Dance	Music	Result
Tina & Aaron	24 (5, 6, 6, 7)	Samba	"La Isla Bonita"—Madonna	Eliminated
Tina & Aaron	29 (7, 7, 8, 7)	Viennese Waltz	" "—	Eliminated
Temepara & Stefano	34 (8, 10, 8, 8)	Samba	"Brazil"—Edmundo Ros	Safe
Temepara & Stefano	33 (8, 8, 9, 8)	Viennese Waltz	" "—	Safe
Cory & Rebecca	21 (6, 6, 4, 5)	Samba	"Young Hearts Run Free"—Candi Staton	Bottom two
Cory & Rebecca	27 (6, 7, 7, 7)	Viennese Waltz	" "—	Bottom two
Miriama & Jonny	37 (8, 10, 9, 10)	Samba	"Livin' la Vida Loca"—Ricky Martin	Safe
Miriama & Jonny	31 (8, 9, 7, 7)	Viennese Waltz	" "—	Safe
Monty & Nerida	30 (7, 8, 6, 9)	Samba	"Quando quando quando"—Engelbert Humperdinck	Safe
Monty & Nerida	25 (6, 7, 5, 7)	Viennese Waltz	" "—	Safe

=== Week 6 ===
Couples are listed in the order they performed.

- Musical guests:

Couple	Scores	Dance	Music	Result
Monty & Nerida	29 (7, 8, 6, 8)	Waltz	"Gymnopedie"—Carl Doy	Safe
Monty & Nerida	27 (8, 8, 3, 8)	Rumba	"Sway"—Bic Runga	Safe
Miriama & Jonny	33 (8, 8, 8, 9)	Quickstep	"I'm Sitting on Top of the World"— Bobby Darin	Bottom two
Miriama & Jonny	21 (4, 6, 5, 6)	Cha-Cha-Cha	"Pink Cadillac"—Natalie Cole	Bottom two
Temepara & Stefano	34 (8, 9, 7, 10)	Tango	"Hernando's Hideaway"—Doris Day	Safe
Temepara & Stefano	30 (7, 8, 8, 7)	Rumba	"Sacrifice"—Elton John	Safe
Cory & Rebecca	25 (6, 7, 5, 7)	Waltz	"Dancing Like Lovers"—Ross Mitchell	Eliminated
Cory & Rebecca	27 (7, 8, 5, 7)	Paso Doble	"Live and Let Die"—Guns N' Roses	Eliminated

=== Week 7 ===
Couples are listed in the order they performed.

- Musical guests:

Couple	Scores	Dance	Music	Result
Temepara & Stefano	34 (8, 9, 9, 8)	Paso Doble	"Consuela"—Orquesta Tarde de Torros	Safe
Temepara & Stefano	36 (9, 9, 9, 9)	Waltz	"Until It's Time for You to Go"—Buffy Sainte-Marie	Safe
Miriama & Jonny	33 (8, 9, 8, 8)	Jive	"Johnny B. Goode"—Chuck Berry	Eliminated
Miriama & Jonny	35 (8, 9, 9, 9)	Foxtrot	"Broadway Baby"—from Follies	Eliminated
Monty & Nerida	35 (8, 9, 8, 10)	Paso Doble	"Boléro"—Maurice Ravel	Bottom two
Monty & Nerida	29 (7, 8, 6, 8)	Tango	"Hey Sexy Lady"—Shaggy	Bottom two

=== Week 8 ===
Couples are listed in the order they performed.

- Musical guests:

Couple	Scores	Dance	Music	Result
Monty & Nerida	33 (8, 9, 7, 9)	Quickstep	"Things"—Robbie Williams	Runners-up
Monty & Nerida	38 (9, 10, 9, 10)	Paso Doble	"Boléro"—Maurice Ravel	Runners-up
Monty & Nerida	37 (9, 9, 9, 10)	Freestyle	"Magalenha"—Sérgio Mendes	Runners-up
Temepara & Stefano	37 (9, 10, 9, 9)	Foxtrot	"Fly Me to the Moon"—Frank Sinatra	Winners
Temepara & Stefano	36 (8, 10, 9, 9)	Samba	"Brazil"—Edmundo Ros	Winners
Temepara & Stefano	39 (9, 10, 10, 10)	Freestyle	"I Am What I Am"—Gloria Gaynor	Winners
