= Dancing with the Stars (New Zealand TV series) series 9 =

Dancing with the Stars
- Season 9
- Celebrity winner: Jazz Thornton
- Professional winner: Brad Coleman

Release
- Original network: Three
- Original release: 24 April – 29 May 2022

Series chronology
- ← Previous; Season 8

The ninth (and final) series of Dancing with the Stars premiered on 24 April 2022 on Three.

== Cast ==
The series was hosted by Clint Randell and Sharyn Casey. Camilla Sacre-Dallerup was set to return to the judging panel as head judge, while James Luck and Lance Savali joined the judging panel for their first series. Sacre-Dallerup contracted Covid-19 and was replaced in the final programme by Karen Hardy.

=== Couples ===
The full cast was announced on 3 April. It was also announced that Eli Matthewson and Jonny Williams would make history by being the first same-sex partnership of the series.

Celebrity	Notability	Professional partner	Status
Sonia Gray	Actress & television presenter	Aaron Gilmore	Eliminated 1st on 25 April 2022
Eli Matthewson	The Edge radio presenter & comedian	Jonny Williams	Eliminated 2nd on 2 May 2022
Eric Murray	Former Olympic rower	Loryn Reynolds	Withdrew on 18 May 2022
Rhys Mathewson	Comedian	Phoebe Robb	Withdrew on 19 May 2022
Kerre Woodham	Television & radio presenter	Jared Neame	Eliminated 3rd on 23 May 2022
Alex Vaz	Reality television star	Brittany Coleman	Fourth Place on 29 May 2022
David Letele	Former professional boxer	Kristie Williams	Third Place on 29 May 2022
Brodie Kane	Television & radio presenter	Enrique Jones	Runners-up on 29 May 2022
Jazz Thornton	Author & mental health activist	Brad Coleman	Winners on 29 May 2022

== Production ==
In December 2019, it was that announced that a ninth series would air on Three in 2020. On 11 February 2020, it was announced that former contestant Laura Daniel would be replacing Rachel White on the judging panel for the ninth series. On 23 February 2020, The New Zealand Herald reported that Destiny Church Pastor and Vision NZ leader Hannah Tamaki was tipped to join the series. After major backlash online, MediaWorks confirmed that Tamaki would no longer be joining the series. In the same statement, they confirmed that the cast announcement for the ninth series was scheduled for the end of March 2020. However, due to the COVID-19 pandemic in New Zealand, the series was postponed indefinitely. In March 2022 it was confirmed that the show would return later that year, for what would end up being its final series.

== Scorecard ==
Couple	Place	1	2	3	4	5	6	
Couple	Place	1	2	3	4	5	Top 4	Top 2
Jazz & Brad	1	22+8=30	27+8=35	29+6=35	23+27=50	26+27=53	30	+28=58
Brodie & Enrique	2	20+6=26	17+7=24	24+7=31	23+24=47	26+27=53	29	+30=59
David & Kristie	3	20+6=26	16+7=23	21+1=22	18+22=40	22+24=46	26	
Vaz & Brittany	4	15+6=21	19+8=27	21+3=24	22+21=43	23+16=39	26	
Kerre & Jared	5	19+7=26	19+7=26	19+2=21		22+23=45		
Rhys & Phoebe	6	19+8=27	25+8=33	25+5=30	26+28=54	—		
Eric & Loryn	7	23+6=29	19+8=27	23+4=27	19+21=40	—		
Eli & Jonny	8	25+7=32	22+7=29					
Sonia & Aaron	9	20+6=26						

Red numbers indicate the couples with the lowest score for each week.
Green numbers indicate the couples with the highest score for each week.
indicates the couples eliminated that week.
indicates the returning couple that finished in the bottom two.
the returning couple that was the last to be called safe.
the couple withdrew from the competition.
the couple were eliminated but later returned to the competition.
indicates the winning couple.
indicates the runner-up couple.
indicates the couple who placed third.
indicates the couple who placed fourth.

== Average score chart ==
This table only counts for dances scored on a 30-point scale.

Rank by average	Place	Couple	Total points	Number of dances	Average
1	1	Jazz & Brad	239	9	26.6
2	6	Rhys & Phoebe	123	5	24.6
3	2	Brodie & Enrique	220	9	24.4
4	8	Eli & Jonny	47	2	23.5
5	3	David & Kristie	169	8	21.1
6	7	Eric & Loryn	105	5	21.0
7	4	Vaz & Brittany	163	8	20.4
7	5	Kerre & Jared	102	5	20.4
9	9	Sonia & Aaron	20	1	20.0

== Highest and lowest scoring performances ==
The best and worst performances in each dance according to the judges' 30-point scale are as follows:

Dance	Highest scored dancer(s)	Highest score	Lowest scored dancer(s)	Lowest score
Cha-Cha-Cha	Jazz Thornton	26	Eric Murray	19
Jive	Eli Matthewson	22	Rhys Mathewson; Eric Murray	19
Tango	Jazz Thornton	27	Alex Vaz	15
Samba	Brodie Kane	27	Kerre Woodham	19
Quickstep	Jazz Thornton	28	David Letele	18
Rumba	Eric Murray; Kerre Woodham	23	Alex Vaz	19
Foxtrot	Jazz Thornton	29	David Letele; Alex Vaz	16
Paso Doble	Brodie Kane	30	Kerre Woodham	19
Viennese Waltz	Jazz Thornton	27	David Letele	21
Waltz	Rhys Mathewson	25		
Showdance	Jazz Thornton	30	David Letele; Alex Vaz	26

=== Couples' highest and lowest scoring dances ===
Scores are based upon a potential 30-point maximum (team dances are excluded).

Couples	Highest scoring dance(s)	Lowest scoring dance(s)
Jazz & Brad	Showdance (30)	Samba (22)
Brodie & Enrique	Paso Doble (30)	Foxtrot (17)
David & Kristie	Showdance (26)	Foxtrot (16)
Vaz & Brittany	Showdance (26)	Tango (15)
Kerre & Jared	Rumba (23)	Foxtrot; Paso Doble; Samba (19)
Rhys & Phoebe	Foxtrot (28)	Jive (19)
Eric & Loryn	Quickstep; Rumba (23)	Cha-Cha-Cha; Jive (19)
Eli & Jonny	Viennese Waltz (25)	Jive (22)
Sonia & Aaron	Rumba (20)	Rumba (20)

== Weekly scores ==
Individual judges' scores in the charts below (given in parentheses) are listed in this order from left to right: James Luck, Camilla Sacre-Dallerup, Lance Savali.

=== Week 1: Anzac Day ===
Running order (Night 1)

Couple	Score	Dance	Music	Results
Rhys & Phoebe	19 (6, 6, 7)	Jive	"Are You Gonna Be My Girl" – Jet	Safe
Kerre & Jared	19 (7, 6, 6)	Foxtrot	"Glitter" – BENEE	Safe
Vaz & Brittany	15 (4, 6, 5)	Tango	"Youngblood" – 5 Seconds of Summer	Bottom two
Jazz & Brad	22 (8, 7, 7)	Samba	"Sundown" – Six60	Safe
David & Kristie	20 (7, 7, 6)	Paso Doble	"The Greatest" – Six60	Safe
Sonia & Aaron	20 (7, 7, 6)	Rumba	"Help Me Out" – Kings featuring Sons of Zion	Eliminated
Eli & Jonny	25 (9, 8, 8)	Viennese Waltz	"Never Be Apart" – TEEKS	Safe

Running order (Night 2)

Couple	Score	Dance	Music	Results
Eric & Loryn	23 (8, 8, 7)	Quickstep	"Dance Monkey" – Tones and I	Safe
Brodie & Enrique	20 (6, 7, 7)	Jive	"Can't Get You Out of My Head" – Kylie Minogue	Safe
Eli & Jonny; Vaz & Brittany; Kerre & Jared; Eric & Loryn	7; 6; 7; 6	Team Cha-Cha-Cha		
Sonia & Aaron; David & Kristie; Jazz & Brad; Rhys & Phoebe; Brodie & Enrique	6; 6; 8; 8; 6	Team Waltz		

=== Week 2: Top 40 ===
Running order (Night 1)

Couple	Score	Dance	Music	Results
Eric & Loryn	19 (6, 6, 7)	Cha-Cha-Cha	"Intoxicated" – Martin Solveig and Good Times Ahead	Safe
Rhys & Phoebe	25 (9, 8, 8)	Tango	"Shivers" – Ed Sheeran	Safe
Brodie & Enrique	17 (5, 6, 6)	Foxtrot	"Good as Hell" – Lizzo	Safe
Vaz & Brittany	19 (7, 6, 6)	Rumba	"Heat Waves" – Glass Animals	Bottom Two
Eli & Jonny	22 (7, 8, 7)	Jive	"Thats What I Want" – Lil Nas X	Eliminated
Kerre & Jared	19 (6, 7, 6)	Paso Doble	"Crazy" – Drax Project	Safe

Running order (Night 2)

Couple	Score	Dance	Music	Results
David & Kristie	16 (5, 6, 5)	Foxtrot	"Come Back Home" – Stan Walker	Safe
Jazz & Brad	27 (10, 9, 8)	Quickstep	"Light Switch" – Charlie Puth	Safe
Eli & Jonny; Brodie & Enrique; Kerre & Jared; David & Kristie	7	Traditional Samba (Team Fire)	"Iko Iko" – The Belle Stars	
Eric & Loryn; Vaz & Brittany; Rhys & Phoebe; Jazz & Brad	8	Modern Samba (Team Ice)	"Levitating" – Dua Lipa	

=== Week 3: Mother's Day ===
Running order (Night 1)

Couple	Score	Dance	Music	Results
Kerre & Jared	19 (6, 7, 6)	Samba	"Africa" – Toto	Eliminated
Vaz & Brittany	21 (7, 7, 7)	Jive	"Volare" – Gipsy Kings	Bottom Two
Rhys & Phoebe	25 (8, 9, 8)	Waltz	"Three Times a Lady" – Commodores	Safe
Brodie & Enrique	24 (8, 8, 8)	Paso Doble	"Bohemian Rhapsody" – Queen	Safe
Eric & Loryn	23 (8, 8, 7)	Rumba	"Mothers Eyes" – Six60	Safe
Jazz & Brad	29 (10, 10, 9)	Foxtrot	"Rise Up" – Andra Day	Safe
David & Kristie	21 (7, 7, 7)	Viennese Waltz	"Count On Me" – Judah Kelly	Safe

Running order (Night 2)

Couple	Score	Dance	Music
Brodie & Enrique; Jazz & Brad; Rhys & Phoebe; Eric & Loryn; Vaz & Brittany; Kerre & Jared; David & Kristie	7; 6; 5; 4; 3; 2; 1	Jive Marathon	"Tutti Frutti" – Little Richard

Judge's vote to save

- Luck: Vaz & Brittany
- Savali: Kerre & Jared
- Sacre-Dallerup: Vaz & Brittany

=== Week 4: Club Night & My Jam ===
Running order

Couple	Score	Dance	Music	Results
Rhys & Phoebe	26 (9, 9, 8)	Samba		Safe
Rhys & Phoebe	28 (10, 9, 9)	Foxtrot	"Domino" – Jessie J	Safe
David & Kristie	18 (6, 6, 6)	Quickstep	"Call Me" – Blondie	Safe
David & Kristie	22 (7, 7, 8)	Jive	"Teardrops" – Womack & Womack	Safe
Vaz & Brittany	22 (8, 7, 7)	Cha-Cha-Cha	"Dreams"- Fleetwood Mac	Eliminated
Vaz & Brittany	21 (8, 6, 7)	Quickstep	"Riptide" – Vance Joy	Eliminated
Eric & Loryn	19 (6, 6, 7)	Jive	"Cooler than Me" – Mike Posner	Bottom two
Eric & Loryn	21 (7, 7, 7)	Tango	"Another One Bites the Dust" – Queen	Bottom two
Brodie & Enrique	23 (8, 8, 7)	Quickstep	"As It Was" – Harry Styles	Safe
Brodie & Enrique	24 (8, 8, 8)	Cha-Cha-Cha	"I'm Outta Love" – Anastacia	Safe
Jazz & Brad	23 (7, 8, 8)	Paso Doble	"Love Tonight" – Shouse	Safe
Jazz & Brad	27 (9, 9, 9)	Viennese Waltz	"Breakaway" – Kelly Clarkson	Safe

Judge's vote to save

- Luck: Vaz & Brittany
- Savali: Eric & Loryn
- Sacre-Dallerup: Eric & Loryn

=== Week 5: Semi-Finals ===
Eric & Loryn withdrew from the competition after Eric tested positive for COVID-19, Vaz & Brittany were brought back in.
Rhys & Phoebe withdrew from the competition after they both tested positive for COVID-19, Kerre & Jared were brought back in.

Running order

Couple	Score	Dance	Music	Results
Brodie & Enrique (Clint Randell)	26 (8, 9, 9)	Tango	"Shout" – The Isley Brothers	Safe
Brodie & Enrique (Clint Randell)	27 (9, 9, 9)	Samba	"Come On Eileen" – Dexys Midnight Runners	Safe
Vaz & Brittany (Siobhan Marshall)	23 (9, 7, 7)	Samba	"Coco Jamboo" – Mr. President	Bottom two
Vaz & Brittany (Siobhan Marshall)	16 (5, 6, 5)	Foxtrot	"Great Southern Land" – Icehouse	Bottom two
David & Kristie (Sonia Grey)	22 (7, 8, 7)	Tango	"What Is Love" – Haddaway	Safe
David & Kristie (Sonia Grey)	24 (8, 8, 8)	Cha-Cha-Cha	"September" – Earth, Wind & Fire	Safe
Jazz & Brad (Eli Matthewson)	26 (9, 9, 8)	Cha-Cha-Cha	"Just Dance" – Lady Gaga ft. Colby O'Donis	Safe
Jazz & Brad (Eli Matthewson)	27 (9, 9, 9)	Tango	"I Can't Wait" – Stevie Nicks	Safe
Kerre & Jared (Jonny Williams)	22 (8, 7, 7)	Quickstep	"You to Me Are Everything" – The Real Thing	Eliminated
Kerre & Jared (Jonny Williams)	23 (8, 7, 8)	Rumba	"Wicked Game" – Chris Isaak	Eliminated

Judge's vote to save

- Luck: Vaz & Brittany
- Savali: Vaz & Brittany
- Sacre-Dallerup: Did not vote, but would have voted to save Vaz & Brittany

=== Week 6: Final ===
Individual judges' scores in the charts below (given in parentheses) are listed in this order from left to right: James Luck, Karen Hardy, Lance Savali.
Camilla Sacre-Dallerup was absent after testing positive for COVID-19, Karen Hardy replaced her on the judges table.

Running order (Top 4)

Couple	Score	Dance	Music	Results
David & Kristie	26 (9, 8, 9)	Showdance	"I Believe" – Yolanda Adams	Third Place
Vaz & Brittany	26 (9, 9, 8)	Showdance	"Legendary" – Welshly Arms	Fourth Place
Jazz & Brad	30 (10, 10, 10)	Showdance	"Angel by the Wings" – Sia	Safe
Brodie & Enrique	29 (10, 10, 9)	Showdance	"Proud Mary" – Tina Turner	Safe

Running order (Top 2)

Couple	Score	Dance	Music	Results
Jazz & Brad	28 (10, 9, 9)	Quickstep	"Light Switch" – Charlie Puth	Winners
Brodie & Enrique	30 (10, 10, 10)	Paso Doble	"Bohemian Rhapsody" – Queen	Runners-up

== Dance chart ==
Highest scoring dance
Lowest scoring dance

Couple	1		2		3		4		5		6	
Jazz & Brad	Samba	Team Waltz	Quickstep	Team Ice	Foxtrot	Jive Marathon	Paso Doble	Viennese Waltz	Cha-Cha-Cha	Tango	Showdance	Quickstep
Brodie & Enrique	Jive	Team Waltz	Foxtrot	Team Fire	Paso Doble	Jive Marathon	Quickstep	Cha-Cha-Cha	Tango	Samba	Showdance	Paso Doble
David & Kristie	Paso Doble	Team Waltz	Foxtrot	Team Fire	Viennese Waltz	Jive Marathon	Quickstep	Jive	Tango	Cha-Cha-Cha	Showdance	
Vaz & Brittany	Tango	Team Cha-Cha-Cha	Rumba	Team Ice	Jive	Jive Marathon	Cha-Cha-Cha	Quickstep	Samba	Foxtrot	Showdance	
Kerre & Jared	Foxtrot	Team Cha-Cha-Cha	Paso Doble	Team Fire	Samba	Jive Marathon			Quickstep	Rumba		
Rhys & Phoebe	Jive	Team Waltz	Tango	Team Ice	Waltz	Jive Marathon	Samba	Foxtrot	—			
Eric & Loryn	Quickstep	Team Cha-Cha-Cha	Cha-Cha-Cha	Team Ice	Rumba	Jive Marathon	Jive	Tango	—			
Eli & Jonny	Viennese Waltz	Team Cha-Cha-Cha	Jive	Team Fire								
Sonia & Aaron	Rumba	Team Waltz										
