= Pongia =

Pongia is a surname. Notable people with the surname include:

- Brendon Pongia (born 1969), New Zealand basketball player and television presenter
- Quentin Pongia (1970–2019), New Zealand rugby league player
