= Dancing with the Stars (New Zealand TV series) series 5 =

Dancing with the Stars
- Season 5
- Celebrity winner: Tāmati Coffey
- Professional winner: Samantha Hitchcock
- No. of episodes: 9

Release
- Original network: TV One
- Original release: 3 March – 21 April 2009

Series chronology
- ← Previous; Season 4 Next → Season 6

The fifth series of Dancing with the Stars premiered on TV One on 3 March 2009. All four judges from series 4 returned. On its opening night, over 800,000 people tuned in to watch the first show premiere. Rebecca Hobbs is sister to Christopher Hobbs. John Rowles withdrew in week three for health reasons. This series had the closest final ever experienced on the New Zealand show.

== Contestants ==
Celebrity	Occupation	Professional Partner	Placing
Tāmati Coffey	Television presenter	Samantha Hitchcock	Winners on 21 April 2009
Barbara Kendall	Olympic windsurfer	Jonny Williams	Runners-up on 21 April 2009
Josh Kronfeld	Former rugby union player	Rachel Burstein	Eliminated 5th on 14 April 2009
Geraldine Brophy	Stage & screen actress	Stefano Olivieri	Eliminated 4th on 7 April 2009
Rebecca Hobbs	Shortland Street actress	Aaron Gilmore	Eliminated 3rd on 31 March 2009
Christopher Hobbs	Shortland Street actor	Kristie Boyd	Eliminated 2nd on 25 March 2009
John Rowles	Singer	Krystal Stuart	Withdrew on 16 March 2009
Lizzy Igasan	Olympic field hockey captain	Cody Stephens	Eliminated 1st on 10 March 2009

== Scorecard ==
Red numbers indicate the couples with the lowest score for each week.
Green numbers indicate the couples with the highest score for each week.
indicates the couples eliminated that week.
indicates a couple withdrew that week.
indicates the returning couple that finished in the bottom two.
indicates the winning couple.
indicates the runner-up couple.

Team	Place	1	2	1+2	3	4	5	6	7	8
Tāmati & Samantha	1	25	36	61	35	36	28+32=60	23+27=50	37+37=74	38+40+35=113
Barbara & Jonny	2	19	32	51	36	32	31+33=64	35+32=67	34+37=71	38+39+40=117
Josh & Rachel	3	20	24	44	25	27	22+26=48	31+25=56	24+31=55	
Geraldine & Stefano	4	27	15	42	27	24	27+28=55	18+20=38		
Rebecca & Aaron	5	29	30	59	29	36	28+30=58			
Chris & Kristie	6	9	18	27	26	21				
John & Krystal	7	14	19	33	-					
Lizzy & Cody	8	20	21	41						

== Dance Chart ==
Highest Scoring Dance
Lowest Scoring Dance

Team	1	2	3	4	5		6		7		8		
Tāmati & Samantha	Waltz	Paso Doble	Quickstep	Tango	Samba	American Smooth	Cha-Cha-Cha	Foxtrot	Jive	Rumba	Waltz	Paso Doble	Freestyle
Barbara & Jonny	Waltz	Paso Doble	Quickstep	Jive	Samba	American Smooth	Tango	Cha-Cha-Cha	Rumba	Foxtrot	Rumba	Quickstep	Freestyle
Josh & Rachel	Waltz	Paso Doble	Quickstep	Jive	Samba	American Smooth	Rumba	Foxtrot	Cha-Cha-Cha	Tango			
Geraldine & Stefano	Waltz	Paso Doble	Quickstep	Jive	Samba	American Smooth	Tango	Rumba					
Rebecca & Aaron	Cha-Cha-Cha	Foxtrot	Rumba	Tango	Samba	American Smooth							
Chris & Kristie	Cha-Cha-Cha	Foxtrot	Rumba	Tango									
John & Krystal	Cha-Cha-Cha	Foxtrot	Withdrew										
Lizzy & Cody	Cha-Cha-Cha	Foxtrot											

== Average chart ==
Rank by average	Competition finish	Couple	Total	Number of dances	Average
1	2	Barbara & Jonny	438	13	33.7
2	1	Tāmati & Samantha	429	13	33.0
3	5	Rebecca & Aaron	182	6	30.3
4	3	Josh & Rachel	255	10	25.5
5	4	Geraldine & Stefano	186	8	23.3
6	8	Lizzy & Cody	41	2	20.5
7	6	Chris & Kristie	74	4	18.5
8	7	John & Krystal	33	2	16.5

== Weekly scores ==
Individual judges scores in the chart below (given in parentheses) are listed in this order from left to right: Brendan Cole, Alison Leonard, Craig Revel Horwood, Paul Mercurio.

=== Week 1: First Dances ===
Couples are listed in the order they performed.

Couple	Scores	Dance	Music
Barbara & Jonny	19 (5, 5, 4, 5)	Waltz	"See the Day"—Girls Aloud
Chris & Kristie	9 (2, 3, 2, 2)	Cha-cha-cha	"Conchita"—Lou Bega
Geraldine & Stefano	27 (7, 7, 6, 7)	Waltz	"Rainbow Connection"—Sarah McLachlan
Lizzy & Cody	20 (4, 6, 5, 5)	Cha-cha-cha	"Let's Groove"—Earth, Wind & Fire
Tāmati & Samantha	25 (7, 7, 4, 7)	Waltz	"My Way"—Tony Evans
Rebecca & Aaron	29 (7, 7, 8, 7)	Cha-cha-cha	"No More Tears (Enough Is Enough)"—Barbra Streisand & Donna Summer
Josh & Rachel	20 (4, 5, 5, 6)	Waltz	"Love Theme from Romeo and Juliet"—Henry Mancini
John & Krystal	14 (3, 6, 2, 3)	Cha-cha-cha	"Smooth"—Santana

=== Week 2 ===
Couples are listed in the order they performed.

Couple	Scores	Dance	Music	Result
Josh & Rachel	24 (7, 7, 4, 6)	Paso Doble	"The Final Countdown"—Europe	Safe
John & Krystal	19 (3, 6, 5, 5)	Foxtrot	"I've Got the World on a String"—Frank Sinatra	Safe
Barbara & Jonny	32 (8, 8, 8, 8)	Paso Doble	"Will and Elizabeth"—from Pirates of the Caribbean: The Curse of the Black Pearl	Safe
Chris & Kristie	18 (3, 6, 3, 6)	Foxtrot	"Feeling Good"—Michael Bublé	Bottom two
Geraldine & Stefano	12 (3, 5, 4, 3)	Paso Doble	"Gallito"—Merle Evans Circus Band	Safe
Lizzy & Cody	21 (3, 6, 6, 6)	Foxtrot	"Isn't She Lovely"—Stevie Wonder	Eliminated
Tāmati & Samantha	36 (9, 9, 9, 9)	Paso Doble	"The Plaza of Execution"—from The Mask of Zorro	Safe
Rebecca & Aaron	30 (7, 7, 8, 8)	Foxtrot	"(They Long to Be) Close to You"—The Carpenters	Safe

=== Week 3 ===
Couples are listed in the order they performed.

Couple	Scores	Dance	Music
Geraldine & Stefano	27 (6, 7, 7, 7)	Quickstep	"The Lady Is a Tramp"—Frank Sinatra
Rebecca & Aaron	29 (7, 7, 8, 7)	Rumba	"Bleeding Love"—Leona Lewis
Tāmati & Samantha	35 (8, 9, 9, 9)	Quickstep	"These Boots Are Made for Walkin'"—Nancy Sinatra
Barbara & Jonny	36 (9, 9, 9, 9)	Quickstep	"You're the One That I Want"—John Travolta & Olivia Newton-John
Chris & Kristie	26 (8, 7, 3, 8)	Rumba	"Wonderful Tonight"—Eric Clapton
Josh & Rachel	25 (6, 7, 5, 7)	Quickstep	"Mr Pinstripe Suit"—Big Bad Voodoo Daddy

=== Week 4 ===
Couples are listed in the order they performed.

Couple	Scores	Dance	Music	Result
Chris & Kristie	21 (5, 6, 4, 6)	Tango	"Money, Money, Money"—ABBA	Eliminated
Barbara & Jonny	32 (7, 8, 9, 8)	Jive	"I Got You (I Feel Good)"—James Brown	Safe
Tāmati & Samantha	36 (9, 10, 8, 9)	Tango	"Disturbia"—Rihanna	Safe
Josh & Rachel	27 (6, 8, 5, 8)	Jive	"Great Balls of Fire"—Jerry Lee Lewis	Safe
Rebecca & Aaron	36 (8, 9, 9, 10)	Tango	"Tanguera"—Sexteto Mayor	Safe
Geraldine & Stefano	24 (6, 7, 6, 5)	Jive	"The Boy from New York City"—The Manhattan Transfer	Bottom two

=== Week 5 ===
Couples are listed in the order they performed.

Couple	Scores	Dance	Music	Result
Rebecca & Aaron	28 (7, 7, 7, 7)	Samba	"Help Yourself"—Tom Jones	Eliminated
Rebecca & Aaron	30 (8, 8, 6, 8)	American Smooth	"Breakaway"—Kelly Clarkson	Eliminated
Tāmati & Samantha	28 (7, 7, 7, 7)	Samba	"Hips Don't Lie"—Shakira	Safe
Tāmati & Samantha	32 (8, 8, 8, 8)	American Smooth	"Breakaway"—Kelly Clarkson	Safe
Geraldine & Stefano	27 (7, 7, 7, 6)	Samba	"A-Tisket, A-Tasket"—Ella Fitzgerald	Safe
Geraldine & Stefano	28 (8, 8, 5, 7)	American Smooth	"Breakaway"—Kelly Clarkson	Safe
Josh & Rachel	22 (6, 7, 4, 5)	Samba	"Jump in the Line (Shake, Senora)"—Harry Belafonte	Bottom two
Josh & Rachel	26 (7, 7, 6, 6)	American Smooth	"Breakaway"—Kelly Clarkson	Bottom two
Barbara & Jonny	31 (8, 6, 9, 8)	Samba	"I Don't Feel Like Dancin'"—Scissor Sisters	Safe
Barbara & Jonny	33 (7, 8, 9, 9)	American Smooth	"Breakaway"—Kelly Clarkson	Safe

=== Week 6 ===
Couples are listed in the order they performed.

Couple	Scores	Dance	Music	Result
Tāmati & Samantha	23 (5, 6, 6, 6)	Cha-Cha-Cha	"Mercy"—Duffy	Safe
Tāmati & Samantha	27 (7, 7, 6, 7)	Foxtrot	"The Pink Panther Theme"—Henry Mancini	Safe
Barbara & Jonny	35 (8, 9, 9, 9)	Tango	"Perhaps, Perhaps, Perhaps"—Doris Day	Bottom two
Barbara & Jonny	32 (7, 8, 9, 8)	Cha-Cha-Cha	"Shake Your Groove Thing"—Peaches & Herb	Bottom two
Josh & Rachel	31 (8, 8, 7, 8)	Rumba	"Let's Get It On"—Marvin Gaye	Safe
Josh & Rachel	25 (6, 6, 6, 7)	Foxtrot	"Mellow Yellow"—Donovan	Safe
Geraldine & Stefano	18 (4, 5, 4, 5)	Tango	"Libertango"—Bond	Eliminated
Geraldine & Stefano	20 (5, 6, 4, 5)	Rumba	"Big Girls Don't Cry"—Fergie	Eliminated

=== Week 7 ===
Couples are listed in the order they performed.

Couple	Scores	Dance	Music	Result
Barbara & Jonny	34 (8, 9, 9, 8)	Rumba	"You Give Me Something"—James Morrison	Safe
Barbara & Jonny	37 (9, 10, 9, 9)	Foxtrot	"Bubbly"—Colbie Caillat	Safe
Josh & Rachel	24 (7, 6, 5, 6)	Cha-Cha-Cha	"Billie Jean"—Michael Jackson	Eliminated
Josh & Rachel	31 (9, 8, 6, 8)	Tango	"Mujer"—Carlos Ortega	Eliminated
Tāmati & Samantha	37 (9, 9, 9, 10)	Jive	"You Can't Stop the Beat"— from Hairspray	Bottom two
Tāmati & Samantha	37 (9, 9, 10, 9)	Rumba	"Irreplaceable"—Beyoncé	Bottom two

=== Week 8 ===
Couples are listed in the order they performed.

Couple	Scores	Dance	Music	Result
Tāmati & Samantha	38 (9, 10, 9, 10)	Waltz	"What'll I Do"—Des O'Connor	Winners
Tāmati & Samantha	40 (10, 10, 10, 10)	Paso Doble	"The Plaza of Execution"—from The Mask of Zorro	Winners
Tāmati & Samantha	35 (8, 9, 9, 9)	Freestyle	"Maori Battalion" / "Boogie Woogie Bugle Boy"—Bette Midler	Winners
Barbara & Jonny	38 (9, 10, 9, 10)	Rumba	"The Way We Were"—Barbra Streisand	Runners-up
Barbara & Jonny	39 (10, 10, 9, 10)	Quickstep	"You're the One That I Want"—John Travolta & Olivia Newton-John	Runners-up
Barbara & Jonny	40 (10, 10, 10, 10)	Freestyle	"Don't Stop Me Now"—Queen	Runners-up
