= Dancing with the Stars (New Zealand TV series) series 6 =

2015 season of New Zealand TV series

Dancing with the Stars
- Season 6
- Celebrity winner: Simon Barnett
- Professional winner: Vanessa Cole

Release
- Original network: TV3
- Original release: 31 May – 19 July 2015

Series chronology
- ← Previous; Season 5 Next → Season 7

The sixth series of Dancing with the Stars premiered on 31 May 2015 on TV3, and was hosted by Dominic Bowden and Sharyn Casey. Stefano Olivieri, Hayley Holt, and Candy Lane were the series' judges; Lane served as the head judge.

== Cast ==
=== Couples ===
Celebrity	Notability	Professional partner	Status
Maz Quinn	Professional surfer	Caryn Lin	Eliminated 1st on June 8, 2015
Colin Mathura-Jeffree	Model & television presenter	Kristie Williams	Eliminated 2nd on June 15, 2015
Pam Corkery	Former politician & broadcaster	Matt Tatton-Brown	Eliminated 3rd on June 22, 2015
Teuila Blakely	Former Shortland Street actress	Scott Cole	Eliminated 4th on June 29, 2015
Ben Barrington	The Almighty Johnsons actor	Krystal Stuart	Eliminated 5th on July 6, 2015
Shane Cameron	Professional boxer	Nerida Cortese	Eliminated 6th on July 6, 2015
Jay-Jay Harvey	The Edge radio presenter	Enrique Johns	Eliminated 7th on July 13, 2015
Siobhan Marshall	Television actress & singer	Charlie Billington	Third Place on July 19, 2015
Chrystal Chenery	The Bachelor New Zealand contestant	Jonny Williams	Runners-up on July 19, 2015
Simon Barnett	Television & radio broadcaster	Vanessa Cole	Winners on July 19, 2015

== Scorecard ==
Team	Place	1	2	1+2	3	4	5	6	7	8
Simon & Vanessa	1	12	24	36	24	27	28	28	26+29=55	27+30+57
Chrystal & Jonny	2	19	19	38	22	25	27	29	27+30=57	27+28=55
Siobhan & Charlie	3	21	24	45	24	25	24	28	23+27=50	26+30=56
Jay-Jay & Enrique	4	20	15	35	18	21	19	23	24+20=44	
Shane & Nerida	5	13	19	32	20	21	23	23		
Ben & Krystal	6	18	13	31	15	14	22	20		
Teuila & Scott	7	17	21	38	25	13	18			
Pam & Matt	8	11	14	25	12	17				
Colin & Kristie	9	19	21	40	19					
Maz & Caryn	10	15	13	28						

Red numbers indicate the couples with the lowest score for each week.
Green numbers indicate the couples with the highest score for each week.
indicates the couples eliminated that week.
indicates the returning couple that finished in the bottom two.
indicates the winning couple.
indicates the runner-up couple.
indicates the couple who placed third.

=== Average score chart ===
This table only counts for dances scored on a 30-point scale.

Rank by average	Place	Couple	Total points	Number of dances	Average
1	1	Simon & Vanessa	255	10	25.5
2	2	Chrystal & Jonny	253	10	25.3
3	3	Siobhan & Charlie	252	10	25.2
4	4	Jay-Jay & Enrique	160	8	20.0
5	5	Shane & Nerida	119	6	19.8
6	9	Colin & Kristie	59	3	19.7
7	7	Teuila & Scott	94	5	18.8
8	6	Ben & Krystal	102	6	17.0
9	10	Maz & Caryn	28	2	14.0
10	8	Pam & Matt	54	4	13.5

=== Highest and lowest scoring performances ===
The best and worst performances in each dance according to the judges' 30-point scale are as follows:

Dance	Highest scored dancer(s)	Highest score	Lowest scored dancer(s)	Lowest score
Cha-cha-cha	Chrystal Chenery	29	Simon Barnett	12
Jive	Chrystal Chenery	28	Teuila Blakely	17
Foxtrot	Simon Barnett	27	Pam Corkery	11
Samba	Simon Barnett	28	Pam Corkery	12
Quickstep	Chrystal Chenery	27	Jay-Jay Harvey	15
Rumba	Siobhan Marshall	30	Pam Corkery; Ben Barrington	14
Tango	Simon Barnett; Siobhan Marshall	24	Pam Corkery	17
Waltz	Siobhan Marshall	25	Chrystal Chenery; Shane Cameron	19
Paso doble	Simon Barnett	30	Teuila Blakely	18
Viennese waltz	Simon Barnett	27	Ben Barrington	22
Argentine tango	Shane Cameron	23		
Salsa	Siobhan Marshall	28		
Freestyle	Chrystal Chenery	30	Jay-Jay Harvey	20

=== Couples' highest and lowest scoring dances ===
Scores are based upon a potential 30-point maximum.

Couples	Highest scoring dance(s)	Lowest scoring dance(s)
Simon & Vanessa	Paso doble (30)	Cha-cha-cha (12)
Chrystal & Jonny	Freestyle (30)	Jive & Waltz (19)
Siobhan & Charlie	Rumba (30)	Cha-cha-cha (21)
Jay-Jay & Enrique	Viennese waltz (24)	Quickstep (15)
Shane & Nerida	Argentine tango & Samba (23)	Cha-cha-cha (13)
Ben & Krystal	Viennese waltz (22)	Samba (13)
Teuila & Scott	Rumba (25)	Cha-cha-cha (13)
Pam & Matt	Tango (17)	Foxtrot (11)
Colin & Kristie	Foxtrot (21)	Jive & Cha-cha-cha (19)
Maz & Caryn	Foxtrot (15)	Cha-cha-cha (13)

== Weekly scores ==
Individual judges' scores in the charts below (given in parentheses) are listed in this order from left to right: Stefano Olivieri, Candy Lane, Hayley Holt.

=== Week 1 ===
Couples performed the cha-cha-cha, foxtrot or jive.

Running order

Couple	Score	Dance	Music
Teuila & Scott	17 (5, 6, 6)	Jive	"Happy"—Pharrell Williams
Simon & Vanessa	12 (4, 4, 4)	Cha-cha-cha	"Rock DJ"—Robbie Williams
Ben & Krystal	18 (6, 6, 6)	Foxtrot	"Fever"—Peggy Lee
Jay-Jay & Enrique	20 (6, 7, 7)	Jive	"Candyman"—Christina Aguilera
Shane & Nerida	13 (4, 4, 5)	Cha-cha-cha	"When Love Comes To Town"—U2 feat. B.B. King
Colin & Kristie	19 (6, 7, 6)	Jive	"Wake Me Up Before You Go-Go"—Wham!
Pam & Matt	11 (4, 3, 4)	Foxtrot	"Big Spender"—Shirley Bassey
Siobhan & Charlie	21 (7, 7, 7)	Cha-cha-cha	"Uptown Girl"—Billy Joel
Maz & Caryn	15 (5, 5, 5)	Foxtrot	"Wade in the Water"—Eva Cassidy
Chrystal & Jonny	19 (6, 6, 7)	Jive	"Shake it Off"—Taylor Swift

=== Week 2 ===
Running order

Couple	Score	Dance	Music	Result
Jay-Jay & Enrique	15 (5, 4, 6)	Quickstep	"Walking On Sunshine"—Katrina & The Waves	Safe
Chrystal & Jonny	19 (6, 6, 7)	Waltz	"Skyfall"—Adele	Safe
Ben & Krystal	13 (5, 4, 4)	Samba	"Livin' La Vida Loca"—Ricky Martin	Bottom two
Shane & Nerida	19 (6, 6, 7)	Waltz	"If You Don't Know Me By Now"—Harold Melvin & The Blue Notes	Safe
Colin & Kristie	21 (7, 7, 7)	Foxtrot	"All About That Bass"—Meghan Trainor	Safe
Maz & Caryn	13 (5, 4, 4)	Cha-cha-cha	"Uptown Funk"—Mark Ronson feat. Bruno Mars	Eliminated
Siobhan & Charlie	24 (8, 8, 8)	Tango	"Without You"—David Guetta feat. Usher	Safe
Pam & Matt	14 (5, 4, 5)	Rumba	"Wonderful Tonight"—Eric Clapton	Safe
Teuila & Scott	21 (7, 7, 7)	Foxtrot	"It Had To Be You"—Frank Sinatra	Safe
Simon & Vanessa	24 (8, 8, 8)	Tango	"Viva La Vida"—Coldplay	Safe

=== Week 3: Latin Night ===
Couples performed Latin-themed dances.

Running order

Couple	Score	Dance	Music	Result
Siobhan & Charlie	24 (8, 8, 8)	Samba	"Lean On"—Major Lazer feat. MØ & DJ Snake	Safe
Shane & Nerida	20 (7, 6, 7)	Jive	"Land Of A Thousand Dances"—Wilson Pickett	Safe
Simon & Vanessa	24 (8, 8, 8)	Rumba	"How Will I Know"—Sam Smith	Safe
Chrystal & Jonny	22 (7, 7, 8)	Paso doble	"Up"—Olly Murs & Demi Lovato	Bottom two
Colin & Kristie	19 (6, 6, 7)	Cha-cha-cha	"Troublemaker"—Olly Murs feat. Flo Rida	Eliminated
Pam & Matt	12 (4, 4, 4)	Samba	"Hey Baby"—No Doubt	Safe
Teuila & Scott	25 (9, 8, 8)	Rumba	"Thinking Out Loud"—Ed Sheeran	Safe
Ben & Krystal	15 (5, 5, 5)	Cha-cha-cha	"Party Rock Anthem"—LMFAO	Safe
Jay-Jay & Enrique	18 (6, 6, 6)	Rumba	"All of Me"—John Legend	Safe

=== Week 4: Winter Wonderland Night ===
Couples performed in a Winter Wonderland special.

Running order

Couple	Score	Dance	Music	Result
Simon & Vanessa	27 (9, 9, 9)	Foxtrot	"Baby, It's Cold Outside"—Ricardo Montalbán & Esther Williams	Safe
Shane & Nerida	21 (7, 7, 7)	Quickstep	"Umbrella"—Rihanna	Safe
Pam & Matt	17 (6, 6, 5)	Tango	"Here Comes The Rain Again"—Eurythmics	Eliminated
Siobhan & Charlie	25 (8, 9, 8)	Waltz	"Let It Go"—from Frozen	Bottom two
Ben & Krystal	14 (5, 5, 4)	Rumba	"Jar of Hearts"—Christina Perri	Safe
Jay-Jay & Enrique	21 (7, 7, 7)	Tango	"Set Fire to the Rain"—Adele	Safe
Chrystal & Jonny	25 (8, 9, 8)	Viennese waltz	"Kiss from a Rose"—Seal	Safe
Teuila & Scott	13 (4, 4, 5)	Cha-cha-cha	"Ice, Ice Baby"—Vanilla Ice	Safe

=== Week 5: Movie Night ===
Couples performed to movie classics.

Running order

Couple	Score	Dance	Music	Film	Result
Teuila & Scott	18 (6, 6, 6)	Paso doble	Theme from "X-Men"—John Ottman	X-Men	Eliminated
Jay-Jay & Enrique	19 (6, 7, 6)	Samba	"Shake Your Pom Pom"—Missy Elliott	Step Up 2	Safe
Shane & Nerida	23 (8, 8, 7)	Argentine tango	"Por Una Cabeza"—Carlos Gardel	Scent of a Woman	Safe
Chrystal & Jonny	27 (9, 9, 9)	Quickstep	"Show Me How You Burlesque"—Christina Aguilera	Burlesque	Safe
Siobhan & Charlie	24 (8, 8, 8)	Rumba	"On My Own"—Anne Hathaway	Les Misérables	Safe
Ben & Krystal	22 (7, 8, 7)	Viennese waltz	"A Thousand Years"—Christina Perri	Breaking Dawn – Part 1	Bottom two
Simon & Vanessa	28 (9, 10, 9)	Paso doble	"Eye of the Tiger"—Survivor	Rocky III	Safe

=== Week 6: 80s Night ===
Couples performed dances to music from the decade of the 80s.

Running order

Couple	Score	Dance	Music	Result
Simon & Vanessa	28 (10, 9, 9)	Samba	"Pour Some Sugar On Me"—Def Leppard	Safe
Ben & Krystal	20 (6, 7, 7)	Paso doble	"Another One Bites the Dust"—Queen	Eliminated
Jay-Jay & Enrique	23 (8, 8, 7)	Cha-cha-cha	"Pull Up to the Bumper"—Grace Jones	Bottom three
Shane & Nerida	23 (7, 8, 8)	Samba	"Conga"—Gloria Estefan	Eliminated
Chrystal & Jonny	29 (10, 10, 9)	Cha-cha-cha	"Kiss"—Tom Jones	Safe
Siobhan & Charlie	28 (9, 9, 10)	Salsa	"I Wanna Dance with Somebody"—Whitney Houston	Safe

=== Week 7: Semi-Final ===
Couples performed two dances for the first time in the competition, one involving a prop and the second a freestyle routine.

Running order

Couple	Score	Dance	Music	Result
Siobhan & Charlie	23 (8, 8, 7)	Jive	"Runaway Baby"—Bruno Mars	Safe
Siobhan & Charlie	27 (9, 9, 9)	Freestyle	"Chandelier"—Sia	Safe
Chrystal & Jonny	27 (9, 9, 9)	Samba	"Single Ladies (Put a Ring on It)"—Beyoncé	Bottom two
Chrystal & Jonny	30 (10, 10, 10)	Freestyle	"I'm Not the Only One"—Sam Smith	Bottom two
Jay-Jay & Enrique	24 (8, 8, 8)	Viennese waltz	"You Don't Own Me"—Grace feat. G-Eazy	Eliminated
Jay-Jay & Enrique	20 (7, 7, 6)	Freestyle	"Shut Up and Dance"—Walk the Moon	Eliminated
Simon & Vanessa	26 (9, 9, 8)	Cha-cha-cha	"I Don't Feel Like Dancin'"—Scissor Sisters	Safe
Simon & Vanessa	29 (10, 10, 9)	Freestyle	"Time After Time"—Cyndi Lauper	Safe

=== Week 8: Final ===
Couples performed two dances, one new style and their favourite dance of the season to reprise.

Running order (Dance 1)

Couple	Score	Dance	Music
Chrystal & Jonny	27 (9, 9, 9)	Rumba	"Bleeding Love"—Leona Lewis
Siobhan & Charlie	26 (9, 8, 9)	Paso doble	"Unstoppable"—E.S. Posthumus
Simon & Vanessa	27 (9, 9, 9)	Viennese waltz	"I Have Nothing"—Whitney Houston

Running order (Dance 2)

Couple	Score	Dance	Music	Result
Chrystal & Jonny	28 (9, 10, 9)	Jive	"Shake it Off"—Taylor Swift	Runners-up
Siobhan & Charlie	30 (10, 10, 10)	Rumba	"On My Own"—Anne Hathaway	Third place
Simon & Vanessa	30 (10, 10, 10)	Paso doble	"Eye of the Tiger"—Survivor	Winners

== Dance chart ==
Highest scoring dance
Lowest scoring dance

Couple	1	2	3	4	5	6	7		8	
Simon & Vanessa	Cha-cha-cha	Tango	Rumba	Foxtrot	Paso doble	Samba	Cha-cha-cha	Freestyle	Viennese waltz	Paso doble
Chrystal & Jonny	Jive	Waltz	Paso doble	Viennese waltz	Quickstep	Cha-cha-cha	Samba	Freestyle	Rumba	Jive
Siobhan & Charlie	Cha-cha-cha	Tango	Samba	Waltz	Rumba	Salsa	Jive	Freestyle	Paso doble	Rumba
Jay-Jay & Enrique	Jive	Quickstep	Rumba	Tango	Samba	Cha-cha-cha	Viennese waltz	Freestyle		
Shane & Nerida	Cha-cha-cha	Waltz	Jive	Quickstep	Argentine tango	Samba				
Ben & Krystal	Foxtrot	Samba	Cha-cha-cha	Rumba	Viennese waltz	Paso doble				
Teuila & Scott	Jive	Foxtrot	Rumba	Cha-cha-cha	Paso doble					
Pam & Matt	Foxtrot	Rumba	Samba	Tango						
Colin & Kristie	Jive	Foxtrot	Cha-cha-cha							
Maz & Caryn	Foxtrot	Cha-cha-cha								
