= Dancing with the Stars (New Zealand TV series) series 1 =

Dancing with the Stars
- Season 1
- Celebrity winner: Norm Hewitt
- Professional winner: Carol-Ann Hickmore
- No. of episodes: 8

Release
- Original network: TV One
- Original release: 1 May – 19 June 2005

Series chronology
- Next → Season 2

The first series of Dancing with the Stars premiered on 1 May 2005. The viewership hit around 730,000 and almost a million tuned into the final episode. It was won by Norm Hewitt and his partner Carol-Ann Hickmore, with 62.42% of the public vote. Shane Cortese placed second with 37.58%. In the semi-finals it was even closer with Hewitt winning 42.81% and Cortese winning 36.71% of the public vote. According to a TVNZ spokeswoman, 317,698 votes were cast for the final, of which 83,000 were 0900 calls, and the rest text messages. The series earned charities a combined total of more than $444,000, according to TVNZ.

== Contestants ==
Celebrity	Notability	Professional partner	Placing
Norm Hewitt	Former rugby union player	Carol-Ann Hickmore	Series Winners on 19 June 2005
Shane Cortese	Shortland Street actor	Nerida Lister	Runner-up on 19 June 2005
Tim Shadbolt	Invercargill mayor	Rebecca Nicholson	Eliminated 6th on 12 June 2005
Bernice Mene	Netball player	d'Artagnan Kennedy	Eliminated 5th on 5 June 2005
Theresa Healey	Shortland Street actress	Peter Wales	Eliminated 4th on 29 May 2005
Georgina Beyer	Labour Party politician	Michael Hoggard	Eliminated 3rd on 22 May 2005
Ewen Gilmour	Comedian	Lauren de Boeck	Eliminated 2nd on 15 May 2005
Nicky Watson	Model	Kiel de Buisson	Eliminated 1st on 8 May 2005

== Elimination ==
Red numbers indicate the couples with the lowest score for each week.
Green numbers indicate the couples with the highest score for each week.
indicates the couples eliminated that week.
indicates the returning couple that finished in the bottom two.
indicates the winning couple.
indicates the runner-up couple.

Team	Place	1	2	1+2	3	4	5	6	7	8
Norm & Carol-Ann	1	28	28	56	28	40	29	31+35=66	34+30=64	37+39+39=115
Shane & Nerida	2	22	32	54	29	31	29	28+37=65	33+35=68	37+39+38=114
Tim & Rebecca	3	23	25	48	21	19	20	14+23=37	23+19=42	
Bernice & d'Artagnan	4	19	27	46	25	23	24	29+30=59		
Theresa & Peter	5	29	25	54	28	31	27			
Georgina & Michael	6	19	25	44	25	22				
Ewan & Lauren	7	18	25	43	17					
Nicky & Kiel	8	26	22	48						

== Dance chart ==
Highest Scoring Dance
Lowest Scoring Dance

Team	1	2	3	4	5	6		7		8		
Norm & Carol-Ann	Waltz	Rumba	Tango	Paso Doble	Samba	Quickstep	Cha-Cha-Cha	Foxtrot	Jive	Waltz	Paso Doble	Freestyle
Shane & Nerida	Cha-Cha-Cha	Quickstep	Jive	Foxtrot	Samba	Waltz	Paso Doble	Tango	Rumba	Foxtrot	Rumba	Freestyle
Tim & Rebecca	Waltz	Rumba	Tango	Paso Doble	Samba	Foxtrot	Jive	Quickstep	Cha-Cha-Cha			
Bernice & d'Artagnan	Waltz	Rumba	Tango	Foxtrot	Samba	Quickstep	Paso Doble					
Theresa & Peter	Cha-Cha-Cha	Quickstep	Jive	Paso Doble	Samba							
Georgina & Michael	Waltz	Rumba	Tango	Foxtrot								
Ewan & Lauren	Cha-Cha-Cha	Quickstep	Jive									
Nicky & Kiel	Cha-Cha-Cha	Quickstep										

== Average chart ==
Rank by average	Competition finish	Couple	Total	Number of dances	Average
1	1	Norm & Carol-Ann	398	12	33.2
2	2	Shane & Nerida	390	12	32.5
3	5	Theresa & Peter	140	5	28.0
4	4	Bernice & d'Artagnan	177	7	25.3
5	8	Nicky & Kiel	48	2	24.0
6	6	Georgina & Michael	91	4	22.8
7	3	Tim & Rebecca	199	9	22.1
8	7	Ewan & Lauren	60	3	20.0
