= Norm Hewitt =

New Zealand rugby union player (1968–2024)

- Born: Norman Jason Hewitt; 11 November 1968 Hastings, New Zealand
- Died: 16 July 2024 (aged 55) Wellington, New Zealand
- Height: 1.78 m (5 ft 10 in)
- Weight: 108 kg (17 st 0 lb)
- School: Te Aute College

Rugby union career
- Position: Hooker
Provincial / State sides
Years	Team	Apps	(Points)
1988–1994	Hawke's Bay	92	(65)
1995–1997	Southland	22	(35)
1999–2001	Wellington	31	(5)
Super Rugby
Years	Team	Apps	(Points)
1996–2001	Hurricanes	66	(10)
International career
Years	Team	Apps	(Points)
1993–1998	New Zealand	9	(0)
1990–2001	New Zealand Māori	15	(29)
Medal record
Men's rugby union
Representing New Zealand
Rugby World Cup
Silver medal – second place	1995 South Africa	Team

Norman Jason Hewitt (11 November 1968 – 16 July 2024) was a New Zealand rugby union player who played as a hooker. He won nine caps for the New Zealand national team, the All Blacks. Hewitt participated in, and won, season one of Dancing with the Stars in 2005.

== Rugby career ==
Although in All Blacks squads from 1993 until 1999, Hewitt’s appearances were limited by the presence of Sean Fitzpatrick and later selectors also preferring Anton Oliver and Mark Hammett. He played 9 test matches (4 as a substitute) and 14 other matches for the New Zealand national team.

Hewitt played nearly 300 first class rugby matches. This included 15 for New Zealand Māori, 66 Super Rugby and 143 National Provincial Championship (NPC) matches. He captained New Zealand A and New Zealand Maori, the Hurricanes, Hawke’s Bay and Wellington.

Career highlights include:

- Hawke’s Bay's defeats of the 1993 British Lions (29–17) and the 1994 French tourists (30–25).
- being named the 1996 NPC Second Division Player of the Year.
- missing just one match in the first five years of Super 12.
- scoring seven tries for the All Blacks, although none in test matches.
- never losing in a test match, he played in eight All Black test wins and a draw against England.
- captaining Wellington to the NPC title against Canterbury in 2000, playing the majority of the final with a broken wrist.

At club level he represented Napier Tech Old Boys, Taradale, Albion and Wellington.

== Personal life ==
Hewitt was born in Hawke’s Bay, where he was also raised. Of Māori descent, he identified with Ngāti Kahungunu and Ngāti Tūwharetoa. He was married to former world aerobic champion Arlene Thomas, who teaches group fitness at Jenkins Gym in Wellington.

Hewitt made a public apology after a drunken incident in 1998, and thereafter became an outspoken advocate of changing drinking habits.

Hewitt and professional dancer Carol-Ann Hickmore won the first series of Dancing with the Stars (New Zealand) on 19 June 2005. He donated his winnings to literacy charity Duffy Books in Homes, and was associated with Rangikura School, a primary school in Porirua.

In 2006 Hewitt's brother Rob, a Navy diver, was rescued after surviving four days and three nights floating in the sea off the coast of Porirua.

In 2018, Hewitt was featured in the documentary Making Good Men, which highlights the relationship between Hewitt and former schoolmate Manu Bennett.

Hewitt died in Wellington from motor neurone disease on 16 July 2024, at the age of 55.

Awards and achievements
New title	Dancing with the Stars (New Zealand) winner (with partner Carol-Ann Hickmore); Season 1 (2005)	Succeeded by Lorraine Downes & Aaron Gilmore
