= The Shopping Channel (New Zealand TV channel) =

New Zealand TV channel

- The Shopping Channel logo
- Country: New Zealand
- Broadcast area: National
- Headquarters: Auckland, New Zealand

Programming
- Picture format: 720x576i (anamorphic widescreen)

Ownership
- Owner: Ogilvy New Zealand

History
- Launched: 1 October 2012
- Closed: 1 April 2017 (Freeview); 19 November 2024 (Sky)

Links
- Website: The Shopping Channel (closed down)

The Shopping Channel was a New Zealand 24/7 infomercial channel which was broadcast on Sky satellite. The company was founded in 2010 and went live on 1 October 2012.

The Shopping Channel was owned by entrepreneur Greg Partington and was headquartered in Auckland, New Zealand.

== History ==
In April 2011, NZ government-owned national broadcaster Television New Zealand announced that it would be discontinuing its commercial-free 24-hour news and information channel TVNZ 7 from July 2012, which was utilising freeview digital channel 7 at that time. Greg Partington commenced negotiations with Television NZ to have The Shopping Channel broadcast on the same channel once TVNZ 7 had been closed down. However an agreement was not reached, and Partington subsequently took the concept to SKY TV.

The channel was formerly broadcast on channel 18 on the Freeview terrestrial and satellite platforms until April 2017.

The channel was closed in April 2017 on Freeview, and 19 November 2024 on Sky.

== Format ==
The Shopping Channel broadcasts wall-to-wall infomercial content from TV Shop 24 hours a day, seven days a week (except on Sundays between 6am-12pm, Anzac Day between 6am-12pm and all day Good Friday, Easter Sunday and Christmas Day when documentaries from DW-TV are being broadcast; this is due to the Broadcasting Act 1989 which states that no commercial advertising can be shown on New Zealand television during those hours).

TV Shop offers a range of lifestyle and innovative products including health and fitness, home appliances, cleaning, toys and DIY, marketed through direct response television advertising, retail and online stores in New Zealand and Australia. TV Shop is part of Brand Developers, which also includes Thin Lizzy, Bambillo, PowerFit, Nutri-Infusion, Bowflex and The Renovator.

From launch until late 2013 the format was similar to the advertorial channels TVSN, TV4ME and eXtra that are carried on the three Australian metropolitan commercial networks of which eight hours each day was live, with pre-recorded content constituting the remaining 16 hours. The channel showcased various products which viewers could purchase by an e-commerce website or by phone. The website and phone line were shut down late 2013. As with most home shopping cable channels, these products, such as jewellery and dresses, were mainly aimed at a female audience.

== Past presenters ==
- Albert Mitton
- Aleysha Knowles
- Candy Lane
- Charlie Gautier
- Fiona McDonald
- Gaia Chinniah
- Louise Mills
- Luca Villari
- Lucy Gallaugher
- Mike Puru
- Monty Betham
- Peter Meikle
- Petra Rijnbeek
- Timothy Giles
- James Cheney
- Suzanne Paul
