= Jazz Thornton =

New Zealand mental health activist (born 1995)

- Born: 29 March 1995 (age 31)
- Education: South Seas Film & Television School
- Notable work: Stop Surviving Start Fighting; Voices of Hope

Jazz Thornton (born 29 March 1995) is a New Zealand mental health activist, author, speaker, TikToker and filmmaker. Thornton co-founded a suicide prevention organisation, Voices of Hope, with eating disorder activist Genevieve Mora. Thornton has written three books: an autobiography Stop Surviving, Start Fighting, My Journey Starts Here, a guided journal for improving well-being, and Letters to you, a book of letters to provide support, information, encouragement and tips on practical help for anyone suffering low moments. The 2020 New Zealand documentary The Girl on the Bridge deals with her struggles with mental health. In the documentary, Thornton meditated on losing her friend Jess to suicide.

Thornton was declared 2021 Young New Zealander of the Year.

== Biography ==
As a teenager, Thornton attempted suicide 14 times.

In 2016, as a film student, Thornton created the viral video Dear Suicidal Me, which featured people, including Thornton, who have tried to end their life. The video had more than 80 million views after being covered by international media.

In 2017, Thornton's pitch for a documentary won the Doc Edge Doco Pitch competition in a panel of more than 20 industry professionals, including panelists from Australia and the US. She was the youngest ever person to win it.

In 2018, Thornton met Prince Harry and Meghan Markle on their visit to New Zealand.

In 2019, Thornton took part in the United Nations' mental health campaign Speak Your Mind and co-hosted the launch in New York. In the same year, Thornton took a photo with the police officer who saved her life from a suicide attempt and wrote an open letter to her. Thornton also urged Kiwis not to be discouraged by suicide figures. "I was not hugely surprised. I was always hoping for a different number, but I think anyone working in the advocacy and mental health area knows that there is more likely to be a peak before we see the decrease of the effects of what's going on." Thornton was featured in an exhibition on mental health at the London Museum of Lost and Found Potential.

In 2020, Thornton wanted to search for the stranger who prevented her suicide attempt. Queen Elizabeth II commended Thornton and Genevieve Mora for their work on Voices of Hope. They were also invited by Prince William and Prince Harry to discuss their work at Buckingham Palace. The New Zealand government spent $30,000 on influencers, including Thornton, to post about vocational training.

Thornton produced the documentary Jessica's Tree on the suicide of her friend Jess. It won gold in a New York film festival.

In February 2021, Thornton said the Ministry of Health silences criticism about New Zealand's mental health. "The mental health system is functioning the same way that it has for so many years, which is a way that is silencing, which is a way that is discrediting of what people are going through. There are a lot of decisions being made in our Ministry [of Health] that do silence people. But my question is, what’s the danger in not talking about it?". Thornton said after the film The Girl at the Bridge was released, government-funded mental health organisations that initially supported the project backed out because they couldn't be seen endorsing something critical of the Ministry of Health.

Thornton won the 2022 season of the dancing show Dancing with the Stars.

== Personal life ==
In 2020, Thornton was diagnosed with attention deficit hyperactivity disorder.

Thornton revealed that she was sexually abused as a three-year-old child till her teenage years and also suffered constant bullying in school.

== Work ==
=== Books ===
- Thornton, Jazz (2020). Stop Surviving Start Fighting. New Zealand: Penguin Random House New Zealand Limited. ISBN 9780143774136.
- Thornton, Jazz; Mora, Genevieve (2021). My Journey Starts Here. New Zealand: Penguin Group New Zealand, Limited. ISBN 978-0143775676.
- Thornton, Jazz (2022). Letters to you : words of support and inspiration for difficult times. Auckland, New Zealand : Penguin Random House New Zealand. ISBN 9780143776611

=== Films ===
Year	Title	Role
2005	Attitude	Self
2013	Metamorphosis	Actress
2017	West of Eden	Actress
2017	The Kidnapping	Actress
2019	Jessica's Tree	Director
2020	The Girl on the Bridge	Self
2026	Stalked	Self
