= Kerre Woodham =

New Zealand broadcaster

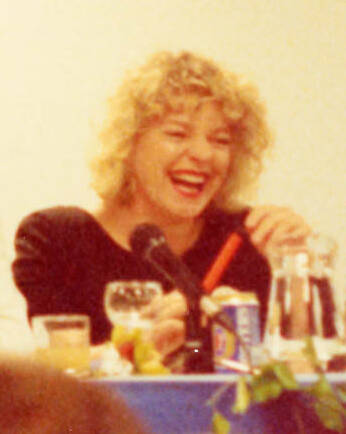
Woodham at the Celebrity Debate at the Takapuna Library in 1993

Kerre Woodham (born 1964 or 1965), formerly known as Kerre McIvor, is a New Zealand journalist, radio presenter, author and columnist. At the end of 2017 she was named as the replacement for Andrew Dickens on Newstalk ZB Sunday mornings beginning in 2018 and Leighton Smith on mornings beginning in 2019.

== Career ==
Woodham studied journalism at Wellington Polytechnic. She started out in radio, spending two years at Radio New Zealand moving into television as a reporter for Video Dispatch. In 1986, she joined the consumer affairs programme Fair Go. as a reporter. She left the show in 1990 to host a breakfast radio programme but later worked on TV3's Nightline. She presented New Zealand communities on Heartland between 1994 and 1997. In 1998, she began hosting Ready, Steady, Cook, which continued until 2005. At the same time, she presented a range of current affairs and topical items on New Zealand national television, and was also a panellist on How's Life?.

Woodham is also a columnist for the Herald on Sunday, a national newspaper.

In 2010, Woodham wrote her first book titled Short Fat Chick in Paris and followed it in 2011 with Short Fat Chick to Marathon Runner. Her third book, published in 2013 was Musings from Middle Age.

In 2016 she was presented with a Scroll of Honour from the Variety Artists Club of New Zealand for services to charity and New Zealand broadcasting.

Woodham was a contestant on the 2022 season of the dancing show Dancing with the Stars.

== Personal life ==
Woodham married Tom McIvor on 2 February 2013. Following the breakup of their marriage, she returned to using her maiden name.
