= Cory Hutchings =

New Zealand surfer

Personal information
- Full name: Cory Francis Hutchings
- Born: 8 March 1972 (age 54) Gisborne, New Zealand

Sport
- Sport: Surf Lifesaving
- Event: Ironman
- Retired: 2003

Cory Francis Hutchings (born 5 March 1972) is a former world surf lifesaving Ironman champion from Gisborne, New Zealand. Hutchings was born in Gisborne to a family of passionate sportspeople. His father Ben was the coach of the New Zealand men's canoeing team who won gold in four events at the 1984 Los Angeles Olympics. Cory's involvement in surf lifesaving begun at age five.

== Career ==
Hutchings held the New Zealand Ironman title for more than a decade. He also represented New Zealand as an individual and as part of the national team. At the beginning of his career he had trouble finding a sponsor. As a last resort he approached Durex condoms who were more than happy to sponsor him, making Hutchings the first athlete in New Zealand to be sponsored by a condom company which was controversial at the time. In 1994, he suffered from a debilitating bout of Hepatitis A which was picked up through water contamination at Manly, Sydney. During this time he ate three peeled beetroot a day as medication. Hutchings won the World Surf Ironman biannual title in 1998, 2000 and 2002. He retired from the professional circuit in 2003.

Hutchings is currently working as an ambassador for SPARC's Sports Ambassador Programme. The mentoring programme aims to assist promising young athletes in achieving sporting goals.

=== Sporting Achievements ===
- 1995 - 2nd in the Board and 3rd in the Ironman at the Australian National Championships
- 1995 - Won the New Zealand National Surf League Open Ironman
- 1996 - Won the New Zealand National Surf League Open Ironman
- 1996 - 2nd in the World Ironman
- 1997 - Won the New Zealand National Surf League Open Ironman
- 1998 - World IronMan Champion
- 1998 - NZ IronMan Champion
- 1999 - NZ IronMan Champion
- 1999 - NZ Board Champion
- 1999 - NZ Surf Swim Champion
- 2000 - 2nd Place in the Kellogg's Professional Surf League IronMan series
- 2000 - NZ IronMan Champion
- 2000 - NZ Board Champion
- 2000 - NZ Surf Swim Champion
- 2000 - World IronMan Champion
- 2002 - World IronMan Champion

== Television appearances ==
Cory hosted TV2's local surf lifesaving television series Surf Club 174, and appeared as a contestant on the televisions shows Celebrity Treasure Island and Dancing with the Stars
