= The Real Housewives of Auckland =

New Zealand reality television series

- Genre: Reality television
- Based on: The Real Housewives
- Starring: Anne Batley-Burton; Michelle Blanchard; Gilda Kirkpatrick; Julia Sloane; Angela Stone; Louise Wallace
- Country of origin: New Zealand
- Original language: English
- No. of seasons: 2
- No. of episodes: 10

Production
- Executive producers: Kylie Washington; Hayley Cunningham; Cameron Craig; Andrew Szusterman
- Producer: Philippa Rubira
- Production location: Auckland, New Zealand
- Editors: Dayna Climo; Samantha Sperlich
- Camera setup: Multiple
- Running time: 43 minutes
- Production company: Matchbox Entertainment

Original release
- Network: Bravo
- Release: 22 August – 18 October 2016
- Release: 17 December 2020

Related
- The Real Housewives of Melbourne; The Real Housewives of Sydney

The Real Housewives of Auckland (RHOAKL) is a New Zealand high-end reality television series that premiered on Bravo on 22 August 2016.

Developed as an international installment of the American The Real Housewives franchise, it has currently aired one season and a spin-off special episode & focuses on the personal and professional lives of several ladies living in Auckland, New Zealand.

== Overview and Production ==
=== Season 1 ===
The Real Housewives of Auckland was officially announced on 24 January 2016. Developed as an international installment of the American The Real Housewives franchise, it is the second installment of the franchise by Matchbox Pictures, following The Real Housewives of Melbourne. In May 2016, Anne Batley-Burton, Michelle Blanchard, Gilda Kirkpatrick, Julia Sloane, Angela Stone, and Louise Wallace were announced as the cast members for the show's debut season. The series premiered on Bravo on 22 August 2016.

Executive producer Kylie Washington described the cast of the first season as "people who are the life of the party – the party is them – it's around them, so it doesn't matter where they are, something's always happening." Washington also revealing, "'We're pretty tongue in cheek with it as well. We know what we are, we're not pretending to be anything else. Already [the Auckland Housewives] are showing that they have the right spirit.'" A second season was reported as likely. The first season concluded on 18 October 2016, and did not feature a reunion. The network provided one-on-one interviews with the cast via their Facebook pages, following the final episode.

In October 2016, following airing of the first season, production company Matchbox Pictures confirmed there were ongoing discussions for a second season. That same month, contract details for the cast were leaked to The New Zealand Herald. In November 2016, the series was not included in Bravo's programming highlights for the 2017 broadcast season. In April 2018, a Bravo spokesperson revealed that there was no immediate plans to return the series for a second season.

=== Get Housewived ===
On 17 December 2020, the cast, minus Sloane, reunited for a special episode entitled, Get Housewived.

== Cast ==
Main cast members
Cast member	Seasons	
Cast member	1	Get Housewived
Anne Batley-Burton	Main	Main
Michelle Blanchard	Main	Main
Gilda Kirkpatrick	Main	Main
Julia Sloane	Main	
Angela Stone	Main	Main
Louise Wallace	Main	Main

== Taglines ==
- Julia: "If people are talking behind your back, then you're the one in front."
- Michelle: "I used to strut my stuff on the catwalk, now I'm a model housewife."
- Louise: "I made my money the old fashioned way, I inherited it."
- Angela: "My name may be Stone, but everything I touch turns to gold."
- Gilda: "I never start a fight I can't win."
- Anne: "I'm like a fine champagne, I bubble, I fizz and I'm the life of the party."

== Controversy ==
During the first season's episode 6, titled "Healing Hands" which aired on 20 September 2016, cast member Julia Sloane made a racial slur against fellow cast member Michelle Blanchard, referring to her as "boat nigger". During the broadcast of the episode, the network had cancelled all advertising. Before the episode aired, the network released a statement on the issue saying, "We have taken this matter very seriously. Bravo has given much consideration to ensuring the events are accurately represented, in order that the context of the remark and subsequent events can be fully understood. While the nature of Bravo programming is unscripted, it is a deeply regrettable incident which we are endeavoring to deal with in a responsible manner". Sloane has also made a statement admitting that there was "no excuse for using offensive word" and that she has apologized to Blanchard.

Since the racial slur was made and broadcast, Sloane's husband Michael Lorimer has claimed the remark was taken out of context to make his wife look bad and said that the couple also had taken legal action to contact Bravo to have the episode amended. The couple also has hired Deborah Pead, "one of the public relations industry's heaviest hitters".

On 26 September 2016, Race Relations Commissioner Dame Susan Devoy was contacted by The New Zealand Herald and commented, "I do not think that overt racist behaviour is a part of kiwi culture so we all need to call it out when it rears its very ugly head, People like Julia need to understand that using words like that is not how we roll here. That is not us." Since Devoy's remarks, the couple has contacted their lawyers who have claimed Devoy as a bully, however Devoy has since denied those claims.

During the season in episode 8, titled "You Drive Me Crazy" which aired on 4 October 2016, it was revealed that Kirk Hope, chief executive of Business New Zealand, had allegedly left Angela Stone on 12 occasions. Mr Hope was criticised for telling Angela that he wanted to spend more time with "his mates".

== Episodes ==
Series	Episodes	Originally released	
Series	Episodes	First released	Last released
1	10	22 August 2016	18 October 2016
Special		17 December 2020	

=== Season 1 (2016) ===
Anne Batley-Burton, Michelle Blanchard, Gilda Kirkpatrick, Julia Sloane, Angela Stone, and Louise Wallace are introduced as series regulars.

No. overall	No. in season	Title	Original release date	Total NZ viewers
1	1	"Model Behaviour"	22 August 2016	632,600
The Ladies attend a fashion show and during lunch at an exclusive Auckland restaurant for Julia's birthday, Angela is offended by Michelles comment.
2	2	"Loose Lips"	August 2016	632,600
After feeling like she got off on the wrong foot with the ladies, Michelle invites them to dinner where Julia reveals some gossip about Gilda.
3	3	"Pussy Galore"	30 August 2016	N/A
Anne hosts a fabulous "pussy galore" event, where the housewives attend dressed like cats. Louise attempts to reconcile with Gilda by apologizing, but the other ladies just can't seem to leave the drama behind.
4	4	"Tickle Me Pink"	6 September 2016	N/A
Michelle meets Angela to work out their problems after Anne's "pussy galore." Whether they reconcile or not remains to be seen. Anne has bird issues with a seagull.
5	5	"Tropic Thunder"	13 September 2016	599,000
Louise has invited the girls on a holiday to Port Douglas. The girls are having fun and forming friendships. But on a boat trip they enter stormy waters when one drops a comment that will change everything.
6	6	"Healing Hands"	20 September 2016	824,000
Tensions are running high following the boat trip and the ladies attempt to navigate the fallout. With Michelle and Julia still not talking to each other, the rest of the group try to resume the holiday.
7	7	"Hit Me With Your Best Shot"	27 September 2016	N/A
The housewives are regrouping in Auckland after the Port Douglas fallout. In an attempt to lighten the mood, Michelle takes Anne to a hip hop class. Angela has a special photo shoot and Julia invites the others to another kind of shoot.
8	8	"You Drive Me Crazy"	4 October 2016	N/A
The wives get behind the wheel for some competitive car racing. Gilda and Anne get a surprise at an art class, while Angela opens up to Louise.
9	9	"Launch Off"	11 October 2016	784,000
Tensions arise between Gilda and Angela over the two launching their books, resulting in the two facing off again.
10	10	"Surprise!"	18 October 2016	616,000
Gilda invites all the ladies to a surprise birthday party for Michelle.

=== Special (2020) ===
Sloane departed as a series regular.

No. overall	No. in season	Title	Original release date	Total NZ viewers
11	1	"Get Housewived"	17 December 2020	N/A

== Broadcast ==
In Australia, the series premiered on Arena on 28 August 2016. In the United Kingdom, the series premiered on Lifetime on 28 March 2017. The show premiered in the United States on Bravo on 22 July 2017. The series is available to stream in most countries on Hayu.

== Reception ==
The Real Housewives of Auckland premiered with two episodes that aired to a combine over a total of 632,600 viewers. A spokesperson for the network praised the ratings also revealing that the episodes were number one in the 25-54-year-old female demographic as well as commanding a 19 percent share of female TV viewers. The first half of the first season averaged a total of 339,000 viewers, with episode five airing to a 599,000 viewers. Episode six saw an increase in viewers, rising to a total off 824,000 viewers. Following the controversy in episode six viewership declined with episode nine being to lowest rated episode in the season, airing to 784,000 viewers. Following the decrease in viewership in episode nine; episode ten, that served as the finale for the series, rose to 616,000 total viewers. Despite the slight decline in rating, general manager for the network, Maria Mahoney, has claimed that the ratings have been a success for the network and aided in a 50 per cent increase in peak viewing.
