= Gilda Kirkpatrick =

Architect, author, creative director and reality star

Gilda Kirkpatrick (born 1973) is an Iranian-born New Zealand author, creative director and television personality. She starred as a main housewife on The Real Housewives of Auckland, which aired on Bravo. She was also the first contestant to be eliminated from Dancing With the Stars New Zealand in 2018.

She also wrote two educational series of sci-fi comic books called Astarons.

== The Real Housewives of Auckland ==
In 2016, Kirkpatrick signed on for The Real Housewives of Auckland. One of her quotes, "Do you know what I've heard about you, not a f*****g thing", was responsible for her becoming an internet meme. Kirkpatrick and fellow cast member Angela Stone sparred throughout the series following the exposure of information about Kirkpatrick which was "bleeped" out during episode two. The revelation came amidst claims by Stone of bullying by Kirkpatrick and Blanchard.

Kirkpatrick also stated in an interview, "I also had a good conversation with Kylie Washington, the producer from Australia. She came to my house and I admired her as a woman. She explained that sometimes people aren’t happy with the programme – but if you be yourself then you’ll have no regrets. Plus she said that they wanted to hang onto us for a second series. So if you’re unhappy it’s no good for us".

== Astarons ==
Astarons is a series of educational books, written in the sci-fi comic genre, for kids aged seven and over. The books are about eight super heroes going on a journey through the Solar System, exploring the galaxy and further galaxies to the edge of the universe.

== Personal life ==
Born in Iran, she moved to New Zealand and married James Kirkpatrick, forty-three years her senior. They divorced in 2014. She joined the 2022 Wellington protest against COVID-19 vaccine mandates. During the 2023 general election Kirkpatrick hosted National, ACT and New Zealand First leaders at her Orakei Home, later describing on Twitter, National and ACT policies as woke.
