= Lorraine Downes =

New Zealand beauty pageant contestant

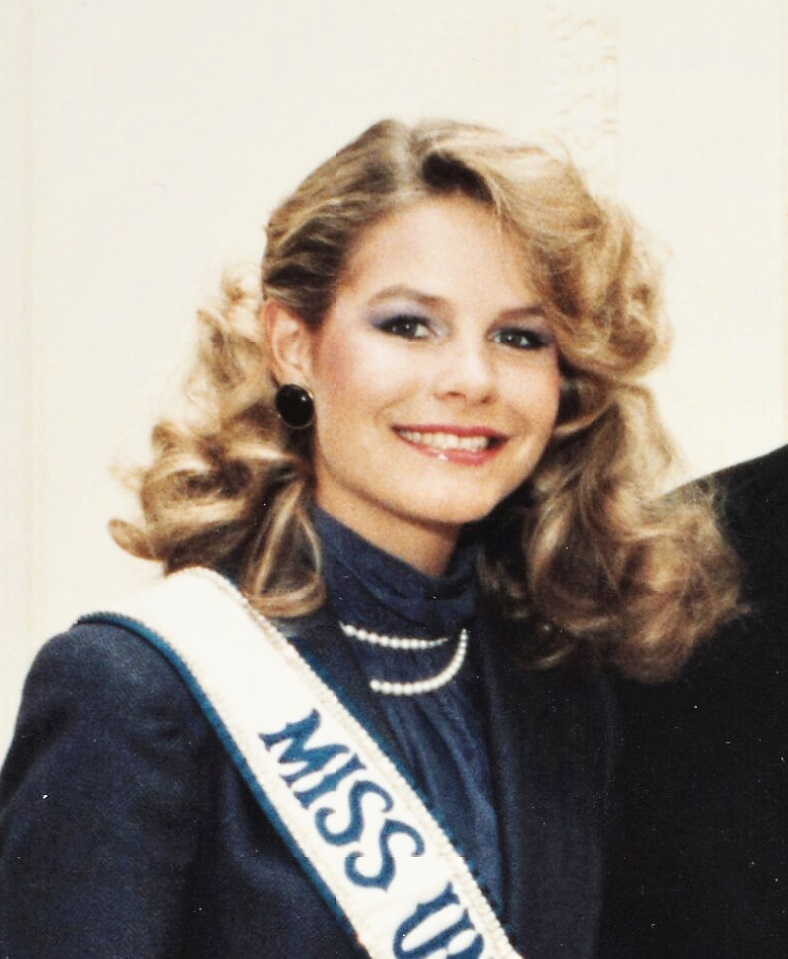
- Downes in the Oval Office,1984
- Born: Lorraine Elizabeth Downes; 12 June 1964 (age 62); Auckland, New Zealand
- Height: 1.74 m (5 ft 8 1/2 in)
- Spouses: Murray Mexted (m. 1986; div. 2001) Martin Crowe (m. 2009; died 2016)
- Children: 2
- Beauty pageant titleholder
- Title: Miss Universe New Zealand 1983; Miss Universe 1983
- Hair color: Blonde
- Eye color: Blue green

Lorraine Elizabeth Downes (born 12 June 1964) is a New Zealand dancer and beauty queen who won the Miss Universe title in 1983 and the New Zealand version of the reality TV show Dancing with the Stars in 2006.

== Early life ==
Downes was born in Auckland to Lloyd and Glad Downes. She is one of four daughters, Her sisters are Sue, Jenny and Carolyn.

== Miss Universe ==
Downes won the Miss Universe New Zealand title and went on to represent her country at the 1983 Miss Universe pageant broadcast live from St. Louis, Missouri in July 1983. After the preliminary competition, Downes made the top twelve cut in sixth place, but placed second in the final evening gown competition, third in the interview competition, and fourth in swimsuit. She made the final five in third place behind Julie Hayek of the USA and Lolita Morena of Switzerland, and was eventually crowned Miss Universe.

She wore a midnight blue gown and long gloves during the competition. Downes' win was New Zealand's first in the pageant's history, although Diana Delyse Nottle had placed second runner-up to Shawn Weatherly in 1980 and Donella Thomsen was a semi-finalist in 1981. No other delegate from New Zealand made the cut until 1992.

=== Life after Miss Universe ===
In 1986, Lorraine Downes married Murray Mexted, a New Zealand rugby All Black, with whom she had two children, before divorcing in 2001. In 2009, Downes married former New Zealand international cricket captain Martin Crowe. She and Crowe remained together until his death from lymphoma in 2016.

After years of relative anonymity, Downes competed in and won the New Zealand version of Dancing with the Stars in 2006 with dance partner Aaron Gilmore.

Awards and achievements
Preceded by (Canada) Karen Baldwin	Miss Universe; 1983	Succeeded by (Sweden) Yvonne Ryding
Preceded by Norm Hewitt & Carol-Ann Hickmore	Dancing with the Stars winner 2006 (Season 2); With: Aaron Gilmore	Succeeded by Suzanne Paul & Stefano Olivieri
