= Candy Lane =

New Zealand choreographer, dancer and television presenter

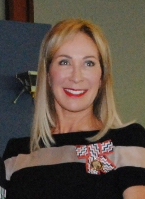
Lane in 2014

Candy Michele Lane QSM is a New Zealand dancer, choreographer and television presenter. She co-presented TVNZ's Dancing With The Stars with Jason Gunn, and also choreographed New Zealand's Got Talent, The Singing Bee, and Stars in Their Eyes. Most recently she was the Head Judge of the 2015 series of Dancing With the Stars. In August 2021, it was announced that she would feature in the 2021 Season of Celebrity Treasure Island 2021.

She relocated to Australia in 2022 to be closer to her family.

== Dance career ==
=== Performance ===
Auckland-born Lane first represented New Zealand in dancing when she was 10 years old, and as a 14-year-old became the youngest person to win the New Zealand Amateur titles. Aged 15, she went to London to train, dancing on the world circuit for 10 years and performing lead roles in the West End, including playing Anita in West Side Story.

At 18, Lane became the youngest person to win the professional Australasian and South Pacific championships, which she went on to win five times. With her partner Doug Newton, she won the Professional Latin title at the Australian Championships in 1977, 1978 and 1979. She reached a ranking of third in the world for dance.

=== Choreography ===
Lane has choreographed several New Zealand television shows, including The Singing Beeand Dancing with the Stars, Stars in Their Eyes and New Zealand's Got Talent.

=== Teaching and judging ===
In 1990, she established her own dance troupe, The Candy Lane Dancers. She then opened a dance school, Candy Lane Dance Studios, in the Auckland suburb of Mount Eden.

An International Adjudicator, she has judged at the Ballroom and Latin American World Championships and many other international competitions.

== Television presenting ==
=== Dancing With The Stars ===
Lane was co-host alongside Jason Gunn of five series of the New Zealand version of Dancing with the Stars between 2005 and 2009. She specifically presented the backstage interviews with the dancers and the half- and full-time leaderboards. She often danced with Brendan Cole, a judge on the show. On the final episode of each season, Lane performed in a choreographed "spectacular", featuring the dancers from the show, Gunn and The Candy Lane Dancers. Lane was the head judge for the 2015 revival on TV3.

=== The Shopping Channel ===
In October 2012 Lane became one of the inaugural presenters on The Shopping Channel, New Zealand's first home shopping channel.

== Fashion design ==
Lane launched a line of dance-inspired leisure clothing, "Dancesport" in 2008.

== Honours ==
In the 2014 New Year Honours, Lane was awarded the Queens Service Medal for services to dance.

In October 2015 she was presented with a Scroll of Honour from the Variety Artists Club of New Zealand for her services to New Zealand entertainment.

== See also ==
- List of New Zealand television personalities
