= Brendon Pongia =

New Zealand former professional basketball player

- Born: 27 June 1969 (age 57); Greymouth, New Zealand
- Relatives: Quentin Pongia (brother); Jim Calder (grandfather)
- Basketball career

Personal information
- Listed height: 188 cm (6 ft 2 in)
- Listed weight: 90 kg (198 lb)

Career information
- Playing career: 1993–2009
- Position: Guard

Career history
- 1993: Waitakere Rangers
- 1994–1996: Hawke's Bay Hawks
- 1997–2001: North Harbour Vikings/Kings
- 2002: Waikato Titans
- 2003: Harbour Heat
- 2006–2008: Wellington Saints
- 2009: Southland Flyers

Career highlights
- NBL champion (2002)

Brendon Te Mauri Pongia (born 27 June 1969) is a New Zealand former professional basketball player who played 14 seasons in the National Basketball League (NBL). He is also a television presenter, having co-hosted Good Morning alongside Sarah Bradley between 2006 and 2011.

== Early life ==
Born in Greymouth, New Zealand, Pongia grew up on the West Coast of the South Island. His father, a Māori, walked out on the family when Pongia was very young. As a 16-year-old in 1986, Pongia began training with NBL club Hamilton.

== Basketball career ==
A stalwart of the National Basketball League through the 1990s, Pongia earned greatest recognition in 2001 as a member of the Tall Black squad that defeated Australia to qualify for the 2002 FIBA World Championship. Although he saw little actual court time, he was front and centre in the pre-match build-ups as leader of the haka. He finally captured an NBL title with the Waikato Titans in 2002, but lost his place in the national side. Pongia attended the world tournament in Indianapolis as a spectator and enjoyed a high profile in TV coverage, leading the supporters' haka. He was subsequently offered a presenters' role with TVNZ and later Sky TV in 2003.

After a two-year hiatus from the NBL in 2004 and 2005, Pongia returned to the league with the Wellington Saints in 2006. He played three seasons with the Saints, before departing the NBL following the 2008 season. In July 2009, he signed with the Southland Flyers for the National Provincial Championships. The Flyers went on to win the Open Men's championship with the help of Pongia, who served as team captain.

== Personal ==
In March 2009, Pongia married his wife Michelle Kirkland. Pongia's brother, rugby league player Quentin Pongia, died of cancer in May 2019.

In 2007, Pongia was a contestant on Dancing with the Stars alongside dance partner Hayley Holt. The couple were eliminated in the penultimate episode.

Awards and achievements
Preceded by Danyon Loader & Hayley Holt	Dancing with the Stars (New Zealand) third place contestant Season 3 (2007 with Hayley Holt)	Succeeded by Miriama Smith & Jonny Williams
