= Rachel White (dancer) =

- Born: Rachel Burstein; Tbilisi, USSR
- Occupation: Dancer
- Spouse: Stu White
- Awards: 2x New Zealand Professional Latin Champion

Rachel White is a professional dancer. A two-time New Zealand Professional Latin Champion, White was the co-owner of JustDance studio in Los Angeles, and a judge on the television series Dancing With the Stars New Zealand.

== Early life ==
Rachel White was born Rachel Burstein in Tbilisi, USSR, and later moved to the United States at the age of four.

== Career ==
Rachel White is a two-time New Zealand Professional Latin Champion. She is the co-owner of JustDance studio in Los Angeles, and has been ranked as high as the fifth top female dance teacher in the US by Dancesport World Series. As an instructor, she has also assembled classes meant for those with dementia in order to help in their cognitive health.

In 2009 White competed in the television competition Dancing With the Stars New Zealand, where she placed third while partnered with Josh Kronfeld. In 2017 White placed 8th in the Professional Smooth category at the Open British Ballroom Championship in Blackpool. In 2018 White then joined the television judging panel for Dancing With the Stars New Zealand. She returned the following season in order to continue as a judge for the show. As a judge, she has also danced in exhibition numbers shown as a part of the show.

== Personal life ==
White is married to her husband, New Zealand born Stu White.
