= Hayley Holt =

New Zealand television presenter

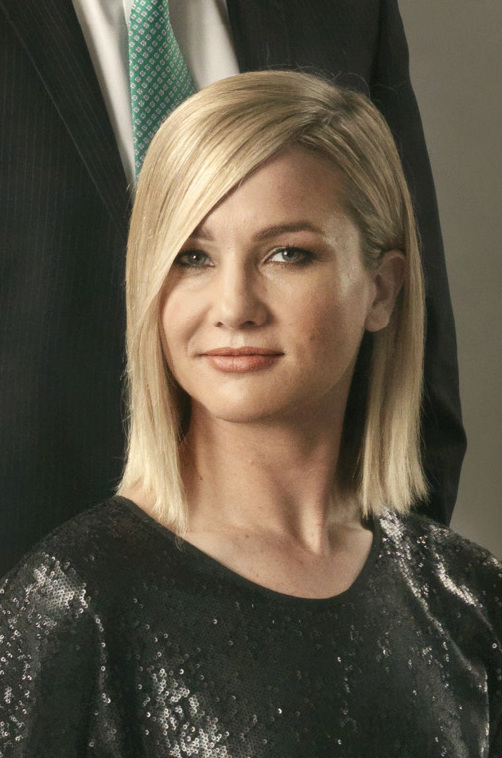
- Holt in 2017
- Born: 3 July 1980 (age 46)
- Occupation: Television presenter
- Political party: Green
- Partner: Josh Tito (2020–present)
- Children: 2

Hayley Doreen Holt (born 3 July 1980) is a New Zealand television presenter and former snowboarder and ballroom dancer, who presents sports news on 1 News At 6pm. She co-presented TVNZ Breakfast from 2018 to 2020 alongside Jack Tame and later John Campbell, and earlier was notable for her appearances on several reality television series, as well as co-hosting a networked breakfast show on More FM from 2012 to 2013. She stood in the 2017 general election for the Green Party.

== Early life ==
Holt was born in Auckland, grew up in the suburb of Epsom and attended Epsom Girls' Grammar School.

== Dancing career ==
Holt started ballroom and Latin dancing at the age of seven, and was placed 19th in the Blackpool Rising Star Professional Ballroom Competition and was sixth in the US Open Rising Star Professional Ballroom Competition. She has also trained in jazz dance and studied for many years with Candy Lane. Holt's professional dance partner is David Yeates.

Holt joined the second season of the New Zealand TV show Dancing with the Stars in 2006, becoming the professional partner of swimmer Danyon Loader—the couple were eliminated in the semi-final. During the third season, Holt was the partner of basketball player Brendon Pongia and was again eliminated in the semi-final. In the fourth season, Holt was partnered with DJ Peter Urlich and was eliminated in episode three.

Holt participated in the sixth series of Strictly Come Dancing as the professional partner of swimmer Mark Foster. Holt and Foster were voted off on 26 October, placing 11th overall. She did not return for series 7.

== TV appearances ==
In 2007, Holt won TV2's Treasure Island: Pirates of the Pacific as one of "The Others". On 5 October 2008 Holt appeared on TV2's Shock Treatment. On 28 October 2008 she was interviewed on Campbell Live.

Since December 2009, Holt had been working on The Crowd Goes Wild, as a reporter and occasional presenter. In 2013, Holt was a co-presenter of TV One series Best Bits. In 2015, Holt appeared in one episode as "Olivia Banes" on Shortland Street. In January 2018, Holt began co-hosting Breakfast with Jack Tame. In 2019, her interview with Jordan Peterson received a lot of attention as Holt expressed happiness at not having had children in her 20s and 30s. She left Breakfast in August 2020 to move to sports presentation on 1News at 6pm.

== Boxing career ==
Holt has had two corporate boxing bouts, both in 2011, and both won by decision to raise funds for charity. One of her opponents was pro surfer, Paige Hareb. As part of her preparation, Holt trained at the boxing gym Boxing Alley in Auckland, New Zealand.

== Political aspiration ==
At the 2017 general election Holt stood for the Green Party of Aotearoa New Zealand in the Helensville electorate held by retiring former Prime Minister John Key. She failed to be elected either for the Helensville seat or from her 14th placing on the party list.

== Personal life ==
In 2020, Holt conceived a child with her friend Josh Tito, who is ten years her junior and is of Māori descent. She announced in January 2020 that she was pregnant with their first child. On 8 May 2020 it was announced that their son had died at about 7 months' gestation. Following the loss of their son, Holt and Tito began a relationship. She experienced a miscarriage the following year. Holt gave birth to their second son in July 2022. The couple got engaged on 24 December 2022. In May 2024, she gave birth to another son.

Holt has spoken publicly about her experience with alcohol addiction, sobriety, and her ADHD diagnosis.

== Bibliography ==
Holt, Hayley (2023). Second Chances: Facing My Demons And Finding A Better Me. HarperCollins Publishers LLC. ISBN 9781038727671

== See also ==
- List of New Zealand television personalities
