= Dancing with the Stars =

International celebrity talent show franchise

- International logo of Dancing with the Stars
- Created by: Fenia Vardanis; Richard Hopkins; Karen Smith
- Original work: Strictly Come Dancing (United Kingdom)
- Years: 2005–present

Films and television
- Television series: Strictly Come Dancing, Dancing with the Stars, etc, (independent international versions, see below)

Miscellaneous
- Genre: Dance
- First aired: 15 May 2004; 22 years ago
- Distributor: BBC Studios
- Based on: Come Dancing by Eric Morley

Dancing with the Stars is an international television franchise based on the format of the British television series Strictly Come Dancing, itself a successor to the show Come Dancing (1950–1998). It is distributed by BBC Studios, the commercial arm of the BBC. As of 2012, the format has been licensed to 60 territories.

Versions have also been produced in dozens of countries across the world. As a result, the series became the world's most popular television programme among all genres in 2006 and 2007, according to the magazine Television Business International, reaching the Top 10 in 17 countries.

The show pairs a number of well known celebrities with professional ballroom dancers, who each week compete by performing one or more choreographed routines that follow the prearranged theme for that particular week. The dancers are then scored by a panel of judges. Viewers are given a certain amount of time to place votes for their favorite dancers, either by telephone or (in some countries) online. The couple with the lowest combined score provided by the judges and viewers is eliminated. This process continues until there are only two, three, four, or five couples left; when they have competed for the last time one couple is declared the champion and wins a trophy.

== International versions ==
Original version
Currently airing
Upcoming season
Status unknown
No longer airing
Season was planned to air despite COVID-19 restrictions

| Country/region | Local title | Network | Winners (celebrity and professional) | Judges | Presenters |
|---|---|---|---|---|---|
| Albania; Kosovo | Dancing with the Stars | Vizion Plus (1–7); Top Channel (8–9) | Season 1, 2010: Oni Pustina & Linda Poda; Season 2, 2011: Enver Petrovci & Lori Bala; Season 3, 2012: Elvana Gjata & Gerdi Vaso; Season 4, 2013–14: Lori Hoxha & Dion Gjinika; Season 5, 2014–15: Tuna & Simone Pigliacelli; Season 6, 2015: Dorina Mema & Besi; Season 7, 2018: Soni Malaj & Dion Gjinika; Season 8, 2022–23: Sara Hoxha & Luixhino Hala; Season 9, 2023: Enxhi Nasufi & Silvester Shuta | Arian Çani (1–2); Iva Tiço (1–4); Milaim Zeka (5); Alfred Kaçinari (3–7); Ema Andrea (4–7); Julian Deda (7); Armand Peza (8); Dalina Buzi (8); Kledi Kadiu (8); Valbona Selimllari (8–9); Ilir Shaqiri (1–7, 9); Lori Bala (9); Olta Gixhari (9) | Alketa Vejsiu (1); Genti Zotaj (1); Ermal Mamaqi (2–3); Armina Mevlani (4); Jonida Maliqi (4); Drini Zeqo (5); Amarda Toska (2–3, 5–6); Mateo Cela (6); Rudi Hizmo (6–7); Almeda Abazi (7); Bora Zemani (8–9); Eno Popi (8–9) |
| Arab World | Dancing With Stars Bel Araby | Abu Dhabi TV | Season 1, 2020: Souhila Mâallem & Hamed Sami | Wassim Maghnieh; Abdallah Mahmoud; Hassan Yassin; Ahmad Khalid; Waleed Zaki; Mazen Kiwan | Mansour Hamdan; Abdelaziz Saleh |
| Argentina | Bailando por un Sueño | El Trece | Season 1, Spring 2006: Carmen Barbieri & Christian Ponce; Season 2, Summer 2006: Florencia de la V & Manuel Rodríguez; Season 3, Fall 2006: Carla Conte & Guillermo Conforte; Season 4, 2007: Celina Rucci & Matías Sayago; Season 5, 2008: Carolina Ardohain & Nicolás Armengol; Season 6, 2010: Fabio Moli & Mariana Conci; Season 7, 2011: Hernán Piquín & Noelia Pompa; Season 8, 2012: Hernán Piquín & Noelia Pompa; Season 9, 2014: Anita Martínez & Bicho Gómez; Season 10, 2015: Federico Bal & Laurita Fernández; Season 11, 2016: Pedro Alfonso & Florencia Vigna; Season 12, 2017: Florencia Vigna & Gonzalo Gerber; Season 13, 2018: Julián Serrano & Sofía Morandi; Season 14, 2019: Nicolás Occhiato & Florencia Jazmín Peña; Season 15, 2021: Noelia Marzol & Jonathan Lazarte; Season 16, 2023: Fiorella Acosta & Sandro Leone | Current; Ángel de Brito (10–); Carolina Ardohain (10–12, 14–); Jimena Barón (15–); Hernán Piquín (15–); Former; Marcelo Polino (7–14); Florencia Peña (13–14); Laura Fernández (13); Moria Casán (3–12); Soledad Silveyra (9–11); Nacha Guevara (9–10); Carmen Barbieri (2, 5–8); Aníbal Pachano (6–8); Flavio Mendoza (7–8); Antonio Gasalla (8); Graciela Alfano (4, 6–7); Ricardo Fort (6); Reina Reech (1, 3, 6); Gerardo Sofovich (3–5); Jorge Lafauci (1–5); Laura Fidalgo (1–2); Zulma Faiad (1–2) | Marcelo Tinelli |
| Argentina | Bailando Kids | El Trece | Season 1, 2009: Pedro Maurizi & Candela Rodríguez | Laura Fidalgo; Carmen Barbieri; Reina Reech; Miguel Ángel Cherutti | Marcelo Tinelli; José María Listorti |
| Armenia | Parahandes (Պարահանդես) | Shant TV | Season 1, 2011: Emma Manukyan & Armen; Season 2, 2011–2012: Janna Hovakimyan & Petros; Season 3, 2013: Sandukht Matevosyan & Harut; Season 4, 2014: Gevorg Harutyunyan & Shushan; Season 5, 2014–2015: | Rudolf Kharatyan (1); Levon Vermishyan (1); Hrach Badalyan (2); Kristine Hovakimyan (3–4); Varduhi Aleksanyan (1–5); Gagik Karapetyan (1–5); Gevorg Markosyan (2–3, 5); Sergey Danielyan (3–5) | |
| Australia | Dancing with the Stars | Current; Seven Network (1–15, 18–); Former; Network 10 (16–17) | Season 1, 2004: Bec Cartwright & Michael Miziner; Season 2, 2005: Tom Williams & Kym Johnson; Season 3, 2005: Ada Nicodemou & Aric Yegudkin; Season 4, 2006: Grant Denyer & Amanda Garner; Season 5, 2006: Anthony Koutoufides & Natalie Lowe; Season 6, 2007: Kate Ceberano & John-Paul Collins; Season 7, 2007: Bridie Carter & Craig Monley; Season 8, 2008: Luke Jacobz & Luda Kroiter; Season 9, 2009: Adam Brand & Jade Hatcher; Season 10, 2010: Rob Palmer & Alana Patience; Season 11, 2011: Manu Feildel & Alana Patience; Season 12, 2012: Johnny Ruffo & Luda Kroitor; Season 13, 2013: Cosentino & Jessica Raffa; Season 14, 2014: David Rodan & Melanie Hooper; Season 15, 2015: Emma Freedman & Aric Yegudkin; Season 16, 2019: Samuel Johnson & Jorja Freeman; Season 17, 2020: Celia Pacquola & Jarryd Byrne; Season 18, 2021: Luke Jacobz & Jorja Freeman; Season 19, 2022: Grant Denyer & Lily Cornish; Season 20, 2023: Phil Burton & Ash-Leigh Hunter; Season 21, 2024: Lisa McCune & Ian Waite; Season 22, 2025: Kyle Shilling & Lily Cornish | Current; Helen Richey (1–15, 18–19, 21–); Mark Wilson (1–10, 18–); Craig Revel Horwood (16–17, 20–); Sharna Burgess (16–17, 20–); Former; Joshua Horner (11–12); Adam Garcia (13–14); Kym Johnson (13–15); Tristan MacManus (16–17); Paul Mercurio (1–7, 18–19); Todd McKenney (1–15, 18–20) | Current; Sonia Kruger (1–11, 18–); Chris Brown (21–); Former; Mel B (12); Daniel MacPherson (8–14); Edwina Bartholomew (13–15); Shane Bourne(15); Grant Denyer (16–17); Amanda Keller (16–17); Daryl Somers (1–7, 18–20) |
| Austria | Dancing Stars | ORF1 | Season 1, 2005: Marika Lichter & Andy Kainz; Season 2, 2006: Manuel Ortega & Kelly Kainz; Season 3, 2007: Klaus Eberhartinger & Kelly Kainz; Season 4, 2008: Dorian Steidl & Nicole Kuntner; Season 5, 2009: Claudia Reiterer & Andy Kainz; Season 6, 2011: Astrid Wirtenberger & Balazs Ekker; Season 7, 2012: Petra Frey & Vadim Garbuzov; Season 8, 2013: Rainer Schönfelder & Manuela Stöckl; Season 9, 2014: Roxanne Rapp & Vadim Garbuzov; Season 10, 2016: Verena Scheitz & Florian Gschaider; Season 11, 2017: Martin Ferdiny & Maria Santner; Season 12, 2019: Elisabeth Görgl & Thomas Kraml; Season 13, 2020: Michaela Kirchgasser & Vadim Garbuzov; Season 14, 2021: Caroline Athanasiadis & Danilo Campisi; Season 15, 2023: Missy May & Dimitar Stefanin; Season 16, 2025: Aaron Karl & Kateryna Mizera | Current; Balázs Ekker (7–); Maria Angelini-Santner (14–); Former; Dagmar Koller (1); Harald Serafin (2); Guggi Löwinger (3); Alfons Haider (4); Klaus Eberhartinger (5); Thomas Schäfer-Elmayer (1–10); Hannes Nedbal (1–10); Nicole Hansen (1–13); Dirk Heidemann (11–13); Karina Sarkissova (11–14) | Current; Mirjam Weichselbraun (1–12, 14–); Andi Knoll (15–); Former; Alfons Haider (1–3, 5); Klaus Eberhartinger (4, 6–13); Kristina Inhof (13); Norbert Oberhauser (14) |
| Belgium | Sterren op de Dansvloer | VTM | Season 1, 2006: Dina Tersago & Wim Gevaert; Season 2, 2007: Pieter Loridon & Daisy Croes; Season 3, 2008: Antony Arandia & Leila Akcelik; Season 4, 2009: Louis Talpe & Leila Akcelik; Season 5, 2012: Kevin van der Perren & Charissa van Dipte | Davy Brocatus (Seasons 1–5); Ronny Daelemans (Seasons 1–5); Dina Tersago (Season 5); Euvgenia Parakhina (Season 5); Anouchka Balsing (Seasons 1–4); Jan Geerts (Seasons 1–4) | Jacques Vermeire (Seasons 1–4); Francesca Vanthielen (Seasons 1–5); Kürt Rogiers (Season 5) |
| Belgium | Dancing with the Stars | Play4 | Season 1, 2018: James Cooke & Björk Gunnarsdóttir; Season 2, 2019: Julie Vermeire & Pasquale La Rocca; Season 3, 2021: Nina Derwael & Simone Arena | Joanna Leunis; Jan Kooijman Michel Froget (Season 1); Leah Thys (Season 1); Sam Louwyck (Season 2); Davy Brocatus (Season 2); Wim Vanlessen (Season 3); Joffrey Anane (Season 3) | Gert Verhulst Jani Kazaltzis (Season 1); Katrin Kerkhofs (Season 2–3) |
| Belgium | Dancing with the Stars | VTM | Season 1, 2025: Upcoming Season | | Current Jonas Van Geel; Peter Van Den Begin |
| Brazil | Dança dos Famosos (UK format) | TV Globo | Season 1, 2005: Karina Bacchi & Fabiano Vivas; Season 2, 2006: Juliana Didone & Leandro Azevedo; Season 3, 2006: Robson Caetano & Ivonete Liberatto; Season 4, 2007: Rodrigo Hilbert & Priscila Amaral; Season 5, 2008: Christiane Torloni & Alvaro Reis; Season 6, 2009: Paola Oliveira & Atila Amaral; Season 7, 2010: Fernanda Souza & Alexandre Porcel; Season 8, 2011: Miguel Roncato & Ana Flavia Simoes; Season 9, 2012: Rodrigo Simas & Raquel Guarini; Season 10, 2013: Carol Castro & Leandro Azevedo; Season 11, 2014: Marcello Melo Jr. & Raquel Guarini; Season 12, 2015: Viviane Araújo & Marcelo Granjeiro; Season 13, 2016: Felipe Simas & Carol Agnelo; Season 14, 2017: Maria Joana & Reginaldo Sama; Season 15, 2018: Léo Jaime & Larissa Parison; Season 16, 2019: Kaysar Dadour & Mayara Araújo; Season 17, 2020: Lucy Ramos & Reginaldo Sama; Season 18, 2021: Paola Oliveira & Leandro Azevedo; Season 19, 2022: Vitória Strada & Wagner Santos; Season 20, 2023: Priscila Fantin & Rolon Hô; Season 21, 2024: Tati Machado & Diego Maia; Season 22, 2025 Silvero Pereira & Thais Souza | Current; Ana Botafogo; Carlinhos de Jesus; Zebrina; Guest judges Former; Five per week (no fixed jury) | Current; Luciano Huck (Season 19); Former; Fausto Silva (Seasons 1–18); Tiago Leifert (Season 18; weeks 5–16) |
| Brazil | Dancinha dos Famosos (formerly Dança das Crianças) (Kids version) | TV Globo | Season 1, 2007: João Vitor Silva & Juliane Dias; Season 2, 2008: Eduardo Melo & Gabriela Bogo; Season 3, 2009: Nauhana Costa & Thaian Marques; Season 4, 2015: Mel Maia & Wesley Monteiro; Season 5, 2017: Xande Valois & Duda Almeida | Three per week (no fixed jury) | Fausto Silva |
| Brazil | Dancing Brasil (U.S. format) | RecordTV | Season 1, 2017: Maytê Piragibe & Paulo Victor Souza; Season 2, 2017: Yudi Tamashiro & Barbara Guerra; Season 3, 2018: Geovanna Tominaga & Lucas Teodoro; Season 4, 2018: Pérola Faria & Fernando Perrotti; Season 5, 2019: D'Black & Carol Dias | Jaime Arôxa; Fernanda Chammy; Paulo Goulart Filho | Xuxa Meneghel; Junno Andrade (Season 4–present); Sérgio Marone (Season 1–2); Leandro Lima (Season 3) |
| Brazil | Dancing Brasil Júnior (Kids version) | RecordTV | Season 1, 2018: Leonardo Oliveira & Yasmim Nascimento | Jaime Arôxa; Fernanda Chammy; Paulo Goulart Filho | Xuxa Meneghel; Jean Paulo Campos |
| Bulgaria | Dancing Stars (US format) | bTV (Season 1–2, 5); NOVA (Season 3–4) | Season 1, 2008: Orlin Pavlov & Yana Akimova; Season 2, 2009: Bianka Panova & Svetoslav Vasilev; Season 3, 2013: Angel Kovachev & Dorina Stoyanova; Season 4, 2014: Albena Denkova & Kaloyan Ivanov; Season 5, 2024: Nedelya Shtonova & Atanas Mesetchkov | Galena Velikova (Seasons 1, 3–5); Vladimir Bozhilov (Season 1); Neshka Robeva (Season 1); Iliana Raeva (Seasons 2–5); Maria Gigova (Season 2); Pambous Agapiu (Season 2); Vera Marinova (Season 2); Alfredo Torres (Seasons 3–4); Kalin Sarmenov (Season 3); Hristo Mutafchiev (Season 4); Frantsiska Yordanova - Papkala (Season 5); Tomash Papkala (Season 5) | Radost Draganova (Season 1); Todor Kolev (Season 1); Elena Petrova (Season 2); Dimitar Pavlov (Season 2); Aleksandra Sarchadjieva (Seasons 3–4); Krasimir Rankov (Season 3); Nikol Stankulova (Season 3); Kalin Sarmenov (Season 4); Magi Zhelyaskova (Season 4); Aleksandra Raeva (Season 5); Krasimir Radkov (Season 5); Stanislava Gancheva (Season 5) |
| Bulgaria | VIP Dance (UK format) | NOVA | Season 1, 2009: Raina, Fahradin Fahradinov, Sashka Dimitrova and Svetlin Dimitrov | Neshka Robeva; Galena Velikova; Orlin Pavlov; Ivaylo Manolov | Ivan Hristov; Andrey Arnaudov |
| Chile | El Baile en TVN | TVN | Season 1, 2006: Juvenal Olmos & Claudia Miranda; Season 2, Spring 2007: Cristián Arriagada & Paz Bustos; Season 3, Fall 2007: Francisco Reyes Morandé & Irene Bustamante; Season 4, 2008: Fernando Godoy & Paz Bustos | Claudia Miranda (Season 2,4); Georgette Farías (Seasons 3–4); Jose Luis Tejo (Seasons 3–4); Sergio Valero (Seasons 1–4); Sara Nieto (Seasons 1–2); Mey Santamaría (Seasons 1); William Geisse (Seasons 1–3) | Rafael Araneda (Seasons 1–4); Karen Doggenweiler (Seasons 1–4) |
| China | 舞动奇迹; Strictly Come Dancing China (1–3) 與星共舞; Dancing with the Stars (4) | Hunan TV & TVB (Season 1–2); Hunan TV (Season 3); Dragon TV (Season 4) | Season 1, 2007: Li Yuchun; Season 2, 2008: Su Xin & Jason Zhang; Season 3, 2011: Jin Chen & Li Nuoyi; Season 4, 2014–2015: | Yang yang (Seasons 1–3); Zhou Zhikun (Seasons 1–3); Sheng Peiyi (Seasons 1–3) | Yang Lele (Season 3); He Jiong (Season 3) |
| Colombia | Bailando por un Sueño; Web Oficial | RCN | Season 1, 2006: Maria Cecilia Sánchez & Jose Andulfo Leal Garay; Season 2, 2006: Carolina Cruz & Wilber González; Season 3, 2006: Valentina Rendón & Felipe Hurtado | Nerú Martínez; Thereusse Leleux; Carlos Muñoz; Rosanna Lignarolo | Paola Turbay; Julián Román |
| Colombia | Bailando con las Estrellas | RCN | Season 1, 2016: Debi Nova | Fernando Montaño; Niina Shablinskaja; Alberto "Beto" Pérez | Patrick Delmas; Taliana Vargas |
| Costa Rica | Dancing With The Stars | Teletica | Season 1, 2014: Alex Costa & Alhanna Morales; Season 2, 2015: Renzo Rímolo & Yessenia Reyes; Season 3, 2016: Daniel Vargas & Lucía Jiménez; Season 4, 2017: Víctor Carvajal & Diana de la O Season 5, 2018: Johanna Solano & Kevin Vera; Season 6, 2019: Sofía Chaverri & Javier Acuña; Season 7, 2022: Lorna Cepeda & Michael Rubí | David Martínez; Flor Urbina (Seasons 1–6); César Meléndez (Seasons 1–2); Alex Costa (Seasons 3–present); Silvia Baltodano (Seasons 7–present) | Randall Vargas; Shirley Álvarez; Boris Sosa (Season 2); Mauricio Hoffmann (Season 3); Bismarck Méndez (Season 4–5) Natalia Carvajal (Season 6); María Rodríguez (Season 7) |
| Croatia | Ples sa zvijezdama | HRT1 (2006–13); Nova TV (2019, 2022–2023) | Season 1, 2006: Zrinka Cvitešić & Nicolas Quesnoit; Season 2, 2007: Luka Nižetić & Mirjana Žutić; Season 3, 2008: Mario Valentić & Ana Herceg; Season 4, 2009: Franka Batelić & Ištvan Varga; Season 5, 2010: Nera Stipičević & Damir Horvatinčić; Season 6, 2011: Marko Tolja & Ana Herceg; Season 7, 2012: Barbara Radulović & Robert Schubert; Season 8, 2013: Mislav Čavajda & Petra Jeričević; Season 9, 2019: Slavko Sobin & Gabriela Pilić; Season 10, 2022: Pedro Soltz & Valentina Walme; Season 11, 2023: Marco Cuccurin & Paula Tonković | Dinko Bogdanić(Seasons 1–9); Milka Babović (Seasons 1–8); Elio Bašan (Seasons 1–8); Davor Bilman (Seasons 1–8); Tamara Despot (Season 9); Nicolas Quesnoit (Season 9); Almira Osmanović (Season 9); Marko Ciboci (Season 10–11); Larisa Lipovec Navojec (Season 10–11); Igor Barberić (Season 10–11); Franka Batelić (Season 10–11) | Duško Čurlić (Seasons 1–8); Barbara Kolar (Season 1–8); Mia Kovačić (Season 9); Janko Popović Volarić (Season 9); Igor Mešin (Season 10–11); Maja Šuput (Season 10); Tamara Loos (Season 11) |
| Czech Republic | StarDance | Czech Television | Season 1, 2006: Roman Vojtek & Kristýna Coufalová; Season 2, 2007: Aleš Valenta & Iva Langerová; Season 3, 2008: Dana Batulková & Jan Onder; Season 4, 2010: Pavel Kříž & Alice Stodůlková; Season 5, 2012: Kateřina Baďurová & Jan Onder; Season 6, 2013: Anna Polívková & Michal Kurtiš; Season 7, 2015: Marie Doležalová & Marek Zelinka; Season 8, 2016: Zdeněk Piškula & Veronika Lálová; Season 9, 2018: Jiří Dvořák & Lenka Nora Návorková; Season 10, 2019: Veronika Khek Kubařová & Dominik Vodička; Season 11, 2021: Jan Cina & Adriana Mašková; Season 12, 2023: Darija Pavlovičová & Dominik Vodička; Season 13, 2024: Oskar Hes & Kateřina Bartuněk Hrstková | Current; Tatiana Drexler (Seasons 2–present); Richard Genzer (Seasons 10–present) Zdeněk Chlopčík (Seasons 1–12, 14) Jana Burkevičová (Season 14); Former; Václav Kuneš (Season 9); Radek Balaš (Seasons 6–9); Jan Révai (Seasons 5–8); Eva Bartuňková (Seasons 1, 5); Petra Tirpák Kostovčíková (Season 4); Petr Zuska (Season 4); Leona Kvasnicová (Season 3); Jaroslav Kuneš (Season 3); Mahulena Bočanová (Season 2); Richard Hes (Season 2); Michael Kocáb (Season 1); Vlastimil Harapes (Season 1) Jan Tománek (Seasons 10–11, 13) | Tereza Kostková (Seasons 1–present); Marek Eben (Seasons 1–present) |
| Denmark | Vild med dans | TV 2 | Season 1, 2005: Mia Lyhne & Thomas Evers Poulsen; Season 2, 2005: David Owe & Vickie Jo Ringgaard; Season 3, 2006: Christina Roslyng & Steen Lund; Season 4, 2007: Robert Hansen & Marianne Eihilt; Season 5, 2008: Joachim B. Olsen & Marianne Eihilt; Season 6, 2009: Casper Elgaard & Vickie Jo Ringgaard; Season 7, 2010: Cecilie Hother & Mads Vad; Season 8, 2011: Sophie Fjellvang-Sølling & Silas Holst; Season 9, 2012: Joakim Ingversen & Claudia Rex; Season 10, 2013: Mie Skov & Mads Vad; Season 11, 2014: Sara Maria Franch Mærkedahl & Silas Holst; Season 12, 2015: Ena Spottag & Thomas Evers Poulsen; Season 13, 2016: Sarah Mahfoud & Morten Kjeldgaard; Season 14, 2017: Sofie Lassen-Kahlke & Michael Olesen; Season 15, 2018: Simon Stenspil & Asta Bjórk Ivarsdottir; Season 16, 2019: Jakob Fauerby & Silas Holst; Season 17, 2020: Merete Mærkedahl & Thomas Evers Poulsen; Season 18, 2021: Jimilian & Asta Björk Ivarsdottir; Season 19, 2022: Caspar Phillipson & Malene Østergaard; Season 20, 2023: Kasper Fisker & Karina Frimodt; Season 21, 2024: Anna Munch & Eugen Miu; Season 22, 2025: Jasmind Lind & Michael Olesen | Marianne Eihilt (Seasons 16–22); Lene James Mikkelsen (Seasons 21–22); Sonny Fredie Pedersen (Seasons 19–22); Anne Laxholm (Seasons 1–20); Jens Werner (Seasons 1–19); Britt Bendixen (Seasons 1–18); Kim Dahl (Seasons 1); Thomas Evers Poulsen (Seasons 2); Allan Tornsberg (Seasons 3–7); Nikolaj Hübbe (Seasons 8–20) | Cilia Trappaud (Seasons 21–22); Martin Johannes Larsen (Seasons 19–22); Peter Hansen (Seasons 1–2); Andrea Elisabeth Rudolph (Seasons 1–2 & Seasons 4–6); Claus Elming (Seasons 3–14); Sarah Grünewald (Seasons 10–20); Christine Lorentzen (Seasons 3); Christiane Schaumburg-Müller (Seasons 7–9, 15–18) |
| Estonia | Tantsud tähtedega | Kanal 2 (2006–2011); TV3 (2022–) | Season 1, 2006: Mikk Saar & Olga Kosmina; Season 2, 2007: Koit Toome & Kertuu Tänav; Season 3, 2008: Argo Ader & Helena Liiv; Season 4, 2010: Liina Vahter & Mairold Millert; Season 5, 2011: Jan Uuspõld & Aleksandra Žeregelja; Season 6, 2022: Ülle Lichtfeldt & Marko Mehine | Current; Jüri Nael (Seasons 1–2, 4–); Helen Klandorf-Sadam (Season 6–); Tanja Mihhailova-Saar (Season 6–); Martin Parmas (Season 6–); Former; Merle Klandorf (Seasons 1–5); Ants Tael (Seasons 1–4); Kaie Kõrb (Seasons 1–3); Riina Suhhotskaja (Season 3); Märt Agu (Season 3) | Current; Jüri Pootsmann (Season 6–); Eda-Ines Etti (Season 6–); Former; Mart Sander (Seasons 1–5); Liina Randpere (Season 5); Kristiina Heinmets-Aigro (Season 1); Merle Liivak (Season 2); Gerli Padar (Season 3); Kaisa Oja (Season 4) |
| Finland | Tanssii tähtien kanssa | MTV3 | Season 1, 2006: Tomi Metsäketo & Sanna Hirvaskari; Season 2, 2007: Mariko Pajalahti & Aleksi Seppänen; Season 3, 2008: Maria Lund & Mikko Ahti; Season 4, 2009: Satu Tuomisto & Janne Talasma; Season 5, 2010: Antti Tuisku & Anna-Liisa Bergström; Season 6, 2011: Viivi Pumpanen & Matti Puro; Season 7, 2012: Krisse Salminen & Matti Puro; Season 8, 2013: Raakel Lignell & Jani Rasimus; Season 9, 2014: Pete Parkkonen & Katri Mäkinen; Season 10, 2017: Anna-Maija Tuokko & Matti Puro; Season 11, 2018: Edis Tatli & Katri Mäkinen; Season 12, 2019: Christoffer Strandberg & Jutta Helenius; Season 13, 2020: Virpi Sarasvuo & Sami Helenius; Season 14, 2021: Ernest Lawson & Anniina Koivuniemi; Season 15, 2022: Benjamin & Saana Akiola; Season 16, 2023: Pernilla Böckerman & Anssi Heikkilä; Season 17, 2024: Linnea Leino & Anssi Heikkilä; Season 18, 2025: Johannes Holopainen & Katri Riihilahti; Season 19, 2026: Matti Leino & Kia Lehmuskoski | Current; Jukka Haapalainen (Seasons 1–present); Jorma Uotinen (Seasons 1–present); Helena Ahti-Hallberg (Seasons 3–8, 10–present) Former; Merja Satulehto (Seasons 1–2); Mikko Rasila (Seasons 1–2); Johanna Rusanen (Season 3); Susanna Rahkamo (Season 4); Jone Nikula (Season 5); Anna Abreu (Season 6); Riku Nieminen (Season 7); Jenni Paaskysaari (Season 8); Krisse Salminen (Season 9); Kiira Korpi (Seasons 10) | Current; Vappu Pimiä (Seasons 4–6 & 8–present); Ernest Lawson (Seasons 15-present); Former; Marco Bjurström (Seasons 1–4); Vanessa Kurri (Seasons 3); Ella Kanninen (Seasons 1–2 & Season 7); Mikko Leppilampi (Seasons 5–14) |
| France | Danse avec les stars | TF1 | Season 1, Early 2011: Matt Pokora & Katrina Patchett; Season 2, Fall 2011: Shy'm & Maxime Dereymez; Season 3, 2012: Emmanuel Moire & Fauve Hautot; Christmas Special, 2012: Amel Bent & Christophe Licata; Season 4, 2013: Alizée & Gregoire Lyonnet; Season 5, 2014: Rayane Bensetti & Denitsa Ikonomova; Season 6, 2015: Loïc Nottet & Denitsa Ikonomova; Season 7, 2016: Laurent Maistret & Denitsa Ikonomova; Season 8, 2017: Agustín Galiana & Candice Pascal; Season 9, 2018: Clément Rémiens & Denitsa Ikonomova; Season 10, 2019: Sami El Gueddari & Fauve Hautot; Season 11, 2021: Tayc & Fauve Hautot; Season 12, 2022: Billy Crawford & Fauve Hautot; Season 13, 2024: Natasha St-Pier & Anthony Colette; Season 14, 2025: Lénie Vacher & Jordan Mouillerac; Season 15, 2026⁚ Samuel Bambi & Ana Riera | Current; Chris Marques (Seasons 1–present); Jean-Marc Généreux (Seasons 1–10, 13-present); Fauve Hautot (Seasons 6–8, 13-present); Mel Charlot (Season 13-present) Former; Alessandra Martines (Seasons 1–2); Matt Pokora (Season 5); Marie-Claude Pietragalla (Seasons 3–7); Nico Archambault (Season 8); Patrick Dupond (Seasons 9–10); Shy'm (Seasons 3–4; 9–10); Jean Paul Gaultier (Season 11); Denitsa Ikonomova (Season 11); François Alu (Seasons 11-12); Bilal Hassani (Season 12); Marie-Agnès Gillot (Season 12) | Current; Camille Combal (Seasons 9–present); Former; Vincent Cerutti (Seasons 1–5); Laurent Ournac (Seasons 6–7); Sandrine Quétier (Seasons 1–8); Karine Ferri (Seasons 9–11) |
| France | Danse avec les stars d'internet | TF1+ Twitch | Season 1, 2024: Domingo & Inès Vandamme Season 2, 2025 : Upcoming Season | Chris Marques; Jean-Marc Généreux; Fauve Hautot; Mel Charlot | Michou; Doigby |
| Georgia | ცეკვავენ ვარსკვლავები Tsekvaven Varskvlavebi | Imedi TV | Season 1, 2012: Samori Balde & Lika Labadze; Season 2, 2012: Ruska Mayashvili & Oto Poladashvili; Season 3, 2013: Keti Khatiashvili & Giorgi Barbakadze; Season 4, 2014: Mariam Kublashvili & Victor Burchuladze; Season 5, 2014: Zura Manjavidze & Mzia Orvelashvili; Season 6, 2016: Stanislav Bondarenko & Nike Keshelava; Season 7, 2017: Giorgi Bakhutashvili & Juliana Bargnari; Season 8, 2018: Amiko Chokharadze & Juliana Bargnari; Season 9, 2020: Anka Vasadze & Oto Poladashvili; Season 10, 2021: Salome Pazhava & Rati Gachechiladze; Season 11, 2022–23: Babi Kirkitadze & Erekle Girgvliani | Current; Gocha Chertkoev (Seasons 1–present); Sofo Shevardnadze (Seasons 3–present); Nino Sukhishvili (Seasons 1,3,5–present); Former; Levan Uchaneishvili (Season 1); Nino Ananiashvili (Season 1); Nanuka Zhorzholiani (Season 1–2); Nino Surguladze (Season 2); Ia Parulava (Season 2); Gota Kursuladze (Season 2); Marina Beridze (Season 2); Nikolay Tsiskaridze (Season 3); Otar Tatishvili (Season 3); Inga Grigorieva (Season 4); Levan Tsuladze (Season 4) | Ruska Makashvili (Season 1); Tiko Sadunishvili (Season 2); Nanka Kalatozishvili(Seasons 3–6); Duta Skhirtladze (Seasons 3–5; in Season 6 Participate); Giorgi kifshidze (Series 4); Manika Asatiani Ekaterine Amirejibi |
| Germany | Let's Dance | RTL | Season 1, 2006: Wayne Carpendale & Isabel Edvardsson; Season 2, 2007: Susan Sideropoulos & Christian Polanc; Season 3, 2010: Sophia Thomalla & Massimo Sinató; Season 4, 2011: Maite Kelly & Christian Polanc; Season 5, 2012: Magdalena Brzeska & Erich Klann; Season 6, 2013: Manuel Cortez & Melissa Ortiz Gomez; Season 7, 2014: Alexander Klaws & Isabel Edvardsson; Season 8, 2015: Hans Sarpei & Kathrin Menzinger; Season 9, 2016: Victoria Swarovski & Erich Klann; Season 10, 2017: Gil Ofarim & Ekaterina Leonova; Season 11, 2018: Ingolf Lück & Ekaterina Leonova; Season 12, 2019: Pascal Hens & Ekaterina Leonova; Season 13, 2020: Lili Paul-Roncalli & Massimo Sinató; Season 14, 2021: Rúrik Gíslason & Renata Lusin; Season 15, 2022: René Casselly & Kathrin Menzinger; Season 16, 2023: Anna Ermakova & Valentin Lusin; Season 17, 2024: Gabriel Kelly & Malika Dzumaev; Season 18, 2025: Diego Pooth & Ekaterina Leonova; Season 19, 2026: Anna-Carina Woitschack & Evgeny Vinokurov | Current; Joachim Llambi (Seasons 1–present); Motsi Mabuse (seasons 4–present); Jorge González (Seasons 6–present); Former; Roman Frieling (Seasons 4–5); Maite Kelly (Season 5); Harald Glööckler (Seasons 3–4); Peter Kraus (Season 3); Isabel Edvardsson (Season 3); Markus Schöffl (Seasons 1–2); Michael Hull (Seasons 1–2); Ute Lemper (Season 2); Katarina Witt (Season 1) | Current; Daniel Hartwich (Seasons 3–present); Victoria Swarovski (Seasons 11–present); Former; Hape Kerkeling (Seasons 1–2); Nazan Eckes (Seasons 1–3); Sylvie Meis (Seasons 4–10) |
| Germany | Let's Dance – Kids | TVNOW (stream); RTL (television); Super RTL (Upcoming) | Season 1, 2021: Jona Szewczenko & Tizio Tiago Domingues da Silva | Joachim Llambi; Motsi Mabuse; Jorge González | Daniel Hartwich; Victoria Swarovski |
| Greece | Dancing with the Stars | ANT1 (2010–2014, 2018); Star Channel (2021–2022) | Season 1, 2010: Errika Prezerakou & Thodoris Panagakos; Season 2, 2011: Argiris Aggelou & Emily Matthaiakaki; Season 3, 2012: Ntoretta Papadimitriou & Paulos Manogiannakis; Season 4, 2013: Isaias Matiamba & Maria Antimisari; Season 5, 2014: Morfoula Ntona & Richard Szilagyi; Season 6, 2018: Vangelis Kakouriotis & Nikoletta Mavridi; Season 7, 2021–22: Georgia Georgiou & Alexander Bachariev | Alexis Kostalas (Seasons 1–6); Giannis Latsios (Seasons 1–5); Fokas Evanggelinos (Seasons 1–3); Galena Velikova-Chaina (Seasons 1, 3–6); Errica Prezerakou (Season 2); Katia Dandoulaki (Seasons 3–5); Lakis Gavalas (Season 5); Eleonora Meleti (Season 6); Giorgos Liagkas (Season 4, Week 4 (Guest) / Season 6); Stefanos Dimoulas (Season 7); Marina Lampropoulou (Season 7); Elena Lizardou (Season 7); Jason Roditis (Season 7) | Zeta Makripoulia (Seasons 1–3); Doukissa Nomikou (Seasons 4–5); Evangelia Aravani (Season 6); Vicky Kaya (Season 7); Eleni Karpontini (Backstage, Season 1); Mairi Sinatsaki (Backstage, Season 2); Argiris Aggelou (Backstage, Season 3); Ntoretta Papadimitriou (Backstage, Season 4); Kostas Martakis (Backstage, Season 5); Savvas Poumpouras (Backstage, Season 6); Lambros Fisfis (Backstage, Season 7) |
| Hungary | Szombat esti láz | RTL Klub (2005–2008); RTL II (2013–2014) | Season 1, Spring 2006: Attila Czene & Petra Bánhidi; Season 2, Fall 2006: András Csonka & Andrea Keleti; Season 3, 2008: Attila Katus & Andrea Molnár; Season 4, 2013: Csaba Vastag & Tünde Mármarosi; Season 5, 2014: Judit Rezes & György Lehoczky | Lujza Pálinkó (2006–2008); Marcell Zsámboki (2006–2008); György Böhm (2006–2008); Ilona Medveczky (2006–2008); Andrea Keleti (2013–2014); Cecília Esztergályos (2013–2014); Tamás Szirtes (2013); Ákos Tihanyi (2013); András Csonka (2014); László Jáksó (2014) | Zsóka Kapócs (2006); András Stohl (2006); Nóra Ördög (2006–2008, 2014); Zoltán Bereczki (2008); András Csonka (2013); Lilu (2013) |
| Hungary | Dancing with the Stars | TV2 (2020–present) | Season 1, 2020: Tímea Gelencsér & Bertalan Hegyes; Season 2, 2021: Andi Tóth & Andrei Mangra; Season 3, 2022: Adél Csobot & Bertalan Hegyes; Season 4, 2023: Gábor Krausz & Anna Mikes; Season 5, 2024: Antal Strenner (WhisperTon) & Katica Tóth; Season 6, 2026: Upcoming season | Current; Nóra Ördög (2020–present); Vajk Szente (2022–present); Tamás Juronics (2022–present); Former; Miklós Schiffer (2020); Andrea Molnár (2020–2021); Gergely Csanád Kovács (2020–2021); Zoltán Bereczki (2021–2022) | Ramóna Kiss (2020–present); András Stohl (2020–present) |
| Iceland | Allir Geta Dansað | Stöð 2 | Season 1, 2018: Jóhanna Guðrún Jónsdóttir & Maxim Petrov | Selma BjörnsdóttirJóhann Gunnar Arnarsson; Karen Björk Reeve | Eva Laufey Kjaran Hermannsdóttir; Sigrún Ósk Kristjánsdóttir |
| India | Jhalak Dikhhla Jaa | SET (Seasons 1–4, 11—); Colors TV (Seasons 5–10) | Season 1, 2006: Mona Singh & Toby Fernandes; Season 2, 2008: Prachi Desai & Deepak Singh; Season 3, 2009: Baichung Bhutia & Sonia Zaffer; Season 4, 2011: Meiyang Chang & Marischa Fernandes; Season 5, 2012: Gurmeet Choudhary & Shampa Sonthalia; Season 6, 2013: Drashti Dhami & Salman Yusuff Khan; Season 7, 2014: Ashish Sharma & Shampa Sonthalia; Season 8, 2015: Faisal Khan & Vaishnavi; Season 9, 2016: Teriya Magar & Aryan Patra; Season 10, 2022: Gunjan Sinha & Tejas Verma; Season 11, 2023: Manisha Rani & Ashutosh Pawar | Farah Khan (Seasons 1, 9, 11—); Malaika Arora Khan (Seasons 4, 8, 11—); Arshad Warsi (Season 11—); Shilpa Shetty (Season 1); Sanjay Leela Bhansali (Season 1); Urmila Matondkar (Season 2); Jeetendra (Season 2); Shiamak Davar (Season 2); Juhi Chawla (Season 3); Saroj Khan (Season 3); Vaibhavi Merchant (Season 3); Remo D'Souza (Seasons 4–7); Maksim Chmerkovskiy (Season 7); Shahid Kapoor (Season 8); Lauren Gottlieb (Season 8); Ganesh Hegde (Seasons 8–9); Jacqueline Fernandez (Season 9); Madhuri Dixit (Seasons 4–7, 10); Karan Johar (Seasons 5—10); Nora Fatehi (Season 10) | Gauahar Khan (Season 11–); Rithvik Dhanjani (Season 11–); Parmeet Sethi (Season 1); Archana Puran Singh (Season 1); Rohit Roy (Seasons 2–3); Shweta Tiwari (Season 3); Shiv Panditt (Season 3); Mona Singh (Seasons 2, 4); Sumeet Raghavan (Season 4); Ragini Khanna (Season 5); Kapil Sharma (Season 6); Drashti Dhami (Season 7); Ranvir Shorey (Season 7); Manish Paul (Seasons 5–10) |
| Indonesia | Dancing with the Stars Indonesia | Indosiar | Season 1, 2011: Fadli & Trisna; Season 2, 2011: Lucky Widja & Sri | Marcellino Lefrandt; Ralf Lepehne (season 1); Mieke Amalia (season 1); Espen Salberg (season 2); Aline Adita (season 2) | Choky Sitohang; Cathy Sharon; Marissa Nasution |
| Ireland | Dancing with the Stars | RTÉ One | Series 1, 2017: Aidan O'Mahony & Valeria Milova; Series 2, 2018: Jake Carter & Karen Byrne; Series 3, 2019: Mairéad Ronan & John Nolan; Series 4, 2020: Lottie Ryan & Pasquale La Rocca; Series 5, 2022: Nina Carberry & Pasquale La Rocca; Series 6, 2023: Carl Mullan & Emily Barker; Series 7, 2024: Jason Smyth & Karen Byrne; Series 8, 2025: Rhys McClenaghan & Laura Nolan; Series 9, 2026: Katelyn Cummins & Leonardo Lini | Current; Brian Redmond; Arthur Gourounlian (Series 5–); Karen Byrne (Series 8–); Oti Mabuse(Series 9–); Former; Julian Benson (Series 1–4); Loraine Barry (Series 1–8) | Current; Jennifer Zamparelli (Series 3–); Doireann Garrihy (Series 6–); Former; Amanda Byram (Series 1–2); Nicky Byrne (Series 1–5) |
| Israel | רוקדים עם כוכבים; Rokdim Im Kokhavim | Channel 2 (1–7); Channel 12 (8–present) | Season 1, 2005: Eliana Bakeer & Oron Dahan; Season 2, 2006: Guy Arieli & Masha Troyanski; Season 3, 2007: Rodrigo Gonzales & Naama Tavori; Season 4, 2008: Galit Giat & Kiril Sivolapov; Season 5, 2010: Michael Lewis & Ana Aharonov; Season 6, 2011: Shlomi Koriat & Hadas Fisher; Season 7, 2012: Asaf Hertz & Masha Troyansky; Season 8, 2022: Alex Shatilov & Nina Solovyov; Season 9, 2023: Adi Havshush & Artem Liaskovski / Matanel Konevsky; Season 10, 2024: Dor Harari & Julia Shachar; Season 11, 2025: Amir Shurush & Sana Sokol; Season 12, 2026: Amir Banai & Romy Nof | Current; Eli Mizrahi (Seasons 1–); Ana Aharonov (Season 8–); Haim Pershtein (Season 12–); David Dvir (Season 8–); Former; Uri Paster (Season 7); Michal Amdurski (Season 7); Gavri Levi (Seasons 1–2, 4–5); Dana Parnes (Season 5); Amir Fay Guttman (Season 5); Claude Dadia (Seasons 1–4, Season 6); Gaby Aldor (Seasons 1–2); Sally-Anne Friedland (Season 3); Yossi Yungman (Season 3); Ilanit Tadmor (Season 4); Hanna Laslo (Season 6); Rona-Lee Shimon (Season 8–9); Leah Yanai (Season 10–11) | Current; Lucy Ayoub (Season 8–); Former; Avi Kushnir (Season 1–6); Hilla Nachshon (Season 1–6); Guy Zu-Aretz (Season 7); Yarden Harel (Season 7); Assi Azar (Season 9) |
| Italy | Ballando con le Stelle | Rai 1 | Season 1, 2005: Hoara Borselli & Simone Di Pasquale; Season 2, 2006: Cristina Chiabotto & Raimondo Todaro; Season 3, 2007: Fiona May & Raimondo Todaro; Season 4, 2008: Maria Elena Vandone & Samuel Peron; Season 5, 2009: Emanuele Filiberto & Natalia Titova; Season 6, 2010: Veronica Olivier & Raimondo Todaro; Season 7, 2011: Kaspar Capparoni & Yulia Musikhina; Season 8, 2012: Andres Gil & Anastasia Kuzmina; Season 9, 2013: Elisa Di Francisca & Raimondo Todaro; Season 10, 2014: Giusy Versace & Raimondo Todaro; Season 11, 2016: Iago García & Samanta Togni; Season 12, 2017: Oney Tapia & Veera Kinnunen; Season 13, 2018: Cesare Bocci & Alessandra Tripoli; Season 14, 2019: Lasse Matberg & Sara Di Vaira; Season 15, 2020: Gilles Rocca & Lucrezia Lando; Season 16, 2021: Arisa & Vito Coppola; Season 17, 2022: Luisella Costamagna & Pasquale La Rocca; Season 18, 2023: Wanda Nara & Pasquale La Rocca; Season 19, 2024: Bianca Guaccero & Giovanni Pernice; Season 20, 2025: Andrea Delogu & Nikita Perotti | Guillermo Mariotto (Seasons 1–); Ivan Zazzaroni (Season 3, 5–); Carolyn Smith (Seasons 4–); Barbara D'Urso (Seasons 21–); Alberto Matano (Seasons 21–); Fabio Canino (Seasons 4–20); Selvaggia Lucarelli (Season 11–20); Rafael Amargo (Seasons 9–10); Lamberto Sposini (Seasons 4–7); Amanda Lear (Seasons 1–2, 4); Lina Wertmüller (Season 3); Espen Salberg (Season 3); Heather Parisi (Seasons 1–2); Roberto Flemack (Seasons 1–2) | Milly Carlucci (Seasons 1–); Simone Di Pasquale (Seasons 21–); Paolo Belli (Seasons 1–19); Massimiliano Rosolino (Season 20) |
| Kazakhstan | Звёздные танцы Zvyozdnye tancy | Channel 7 | Season 1, 2012: Bayan Esentayeva & Euvgeni Moiseyev | Stanislav Popov (main judge) | Batyrzhan Tazabekov; Dylnaz Akhmadiyeva; Nartaz Adambayev |
| Latvia | Dejo ar zvaigzni! | TV3 Latvia | Season 1, 2007: Lauris Reiniks & Aleksandra Kurusova; Season 2, 2008: Raivis Vidzis & Viola Abramova; Season 3, 2010: Ainārs Ančevskis & Ieva Kemlere; Season 4, 2015: Liene Greifāne & Viktors Haritonovs; Season 5, 2022: Maksims Busels & Jelizaveta Manija | Current Iļja Vlasenko (Season 5–); Marta Kalēja-Irbe (Season 5–); Jānis Purviņš (Season 5–); Former; Three and then four per week (no fixed jury) | Current Martiņš Spuris (Season 5–); Arvis Zēmanis (Season 5–) Former; Iveta Feldmane (Seasons 1–3); Valters Krauze (Seasons 1–4); Jana Duļevska (Season 4) |
| Lebanon | Dancing with the Stars: Raqs el Noujoum رقص النجوم | MTV | Season 1, 2012–2013: Naya & Abdo Dalloul; Season 2, 2013–2014: Daniella Rahme & Raed Mourad; Season 3, 2015: Anthony Touma & Chloé Hourani; Season 4, 2016–2017: Badih Abou Chacra and Sandra Abbas; Season 5, 2026–2027:TBA | Current Daniella Rahme (Series 5–present); Rabih Nahas (Series 1–present); Mira Samaha (Series 1–present); Darren Bennett (Series 1–present) Former; Mazen Kiwan (Series 1–4) | Current Antoine Saadeh (Series 5–present); Jessica Azar (Series 5–present) Former; Carla Haddad (Series 1–4); Wissam Breidy (Series 1–4) |
| Lithuania | Šok su manimi (Note: Copycat version of the programme, not officially licensed.) | TV3 Lithuania | Season 1, 2009: Šorena Džaniašvili & Deividas Meškauskas; Season 2, 2010: Donatas Montvydas & Katerina Voropaj; Season 3, 2011–2012: Dominykas Vaitiekūnas & Justina Žemaitytė; Season 4, 2012–2013: Mindaugas Rainys & Milana Jašinskytė-Pankevičienė; Season 5, 2014–2015: Martynas Kavaliauskas & Renata Gramauskaitė | | |
| Lithuania | Šok su žvaigžde | LRT | Season 1, 2019: Paula Valentaitė & Gedvinas Meškauskas; Season 2, 2020: Kristina Radžiukynaitė & Justas Girdvainis; Season 3, 2021: Paulina Taujanskaitė & Rolandas Beržinis | | Current; Vytautas Rumšas; Gabrielė Martirosian |
| Mexico | Bailando por un Sueño | Televisa | Season 1, 2006: Latin Lover & Mariana Vallejo; Season 2, 2007: Alessandra Rosaldo & Israel Aquino; Season 3, 2014: María León & Adrián Arellano; Season 4, 2017: Adrián Di Monte & Montserrat Yescas | María León (Season 4); María José (Season 4); Gente De Zona (Season 4); Flavio Mendoza (Season 4); Former; Emma Pulido (Seasons 1–2); Edith González (Seasons 1–2); Félix Greco (Seasons 1–2); Roberto Mitsuko (Seasons 1–3); Bianca Marroquín (Season 3); Fey (Season 3); Carlos Baute (Season 3); Roberto Mitsuko (Season 4, weeks 3–5); Lolita Cortés (Season 4, weeks 4–5) | Javier Poza (Season 4); Bárbara Islas (Season 4); Adal Ramones (Seasons 1–2); Liza Echeverría (Seasons 1–2); Adrián Uribe (Season 3); Livia Brito (Season 3) |
| Mexico | Mira Quien Baila | Televisa | Season 1, 2018: | Lolita Cortés; Dayanara Torres; Joaquín Cortés | Javier Poza; Chiquinquirá Delgado |
| Mexico | México Baila | TV Azteca | Season 1, 2013: Niurka Marcos | Ema Pulido; Bibi Gaytan; Matilde Obregon | Rafael Araneda; Raquel Bigorra |
| Mongolia | Ододтой бүжиглэе | Mongol TV | Season 1, 2021: Battur Batbaatar & B. Khaliun; Season 2, 2025: T. Enerel & B. Batmanlai | Шүнгээгийн Баасан; Sarankhuu Ochirkhuu; Uuganbayar Enkhbat; Naran Surenjav | Manduul Baasansuren; Khongorzul Gankhuyag |
| Myanmar | Dancing with the Stars Myanmar | MRTV-4 | Season 1, 2019–20: Nant Chit Nadi Zaw & Tae Min | Ian; Jimmy Ko Ko; Khine Lay | Kaung Htet Zaw; La Won Htet |
| Nepal | Dancing with the Stars Nepal | Himalaya TV | Season 1, 2020: Sumi Moktan & Biju Parki (Subiju); Season 2, 2022: Chhiring Sherpa & Saroj Rana Praja | Gauri Malla; Renasha Rai Rana; Dilip Rayamajhi | Suman Karki; Sadikshya Shrestha |
| Netherlands | Dancing with the Stars | RTL 4 | Season 1, 2005: Jim Bakkum & Julie Fryer; Season 2, 2006: Barbara de Loor & Marcus van Teijlingen; Season 3, 2007: Helga van Leur & Marcus van Teijlingen; Season 4, 2009: Jamai Loman & Gwyneth van Rijn; Season 5, 2019: Samantha Steenwijk & Marcus van Teijlingen | Cor van de Stroet (Seasons 1–3); Marcel Bake (Seasons 1–3); Monique van Opstal (Seasons 1–3); Jan Postulart (Seasons 1–4); Julie Fryer (Season 4); Louis van Amstel (Season 5); Irene Moors (Season 5); Euvgenia Parakhina (Season 5); Dan Karaty (Season 5) | Ron Brandsteder (Seasons 1–3); Sylvana Simons (Seasons 1–3); Beau van Erven Dorens (Season 4); Lieke van Lexmond (Season 4); Tijl Beckand (Season 5); Chantal Janzen (Season 5) |
| Netherlands | Strictly Come Dancing | AVRO | Season 1, 2012: Mark van Eeuwen & Jessica Maybury | Ruud Vermeij; Euvgenia Parakhina; Dario Gargiulo | Reinout Oerlemans; Kim-Lian van der Meij |
| New Zealand | Dancing with the Stars | TV One (2005–2009); Three (2015, 2018–) | Season 1, 2005: Norm Hewitt & Carol-Ann Hickmore; Season 2, 2006: Lorraine Downes & Aaron Gilmore; Season 3, 2007: Suzanne Paul & Stefano Olivieri; Season 4, 2008: Temepara George & Stefano Olivieri; Season 5, 2009: Tāmati Coffey & Samantha Hitch; Season 6, 2015: Simon Barnett & Vanessa Cole; Season 7, 2018: Sam Hayes & Aaron Gilmore; Season 8, 2019: Manu Vatuvei & Loryn Reynolds; Season 9, 2022: Jazz Thornton & Brad Coleman | Current; Camilla Sacre-Dallerup (Seasons 7–present); Elektra Shock (Seasons 9–present); Lance Savali (Seasons 9–present) Former; Julz Tocker (Seasons 7–8); Rachel White (Seasons 7–8); Stefano Olivieri (Season 6); Candy Lane (Season 6); Hayley Holt (Season 6); Alison Leonard (Seasons 1–5); Brendan Cole (Seasons 1–5); Paul Mercurio (Seasons 1–2, 4–5); Craig Revel Horwood (Seasons 3–5); Donna Dawson (Seasons 1); Carol-Ann Hickmore (Seasons 2–3) | Current; Sharyn Casey (Seasons 6–present); Clint Randell (Season 9–present) Former; Dai Henwood (Seasons 7–8); Dominic Bowden (Season 6); Jason Gunn (Seasons 1–5); Candy Lane (Seasons 1–5) |
| North Macedonia | Танц со Ѕвездите; Tanc so Zvezdite | MRT 1 | Season 1, 2013: Atanas Nikolovski & Jovana Vasileva; Season 2, 2014: Natasa Ilievska & Daniel Kimovski | | Toni Mihajlovski; Marijana Stanojkovska |
| Norway | Skal vi danse? | TV 2 | Season 1, 2006: Katrine Moholt & Bjørn Wettre Holthe; Season 2, 2006: Kristian Ødegård & Alexandra Kakurina; Season 3, 2007: Tshawe Baqwa & Maria Sandvik; Season 4, 2008: Lene Alexandra Øien & Tom Erik Nilsen; Season 5, 2009: Carsten Skjelbreid & Elena Bokoreva Wiulsrud; Season 6, 2010: Åsleik Engmark & Nadya Khamitskaya; Season 7, 2011: Atle Pettersen & Marianne Sandaker; Season 8, 2012: Hanne Sørvaag & Egor Filipenko; Season 9, 2013: Eirik Søfteland & Nadya Khamitskaya; Season 10, 2014: Agnete Saba & Egor Filipenko; Season 11, 2015: Adelén & Benjamin Jayakoddy; Season 12, 2016: Eilev Bjerkerud & Nadya Khamitskaya; Season 13, 2017: Helene Olafsen & Jørgen Nilsen; Season 14, 2018: Einar Nilsson & Anette Stokke; Season 15, 2019: Aleksander Hetland & Nadya Khamitskaya; Season 16, 2020: Andreas Solberg Wahl & Mai Mentzoni; Season 17, 2021: Simon Nitsche & Helene Spilling; Season 18, 2022: Cengiz Al & Rikke Lund; Season 19, 2023: Alexandra Joner & Ole Thomas Hansen; Season 20, 2025: Tale Torjussen & Antonio Careri | Current; Trine Dehli Cleve (Seasons 1–present); Morten Hegseth (Seasons 17–present); Merete Lingjærde (Seasons 11–present); Former; Toni Ferraz (Season 10); Gyda Bloch Thorsen (Season 10); Anita Langset (Season 1); Trond Harr (Seasons 1–3); Tor Fløysvik (Seasons 1–9); Cecilie Brinck Rygel (Season 2); Christer Tornell (Seasons 3–9); Alexandra Kakurina (Season 4); Karianne Stensen Gulliksen (Seasons 5–9) | Current; Helene Olafsen (Seasons 18–present); Anders Hoff (Seasons 13 –present); Former; Tommy Steine (Seasons 1–2); Guri Solberg (Seasons 1–4 & 9); Kristian Ødegård (Seasons 3–6); Pia Lykke (Season 5); Marthe Sveberg Bjørstad (Season 6); Yngvar Numme (Season 7); Carsten Skjelbreid (Seasons 8–9) |
| Panama | Dancing with the Stars Panamá | | Season 1, 2012: Michael Vega & Johan Pérez; Season 2, 2013: Jimmy Bad Boy & Ilda Mason | Moyra Brunette; David Martínez; Yilca Arosemena Espino | Blanca Herrera; Iván Donoso |
| Poland | Taniec z gwiazdami | TVN (2005–2011) | Season 1, Spring 2005: Olivier Janiak & Kamila Kajak; Season 2, Fall 2005: Katarzyna Cichopek & Marcin Hakiel; Season 3, Spring 2006: Rafał Mroczek & Aneta Piotrowska; Season 4, Fall 2006: Kinga Rusin & Stefano Terrazzino; Season 5, Spring 2007: Krzysztof Tyniec & Kamila Kajak; Season 6, Fall 2007: Anna Guzik & Łukasz Czarnecki; Season 7, Spring 2008: Magdalena Walach & Cezary Olszewski; Season 8, Fall 2008: Agata Kulesza & Stefano Terrazzino; Season 9, Spring 2009: Dorota Gardias & Andrej Mosejcuk; Season 10, Fall 2009: Anna Mucha & Rafał Maserak; Season 11, Spring 2010: Julia Kamińska & Rafał Maserak; Season 12, Fall 2010: Monika Pyrek & Robert Rowiński; Season 13, Fall 2011: Kacper Kuszewski & Anna Głogowska | Iwona Szymańska-Pavlović (1–13); Piotr Galiński (1–13); Janusz Józefowicz (13); Jolanta Fraszyńska (13); Zbigniew Wodecki (1–12); Beata Tyszkiewicz (1–12) | Natasza Urbańska (13); Piotr Gąsowski (6–13); Katarzyna Skrzynecka (2–12); Hubert Urbański (1–5); Magda Mołek (1) |
| Poland | Dancing with the Stars. Taniec z gwiazdami | Polsat (2014–present) | Season 14, Spring 2014: Aneta Zając & Stefano Terrazzino; Season 15, Fall 2014: Agnieszka Sienkiewicz & Stefano Terrazzino; Season 16, Spring 2015: Krzysztof Wieszczek & Agnieszka Kaczorowska; Season 17, Fall 2015: Ewelina Lisowska & Tomasz Barański; Season 18, Spring 2016: Anna Karczmarczyk & Jacek Jeschke; Season 19, Fall 2016: Robert Wabich & Hanna Żudziewicz; Season 20, Spring 2017: Natalia Szroeder & Jan Kliment; Season 21, Spring 2018: Beata Tadla & Jan Kliment; Season 22, Spring 2019: Joanna Mazur & Jan Kliment; Season 23, Fall 2019: Damian Kordas & Janja Lesar; Season 24, Spring, Fall 2020: Edyta Zając & Michał Bartkiewicz; Season 25, Fall 2021: Piotr Mróz & Hanna Żudziewicz; Season 26, Fall 2022: Ilona Krawczyńska & Robert Rowiński; Season 27, Spring 2024: Anita Sokołowska & Jacek Jeschke; Season 28, Fall 2024: Vanessa Aleksander & Michał Bartkiewicz; Season 29, Spring 2025: Maria Jeleniewska & Jacek Jeschke; Season 30, Fall 2025: Mikołaj Bagiński & Magdalena Tarnowska; Season 31, Spring 2026: Gamou Fall & Hanna Żudziewicz; Season 32, Fall 2026: | Current; Iwona Pavlović (14–); Rafał Maserak (27-); Tomasz Wygoda (27-); Julia Wieniawa (32-); Former; Ewa Kasprzyk (27-31); Andrzej Piaseczny (25–26); Michał Malitowski (14–21, 22; week 11, 23–26); Andrzej Grabowski (14–26); Ola Jordan (21–22); Beata Tyszkiewicz (14–20) | Current; Krzysztof Ibisz (14–); Paulina Sykut-Jeżyna (18–); Former; Anna Głogowska (14–17); Izabela Janachowska (25-26) |
| Portugal | Dança Comigo | RTP1 | Season 1, 2006: Daniela Ruah; Season 2, 2006: Sónia Araújo; Season 3, 2007: Luciana Abreu; Season 4, 2008: Vítor Fonseca; Season 5, 2023: Inês Aires Pereira | João Baião (season 1–4); Marco de Camilis (season 1–4); São José Lapa (season 1–3); Rita Blanco (season 4); Filipe La Féria (season 5); Sónia Araújo (season 5); Noua Wong (season 5) | Catarina Furtado (season 1, 4); Silvia Alberto (season 1–3, 5) |
| Portugal | Dança Comigo no Gelo | RTP1 | Season 1, 2009: Sónia Araújo | João Baião; Rita Blanco; Marco de Camilis | Catarina Furtado (season 1) |
| Portugal | Dança com as Estrelas | TVI | Season 1, 2013: Sara Matos & André; Season 2, 2014: Lourenço Ortigão & Mónica; Season 3, 2015: Sara Prata & Marco; Season 4, 2018–19: José Condessa & Ana Cardoso; Season 5, 2020: Cancelled due to COVID-19 pandemic Season 6, 2024: Upcoming Season | Current; Alexandra Lencastre(1–4, 6-); Alberto Rodrigues (1–3, 5-); Vítor Fonseca; Former; Duarte Vieira (4); Jessica Athayde (5) | Current; Cristina Ferreira (1–3, 6-); Bruno Cabrerizo (6-); Former; Rita Pereira (4–5); Pedro Teixeira (3–5) |
| Romania | Dansez pentru tine (Dancing for you) | Pro TV | Season 1, Spring 2006: Andra & Florin Birică; Season 2, Fall 2006: Victor Slav & Carmen Stepan; Season 3, Spring 2007: Cosmin Stan & Doina Ocu; Season 4, Fall 2007: Alex Velea & Cristina Stoicescu; Season 5, Spring 2008: Andreea Bălan & Petrişor Ruge; Season 6, Fall 2008: Giulia Anghelescu & Andrei Ştefan; Season 7, Spring 2009: Monica Irimia & Darius Belu; Season 8, Fall 2009: Jean de la Craiova & Sandra Neacşu; Season 9, Spring 2010: Cătălin Moroşanu & Magda Ciorobea; Season 10, Fall 2010: Octavian Strunilă & Ella Dumitru; Season 11, Spring 2011: Corina Bud & Eduard Ionuţ Vasile; Season 12, Fall 2011: Jojo & Ionuț Tănase; Season 13, 2012: Roxana Ionescu & George Boghian; Season 14, 2013: Ilinca Vandici & Răzvan Marton; Season 15, 2027: Upcoming season | Current TBA (15–); TBA (15–); TBA (15–); TBA (15–); TBA (15–) Former; Răzvan Mazilu (1); Mariana Bitang (1–2); Octavian Bellu (1/2, temporary replacement); Cornel Patrichi (2–12); Wilmark Rizzo Hernández (1–13); Mihai Petre (2–14); Emilia Popescu (1–14); Beatrice Rancea (2–14); Edi Stancu (13–14); Elwira Petre (14); Marin "Nea Marin" Barbu (8, temporary replacement, 14, special guest) | Current TBA (15–); TBA (15–) Former; Olivia Steer (1); Ștefan Bănică Jr. (1–14); Iulia Vântur (2–14) |
| Romania | Dansează printre stele (Dancing with the stars) | Antena 1 | Season 1, 2014: Alina Pușcaș & Bogdan Boantă | Mihai Petre; Jojo; Igor Munteanu | Horia Brenciu; Lili Sandu; Victor Slav |
| Romania | Uite cine dansează! (Look who's dancing!) | Pro TV | Season 1, 2017: Marius Manole & Olesea Nespeac-Micula | Mihai Petre; Florin Călinescu; Andreea Marin; Gigi Căciuleanu | Cabral Ibacka; Mihaela Rădulescu |
| Russia | Танцы со звёздами (Tantsy so zvyozdami) | Russia-1 | Season 1, 2006: Maria Sittel & Vladislav Borodinov; Season 2, 2006: Anna Snatkina & Euvgeni Grigorov; Season 3, 2008: Daria Sagalova & Anton Kovalev; Season 4, 2009: Yulia Savicheva & Euvgeni Papunaishvili; Season 5, 2010: Anastasia Stockaya & Alexey Ledenev; Season 6, 2011: Tatiana Bulanova & Dimitry Lashenko; Season 7, 2012: Glukoza & Euvgeni Papunaishvili; Season 8, 2013: Yelena Podkaminskaya & Andrei Karpov; Season 9, 2015: Irina Pegova & Andrei Kozlovskiy; Season 10, 2016: Aleksandra Ursulyak & Denis Tagintsev; Season 11, 2020: Ivan Stebunov & Inna Svechnikova; Season 12, 2021: Sergey Lazarev & Ekaterina Osipova; Season 13, 2022: Alexandra Revenko & Denis Tagintsev | Nicolaj Ciskaridze (Seasons 2–8, 10–13); Egor Druginin (Seasons 6–8, 11–13); Yelena Chaykovskaya (Seasons 7–8); Oleg Menshikov (Seasons 8); Vladimir Ivanov (Seasons 8); Irina Viner (Seasons 1, 9); Valentin Gneushev (Season 1); Vladimir Andrukin (Seasons 1–3); Stanislav Popov (Seasons 1–6, 10); Alla Sigalova (Seasons 1–6); Anastasia Volochkova (Season 7) | Andrei Malakhov (Season 11–13); Garik Martirosyan (Season 10); Daria Spiridonova (Zlatopolskaya) (Seasons 4–10); Maxim Galkin (Seasons 4–9); Anastasia Zavorotnyuk (Seasons 1–3); Yuri Nikolaev (Seasons 1–3) |
| Serbia | Ples sa zvezdama | Prva | Season 1, 2014: Ivan Mihailović & Marija Martinović | Nikola Mandić; Marija Prelević; Aleksandar Josipović; Konstantin Kostjukov | Irina Radović; Aleksa Jelić |
| Slovakia | Let's Dance | Markiza | Season 1, 2006: Zuzana Fialová & Peter Modrovský; Season 2, 2008: Michaela Čobejová & Tomáš Surovec; Season 3, 2009: Juraj Mokrý & Katarína Štumpfová; Season 4, 2010: Nela Pocisková & Peter Modrovský; Season 5, 2011: Janka Hospodárová & Matej Chren; Season 6, 2017: Vladimír Kobielsky & Dominika Chrapeková; Season 7, 2022: Ján Koleník & Vanda Polaková; Season 8, 2023: Jana Kovalčiková & Vilém Šír; Season 9, 2024: Jakub Jablonský & Eliška Lenčešová; Season 10, 2025: Kristián Baran & Dominika Rošková; Season 11, 2026: Zuzana Porubjaková & Matyáš Adamec | Current; Ján Ďurovčík (1-3, 5-); Tatiana Drexler (2-4, 6-); Adela Vinczeová (7-); Former Elena Jágerská (1); Dagmar Hubová (1, 3-4); Jozef Bednárik (1-5); Zdeněk Chlopčík (4-5); Dara Rolins (5); Petr Horáček (6); Zuzana Fialová (2, 6); Jorge González (7); Ján Koleník (8) | Current; Viktor Vincze (7-); Lucia Hlaváčková (8-); Former; Martin "Pyco" Rausch (1-4, 6); Adela Vinczeová (1-2, 4-6); Zuzana Fialová (3); Libor Bouček (5); Martina Zábranská (7) |
| Slovakia | Bailando - Tanec pre teba | Markiza | Season 1, 2007: Viktória Ráková & Juraj Šoltés | Josef Laufer; Mário Radačovský; Helena Štiavnická; Ján Ďurovčík | Viliam Rozboril |
| Slovakia | Tanec snov | TV JOJ | Season 1, 2015: Diana Mórová & Andrej Krížik | Peter Modrovský; Eva Máziková; Ján Ďurovčík | Viliam Rozboril |
| Slovenia | Zvezde plešejo | POP TV | Season 1, 2017: Dejan Vunjak & Tadeja Pavlič; Season 2, 2018: Natalija Gros & Miha Perat; Season 3, 2019: Tanja Žagar & Arnej Ivkovič; Season 4, 2020: Cancelled due to COVID-19 pandemic | Katarina Venturini (Seasons 1–4); Andrej Škufca (Seasons 1–4); Nika Urbas Ambrožič (Seasons 1–4); Lado Bizovičar (Seasons 1–4) | Peter Poles (Seasons 1–4); Tara Zupančič (Seasons 1–4) |
| South Africa | Strictly Come Dancing | SABC 2 (2006–08); SABC3 (2013–15) | Season 1, 2006: Zuraida Jardine & Michael Wentink; Season 2, 2006: Riann Venter & Hayley Hammond; Season 3, 2007: Hip Hop Pantsula & Hayley Bennett; Season 4, 2008: Emmanuel Castis & Lindsey Muckle; Season 5, 2008: Rob van Vuuren & Mary Martin; Season 6, 2013: Zakeeya Patel & Ryan Hammond; Season 7, 2014: Jonathan Boynton-Lee & Hayley Bennett; Season 8, 2015: Karlien van Jaarsveld & Devon Snell | Michael Wentink (Seasons 6–8); Tebogo Kgobokoe (Seasons 6–8); Samantha Peo (Seasons 6–8); Dave Campbell (Seasons 1–5); Salome Sechele (Seasons 1–5); Lilian Phororo (Seasons 1–5); Tyrone Watkins (Seasons 1–5) | Marc Lottering (Seasons 6–8); Pabi Moloi (Seasons 6–8); Ian von Memerty (Seasons 1–5); Sandy Ngema (Seasons 1–5) |
| South Africa | Dancing with the Stars | M-Net | Season 1, 2018: Connell Cruise and Marcella Solimeo | Tebogo Kgobokoe; Bryan Watson; Debbie Turner; Jason Gilkison | Tracey Lange; Chris Jaftha |
| South Korea | Dancing with the Stars | MBC | Season 1, 2011: Moon Hee-joon & Ahn Hye-sang; Season 2, 2012: Choi Yeo-jin & Park Ji-woo; Season 3, 2013: Fei & Kim Soo Ro | Kim Ju-Won; Alex Kim (Seasons 2–3); Park Sang-won (Season 3); Nam Kyeong-Ju (Season 1); Hwang Sun-Woo (Season 1); Song Seung-Hwan (Season 2) | Lee Deok-hwa; Kim Gyu-ri (Seasons 2–3); Lee So-ra (Season 1) |
| Spain | ¡Mira quién baila! (Seasons 1–7, 9) ¡Más que baile! (Season 8) | La 1 (2005–09, 2014); Telecinco (2010) | Season 1, 2005: Claudia Molina; Season 2, 2006: David Civera; Season 3, 2006: Rosa López; Season 4, 2006: Estela Giménez; Season 5, 2007: Manolo Sarriá; Season 6, 2007: Nani Gaitán; Season 7, 2009: Manuel Bandera; Season 8, 2010: Belén Esteban; Season 9, 2014: Miguel Abellán | Joana Subirana (Seasons 1–8); Javier Castillo (Seasons 1–5); Teté Delgado (Seasons 1–3, 5); Fernando Romay (Seasons 2–3); Rosario Pardo (Season 4); Boris Izaguirre (Seasons 6–8); Aída Gómez (Seasons 6–8); César Cadaval (Season 6); Victor Ullate Roche (Season 8); Santi Rodríguez (Season 8); El Sevilla (Season 9); Noemí Galera (Season 9); Norma Duval (Season 9); Ángel Corella (Season 9) | Anne Igartiburu (Seasons 1–7); Pilar Rubio (Season 8); Jaime Cantizano (Season 9) |
| Spain | Bailando con las estrellas | La 1 (2018); Telecinco (2024–) | Season 1, 2018: David Bustamante and Yana Oliana; Season 2, 2024: María Isabel and Luis Montero; Season 3 , 2025 Jorge González and Gemma Domínguez | Current; Blanca Li (Season 2–); Gorka Márquez (Season 2–); Julia Gómez Cora (Season 2–); Pelayo Díaz (Season 3–); Inmaculada Casal (Season 3–); Former; Moira Chapman (Season 1); Joaquín Cortés (Season 1); Isabel Pérez (Season 1); Boris Izaguirre (Season 2); Antonia Dell’Atte (Season 2) | Current; Jesús Vázquez (Season 2–); Valeria Mazza (Season 2–); Former; Roberto Leal (Season 1); Rocío Muñoz Morales (Season 1) |
| Sweden | Let's Dance | TV4 | Season 1, 2006: Måns Zelmerlöw & Maria Karlsson; Season 2, 2007: Martin Lidberg & Cecilia Ehrling; Season 3, 2008: Tina Nordström & Tobias Karlsson; Season 4, 2009: Magnus Samuelsson & Annika Sjöö; Season 5, 2010: Mattias Andréasson & Cecilia Ehrling; Season 6, 2011: Jessica Andersson & Kristjan Lootus; Season 7, 2012: Anton Hysén & Sigrid Bernson; Season 8, 2013: Markoolio & Cecilia Ehrling; Season 9, 2014: Benjamin Wahlgren Ingrosso & Sigrid Bernson; Season 10, 2015: Ingemar Stenmark & Cecilia Ehrling; Season 11, 2016: Elisa Lindström & Yvo Essen; Season 12, 2017: Jesper Blomqvist & Malin Watson; Season 13, 2018: Jon Henrik Fjällgren & Katja Luján Engelholm; Season 14, 2019: Kristin Kaspersen & Calle Sterner; Season 15, 2020: John Lundvik & Linn Hegdal; Season 16, 2021: Filip Lamprecht & Linn Hegdal; Season 17, 2022: Eric Saade & Katja Lujan Engelholm; Season 18, 2023: Hampus Hedström & Ines Maria Ștefănescu; Season 19, 2025: Theoz & Paulina Rosenkvist | Current; Ann Wilson (Seasons 1–18); Tony Irving (Seasons 1–18, 20); Dermot Clemenger (Seasons 1–10, 15–18); Former; Maria Öhrman (Seasons 1–5); Isabel Edvardsson (Season 6); Cecilia Lazar (Seasons 11–14) | David Hellenius (Seasons 1–20); David Lindgren (Seasons 16–18); Agneta Sjödin (Seasons 1–2); Jessica Almenäs (Seasons 3–11); Kristin Kaspersen (Seasons 18); Petra Mede (Seasons 16–17); Tilde de Paula (Seasons 12–15) |
| Thailand | Dancing with the Stars | BBTV Channel 7 | Season 1, 2013: Timethai Plangsilp & Pinklao Nararuk | Tinakorn Asvarak; Manaswee Kridtanukul; Amon Chatpaisal | Morakot Kittisara (Season 1–present); Piyawat Khemthong (Season 1–present); Former: Sornram Teppitak (Season 1) |
| Turkey | Yok Böyle Dans | Show TV | Season 1, 2010: Azra Akın & Nikolay Monolov; Season 2, 2011: Özge Ulusoy & Vitali Kozmin | Sait Sökmen (Season 1–2); Tan Sağtürk (Season 1–2); Acun Ilıcalı (Season 2); Azra Akın (Season 2); Lilia Bennett (Season 1); Saba Tümer (Season 1) | Acun Ilıcalı (Season 1); Hanzade Ofluoğlu (Season 1–2); Burcu Esmersoy(Season 2); Cem Ceminay (Season 2) |
| Ukraine | Танці з зірками Tantsi z zirkamy | 1+1 (2006–2007; 2017–2025) | Season 1, 2006: Volodymyr Zelenskyy & Olena Shoptenko; Season 2, Spring 2007: Lilia Podkopayeva & Sergey Kostecki; Season 3, Fall 2007: Marcin Mroczek & Anna Pilipenko; Season 4, 2017: Natalia Mohylevska & Ihor Kuzmenko; Season 5, 2018: Ihor Lastochkin & Ilona Hvozdeva; Season 6, 2019: Kseniya Mishyna & Yevhen Kot; Season 7, 2020: Santa Dimopulos & Maks Leonov; Season 8, 2021: Artur Lohai & Anna Karelina; Special, 2025: Rusia Danilkina & Pavlo Simakin | Francisco Gomez (Season 7); Vlad Yama (Seasons 5–8); Kateryna Kuhar (Seasons 5–8); Monatik (Seasons 5–6); Gregory Chapkis (Seasons 1–3, 7–8); Helen Kolyadenko (Seasons 1–3); Alex Litvinov (Seasons 1–3) | Yuriy Horbunov (Seasons 1–8, the special); Tina Karol (Seasons 1–8) |
| Ukraine | Танці з зірками Tantsi z zirkamy | STB (2011) | Season 1, 2011: Stas Shurins & Olena Pul | Radu Poklitaru (Season 1); Tetyana Denisova (Season 1); Yaakko Toyvonen (Season 1); Natalia Mohilevska (Season 1) | Iryna Borysyuk (Season 4); Dmytro Tankovych (Season 4) |
| United Kingdom (original) | Strictly Come Dancing | BBC One | Series 1, Spring/Summer 2004: Natasha Kaplinsky & Brendan Cole; Series 2, Autumn 2004: Jill Halfpenny & Darren Bennett; Series 3, 2005: Darren Gough & Lilia Kopylova; Series 4, 2006: Mark Ramprakash & Karen Hardy; Series 5, 2007: Alesha Dixon & Matthew Cutler; Series 6, 2008: Tom Chambers & Camilla Dallerup; Series 7, 2009: Chris Hollins & Ola Jordan; Series 8, 2010: Kara Tointon & Artem Chigvintsev; Series 9, 2011: Harry Judd & Aliona Vilani; Series 10, 2012: Louis Smith & Flavia Cacace; Series 11, 2013: Abbey Clancy & Aljaž Skorjanec; Series 12, 2014: Caroline Flack & Pasha Kovalev; Series 13, 2015: Jay McGuiness & Aliona Vilani; Series 14, 2016: Ore Oduba & Joanne Clifton; Series 15, 2017: Joe McFadden & Katya Jones; Series 16, 2018: Stacey Dooley & Kevin Clifton; Series 17, 2019: Kelvin Fletcher & Oti Mabuse; Series 18, 2020: Bill Bailey & Oti Mabuse; Series 19, 2021: Rose Ayling-Ellis & Giovanni Pernice; Series 20, 2022: Hamza Yassin & Jowita Przystał; Series 21, 2023: Ellie Leach & Vito Coppola; Series 22, 2024: Chris McCausland & Dianne Buswell; Series 23, 2025: Karen Carney & Carlos Gu | Current; Craig Revel Horwood; Shirley Ballas (15–); Motsi Mabuse (17–); Anton du Beke (19–); Former; Arlene Phillips (1–6); Alesha Dixon (7–9); Len Goodman (1–14); Darcey Bussell (10–16); Bruno Tonioli (1–17) | Current; Emma Willis (24–); Josh Widdicombe (24–); Johannes Radebe (24–); Former; Sir Bruce Forsyth (1–11); Tess Daly (1–23); Claudia Winkleman (12–23) |
| United States | Dancing with the Stars | ABC (1–30, 32–); Disney+ (31–) | Season 1, 2005: Kelly Monaco & Alec Mazo; Season 2, Winter 2006: Drew Lachey & Cheryl Burke; Season 3, Fall 2006: Emmitt Smith & Cheryl Burke; Season 4, Spring 2007: Apolo Anton Ohno & Julianne Hough; Season 5, Fall 2007: Hélio Castroneves & Julianne Hough; Season 6, Spring 2008: Kristi Yamaguchi & Mark Ballas; Season 7, Fall 2008: Brooke Burke & Derek Hough; Season 8, Spring 2009: Shawn Johnson & Mark Ballas; Season 9, Fall 2009: Donny Osmond & Kym Johnson; Season 10, Spring 2010: Nicole Scherzinger & Derek Hough; Season 11, Fall 2010: Jennifer Grey & Derek Hough; Season 12, Spring 2011: Hines Ward & Kym Johnson; Season 13, Fall 2011: J. R. Martinez & Karina Smirnoff; Season 14, Spring 2012: Donald Driver & Peta Murgatroyd; Season 15, Fall 2012: Melissa Rycroft & Tony Dovolani; Season 16, Spring 2013: Kellie Pickler & Derek Hough; Season 17, Fall 2013: Amber Riley & Derek Hough; Season 18, Spring 2014: Meryl Davis & Maksim Chmerkovskiy; Season 19, Fall 2014: Alfonso Ribeiro & Witney Carson; Season 20, Spring 2015: Rumer Willis & Valentin Chmerkovskiy; Season 21, Fall 2015: Bindi Irwin & Derek Hough; Season 22, Spring 2016: Nyle DiMarco & Peta Murgatroyd; Season 23, Fall 2016: Laurie Hernandez & Valentin Chmerkovskiy; Season 24, Spring 2017: Rashad Jennings & Emma Slater; Season 25, Fall 2017: Jordan Fisher & Lindsay Arnold; Season 26, Spring 2018: Adam Rippon & Jenna Johnson; Season 27, Fall 2018: Bobby Bones & Sharna Burgess; Season 28, 2019: Hannah Brown & Alan Bersten; Season 29, 2020: Kaitlyn Bristowe & Artem Chigvintsev; Season 30, 2021: Iman Shumpert & Daniella Karagach; Season 31, 2022: Charli D'Amelio & Mark Ballas; Season 32, 2023: Xochitl Gomez & Val Chmerkovskiy; Season 33, 2024: Joey Graziadei & Jenna Johnson; Season 34, 2025: Robert Irwin & Witney Carson; Season 35, 2026: upcoming season | Current; Carrie Ann Inaba; Bruno Tonioli; Derek Hough (29–); Former; Len Goodman (1–20, 22–28, 30–31); Julianne Hough (19–21, 23–24) | Current; Alfonso Ribiero (31–); Julianne Hough (32–); Former; Tom Bergeron (1–28); Lisa Canning (1); Samantha Harris (2–9); Brooke Burke Charvet (10–17); Erin Andrews (18–28); Tyra Banks (29–31) |
| United States | Dancing with the Stars: Juniors | ABC | Season 1, 2018: Sky Brown & JT Church | Adam Rippon; Valentin Chmerkovskiy; Mandy Moore | Jordan Fisher; Frankie Muniz |
| United States | Dancing with the Stars: The Next Pro | ABC | Season 1, 2026: Adele Zaikman | Mark Ballas; Shirley Ballas | Robert Irwin |
| United States | ¡Mira quién baila! (in Spanish) | Univisión | Season 1, 2010: Vadhir Derbez; Season 2, 2011: Adamari López; Season 3, 2012: Henry Santos; Season 4, 2013: Johnny Lozada; Season 5, 2017: Dayanara Torres; Season 6, 2018: Greeicy Rendón; All Stars, 2019: Clarissa Molina; All Stars, 2020: Kiara Liz; Univisión All Stars, 2021: Jesus Díaz "Chef Yisus"; All Stars, 2022: María León ¡La revancha!, 2023: Adrián Lastra | Current; Roselyn Sánchez (Season 5–); Johnny Lozada (Season 5–); Javier Castillo (Season 5–); Former; Alejandra Guzmán (Season 1); Lili Estefan (Season 2–3); Bianca Marroquín; Horacio Villalobos; Ninel Conde (Season 4) | Javier Poza; Chiquinquirá Delgado; Jomari Goyso (Season 5–) |
| Vietnam | Bước nhảy hoàn vũ | VTV3 | Season 1, 2010: Ngô Thanh Vân & Tihomir Gavrilov Season 2, 2011: Vũ Thu Minh & Lachezar Todorov; Season 3, 2012: Minh Hằng & Atanas Malamov; Season 4, 2013: Yến Trang & Tihomir Gavrilov; Series 5, 2014: Thu Thủy & Daniel Denev and Ngân Khánh & Kristian Yordanov; Season 6, 2015: Ninh Dương Lan Ngọc & Daniel Nikolov Denev; Season 7, 2016: S.T Sơn Thạch & Vyara Season 8, 2024: Quỳnh Nga | Current; Khánh Thi Chí Anh (Season 1–3, 7,8); Đoan Trang & S.T Sơn Thạch (Season 8); Former; Lê Hoàng (Seasons 1 & 4); Nguyễn Quang Dũng (Seasons 1–2); Trần Tiến (Season 2); Đức Huy (Season 2); Quốc Bảo (Season 3); Hồ Hoài Anh (Season 3) Trần Ly Ly (Seasons 4–7) Hồng Việt (Season 7); Minh Hằng (Seasons 4–7); John Huy Trần (Season 7) | Thanh Bạch (Seasons 1–2, 6–7) Mỹ Linh (Seasons 6–7); Nguyên Khang (Seasons 5, 8); Yến Trang (Season 5); Thanh Vân (Seasons 1 & 3); Đoan Trang (Season 2); Nguyên Vũ (Season 3); Đông Nhi (Season 4); Lương Mạnh Hải (Season 4); Vũ Mạnh Cường (Season 8) |

International versions of Strictly Come Dancing (map correct as of February 2017)

=== China (including Hong Kong) ===
The Chinese version is a co-production between mainland China's HBS and Hong Kong's TVB, under licence from the BBC. In mainland China, it is aired on Hunan Television and in Hong Kong on TVB Jade. The Chinese title (simplified Chinese: 舞动奇迹; traditional Chinese: 舞動奇跡; pinyin: Wǔdòngqíjì) is difficult to translate, but could be rendered as Miracle Dancing or "Miracles of Dance Moves". Each broadcaster provides five male and five female dancers, for a total of twenty. Pairs were determined by audience SMS votes. The programme began airing in late 2007, in order to mark the anniversary of the 1997 handover of Hong Kong from the UK to the People's Republic of China.

=== India ===
The Indian version is called Jhalak Dikhhla Jaa. It was first broadcast in September 2006 on Sony Entertainment Television (SET). Viewers often confuse Dancing With The Stars with Nach Baliye which airs on StarPlus. Nach Baliye and Jhalak Dikhhla Jaa have similar content and presentation but there are minor differences in the concept. The celebrity dancers on Nach Baliye are real life couples, and work with an assigned choreographer. The dancers on Jhalak Dikhhla Jaa has one celebrity paired with a trained dancer/choreographer. A notice at the end of the show verifies that the Jhalak Dikhhla Jaa is indeed a version of Strictly Come Dancing.

=== Indonesia ===
Dancing with the Star Indonesia aired its first series in March 2011 on Indosiar and was hosted by Choky Sitohang and Cathy Sharon. Fadli and Trisna were the winners, while Yuanita Christiani and Wawan finished in second place, and Hengky Kurniawan and Melissa finished in third. The second series aired from October to December 2011. Lucky Widja and Sri were the winners, while Melly "SHE" and Wawan finished in second place, and Tya Ariestya and Yana finished in third.

=== Japan ===
The Japanese version is called Shall We Dance?. It has the same title as the 1996 film by the same name, but it has no relation to it beyond the shared name. Due to the fact that there was already a series-special dancing program, and that many cast members from it also appeared in the new program, the Japanese version was confused with a regularly scheduled version of the series-special, rather than its own version of the television series. It ran from 8 April 2006, to 17 March 2007 on NTV-4.

=== South Korea ===
The show (Korean: 댄싱 위드 더 스타) has aired on MBC TV since 10 June 2011, and is hosted by Lee Deok-hwa, with co-host Lee So-ra in Season 1 while former contestant Kim Gyu-ri co-hosted the second season. The first season was won by Moon Hee-joon and his partner Ahn Hye-sang while the second season was won by Choi Yeo-jin and her partner Park Ji-woo. The 3rd Season was won by pop-singer and dancer Fei and her partner Kim Soo Ro.

=== Pakistan ===
Nachley (lit. "Dance") is the Pakistani version of Dancing with the Stars. The show is aired on ARY Digital and its theme is based around traditional Pakistani music and dance concepts.

=== Peru ===
The first Peruvian reality show based on Dancing With The Stars was Baila con las estrellas (2005–2006), hosted by Rebeca Escribens and broadcast on Panamericana Televisión (channel 5) on Saturday afternoon. The show aired two seasons before it was cancelled.

Winners:

- Maricielo Effio, professional dancer (2005).
- Ismael La Rosa, actor (2006).

The second dancing show was Bailando por un sueño (Dancing for a Dream) in 2008, based on a Mexican reality show with the same name, broadcast on Panamericana Televisión, but produced by a different production: GV Producciones. This show was hosted by Gisela Valcárcel and Giancarlo Chichizola and aired every Saturday night (from June to December). The show was like Dancing With The Stars, but instead of professional dancers, there were amateur dancers. They danced every week in order to win a prize: to achieve a personal/humanitarian goal or "dream". The show had two series and the four first places of each series had the chance to dance on Reyes de la Pista.

Winners:

- Season 1: Carlos Alcántara, actor and stand-up comedian; and his partner Carolina Guerra. Their "dream" was a surgery to Guerra's cornea in order to remove some ulcers, otherwise she would have been blind.
- Season 2: Marco Zunino, actor and singer; and his partner Jardena Ugaz, their "dream" was to give Ugaz's mother an operation to remove some strange lumps that had appeared on her back.
- "Reyes de la Pista": Delly Madrid, model and business woman; and her partner José Luis Campos. They won about $280,000 in Peruvian currency and the chance to represent this country on Second Dance World Championship, in Mexico.

In 2009, El Show de los sueños was shown every Saturday night (from May to December) on América Televisión (channel 4) and hosted by Gisela Valcárcel and Christian Rivero. This reality show was a dancing and singing competition, therefore, there was one star, an amateur dancer, and an amateur singer per group. They performed to achieve a personal/humanitarian goal or "dream". The three first places of each series, one fourth place of series 1 and an eighth place of series 2 selected by the judges won a chance to perform on "Reyes del Show" (Show Kings).

Winners:

- Season 1: Sandra Muente, singer; and her partners the Herrera Soto brothers, whose "dream" was the rebuilding of "Lord of Luren" church, located in Ica, Peru.
- Season 2: Anna Carina, singer, songwriter and dancer; and her partners Carlos Suárez and Gabriela Noriega, whose "dream" was to give a surgery to Noriega's older sister, who was a morbid obese and the recovery from chronic depression.
- "Reyes del Show": Jean Paul Strauss, singer, musician and songwriter; and his partners Katherine Mendoza and Luis Enrique Baca. They won about $560,000 in Peruvian currency.

Since 2010, El Gran Show (The Amazing Show) is broadcast on América Televisión (channel 4) every Saturday night (from May to December) and is hosted by Gisela Valcárcel and Christian Rivero. This reality show is like Bailando por un Sueño: two series and a "top performers series". This time, each amateur dancer represents a Peruvian city. In this show, the pairs (the celebrity and their amateur dancer) were scored from 1 to 10 by standard judges and "V.I.P judges", who are 12 random people representing the Peruvian audience, they are weekly selected by lottery via website. The three first places from each series win a chance to dance on El Gran Show: Reyes del Show (Show Kings).

==== Winners ====
2010

- Season 1: Gisela Ponce de Leon, singer and actress; and her partner Rayder Vásquez, form Ica, Peru.
- Season 2: Belén Estévez, professional dancer; and her partner Gian Frank Navarro, from Lima, Peru. Their "dream" was to treat Navarro's four-year-old nephew, suffering from viral encephalitis, a disease that has ridden him with scoliosis, blindness and seizures.
- "Reyes del Show": Miguel Rebosio, former soccer player; and his partner Fabianne Hayashida, from Lima, Peru. They won about $560,000 in Peruvian currency.

2011

- Season 1: Raul Zuazo, actor; and his partner Dayana Calla, from Arequipa, Peru. Their "dream" was to deploy and equip a training centre for homeless children.
- Season 2: Jesus Neyra, actor; and his partner Lucero Clavijo, from Tacna, Peru. Their "dream" was to improve "Maria Domitila Lascombes" transitorial housing's infrastructure.
- "Reyes del Show"

=== Russia ===
The Russian program is called "Танцы со звёздами" ("Tantsy so zvyozdami", transliterated). The first season, which began in 2006, became successful. Its second season premiered that same year. The format of the show is identical to that of other countries. Each pair is composed of a famous celebrity and a professional dancer.

=== Turkey ===
The Turkish version was called Yok Böyle Dans. Thirteen couples were participating in the competition. Lilia Kopylova was the head of the judging panel of four. Azra Akın won the competition with her partner Nikolai.

=== Ukraine ===
In Ukraine the show started in September 2006 on television channel 1+1 under the name "Танці з зірками" ("Tantsi z zirkamy") which translates as "Dances With The Stars". The show was hosted by Yuriy Horbunov and Tina Karol. The star contestants were paired with famous Ukrainian dancers, who had won major international competitions. The winners of the show were rewarded with the tour to the Rio Carnival, while the runners-up went to the Carnival on Cuba. The show became popular with Ukrainian viewers. The first season finale held on 26 November 2006, had the TV rating of 26.83% with the share of 54.64%, meaning that a quarter of the Ukrainian population and more than half of all TV viewers at that moment watched the final. The first season overall was watched by nearly 16 million Ukrainians. The pair of Volodymyr Zelenskyy (leader of a famous Ukrainian comic troupe and future president of Ukraine) and Olena Shoptenko won the main prize.

The show aired on 1+1 for three seasons between 2006 and 2007. In 2011, STB acquired broadcasting rights, airing the program for one season. In 2017, the show returned to 1+1 and subsequently aired five seasons until 2021.

A charitable special of Tantsi z zirkamy aired on 28 December 2025 on 1+1, marking the show’s return after a four-year hiatus. The special was won by Rusya Danilkina, a war veteran and amputee who lost her leg during combat in 2022. The broadcast raised approximately ₴1.6 million for the Superhumans Center, with funds allocated to the evacuation and rehabilitation of wounded Ukrainian service members.

=== United States ===
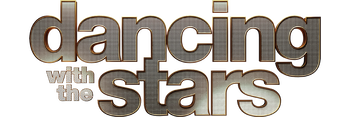
Logo of the American version since 2019

In the United States, the show is called Dancing with the Stars, which aired on ABC from 2005–2021 and since 2023, and on Disney+ since 2022, featuring athletes, singers, actors, and professional dancers. It is currently hosted by Julianne Hough and Alfonso Ribeiro. The show premiered in 2005, and became a ratings success. The Spanish-language network Univision also produced its own version in 2010 under the name Mira Quien Baila ("Look Who's Dancing"). The Len Goodman Mirror Ball trophy is manufactured by the New York firm Society Awards.

In addition, a short-lived spin-off series featuring celebrity children, titled Dancing with the Stars: Juniors, premiered on 7 October 2018, with Jordan Fisher and Frankie Muniz as hosts. Another spin-off featuring aspiring professional dancers, titled Dancing with the Stars: The Next Pro, premiered on 13 July 2026, with Robert Irwin as host.

== Multiple appearances ==
- Pamela Anderson: competed on the tenth and fifteenth American seasons, the seventh Argentinian season, and the ninth French season. She was additionally a guest on the sixth Israeli season.
- Helena Vondrackova: competed on first Slovak season and the sixth Polish season.
- Marcin Mroczek: competed on the fourth Polish season and the third Ukrainian season.
- Natalia Mohylevska: competed on the first, third and fourth Ukrainian seasons.
- Jamala: competed on the eighth Ukrainian season and the twenty-sixth Polish season.
- Jessica Gomes: competed on the Korean and Australian iterations.
- Rossy de Palma: competed on the first French season and the second Spanish season.
- Ian Ziering: competed on the fourth American season and the fifteenth French season.

== See also ==
- List of reality television show franchises
- Stars on the Floor (a competition show with a similar concept in the Philippines)
