= Marcus van Teijlingen =

Dutch dance instructor

Marcus van Teijlingen (born 20 March 1973 in Rijnsburg) is a Dutch dance instructor and professional Latin-American dancer. His regular dance partner was Nathalie Kip. He has been working full-time as a dance instructor in Groningen since 2004.

He became known due to his appearance on Dancing with the Stars in the Netherlands, reaching the second place, together with Irene van de Laar in the first season. During the second season he danced with Dutch ice-skater Barbara de Loor, and they won the competition. The year after, he won again, with his dance partner Helga van Leur.

Marcus was professional dance teacher at the dance school The Dance Factory in Groningen from 2004 until Juli 2005. As of May 2006 Marcus is no longer dancing with Nathalie Kip. Starting January 2007 he's partnered by Lena Mastenbroek.

Marcus still teaches throughout the Netherlands and has different projects he leads.

He is partnered with Marco Steiner from Switzerland.
