= María del Monte =

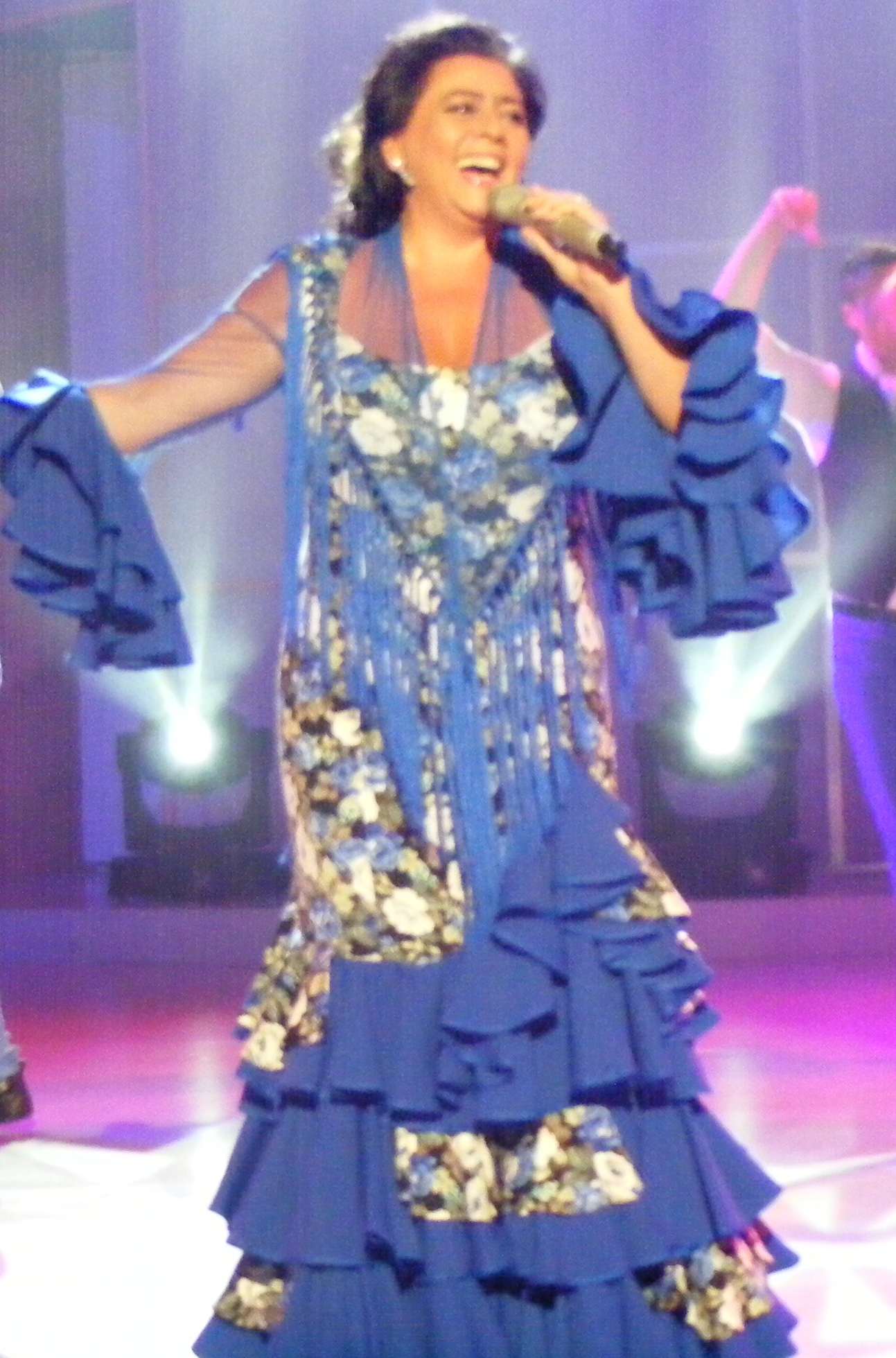

Background information
- Also known as: Reina de las Sevillanas (Sevillanas' Queen)
- Born: María del Monte Tejado Algaba; April 26, 1962 (age 63); Seville, Andalusia, Spain
- Genres: Copla; Sevillanas
- Occupations: Singer; TV and Radio hostess
- Instruments: Vocalist; Castanets
- Years active: 1982–present
- Spouse: Inmaculada Casal (m. 2022)

María del Monte Tejado Algaba (born 26 April 1962 in Seville, Andalusia) is a Spanish folk singer and TV and radio hostess. She's most known in Spain as "La Reina de las Sevillanas" (The Queen of the Sevillanas).

== Biography ==
María del Monte was born on 26 April 1962 in Seville, Andalusia. In 1982 won a TV contest show in Ceuta and thereafter released her first album. With the second one titled Cántame sevillanas being a hit in Spain and achieved triple Platinum disc (thirteen in her long career). In this album there's her most famous single: Cántame.

Also has worked in several TV and radio programs. In 1993 hosted Vamos juntos in Canal Sur Radio and three years later in Antena 3 in Al compás de la copla. In 1998 she appeared in TVE in a special TV-Show Esa copla me suena and Especial Feria de Abril.

She was linked romantically with another Spanish singer, Isabel Pantoja, for several years. Algaba is married to journalist Inmaculada Casal.

== Discography ==
- 1988 Cántame Sevillanas
- 1989 Besos de luna
- 1989 Acompañame
- 1991 Al Alba
- 1991 Ahora
- 1992 Con el Alma
- 1993 Reina de las sevillanas
- 1996 He Intentado Imaginar
- 1998 Cartas de Amor
- 1998 Digan lo que digan
- 1999 De Siempre: Antología de las Sevillanas volumen I
- 2000 El dolor del amor: Antología de las Sevillanas volumen II
- 2002 Con otro aire
- 2003 Cosas de la vida: Antología de las sevillanas Volumen III
- 2004 Olé, Olé
- 2005 Un Chaparrón
- 2011 Cómo te echo de menos
- 2022 Todo vuelve

== TV career ==
- Gente joven (1982), (TVE) - Contestant.
- Al compás de la copla (1996), (Antena 3)
- Esa copla me suena (1998), (TVE)
- Los debates de Hermida (2000), (Antena 3) - Talk show guest.
- La canción de mi querer (2000), (TVE)
- Cántame (2000), (Canal Sur) - Hostess
- Contigo (2000-2002), (Canal Sur) - Hostess
- Shalakabula (2005), (Canal Sur).
- El club de Flo (2006), (La Sexta) - Talk show guest
- La tarde con María (2007-2009), (Canal Sur) - Hostess
- ¿Dónde estás corazón? DEC (2011), (Antena 3), - Hostess.
- Tu cara me suena (2012-2013), (Antena 3), - Contestant.
- Uno de Los Nuestros (2013), (TVE), - Judgess.
- Tu cara me suena - Mini (2014), (Antena 3), - Tutor.
- Yo Soy del Sur (2016–2019), (Canal Sur) - Hostess
