= Jana Duļevska =

Latvian actress and television presenter

Jana Duļevska (born 12 June 1980 in Riga) is a Latvian actress and television presenter. She was the co-presenter of the Latvian version of the TV series Dancing with the Stars (Dejo ar zvaigzni! 3) in 2010 and I Love My Country (Es mīlu Tevi, Latvija!) 2014–2022.

Jana Duļevska is married to the former ice hockey player Rodrigo Laviņš.
