= Tanc so Zvezdite =

Reality TV Show

- Macedonian: Танц со Ѕвездите
- Presented by: Toni Mihajlovski; Marijana Stanojkovska
- Judges: Oliver Arsovski; Vlatko Pavleski; Milanka Rasik
- Country of origin: Macedonia
- No. of seasons: 2

Production
- Producer: Dream Factory
- Production locations: Skopje, Macedonia

Original release
- Network: MRT 1
- Release: 8 March 2013 – 2014

Tanc so Zvezdite (Macedonian: Танц со Ѕвездите) is the Macedonian version of the British reality TV competition Strictly Come Dancing and is part of the Dancing with the Stars franchise. The first season of the show started on 8 March 2013 and has been aired on MRT 1.

== Season 1 (2013) ==
=== Scores ===
Couple	Place	1	2	3	1+2+3	4	5	6	7	8	9	10
Atanas & Jovana	1	13	11	14	38	17		19	19	22	24+27=51	22+ =
Aleksandar & Marina	2	13	11	15	39	16		19	17	21	19+21=40	21+ =
Marijana & Ilija	3	16	13	15	44	15		21	21	23	20+23=43	26+ =
Jelena & Hristijan	4	11	17	17	45	14		19	16	20	24+ =	
Viktorija & Nermin	5	9	11	14	34	16		20	21			
Vasil & Nade	6	13	16	18	47	18		21				
Andrijana & Mišo	7	10	13	15	38	17						
Adelina & Vanco	8	9	14	16	39	13						
Branko & Simona	9	10	8	14	32							
Visar & Iva	10	9	10									

== Season 2 (2014) ==
=== Scores ===
Couple	Place	1	2	3	1+2+3	4	5	6	7	8	9	10
Nataša & Daniel	1	20	20				28	22				27
Sara & Mišo	2	19	18				22					28
Dimitar & Jovana	3	18	16				22					
Franc & Nade	4	13	19				19	23				
Vlatko & Marina	5	14	15				15					
Aleksandra & Ilija	6	15	14				18	21				
Nataša & Roland	7	14	16				18	—				
Stefan & Simona	8	15	15				—					
Martin & Ivana	9	17	13									
Marijana & Bobi	10	9	12									

=== Week 1 ===
Running order

Saturday Couple	Saturday Score	Saturday Dance	Sunday Couple	Sunday Score	Sunday Dance
Nataša & Roland	14 (6,5,3)	Cha-cha-cha	Nataša & Daniel	20 (7,8,5)	Quickstep
Franc & Nade	13 (4,6,3)	Jive	Sara & Mišo	19 (8,7,4)	Pasodoble
Marijana & Bobi	9 (3,4,2)	Quickstep	Vlatko & Marina	14 (6,5,3)	Rumba
Martin & Ivana	17 (6,7,4)	Waltz	Dimitar & Jovana	18 (7,7,4)	Tango
Stefan & Simona	15 (6,6,3)	Cha-cha-cha	Aleksandra & Ilija	15 (5,6,4)	Cha-cha-cha

=== Week 2 ===
Running order

Saturday Couple	Saturday Score	Saturday Dance	Sunday Couple	Sunday Score	Sunday Dance
Nataša & Daniel	20 (7,7,6)	Pasodoble	Dimitar & Jovana	16 (7,5,4)	Samba
Martin & Ivana	13 (4,5,4)	Jive	Vlatko & Marina	15 (5,5,5)	Quickstep
Stefan & Simona	15 (7,4,4)	Rumba	Aleksandra & Ilija	14 (4,5,5)	Tango
Sara & Mišo	18 (7,6,5)	Quickstep	Nataša & Roland	16 (5,6,5)	Tango
Marijana & Bobi	12 (5,3,4)	Samba	Franc & Nade	19 (7,7,5)	Rumba
