= Let's Dance – Kids (German TV series) =

- Genre: Reality competition
- Based on: Dancing with the Stars: Juniors; Let's Dance
- Presented by: Daniel Hartwich; Victoria Swarovski
- Judges: Joachim Llambi; Motsi Mabuse; Jorge González
- Opening theme: Pepe Lienhard Orchester – Let’s Dance TV Theme
- Country of origin: Germany
- Original language: German
- No. of seasons: 1
- No. of episodes: 4

Production
- Production locations: Cologne, Germany
- Production company: Seapoint Productions

Original release
- Network: TVNOW
- Release: 9 April – 30 April 2021
- Network: RTL
- Release: 16 May – 6 June 2021

Let's Dance – Kids is a German children's dance competition television series that premiered on April 9, 2021, on the premium sector TVNOW and on the television channel RTL, which premiered on May 16, 2021. It is a spin-off of the Let's Dance series and based on the American version Dancing with the Stars: Juniors. The format of the show features celebrity children (either in their own right or having celebrity parentage) paired with professional junior ballroom dancers and mentored by an adult professional dancer. The couples compete against each other by performing choreographed dance routines in front of a panel of judges.

The first Dancing Sternchen was Jona Szewczenko & Tizio Tiago Domingues da Silva and with Roberto Albanese as the coach.

== Cast ==
=== Hosts and judges ===
The show was originally presented from current hosts of Let’s Dance Daniel Hartwich and Victoria Swarovski and also the three judges were from the current season of Let’s Dance Joachim Llambi, Motsi Mabuse and Jorge González.

=== Couples and mentors ===
In April 2021, TVNOW and RTL announced the five celebrity kids, the professional partners and the coaches.

Celebrity	Notability (known for)	Professional partner	Coach	Status
Maris Ohneck	Erdoğan Atalay son	Jana Lebersky	Sergiu Luca	Eliminated 1st on May 16, 2021
Spencer König	Die Pfefferkörner actor	Selma Lohmann	Melissa Ortiz-Gomez	Eliminated 2nd on May 23, 2021
Zoé Baillieu	Gute Zeiten, schlechte Zeiten actress	Mischa Bakscheev	Regina Luca	Third place on May 30, 2021
Angelina Stecher-Williams	Judith Williams daughter	Erik Rettich	Victoria Kleinfelder-Cibis	Runner-up on June 6, 2021
Jona Szewczenko	Tanja Szewczenko daughter	Tizio Tiago Domingues da Silva	Roberto Albanese	Winner on June 6, 2021

== Scoring chart ==
Couple	Place	1	2	3	4
Jona & Tizio	1	27	26	30+9=39	29+30=59
Angelina & Erik	2	24	27	24+9=33	29+30=59
Zoé & Mischa	3	20	23	24+9=33	
Spencer & Selma	4	27	21		
Maris & Jana	5	17			

Red numbers indicates the lowest score for each week.
Green numbers indicates the highest score for each week.
indicates the couple eliminated that week.
indicates the returning couple that finished in the bottom two.
indicates the winning couple.
indicates the runner-up couple.

=== Averages ===
This table only counts for dances scored on a traditional 30-points scale.

Rank by Average	Place	Couple	Total points	Performances	Average
1	1	Jona & Tizio	142	5	28.4
2	2	Angelina & Erik	134	5	26.8
3	4	Spencer & Selma	48	2	24.0
4	3	Zoé & Mischa	67	3	22.3
5	5	Maris & Jana	17	1	17.0

== Highest and lowest scoring performances ==
The best and worst performances in each dance according to the judges' marks are as follows:

Dance	Best dancer(s)	Best score	Worst dancer(s)	Worst score
Quickstep	Spencer König	27	Zoé Baillieu	20
Jive	Jona Szewczenko	30	Maris Ohneck	17
Cha-Cha-Cha	Jona Szewczenko	29	Spencer König	21
Samba	Angelina Stecher-Williams	29	Angelina Stecher-Williams	24
Waltz	Zoé Baillieu	23		
Slowfox	Jona Szewczenko	26		
Viennese Waltz	Angelina Stecher-Williams	27		
Freestyle (Finale)	Angelina Stecher-Williams; Jona Szewczenko	30		

== Couples' highest and lowest scoring dances ==
According to the traditional 30-point scale.

Couples	Highest Scoring Dances	Score	Lowest Scoring Dances	Score
Jona & Tizio	Jive; Freestyle	30	Slowfox	26
Angelina & Erik	Freestyle	30	Samba; Cha-Cha-Cha	24
Zoé & Mischa	Cha-Cha-Cha	24	Quickstep	20
Spencer & Selma	Quickstep	27	Cha-Cha-Cha	21
Maris & Jana	Jive	17		

== Weekly scores and songs ==
=== Week 1: Summer Party ===
- Original airdate:
  - TVNOW: April 9, 2021
  - RTL: May 16, 2021

Running order

Order	Couple	Dance	Music	Judge's Scores			Total	Result
Order	Couple	Dance	Music	Gonzalez	Mabuse	Llambi	Total	Result
1	Zoé & Mischa	Quickstep	"Walking on Sunshine"–Katrina and the Waves	7	7	6	20	Bottom two
2	Maris & Jana	Jive	"Surfin' U.S.A."–The Beach Boys	6	6	5	17	Eliminated
3	Jona & Tizio	Cha-Cha-Cha	"Baby"–Justin Bieber ft. Ludacris	9	9	9	27	Safe
4	Spencer & Selma	Quickstep	"Hurra, hurra, die Schule brennt"–Extrabreit	10	9	8	27	Safe
5	Angelina & Erik	Samba	"La Isla Bonita"–Madonna	9	8	7	24	Safe

=== Week 2: Movie Night ===
- Original airdate:
  - TVNOW: April 16, 2021
  - RTL: May 23, 2021

Running order

Order	Couple	Dance	Music	Movie	Judge's Scores			Total	Result
Order	Couple	Dance	Music	Movie	Gonzalez	Mabuse	Llambi	Total	Result
1	Spencer & Selma	Cha-Cha-Cha	"The Power of Love"–Huey Lewis and the News	Back to the Future	8	7	6	21	Eliminated
2	Zoé & Mischa	Waltz	"Die Schöne und das Biest"–Peter Hofmann & Jana Werner	Beauty and the Beast	8	8	7	23	Safe
3	Jona & Tizio	Slowfox	"My Girl"–The Temptations	My Girl	9	9	8	26	Bottom two
4	Angelina & Erik	Viennese Waltz	"Hedwig's Theme"–John Williams	Harry Potter and the Philosopher's Stone	9	9	9	27	Safe

=== Week 3: Time Travel ===
- Original airdate:
  - TVNOW: April 23, 2021
  - RTL: May 30, 2021

Running order

Order	Couple	Dance	Music	Decade	Judge's Scores			Total	Result
Order	Couple	Dance	Music	Decade	Gonzalez	Mabuse	Llambi	Total	Result
1	Angelina & Erik	Cha-Cha-Cha	"Mamma Mia"–ABBA	1970's	8	8	8	24	Bottom two
2	Jona & Tizio	Jive	"We Go Together"–John Travolta & Olivia Newton-John	1950's	10	10	10	30	Safe
3	Zoé & Mischa	Cha-Cha-Cha	"Girls Just Want to Have Fun"–Cyndi Lauper	1980's	8	8	8	24	Eliminated
Paso Doble Dance-off
	Angelina & Erik; Jona & Tizio; Zoé & Mischa	Paso Doble	"He's A Pirate"–Klaus Badelt		9; 9; 9				

=== Week 4: Finale ===
- Original airdate:
  - TVNOW: April 30, 2021
  - RTL: June 6, 2021

Running order

Order	Couple	Dance	Music	Judge's Scores			Total	Result
Order	Couple	Dance	Music	Gonzalez	Mabuse	Llambi	Total	Result
1	Angelina & Erik	Samba	"Mas que Nada"–Jorge Ben	10	10	9	29	Runner-up
1	Angelina & Erik	Freestyle	"Colors of the Wind"–Judy Kuhn	10	10	10	30	Runner-up
2	Jona & Tizio	Cha-Cha-Cha	"Call Me Maybe"–Carly Rae Jepsen	10	10	9	29	Winner
2	Jona & Tizio	Freestyle	"Let It Go"–Idina Menzel	10	10	10	30	Winner

== Dance chart ==
Highest scoring dance
Lowest scoring dance

Couple	Week 1	Week 2	Week 3		Week 4	
Jona & Tizio	Cha-Cha-Cha	Slowfox	Jive	Paso Doble	Cha-Cha-Cha	Freestyle
Angelina & Erik	Samba	Viennese Waltz	Cha-Cha-Cha	Paso Doble	Samba	Freestyle
Zoé & Mischa	Quickstep	Waltz	Cha-Cha-Cha	Paso Doble		
Spencer & Selma	Quickstep	Cha-Cha-Cha				
Maris & Jana	Jive					
