= Andreas Solberg Wahl =

Norwegian physicist

Andreas Wahl
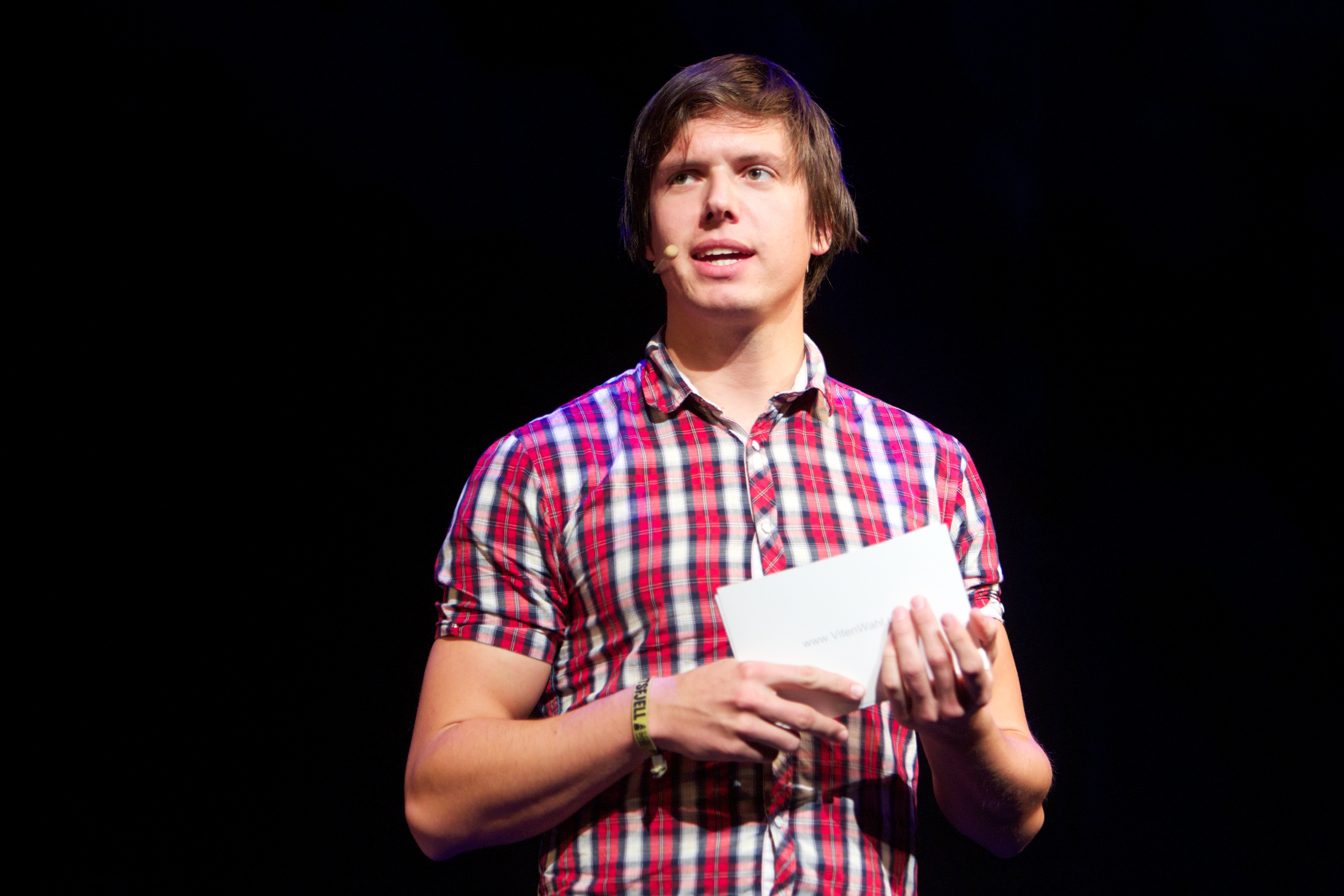
- Andreas Wahl hosts AppWorks. Photo: Eirik Helland Urke (2010)
- Born: 2 July 1983 (age 43); Bremen, West Germany
- Occupations: Physicist; Television presenter

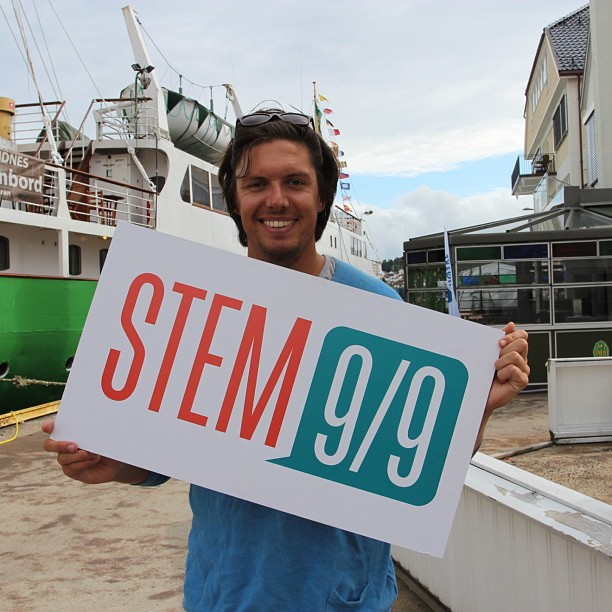
Wahl with a call to vote in the Norwegian parliamentary elections in 2013.

Andreas Wahl (born 2 July 1983) is a Norwegian physicist and professional communicator of science.

In the show Med livet som innsats, Andreas demonstrates the laws of physics by putting his life in high-risk situations. He was also the presenter of the TV-show Folkeopplysningen on the national broadcaster NRK1.

== Bibliography ==
- Hvorfor smelter ost, men ikke skinke?: barn spør.; (Why does cheese melt, but not ham?: Things children ask), 2015
- Fysikkmagi; (Magic with physics), 2013
- Nært - sært - spektakulært: 63 naturfaglige triks og eksperimenter; (Up close - peculiar - spectacular; 63 natural science tricks and experiments), 2010
