= Dancing Brasil Júnior =

- Genre: Reality competition
- Created by: BBC Worldwide
- Based on: Dancing with the Stars: Juniors
- Directed by: Rodrigo Carelli
- Presented by: Xuxa; Jean Paulo Campos
- Judges: Jaime Arôxa; Fernanda Chamma; Paulo Goulart Filho
- Country of origin: Brazil
- No. of episodes: 1

Production
- Camera setup: Multiple-camera
- Running time: 120 minutes
- Production companies: Endemol Shine; BBC Worldwide

Original release
- Network: RecordTV
- Release: 19 December 2018

Related
- Dancing Brasil

Dancing Brasil Júnior is a Brazilian children's reality television series based on the ABC celebrity dance competition Dancing with the Stars: Juniors, produced by Endemol Shine in partnership with BBC Worldwide.

The show features celebrity children (either in their own right or having celebrity parentage) paired with professional junior ballroom dancers and mentored by an adult professional dancer from the main show. The couples compete against each other by performing choreographed dance routines in front of a panel of judges.

Unlike its parent series, the public's involvement was limited to the direct in-studio audience members during the show's recording. Each audience member used a hand-held device to score each dancing team, with the team having the highest combined score overall (judges and studio) becoming the winner.

It aired on Wednesday, 19 December 2018 at 10:30 p.m. (BRT / AMT) on RecordTV originally as a stand-alone Dancing Brasil special but also intended as a backdoor pilot for a potential spin-off full series.

== Cast ==
=== Couples and mentors ===
Celebrity	Notability (known for)	Professional	Mentor	Status
Nathalia Costa	Actress	Lucas Nilvar	Carol Dias	Eliminated on December 19, 2018
Luiz Eduardo Toledo	Actor	Luana Najan	Alê Brandini	Eliminated on December 19, 2018
Maria Viel Faro	YouTuber	Matheus Cabrera	Thaiane Chuvas	Eliminated on December 19, 2018
Kaik Pereira	Actor	Isabella Lopes	Dani de Lova	Eliminated on December 19, 2018
Serginho Rufino	Actor	Manoella Aparecida	Fernando Perrotti	Eliminated on December 19, 2018
Lorena Tucci	Actress	Henrique Ribeiro	Bárbara Guerra	Eliminated on December 19, 2018
Matheus Ueta	Actor	Júlia Saba	Bruna Bays	Eliminated on December 19, 2018
Maria Clara de Rosis	Singer	Kelvyn Bertoni	Tutu Morasi	Third place on December 19, 2018
MC Soffia	Singer	Matheus Prado	Bella Fernandes	Runner-up on December 19, 2018
Leonardo Oliveira	Actor	Yasmim Nascimento	Marquinhos Costa	Winner on December 19, 2018

== Scoring chart ==
Couple	Place	1
Leonardo & Yasmin	1	30.0+9.3=39.3
Soffia & Matheus	2	30.0+9.2=39.2
Maria Clara & Kelvyn	3	30.0+8.9=38.9
Matheus & Júlia	4	30.0+8.8=38.8
Lorena & Henrique	5	29.0+9.3=38.3
Serginho & Manoella	6	28.0+9.0=37.0
Kaik & Isabella	7	27.0+9.1=36.1
Maria & Matheus	8	27.0+8.9=35.9
Luiz Eduardo & Luana	9	27.0+8.6=35.6
Nathalia & Lucas	10	27.0+8.4=35.4

Key
Lowest score
Highest score
Eliminated
Third place
Runner-up
Winner

== Scores ==
Individual judges' scores in the charts below (given in parentheses) are listed in this order from left to right: Jaime Arôxa, Fernanda Chamma, Paulo Goulart Filho.

The couples performed cha-cha-cha, pasodoble, samba, waltz or jive.

Running order

Couple	Scores	Dance	Music	Result
Serginho & Manoella	28 (10, 9, 9)	Cha-cha-cha	"Moves like Jagger"—Maroon 5 featuring Christina Aguilera	Eliminated
Maria & Matheus	27 (9, 9, 9)	Pasodoble	"The Edge of Glory"—Lady Gaga	Eliminated
Leonardo & Yasmin	30 (10, 10, 10)	Samba	"The Greatest"—Sia	Winner
Lorena & Henrique	29 (9, 10, 10)	Waltz	"Stone Cold"—Demi Lovato	Eliminated
Luiz Eduardo & Luana	27 (9, 9, 9)	Jive	"Hot n Cold"—The Baseballs	Eliminated
Nathalia & Lucas	27 (9, 9, 9)	Samba	"MMMBop"—Hanson	Eliminated
Kaik & Isabella	27 (9, 9, 9)	Pasodoble	"Rise"—Katy Perry	Eliminated
Maria Clara & Kelvyn	30 (10, 10, 10)	Cha-cha-cha	"Don't Stop the Music"—Rihanna	Third place
Matheus & Júlia	30 (10, 10, 10)	Waltz	"If I Knew"—Bruno Mars	Eliminated
Soffia & Matheus	30 (10, 10, 10)	Jive	"Shake It Off"—Taylor Swift	Runner-up

== Ratings and reception ==
=== Brazilian ratings ===
All numbers are in points and provided by Kantar Ibope Media.

Episode	Title	Air date	Timeslot (BRT)	SP viewers (in points)	Source
1	Dancing Brasil Junior	December 19, 2018	Wednesday 10:30 p.m.	6.8	

- In 2018, each point represents 248.647 households in 15 market cities in Brazil (71.855 households in São Paulo)
