= Jean Paulo Campos =

Brazilian actor (born 2003)

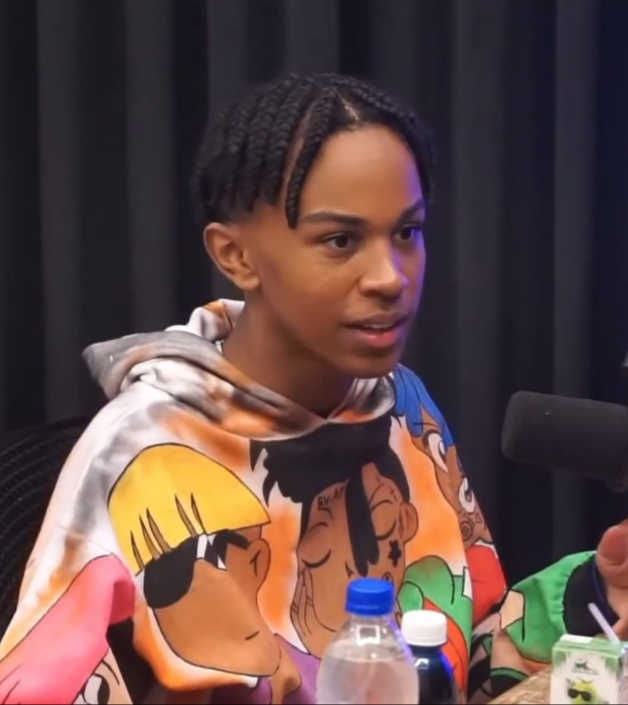
- Jean in 2021
- Born: Jean Paulo Campos; 13 April 2003 (age 23); São Paulo, Brazil
- Occupations: Actor; singer; TV host
- Years active: 2005–present

Jean Paulo Santos dos Campos (born 13 April 2003) is a Brazilian actor, singer and television host. He became known for playing Cirilo in the telenovela Carrossel. In 2014, he repeated the same role in the series Patrulha Salvadora.

== Filmography ==
=== Film ===
Year	Title	Role	Ref.
2015	Carrossel – O Filme	Cirilo Rivera	
2016	Carrossel 2: O Sumiço de Maria Joaquina	Cirilo Rivera	
2018	Exterminadores do Além Contra a Loira do Banheiro	Renato	
2022	Barraco de Família	Théo Dias	

=== Television ===
Year	Title	Role	Notes
2011	Amor e Revolução	João	Episode: "September 17th"
2012	Corações Feridos	Paulinho	
2012–13	Carrossel	Cirilo Rivera	
2014–15	Patrulha Salvadora	Cirilo Rivera	
2013	Bom Dia & Cia	Presenter	
2015	Mansão Bem Assombrada	Dudu	
2016	Dance se Puder	Participant	
2016–18	Carinha de Anjo	José Carlos "Zeca" de Oliveira	
2018	Dancing Brasil: Júnior	Reporter	
2018–21	Hoje em Dia	Reporter	
2020–21	Canta Comigo Teen	Juror	
2023	Vai na Fé	Yuri dos Santos	
2023	Vicky e a Musa	Michel	
2025	Dona de Mim	Yuri dos Santos	Guest

== Theater ==
Year	Title	Role	Ref.
2013	Carrossel no Circo Tihany	Cirilo Rivera	
2013	Forever King of Pop	Child Michael Jackson	
2018	Bring It On	Cameron	

== Discography ==
Year	Song	Album
2012	"Peraí"	Carrossel Vol. 2
2013	"Peraí (Remix)"	Carrossel Vol. 3 – Remixes
2014	"Muleke Doido"	Patrulha Salvadora
2016	"De Zero a Dez"	Carrossel 2
2016	"Majestade o Sabiá"	Carinha de Anjo
2016	"A Gente Corre Atrás"	Carinha de Anjo

== Awards and nominations ==
Year	Association	Category	Nominated work	Result	Ref.
2012	Troféu Raça Negra	Cultura Negra	Cirilo in Carrossel	Won	
2012	Prêmio Extra de Televisão	Revelação Infantil	Cirilo in Carrossel	Nominated	
2012	UOL Pop Tevê	Ator Revelação	Cirilo in Carrossel	Won	
2013	Troféu Imprensa	Revelação do Ano	Cirilo in Carrossel	Won	
2013	Prêmio Contigo! de TV	Melhor Ator Infantil	Cirilo in Carrossel	Won	
2014	Troféu Internet	Melhor Ator	Cirilo in Carrossel	Nominated	
2014	Troféu Imprensa	Melhor Ator	Cirilo in Carrossel	Nominated	
2020	Meme Awards	Melhor Artista em Meme	Memes Cirilo	Nominated	
