= Helga van Leur =

Dutch meteorologist (born 1970)

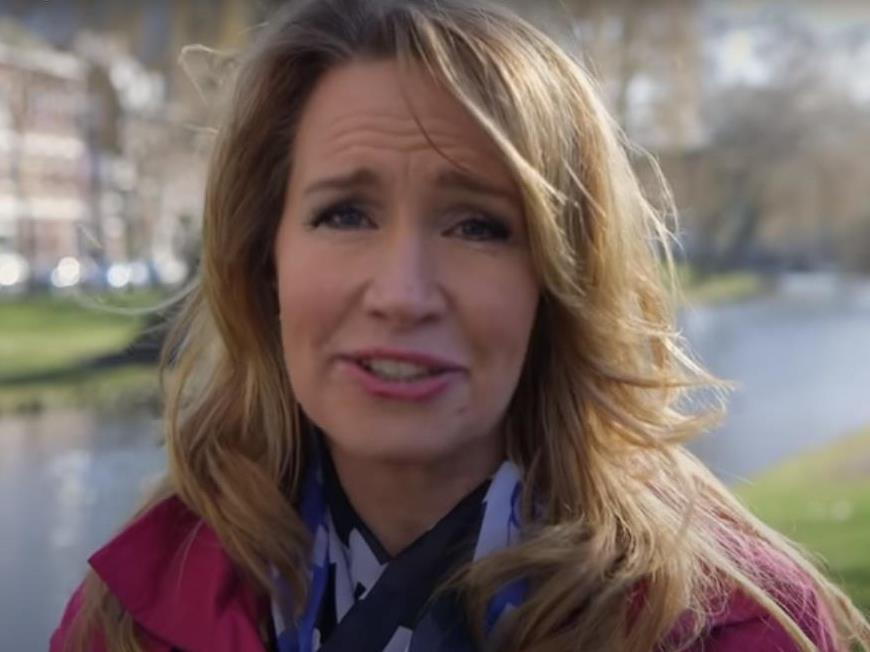
- Born: September 8, 1970 (age 56); Schoonhoven
- Website: http://helgavanleur.nl/

Helga van Leur (born 8 September 1970) is a Dutch meteorologist and weather presenter. Born in Schoonhoven, she is best known for presenting the weather predictions during the news broadcast at RTL 4.

Van Leur studied Bodem, Water en Atmosfeer (environmental studies) at Wageningen University. She started working in 1994 at Meteo Consult through an internship, where she produced weather predictions for newspapers, radio and television. Between 1997 and 2017, she worked (freelance) as one of the main weather presenters for the TV channels of RTL Nederland - most notably during the news broadcasts. She allegedly presented some 7000 weather messages during news broadcasts. In 1998 she was recognized by her colleagues as 'best weather presenter of the world', and she was elected most popular weather presenter of the Netherlands in 2008, 2010 and 2012.

She also writes articles and columns for newspapers and magazines and gives lectures on weather, climate and sustainability. She also participated in the Dutch edition of Dancing with the Stars in 2007, and won. Starting July 2017, she participates in a weekly weather bulletin at the late night talkshow 'RTL Summer Night'.

Van Leur is married, and has three children.
