= Dancing with the Stars (Thai TV series) =

- Season 1
- Celebrity winner: Timethai Plangsilp
- Professional winner: Pinklao Nararuk
- No. of episodes: 7 Episodes

Release
- Original network: BBTV Channel 7
- Original release: 8 January – 19 February 2013

Dancing with the Stars is a reality television show on BBTV Channel 7 in Thailand. The show is the Thai version of the British television series Strictly Come Dancing. Piyawat Kempetch and Morakot Kittisara, Miss Thailand Universe 2004, co-hosted the first season.

== Production ==
BBC announced the series on 13 November 2012, with production to be independently handled by Kantana Group and Metine Company Ltd. It was exclusively sponsored by Amari Hotels and Resorts, with the winner promised an executive package at the Amari Resort in Bangkok alongside a cash prize of ฿1,000,000.

In her role as producer, Metinee Kingpayome worked on set at Center Point Studio in the Soi Lasalle neighborhood of Bangkok. Initially, Sornram Theppitak had been chosen to co-host the show with Morakot Kittisara, but due to a scheduling conflict, he was replaced by Piyawat Kempetch.

During rehearsals, Nicole Theriault broke a rib, requiring her withdrawal from competition.

== Couples ==
The names of seven celebrity couples were revealed on December 17, 2012.

Contestants for season one
Celebrity	Occupation	Professional partner	Status
M.R. Malinee Chakrabandhu	Celebrity	Alonggod Nutsati	Eliminated 1st on January 22, 2013
Lek Isul	Actor and Model turned properties developer, co-founder of Zobiis.com	Poonyapa Dhanwilai; Suveenut Noinual(Weeks 3–4)	Eliminated 2nd on January 29, 2013
Natalie Glebova	2005 Miss Universe title holder & Entrepreneur	Ratjirote Prathumwan	Eliminated 3rd on February 5, 2013
Pol. Capt. Suebsak Phunsueb	Former Thai Sepaktakraw Player	Nartnalin Ruangsuttrakarn	Eliminated 4th on February 12, 2013
Nicole Theriault	Singer	Nattapat Runglaksa	3rd Place on February 13, 2013
Fonthip Watcharatrakul	2010 Miss Thailand Universe title holder & Actress	Watcharakorn Suasuebpan	Runners-up on February 19, 2013
Timethai Plangsilp	Singer under Kamikaze	Pinklao Nararuk	Winners on February 19, 2013

== Scoring chart ==
Season one contestants scoring chart
Team	Place	1	2	3	4	5	6	7
Timethai & Pinklao	1	—	20	20	24	25	24+23=47	29+30=59
Fonthip & Watcharakorn	2	—	19	23	20	24	23+24=47	25+27=52
Nicole & Nattapat	3	—	18	22	18	22	22+20=42	26+28=54
Suebsak & Nartnalin	4	—	20	19	21	22	21+20=41	
Natalie & Ratjirote	5	—	17	21	24	21		
Lek & Poonyapa	6	—	17	18	18			
Malinee & Alonggod	7	—	19	18				

Table key:

Red numbers indicate the lowest score for each week.
Green numbers indicate the highest score for each week.
indicates the couple (or couples) eliminated that week.
indicates the returning couple that finished in the bottom two (or bottom three).
indicates the returning couple that was the last to be called safe (they may or may have not been in the bottom two or three).
indicates the winning couple.
indicates the runner-up couple.
indicates the third-place couple.
indicates the couple withdrew.
indicates a couple that was eliminated in a dance-off.

=== Averages ===
Average points and ranking
Rank by average	Place	Couple	Total points	Number of dances	Average
1	1	Timethai & Pinklao	195	8	24.4
2	2	Fonthip & Watcharakorn	185	8	22.2
3	3	Nicole & Nattapat	176	8	22.0
4	5	Natilie & Rajote	83	4	20.8
5	4	Suebsak & Nartnalin	123	6	20.5
6	7	Malinee & Alonggod	37	2	18.5
7	6	Lek & Poonyapa	53	3	17.7

== Styles, scores and songs ==
=== Week 1 ===
Individual judges' scores in the chart below (given in parentheses) are listed in this order from left to right: Manaswee Kridtanukul, Amon Chatpaisal, Tinakorn Asvarak

Running order

Couple	Score	Style	Music
Malinee & Alonggod	-	Open show	"Gangnam Style"—PSY
Suebsak & Nartnalin	-	Open show	"Gangnam Style"—PSY
Nicole & Nattapat	-	Open show	"Gangnam Style"—PSY
Timethai & Pinklao	-	Open show	"Gangnam Style"—PSY
Natalie & Ratjirote	-	Open show	"Gangnam Style"—PSY
Lek & Suveenut	-	Open show	"Gangnam Style"—PSY
Fonthip & Watcharakorn	-	Open show	"Gangnam Style"—PSY

=== Week 2 ===
Individual judges' scores in the chart below (given in parentheses) are listed in this order from left to right: Manaswee Kridtanukul, Amon Chatpaisal, Tinakorn Asvarak

Running order

Couple	Score	Style	Music
Natalie & Ratjirote	17 (6,5,6)	Cha-Cha-Cha	"Bang Bang"—David Sanborn
Fonthip & Watcharakorn	19 (7,6,6)	Waltz	"To Where You Are"—Josh Groban
Lek & Suveenut	17 (6,6,5)	Cha-Cha-Cha	"Sex Bomb"—Tom Jones
Nicole & Nattapat	18 (6,6,6)	Waltz	"What a Wonderful World"—Louis Armstrong
Timethai & Pinklao	20 (7,6,7)	Cha-Cha-Cha	"Moves Like Jagger"—Maroon 5 feat. Christina Aguilera
Suebsak & Nartnalin	20 (7,6,7)	Waltz	"What the World Needs Now Is Love"—Burt Bacharach
Malinee & Alonggod	19 (6,6,7)	Cha-Cha-Cha	"Respect"—Aretha Franklin

=== Week 3 ===
Individual judges' scores in the chart below (given in parentheses) are listed in this order from left to right: Manaswee Kridtanukul, Amon Chatpaisal, Tinakorn Asvarak

Running order

Couple	Score	Dance	Music	Result
Malinee & Alonggod	18 (6,6,6)	Quickstep	"I Will Survive"— Gloria Gaynor	Eliminated
Suebsak & Nartnalin	19 (6,7,6)	Rumba	"How Deep Is Your Love"— Bee Gees	Safe
Nicole & Nattapat	22 (8,7,7)	Rumba	"I Just Can't Stop Loving You"— Michael Jackson	Safe
Timethai & Pinklao	20 (7,6,7)	Quickstep	"Baby"— Justin Bieber	Safe
Natalie & Ratjirote	21 (7,7,7)	Quickstep	"Crazy in Love"— Beyoncé	Safe
Lek & Suveenut	18 (6,6,6)	Quickstep	"Creep"— Radiohead	Bottom Two
Fonthip & Watcharakorn	23 (8,7,8)	Rumba	"Waiting for a Girl Like You"— Foreigner	Safe

=== Week 4 ===
Individual judges' scores in the chart below (given in parentheses) are listed in this order from left to right: Manaswee Kridtanukul, Amon Chatpaisal, Tinakorn Asvarak

Running order

Couple	Score	Dance	Music	Result
Suebsak & Nartnalin	21 (7,7,7)	Jive	"Livin' la Vida Loca"—Ricky Martin	Safe
Timethai & Pinklao	24 (8,8,8)	Tango	"เกรงใจ"—Raptor	Safe
Natalie & Ratjirote	24 (8,8,8)	Jive	"Proud Mary"—Ike & Tina Turner	Safe
Lek & Suveenut	18 (6,6,6)	Jive	"Born to Be Wild"—Steppenwolf	Eliminated
Fonthip & Watcharakorn	20 (7,7,6)	Tango	"Bad Romance"—Lady Gaga	Safe
Nicole & Nattapat	18 (6,6,6)	Tango	"สุดฤทธิ์สุดเดช"—Mai Charoenpura	Bottom Two

=== Week 5 ===
Individual judges' scores in the chart below (given in parentheses) are listed in this order from left to right: Manaswee Kridtanukul, Amon Chatpaisal, Tinakorn Asvarak

Running order

Couple	Score	Dance	Music	Result
Fonthip & Watcharakorn	24 (8,8,8)	Paso Doble	"Free Your Mind"—En Vogue	Safe
Timethai & Pinklao	25 (8,9,8)	Paso Doble	"We Will Rock You"—Queen	Safe
Suebsak & Nartnalin	22 (7,7,8)	Foxtrot	"Fever"—Michael Bublé	Bottom Two
Nicole & Nattapat	22 (8,7,7)	Paso Doble	"Frozen"—Madonna	Safe
Natalie & Ratjirote	21 (7,7,7)	Foxtrot	"One Thing"—One Direction	Eliminated

=== Week 6 Show 1 ===
Individual judges' scores in the chart below (given in parentheses) are listed in this order from left to right: Manaswee Kridtanukul, Amon Chatpaisal, Tinakorn Asvarak

Running order

Couple	Score	Style	Music
Nicole & Nattapat	22 (8,7,7)	Samba	"Want U Back"—Cher Lloyd
Timethai & Pinklao	24 (8,8,8)	Samba	"Conga"—Miami Sound Machine
Fonthip & Watcharakorn	23 (8,7,8)	Viennese Waltz	"Angel"—Sarah McLachlan
Suebsak & Nartnalin	21 (7,7,7)	Viennese Waltz	"When a Man Loves a Woman"—Michael Bolton

=== Week 6 Show 2 ===
Individual judges' scores in the chart below (given in parentheses) are listed in this order from left to right: Manaswee Kridtanukul, Amon Chatpaisal, Tinakorn Asvarak

Running order

Couple	Score	Dance	Music	Result
Fonthip & Watcharakorn	24 (8,8,8)	Samba	"Papi" –Jennifer Lopez	Safe
Nicole & Nattapat	20 (7,6,7)	Viennese Waltz	"Love Letters"—Ketty Lester	Safe
Timethai & Pinklao	23 (8,7,8)	Viennese Waltz	"I Have Nothing"—Whitney Houston	Bottom Two
Suebsak & Nartnalin	21 (7,7,7)	Samba	"Fine By Me"—Andy Grammer	Eliminated

=== Week 7 ===
Individual judges' scores in the chart below (given in parentheses) are listed in this order from left to right: Manaswee Kridtanukul, Amon Chatpaisal, Tinakorn Asvarak

Running order (Night 1)

Couple	Score	Dance	Music	Result
Fonthip & Watcharakorn	25 (8,8,9)	Paso Doble	"Free Your Mind"—En Vogue	Runner-up
Fonthip & Watcharakorn	27 (9,9,9)	Freestyle	"All I Ask of You"—Skrillex	Runner-up
Timethai & Pinklao	29 (9,10,10)	Paso Doble	"We Will Rock You"—Queen	Winner
Timethai & Pinklao	30 (10,10,10)	Freestyle	"If I Ain't Got You"—Alicia Keys	Winner
Nicole and Nappult	26(9,9,8)	Paso Doble	"Frozen"—Madonna	3rd Place
Nicole and Nappult	28 (9,10,9)	Freestyle	"That's My Goal"—Shayne Ward	3rd Place

== Dance chart ==
Highest scoring dance
Lowest scoring dance
Not performed due to illness

Couple	1	2	3	4	5	6		7	
Timethai & Pinklao	Freestyle	Cha-Cha-Cha	Quickstep	Jive	Paso Doble	Samba	Viennese Waltz	Paso Doble	Freestyle
Fonthip & Watcharakorn	Freestyle	Waltz	Rumba	Tango	Paso Doble	Viennese Waltz	Samba	Paso Doble	Freestyle
Nicole & Nattapat	Freestyle	Waltz	Rumba	Tango	Paso Doble	Samba	Viennese Waltz	Paso Doble	Freestyle
Suebsak & Nartnalin	Freestyle	Waltz	Rumba	Tango	Foxtrot	Viennese Waltz	Samba		
Natalie & Ratjirote	Freestyle	Cha-Cha-Cha	Quickstep	Jive	Foxtrot				
Lek & Poonyapa	Freestyle	Cha-Cha-Cha	Quickstep	Jive					
Malinee & Alonggod	Freestyle	Cha-Cha-Cha	Quickstep						

The dances performed during Series 1 were as follows:

- Week 1 : Open show (Freestyle)
- Week 2 : Cha Cha Cha or Waltz
- Week 3 : Quickstep or Rumba
- Week 4 : Jive or Tango
- Week 5 : Paso Doble or Foxtrot
- Week 6 : Samba & Viennese Waltz
- Week 7 : Paso Doble & Freestyle
