= Inmaculada Casal =

Spanish journalist and presenter (born 1964)

- Born: Inmaculada Casal Llamas; February 15, 1964 (age 62); Barcelona, Spain
- Education: University of Seville (Law degree); Faculty of Information Sciences (Complutense University of Madrid) (Information science degree with a major in Journalism)
- Occupations: Journalism, television presenter, speaker
- Years active: since 1984
- Employers: RTVE (1985–1987); Regional Government of Andalusia (1987–1988); Radio y Televisión de Andalucía (since 1988)

Inmaculada Casal Llamas (Barcelona, February 15, 1964) is a Spanish journalist and television presenter.

== Professional trajectory ==
Of Andalusian descent, she was born in Barcelona because her family had relocated to the city due to work.

She holds a degree in Information sciences with a major in Journalism from the Faculty of Information Sciences (Complutense University of Madrid) and studied —though did not complete— the Law degree. While at the university, she took her first steps in journalism in 1984 at the Sevilla Press agency and in 1985 at Telesur (RTVE Andalucía), where she served as the presenter of the program Andalucía junta for two years. Later, she worked at the General Directorate of Social Media of the Junta de Andalucía, the precursor to the Andalusian Radio and Television.

In 1988, she became the first contract signed at the Andalusian public radio and television, and the following year, she secured a permanent position through competitive examination as an editor for the News Services of Canal Sur Televisión. She began her professional career at Canal Sur TV as an editor in the Society Department of Canal Sur News and as the presenter of "Teledía," "Diario 1," and "Diario Fin de Semana". Later, she moved to the Courts Department as an editor and head of a section, where she stayed for three years. During this time, she also served as a correspondent for the Royal Household.

In 1997, she left the Courts Department and became the creator, director, and presenter of the program "Contraportada" on Canal Sur, which aired until March 2009. Simultaneously, between 2000 and 2002, she served as the deputy director of the prime-time program "Contigo" on Canal Sur. She has also hosted the Special Fair Programs on Canal Sur.

After the conclusion of "Contraportada", she returned to the Society Department of News and, a year later, hosted and directed the program "De lujo" for two seasons. Following the conclusion of this program, she once again returned to the Society Department of News and had her own blog from 2013 to 2018. A decade later, she was appointed as the editor-in-chief of the News Services at Canal Sur Televisión and served as the head of the Society Department of News.

Since November 2023, she has been the director and presenter of "Andalucía de tarde" on Canal Sur TV.
