= Dancing Brasil season 2 =

Dancing Brasil
- Season 2
- Celebrity winner: Yudi Tamashiro
- Professional winner: Bárbara Guerra
- No. of episodes: 10

Release
- Original network: RecordTV
- Original release: July 24 – September 25, 2017

Season chronology
- ← Previous; Season 1 Next → Season 3

The second season of Dancing Brasil premiered on Monday, July 24, 2017 at 10:30 p.m. (BRT / AMT) on RecordTV.

On September 25, 2017, TV host Yudi Tamashiro & Bárbara Guerra won the competition with 80.70% of the public vote over actress Suzana Alves & Tutu Morasi (10.02%) and singer Lexa & Lucas Teodoro (9.28%).

== Cast ==
=== Couples ===
Celebrity	Notability (known for)	Professional	Status
Fernando Pires	Singer	Bella Fernandes	Eliminated 1st on July 31, 2017
Jesus Luz	Model & DJ	Margreet Nuijten	Eliminated 2nd on August 7, 2017
Raphael Sander	Actor	Nay Fernandes	Eliminated 3rd on August 14, 2017
Theo Becker	Actor	Sarah Lage	Withdrew on August 21, 2017
Carlos Bonow	Actor	Dani De Lova	Eliminated 4th on August 21, 2017
Alinne Rosa	Singer	Ygor Zago	Eliminated 5th on September 4, 2017
Carla Prata	Model	Bruno Coman	Eliminated 6th on September 11, 2017
Jaque Carvalho	Volleyball player	Marcelo Vasquez	Eliminated 7th on September 18, 2017
Milene Domingues	Former football player	Rafael Machado	Eliminated 8th on September 18, 2017
Lexa	Singer	Lucas Teodoro	Third place on September 25, 2017
Suzana Alves	Actress	Tutu Morasi	Runner-up on September 25, 2017
Yudi Tamashiro	TV host	Bárbara Guerra	Winner on September 25, 2017

== Scoring chart ==
Couple	Place	1	2	1+2	3	4	5	6	7	8	9	10
Yudi & Bárbara	1	25	26	51	26	28	30	25	30	29+0=29	30+28=58	30+28=58
Suzana & Tutu	2	22	23	45	27	29	27	26	27	29+3=32	26+28=54	30+30=60
Lexa & Teo	3	20	21	41	23	21	26	26	24	25+3=28	28+24=52	30+27=57
Milene & Rafael	4	18	17	35	20	24	24	26	23	21+0=21	24+28=52	
Jaque & Marcelo	5	20	22	42	24	22	22	24	24	23+0=23	24+25=49	
Carla & Bruno	6	18	18	36	21	23	27	—	24	24+3=27		
Alinne & Ygor	7	17	20	37	20	23	27	—	20			
Bonow & Dani	8	17	20	37	21	24	24					
Theo & Sarah	9	17	19	36	21	—	—					
Raphael & Nay	10	19	18	37	20	22						
Jesus & Margreet	11	13	16	29	18							
Fernando & Bella	12	14	15	29								

Key
Lowest score
Highest score
Eliminated
Risk zone
Withdrew
Third place
Runner-up
Winner

== Weekly scores ==
Individual judges' scores in the charts below (given in parentheses) are listed in this order from left to right: Jaime Arôxa, Fernanda Chamma, Paulo Goulart Filho

=== Week 1: First Dances ===
The couples performed the cha-cha-cha, foxtrot, rumba or salsa.

Running order

Couple	Scores	Dance	Music	Result
Carla & Bruno	18 (7, 5, 6)	Rumba	"Waterfalls"—TLC	No elimination
Jesus & Margreet	13 (5, 4, 4)	Salsa	"In the Summertime"—Shaggy	No elimination
Suzana & Tutu	22 (8, 7, 7)	Foxtrot	"Fever"—Michael Bublé	No elimination
Bonow & Dani	17 (6, 5, 6)	Cha-cha-cha	"Kiss"—Prince	No elimination
Fernando & Bella	14 (5, 4, 5)	Rumba	"Say You Won't Let Go"—James Arthur	No elimination
Alinne & Ygor	17 (6, 5, 6)	Salsa	"Mania de Você"—Rita Lee	No elimination
Lexa & Teo	20 (7, 6, 7)	Cha-cha-cha	"Garota Nacional"—Skank	No elimination
Yudi & Bárbara	25 (9, 8, 8)	Foxtrot	"Feeling Good"—Michael Bublé	No elimination
Milene & Rafael	18 (7, 5, 6)	Rumba	"I'm Not the Only One"—Sam Smith	No elimination
Raphael & Nay	19 (7, 6, 6)	Cha-cha-cha	"Sugar"—Maroon 5	No elimination
Jaque & Marcelo	20 (7, 6, 7)	Foxtrot	"Tears Dry on Their Own"—Amy Winehouse	No elimination
Theo & Sarah	17 (6, 5, 6)	Salsa	"Hips Don't Lie"—Shakira featuring Wyclef Jean	No elimination

=== Week 2: Free Theme ===
The couples performed one unlearned dance. Jive and quickstep are introduced.

Running order

Couple	Scores	Dance	Music	Result
Yudi & Bárbara	26 (9, 9, 8)	Jive	"Hit the Road Jack"—Ray Charles	Safe
Jaque & Marcelo	22 (8, 7, 7)	Salsa	"Naughty Girl"—Beyoncé	Safe
Bonow & Dani	20 (7, 6, 7)	Quickstep	"For Once in My Life"—Stevie Wonder	Safe
Lexa & Teo	21 (7, 7, 7)	Foxtrot	"Dream a Little Dream of Me"—Emilia Mitiku	Safe
Jesus & Margreet	16 (6, 5, 5)	Rumba	"Only Love Can Hurt Like This"—Paloma Faith	Risk zone
Carla & Bruno	18 (6, 6, 6)	Jive	"Crazy Little Thing Called Love"—Queen	Safe
Suzana & Tutu	23 (7, 8, 8)	Rumba	"Could I Have This Kiss Forever"—Whitney Houston & Enrique Iglesias	Safe
Theo & Sarah	19 (7, 6, 6)	Cha-cha-cha	"Encontrar Alguém"—Jota Quest	Safe
Alinne & Ygor	20 (7, 6, 7)	Quickstep	"Shake It Off"—Taylor Swift	Safe
Fernando & Bella	15 (5, 5, 5)	Cha-cha-cha	"Tempos Modernos"—Lulu Santos	Eliminated
Milene & Rafael	17 (6, 5, 6)	Foxtrot	"Beautiful Day"—U2	Risk zone
Raphael & Nay	18 (6, 6, 6)	Salsa	"Livin' la Vida Loca"—Ricky Martin	Safe

=== Week 3: Musical Icons ===
The couples performed one unlearned dance to songs by musical icons. Waltz is introduced.

Running order

Couple	Scores	Dance	Music	Result
Lexa & Teo	23 (8, 7, 8)	Salsa	"Ni Tú Ni Yo"—Jennifer Lopez	Safe
Theo & Sarah	21 (7, 7, 7)	Jive	"Don't Stop Me Now"—Queen	Safe
Alinne & Ygor	20 (7, 6, 7)	Foxtrot	"Because You Loved Me"—Celine Dion	Risk zone
Yudi & Bárbara	26 (8, 9, 9)	Salsa	"Smooth Criminal"—Michael Jackson	Safe
Milene & Rafael	20 (7, 6, 7)	Quickstep	"Sorte Grande"—Ivete Sangalo	Risk zone
Raphael & Nay	20 (6, 7, 7)	Jive	"Jailhouse Rock"—Elvis Presley	Risk zone
Suzana & Tutu	27 (9, 9, 9)	Waltz	"Chovendo na Roseira"—Elis Regina	Safe
Jesus & Margreet	18 (6, 6, 6)	Foxtrot	"Theme from New York, New York"—Frank Sinatra	Eliminated
Jaque & Marcelo	24 (8, 8, 8)	Cha-cha-cha	"Poker Face"—Lady Gaga	Safe
Bonow & Dani	21 (7, 7, 7)	Rumba	"With or Without You"—U2	Safe
Carla & Bruno	21 (7, 7, 7)	Quickstep	"Umbrella"—Rihanna	Safe

=== Week 4: Oscars Night ===
The couples performed one unlearned dance to famous film songs that either won or were nominated on the Best Original Song category at The Oscars. Pasodoble is introduced.

Since Théo Becker suffered an ankle injury during week 3's performance, he and Sarah were unable to rehearse and also perform on this week's live show. As result, the couple was given a bye for the week.

Running order

Couple	Scores	Dance	Music	Film	Result
Suzana & Tutu	29 (10, 10, 9)	Jive	"Maniac"—Michael Sembello	Flashdance	Safe
Raphael & Nay	22 (8, 7, 7)	Rumba	"My Heart Will Go On"—Celine Dion	Titanic	Eliminated
Carla & Bruno	23 (7, 8, 8)	Foxtrot	"Raindrops Keep Fallin' on My Head"—B. J. Thomas	Butch Cassidy	Safe
Yudi & Bárbara	28 (9, 10, 9)	Rumba	"Can You Feel the Love Tonight"—Elton John	The Lion King	Safe
Jaque & Marcelo	22 (7, 7, 8)	Waltz	"Moon River"—Henry Mancini	Breakfast at Tiffany's	Risk zone
Milene & Rafael	24 (8, 8, 8)	Salsa	"Let's Hear It for the Boy"—Deniece Williams	Footloose	Safe
Lexa & Teo	21 (7, 7, 7)	Waltz	"You Light Up My Life"—Whitney Houston	You Light Up My Life	Risk zone
Alinne & Ygor	23 (8, 8, 7)	Rumba	"Have You Ever Really Loved a Woman?"—Bryan Adams	Don Juan DeMarco	Safe
Bonow & Dani	24 (8, 8, 8)	Pasodoble	"Eye of the Tiger"—Survivor	Rocky III	Safe

=== Week 5: The Musicals ===
The couples performed one unlearned musical theatre-inspired dance. Tango is introduced.

Théo Becker was again unable to rehearse and perform on this week's live show, which, according to the show's rules, meant he would have to withdraw from the competition.

Running order

Couple	Scores	Dance	Music	Musical	Result
Bonow & Dani	24 (8, 8, 8)	Foxtrot	"The Phantom of the Opera"	The Phantom of the Opera	Eliminated
Alinne & Ygor	27 (9, 9, 9)	Jive	"Move"	Dreamgirls	Safe
Carla & Bruno	27 (9, 9, 9)	Waltz	"Let's Go Fly a Kite"	Mary Poppins	Safe
Jaque & Marcelo	22 (7, 7, 8)	Tango	"Maybe This Time"	Cabaret	Risk zone
Milene & Rafael	24 (8, 8, 8)	Waltz	"Memory"	Cats	Risk zone
Yudi & Bárbara	30 (10, 10, 10)	Quickstep	"I Got Rhythm"	Crazy for You	Safe
Lexa & Teo	26 (8, 9, 9)	Tango	"Defying Gravity"	Wicked	Safe
Suzana & Tutu	27 (9, 9, 9)	Pasodoble	"At the End of the Day"	Les Misérables	Safe

=== Week 6: Circus Night ===
The couples performed one unlearned dance inspired by a Modern circus show.

Since Alinne Rosa injured her foot and Carla Prata stretched a muscle during week 6's rehearsals, both were unable to perform on this week's live show. As result, both celebrities and their partners were given a bye for the week.

The three-way tie between Lexa & Teo, Milene & Rafael and Suzana & Tutu at the top of the leaderboard sent all couples to the Risk zone. However, due to the unexpected injuries earlier in the week, the public vote was voided and all couples advanced directly to week 7.

Running order

Couple	Scores	Dance	Music	Result
Jaque & Marcelo	24 (8, 8, 8)	Pasodoble	"Storm"—Cirque du Soleil	Risk zone
Suzana & Tutu	26 (8, 9, 9)	Tango	"Hernando's Hideaway"—Carol Haney	Risk zone
Milene & Rafael	26 (8, 9, 9)	Jive	"Simple Joys"—Patina Miller	Risk zone
Yudi & Bárbara	25 (9, 8, 8)	Samba	"Piruetas"—Xuxa	Risk zone
Lexa & Teo	26 (9, 8, 9)	Quickstep	"The Hollywood Wiz"—Cirque du Soleil	Risk zone

=== Week 7: Latin Night ===
The couples performed one unlearned Latin-inspired dance routine.

Running order

Couple	Scores	Dance	Music	Result
Lexa & Teo	24 (8, 8, 8)	Jive	"Hey Ya!"—OutKast	Risk zone
Alinne & Ygor	20 (7, 6, 7)	Cha-cha-cha	"Firework"—Katy Perry	Eliminated
Jaque & Marcelo	24 (8, 8, 8)	Rumba	"Set Fire to the Rain"—Adele	Risk zone
Yudi & Bárbara	30 (10, 10, 10)	Pasodoble	"Another One Bites the Dust"—Queen	Safe
Carla & Bruno	24 (8, 8, 8)	Salsa	"Circus"—Britney Spears	Risk zone
Milene & Rafael	23 (8, 7, 8)	Pasodoble	"Malagueña"—Ernesto Lecuona	Risk zone
Suzana & Tutu	27 (9, 9, 9)	Cha-cha-cha	"Sway"—The Pussycat Dolls	Safe

=== Week 8: Brazil Night ===
The couples performed one unlearned dance to classic Brazilian songs.

Running order

Couple	Scores	Dance	Music	Result
Milene & Rafael	21 (7, 7, 7)	Tango	"Sandra Rosa Madalena"—Sidney Magal	Risk zone
Suzana & Tutu	29 (9, 10, 10)	Quickstep	"Brasileirinho"—Waldir Azevedo	Safe
Carla & Bruno	24 (8, 8, 8)	Cha-cha-cha	"Um Certo Alguém"—Lulu Santos	Eliminated
Yudi & Bárbara	29 (9, 10, 10)	Waltz	"Rosa"—Pixinguinha	Safe
Lexa & Teo	25 (8, 9, 8)	Pasodoble	"Sangue Latino"—Secos & Molhados	Safe
Jaque & Marcelo	23 (7, 8, 8)	Samba	"Mas que Nada"—Jorge Ben Jor	Risk zone

Midway through the show, the six couples participated in dance-offs designed and coached by one of the three judges, with the winners receiving three points to be added to their total scores. Zouk, jazz and contemporary are introduced.

Judge's Dance-offs
Couple	Judge	Judges' votes	Dance	Music	Result
Carla & Bruno	Jaime Arôxa	Carla, Carla, Carla	Zouk	"Swalla"—Jason Derulo featuring Nicki Minaj	Winner (3 pts)
Milene & Rafael	Jaime Arôxa	Carla, Carla, Carla	Zouk	"Swalla"—Jason Derulo featuring Nicki Minaj	Loser
Jaque & Marcelo	Fernanda Chamma	Suzana, Suzana, Suzana	Jazz	"On Broadway"—George Benson	Loser
Suzana & Tutu	Fernanda Chamma	Suzana, Suzana, Suzana	Jazz	"On Broadway"—George Benson	Winner (3 pts)
Lexa & Teo	Paulo Goulart Filho	Lexa, Lexa, Lexa	Contemporary	"Titanium"—Madilyn Bailey	Winner (3 pts)
Yudi & Bárbara	Paulo Goulart Filho	Lexa, Lexa, Lexa	Contemporary	"Titanium"—Madilyn Bailey	Loser

=== Week 9: Semifinals ===
The couples performed their final two unlearned dances.

Running order

Couple	Scores	Dance	Music	Result
Milene & Rafael	24 (8, 8, 8)	Samba	"I Want You Back"—The Jackson 5	Eliminated
Milene & Rafael	28 (10, 9, 9)	Cha-cha-cha	"Don't You Worry 'bout a Thing"—Tori Kelly	Eliminated
Jaque & Marcelo	24 (8, 8, 8)	Jive	"Tightrope"—Janelle Monáe	Eliminated
Jaque & Marcelo	25 (8, 9, 8)	Quickstep	"Wake Me Up"—Avicii	Eliminated
Yudi & Bárbara	30 (10, 10, 10)	Cha-cha-cha	"Mercy"—Duffy	Safe
Yudi & Bárbara	28 (9, 10, 9)	Tango	"Sweet Dreams (Are Made of This)"—Eurythmics	Safe
Suzana & Tutu	26 (8, 9, 9)	Samba	"Jazz Machine"—Black Machine	Safe
Suzana & Tutu	28 (8, 10, 10)	Salsa	"Wild Thoughts"—DJ Khaled featuring Rihanna	Safe
Lexa & Teo	28 (9, 9, 10)	Samba	"Instruction"—Jax Jones featuring Demi Lovato	Risk zone
Lexa & Teo	24 (8, 8, 8)	Rumba	"Emotion"—Destiny's Child	Risk zone

=== Week 10: Finals ===
The couples performed a redemption dance and a showdance that fused three previously learned dance styles.

Running order

Couple	Scores	Dance	Music	Result
Suzana & Tutu	30 (10, 10, 10)	Rumba	"One Moment in Time"—Whitney Houston	Runner-up
Suzana & Tutu	30 (10, 10, 10)	Showdance	"There's Nothing Holdin' Me Back"—Shawn Mendes	Runner-up
Lexa & Teo	30 (10, 10, 10)	Jive	"Wake Me Up Before You Go-Go"—Wham!	Third place
Lexa & Teo	27 (9, 9, 9)	Showdance	"Sweet Child o' Mine"—Guns N' Roses	Third place
Yudi & Bárbara	30 (10, 10, 10)	Rumba	"Because of You"—Kelly Clarkson	Winner
Yudi & Bárbara	28 (9, 10, 9)	Showdance	"Uptown Funk"—Mark Ronson featuring Bruno Mars	Winner

== Dance chart ==
- Week 1: One unlearned dance (First Dances)
- Week 2: One unlearned dance (Free Theme)
- Week 3: One unlearned dance (Musical Icons)
- Week 4: One unlearned dance (Oscars Night)
- Week 5: One unlearned dance (The Musicals)
- Week 6: One unlearned dance (Circus Night)
- Week 7: One unlearned dance (Latin Night)
- Week 8: One unlearned dance & dance-off challenge (Brazil Night)
- Week 9: Two unlearned dances (Semifinals)
- Week 10: Redemption dance & showdance (Finals)

== Ratings and reception ==
=== Brazilian ratings ===
All numbers are in points and provided by Kantar Ibope Media.

Episode	Title	Air date	Timeslot (BRT)	SP viewers (in points)	Source
1	Week 1	July 24, 2017	Monday 10:30 p.m.	6.3	
2	Week 2	July 31, 2017	Monday 10:30 p.m.	5.6	
3	Week 3	August 7, 2017	Monday 10:30 p.m.	5.6	
4	Week 4	August 14, 2017	Monday 10:30 p.m.	5.4	
5	Week 5	August 21, 2017	Monday 10:30 p.m.	5.6	
6	Week 6	August 28, 2017	Monday 10:30 p.m.	5.3	
7	Week 7	September 4, 2017	Monday 10:30 p.m.	5.1	
8	Week 8	September 11, 2017	Monday 10:30 p.m.	6.1	
9	Week 9	September 18, 2017	Monday 10:45 p.m.	5.4	
10	Winner announced	September 25, 2017	Monday 10:45 p.m.	7.8	

- In 2017, each point represents 245.700 households in 15 market cities in Brazil (70.500 households in São Paulo).
