= Dancing Brasil season 3 =

Dancing Brasil
- Season 3
- Celebrity winner: Geovanna Tominaga
- Professional winner: Lucas Teodoro
- No. of episodes: 13

Release
- Original network: RecordTV
- Original release: January 17 – April 11, 2018

Season chronology
- ← Previous; Season 2 Next → Season 4

The third season of Dancing Brasil premiered on Wednesday, January 17, 2018 at 10:30 p.m. (BRT / AMT) on RecordTV.

On April 11, 2018, TV host Geovanna Tominaga & Lucas Teodoro won the competition with 34.82% of the public vote over model Raissa Santana & Paulo Victor Souza (32.91%) and actress Bárbara Borges & Marquinhos Costa (32.27%). This was the first season to feature an all-female final three.

== Cast ==
=== Couples ===
| Celebrity | Notability (known for) | Professional | Status |
|---|---|---|---|
| Bruno Chateaubriand | Journalist | Carol Dias | Eliminated 1st on January 24, 2018 |
| Popó | Former boxer | Alê Brandini | Eliminated 2nd on January 31, 2018 |
| Bárbara Evans | Actress | Tutu Morasi | Eliminated 3rd on February 7, 2018 |
| Sebá | Singer | Bruna Bays | Eliminated 4th on February 14, 2018 |
| Diogo Sales | Actor | Bella Fernandes | Eliminated 5th on February 21, 2018 |
| Douglas Sampaio | Actor | Sarah Lage | Eliminated 6th on February 28, 2018 |
| Isabel Fillardis | Actress | Caio Vini | Eliminated 7th on March 7, 2018 |
| Hylka Maria | Actress | Fernando Perrotti | Eliminated 8th on March 14, 2018 |
| Joanna Maranhão | Swimmer | Bruno Coman | Eliminated 9th on March 21, 2018 |
| Dudu Pelizzari | Actor | Dani De Lova | Eliminated 10th on March 28, 2018 |
| Marina Elali | Singer | Jefferson Andrade | Eliminated 11th on April 4, 2018 |
| Rodrigo Capella | Comedian | Flavia Café | Eliminated 12th on April 4, 2018 |
| Bárbara Borges | Actress | Marquinhos Costa | Third place on April 11, 2018 |
| Raissa Santana | Model | Paulo Victor Souza | Runner-up on April 11, 2018 |
| Geovanna Tominaga | TV host | Lucas Teodoro | Winner on April 11, 2018 |

== Scoring chart ==
| Couple | Place | 1 | 2 | 1+2 | 3 | 4 | 5 | 6 | 7 | 8 | 9 | 10 | 11 | 12 | 13 |
|---|---|---|---|---|---|---|---|---|---|---|---|---|---|---|---|
| Geovanna & Teo | 1 | 24 | 24 | 48 | 24 | 29 | 29 | 27 | 29+3=32 | 27 | 30 | 24 | 40 | 26+30=56 | 30+27+30=87 |
| Raissa & Paulo Victor | 2 | 20 | 24 | 44 | 27 | 23 | 26 | 25 | 27+0=27 | 30 | 21 | 25 | 33 | 27+26=53 | 30+26+28=84 |
| Bárbara & Marquinhos | 3 | 21 | 24 | 45 | 22 | 22 | 24 | 30 | 25+3=28 | 26 | 29 | 30 | 35 | 25+24=49 | 30+29+30=89 |
| Rodrigo & Flavia | 4 | 21 | 24 | 45 | 18 | 24 | 26 | 26 | 27+3=30 | 21 | 25 | 27 | 31 | 23+26=49 | |
| Marina & Jefferson | 5 | 21 | 24 | 45 | 27 | 23 | 27 | 24 | 21+0=21 | 27 | 27 | 22 | 38 | 21+25=46 | |
| Dudu & Dani | 6 | 21 | 23 | 44 | 24 | 23 | 25 | 25 | 27+0=27 | 23 | 24 | 27 | 32 | | |
| Joanna & Bruno | 7 | 20 | 20 | 40 | 22 | 24 | 25 | 27 | 22+3=25 | 21 | 25 | 24 | | | |
| Hylka & Fernando | 8 | 20 | 21 | 41 | 23 | 27 | 27 | 30 | 26+3=29 | 28 | 24 | | | | |
| Isabel & Caio | 9 | 18 | 21 | 39 | 21 | 23 | 22 | 23 | 25+0=25 | 21 | | | | | |
| Douglas & Sarah | 10 | 17 | 19 | 36 | 23 | 21 | 27 | 21 | 21+0=21 | | | | | | |
| Diogo & Bella | 11 | 18 | 19 | 37 | 18 | 28 | 23 | 22 | | | | | | | |
| Sebá & Bruna | 12 | 19 | 19 | 38 | 25 | 22 | 22 | | | | | | | | |
| Bárbara & Tutu | 13 | 16 | 22 | 38 | 21 | 21 | | | | | | | | | |
| Popó & Alê | 14 | 18 | 18 | 36 | 19 | | | | | | | | | | |
| Bruno & Carol | 15 | 19 | 18 | 37 | | | | | | | | | | | |

Key
Lowest score
Highest score
Eliminated
Risk zone
Immunity
Third place
Runner-up
Winner

== Weekly scores ==
Individual judges' scores in the charts below (given in parentheses) are listed in this order from left to right: Jaime Arôxa, Fernanda Chamma, Paulo Goulart Filho.

=== Week 1: First Dances ===
The couples performed rumba, forró, samba, salsa, foxtrot, pasodoble, cha-cha-cha, tango or jive.

Running order

| Couple | Scores | Dance | Music | Result |
|---|---|---|---|---|
| Raíssa & Paulo Victor | 20 (7, 7, 6) | Rumba | "One"—U2 & Mary J. Blige | No elimination |
| Rodrigo & Flávia | 21 (7, 7, 7) | Forró | "Boa Sorte / Good Luck"—Vanessa da Matta | No elimination |
| Isabel & Caio | 18 (6, 6, 6) | Samba | "Survivor"—Destiny's Child | No elimination |
| Popó & Alê | 18 (6, 6, 6) | Salsa | "Súbeme la Radio"—Enrique Iglesias | No elimination |
| Geovanna & Teo | 24 (8, 8, 8) | Foxtrot | "Believe"—Cher | No elimination |
| Dudu & Dani | 21 (7, 7, 7) | Pasodoble | "Live and Let Die"—Paul McCartney and Wings | No elimination |
| Marina & Jefferson | 21 (8, 6, 7) | Cha-cha-cha | "Call Me Maybe"—Carly Rae Jepsen | No elimination |
| Bruno & Carol | 19 (7, 6, 6) | Tango | "Ainda Bem"—Marisa Monte | No elimination |
| Bárbara & Tutu | 16 (6, 5, 5) | Cha-cha-cha | "Cake by the Ocean"—DNCE | No elimination |
| Diogo & Bella | 18 (6, 6, 6) | Salsa | "Groove Is in the Heart"—Deee-Lite | No elimination |
| Bárbara & Marquinhos | 21 (7, 7, 7) | Samba | "Superstition"—Stevie Wonder | No elimination |
| Douglas & Sarah | 17 (6, 5, 6) | Jive | "Last Nite"—The Strokes | No elimination |
| Hylka & Fernando | 20 (7, 6, 7) | Tango | "Love Runs Out"—OneRepublic | No elimination |
| Sebá & Bruna | 19 (7, 6, 6) | Salsa | "Clocks"—Coldplay | No elimination |
| Joanna & Bruno | 20 (7, 6, 7) | Foxtrot | "Someone like You"—Adele | No elimination |

=== Week 2: Movie Night ===
The couples performed one unlearned dance to famous film songs. Waltz is introduced.

Running order

| Couple | Scores | Dance | Music | Film | Result |
|---|---|---|---|---|---|
| Diogo & Bella | 19 (7, 6, 6) | Pasodoble | "Theme from Mission: Impossible"—Adam Clayton | Mission: Impossible | Risk zone |
| Bárbara & Tutu | 22 (7, 7, 8) | Tango | "Misirlou"—Dick Dale | Pulp Fiction | Safe |
| Sebá & Bruna | 19 (7, 6, 6) | Rumba | "Take My Breath Away"—Berlin | Top Gun | Safe |
| Marina & Jefferson | 24 (8, 8, 8) | Waltz | "A Thousand Years"—Christina Perri | Breaking Dawn – Part 1 | Safe |
| Douglas & Sarah | 19 (6, 6, 7) | Samba | "Stayin' Alive"—Bee Gees | Saturday Night Fever | Risk zone |
| Bárbara & Marquinhos | 24 (8, 8, 8) | Cha-cha-cha | "Mamma Mia"—ABBA | Mamma Mia! | Safe |
| Popó & Alê | 18 (6, 6, 6) | Pasodoble | "Gonna Fly Now"—Bill Conti | Rocky | Risk zone |
| Raíssa & Paulo Victor | 24 (8, 8, 8) | Tango | "Oh, Pretty Woman"—Roy Orbison | Pretty Woman | Safe |
| Dudu & Dani | 23 (7, 8, 8) | Forró | "Esperando na Janela"—Gilberto Gil | Eu, Tu, Eles | Safe |
| Joanna & Bruno | 20 (7, 6, 7) | Pasodoble | "We Don't Need Another Hero"—Tina Turner | Mad Max 3 | Safe |
| Geovanna & Teo | 24 (8, 8, 8) | Cha-cha-cha | "Super Freak"—Rick James | Little Miss Sunshine | Safe |
| Isabel & Caio | 21 (7, 7, 7) | Rumba | "I Will Always Love You"—Whitney Houston | The Bodyguard | Safe |
| Rodrigo & Flávia | 24 (8, 8, 8) | Jive | "The Heat Is On"—Glenn Frey | Beverly Hills Cop | Safe |
| Bruno & Carol | 18 (6, 6, 6) | Cha-cha-cha | "Ghostbusters"—Ray Parker Jr. | Ghostbusters | Eliminated |
| Hylka & Fernando | 21 (7, 7, 7) | Foxtrot | "I Say a Little Prayer"—Diana King | My Best Friend's Wedding | Safe |

=== Week 3: 80s Night ===
The couples performed one unlearned dance to famous 80s songs. Zouk and quickstep are introduced.

Running order

| Couple | Scores | Dance | Music | Result |
|---|---|---|---|---|
| Bárbara & Marquinhos | 22 (8, 7, 7) | Tango | "Beat It"—Michael Jackson | Safe |
| Popó & Alê | 19 (7, 6, 6) | Cha-cha-cha | "There Must Be an Angel"—Eurythmics | Eliminated |
| Hylka & Fernando | 23 (8, 7, 8) | Zouk | "La Isla Bonita"—Madonna | Safe |
| Diogo & Bella | 18 (6, 6, 6) | Waltz | "Never Tear Us Apart"—INXS | Risk zone |
| Isabel & Caio | 21 (7, 7, 7) | Cha-cha-cha | "Smooth Operator"—Sade | Safe |
| Sebá & Bruna | 25 (9, 8, 8) | Jive | "We're Not Gonna Take It"—Twisted Sister | Safe |
| Marina & Jefferson | 27 (9, 9, 9) | Salsa | "Baila Comigo"—Rita Lee | Safe |
| Douglas & Sarah | 23 (7, 8, 8) | Cha-cha-cha | "Just Can't Get Enough"—Depeche Mode | Safe |
| Geovanna & Teo | 24 (7, 9, 8) | Forró | "Palco"—Gilberto Gil | Safe |
| Joanna & Bruno | 22 (7, 7, 8) | Tango | "Under Pressure"—Queen & David Bowie | Safe |
| Raíssa & Paulo Victor | 27 (9, 9, 9) | Pasodoble | "Because the Night"—Patti Smith | Safe |
| Rodrigo & Flávia | 18 (6, 6, 6) | Samba | "A Little Respect"—Erasure | Risk zone |
| Bárbara & Tutu | 21 (7, 7, 7) | Quickstep | "Karma Chameleon"—Culture Club | Safe |
| Dudu & Dani | 24 (8, 8, 8) | Jive | "Love Shack"—The B-52's | Safe |

=== Week 4: Masquerade Ball ===
The couples performed one unlearned masquerade ball-inspired dance.

Running order

| Couple | Scores | Dance | Music | Result |
|---|---|---|---|---|
| Geovanna & Teo | 29 (9, 10, 10) | Waltz | "Fly Away From Here"—Aerosmith | Safe |
| Joanna e Bruno | 24 (8, 8, 8) | Cha-cha-cha | "SexyBack"—Justin Timberlake | Safe |
| Douglas & Sarah | 21 (7, 7, 7) | Tango | "Somebody That I Used to Know"—Gotye | Risk zone |
| Bárbara & Tutu | 21 (7, 7, 7) | Rumba | "I Try"—Macy Gray | Eliminated |
| Sebá & Bruna | 22 (7, 7, 8) | Waltz | "Kiss from a Rose"—Seal | Risk zone |
| Hylka & Fernando | 27 (9, 9, 9) | Samba | "Mambo No. 5"—Lou Bega | Safe |
| Isabel & Caio | 23 (8, 7, 8) | Foxtrot | "People Are Strange"—The Doors | Safe |
| Diogo & Bella | 28 (10, 9, 9) | Cha-cha-cha | "Let's Groove"—Earth, Wind & Fire | Safe |
| Marina & Jefferson | 23 (8, 8, 7) | Samba | "Yeah!"—Usher | Safe |
| Dudu & Dani | 23 (7, 8, 8) | Quickstep | "Je veux"—Zaz | Safe |
| Bárbara & Marquinhos | 22 (7, 8, 7) | Foxtrot | "Suspicious Minds"—Elvis Presley | Risk zone |
| Rodrigo & Flávia | 24 (8, 8, 8) | Waltz | "Beija Eu"—Marisa Monte | Safe |
| Raíssa & Paulo Victor | 23 (7, 8, 8) | Jive | "Candyman"—Christina Aguilera | Safe |

=== Week 5: Life Moments ===
The couples performed one unlearned dance to celebrate the most memorable moment of their lives.

Running order

| Couple | Scores | Dance | Music | Result |
|---|---|---|---|---|
| Marina & Jefferson | 27 (9, 9, 9) | Tango | "Like a Virgin"—Madonna | Safe |
| Dudu & Dani | 25 (8, 9, 8) | Samba | "Brasil Pandeiro"—Novos Baianos | Safe |
| Hylka & Fernando | 27 (9, 9, 9) | Rumba | "Fast Car"—Tracy Chapman | Safe |
| Douglas & Sarah | 27 (9, 9, 9) | Pasodoble | "Holiday"—Green Day | Safe |
| Isabel & Caio | 22 (7, 8, 7) | Forró | "Ai, que Saudade d'Ocê"—Alceu Valença | Risk zone |
| Joanna & Bruno | 25 (8, 8, 9) | Waltz | "Estrelas"—Oswaldo Montenegro | Safe |
| Sebá & Bruna | 22 (7, 8, 7) | Samba | "Faixa Amarela"—Zeca Pagodinho | Eliminated |
| Raíssa & Paulo Victor | 26 (8, 9, 9) | Zouk | "Fuckin' Perfect"—Pink | Safe |
| Rodrigo & Flávia | 26 (8, 9, 9) | Tango | "Home"—Daughtry | Safe |
| Bárbara & Marquinhos | 24 (8, 8, 8) | Forró | "Shiny Happy People"—R.E.M. | Safe |
| Diogo & Bella | 23 (7, 8, 8) | Zouk | "Superstar"—Lauren Hill | Risk zone |
| Geovanna & Teo | 29 (9, 10, 10) | Jive | "Blue Suede Shoes"—Elvis Presley | Safe |

=== Week 6: Free Theme ===
Running order

| Couple | Scores | Dance | Music | Result |
|---|---|---|---|---|
| Geovanna & Teo | 27 (9, 9, 9) | Salsa | "Danza Kuduro"—Don Omar featuring Lucenzo | Safe |
| Diogo & Bella | 22 (8, 7, 7) | Tango | "El Tango de Roxanne"—Ewan McGregor, José Feliciano & Jacek Koman | Eliminated |
| Raíssa & Paulo Victor | 25 (9, 8, 8) | Foxtrot | "I Don't Wanna Lose You"—Tina Turner | Safe |
| Isabel & Caio | 23 (7, 8, 8) | Waltz | "Can't Help Falling in Love"—Elvis Presley | Risk zone |
| Douglas & Sarah | 21 (7, 7, 7) | Zouk | "Try"—Pink | Risk zone |
| Marina & Jefferson | 24 (8, 8, 8) | Jive | "Bang Bang"—Jessie J, Ariana Grande & Nicki Minaj | Safe |
| Dudu & Dani | 25 (8, 9, 8) | Tango | "Cry Me a River"—Justin Timberlake | Safe |
| Bárbara & Marquinhos | 30 (10, 10, 10) | Contemporary | "Chandelier"—Sia | Safe |
| Hylka & Fernando | 30 (10, 10, 10) | Pasodoble | "You Give Love a Bad Name"—Bon Jovi | Safe |
| Rodrigo & Flávia | 26 (8, 9, 9) | Rumba | "When I Was Your Man"—Bruno Mars | Safe |
| Joanna & Bruno | 27 (9, 9, 9) | Samba | "Swing da Cor"—Daniela Mercury | Safe |

=== Week 7: Team Dances ===
The couples performed one unlearned dance and a team dance-off for extra points.

Running order

| Couple | Scores | Dance | Music | Result |
|---|---|---|---|---|
| Marina & Jefferson | 21 (7, 7, 7) | Forró | "K.O."—Pabllo Vittar | Risk zone |
| Joanna & Bruno | 22 (8, 7, 7) | Jive | "Great Balls of Fire"—Jerry Lee Lewis | Risk zone |
| Douglas & Sarah | 21 (7, 7, 7) | Foxtrot | "Beyond the Sea"—Robbie Williams | Eliminated |
| Geovanna & Teo | 29 (9, 10, 10) | Tango | "Castle on the Hill"—Ed Sheeran | Safe |
| Hylka & Fernando | 26 (9, 8, 9) | Quickstep | "What a Wonderful World"—Joey Ramone | Safe |
| Rodrigo & Flávia | 27 (9, 9, 9) | Cha-cha-cha | "Smooth"—Santana featuring Rob Thomas | Safe |
| Bárbara & Marquinhos | 25 (9, 8, 8) | Waltz | "You Raise Me Up"—Josh Groban | Safe |
| Raíssa & Paulo Victor | 27 (9, 9, 9) | Quickstep | "Valerie"—Mark Ronson featuring Amy Winehouse | Safe |
| Dudu & Dani | 27 (9, 9, 9) | Rumba | "Bleeding Love"—Leona Lewis | Safe |
| Isabel & Caio | 25 (9, 8, 8) | Pasodoble | "Human"—Rag'n'Bone Man | Risk zone |

The ten couples were divided in two teams of five based on the couple's place at the previous week's leaderboard. The red team (the top group) and the white team (the bottom group) participated in a dance-off with the winners receiving three points to be added to their total scores.

Team Dance-off
| Couple | Judges' votes | Dance | Music | Result |
|---|---|---|---|---|
| Joanna & Bruno; Geovanna & Teo; Hylka & Fernando; Rodrigo & Flávia; Bárbara & Marquinhos | White, Red, Red | Freestyle (Red Team) | "Pense e Dance"—Barão Vermelho | Winner (3 pts) |
| Marina & Jefferson; Douglas & Sarah; Raíssa & Paulo Victor; Dudu & Dani; Isabel & Caio | White, Red, Red | Freestyle (White Team) | "Ska"—Os Paralamas do Sucesso | Loser |

=== Week 8: Women's Night ===
The couples performed one unlearned dance dedicated to a meaningful woman in their life in order to celebrate the International Women's Day on March 8, 2018.

Running order

| Couple | Scores | Dance | Music | Result |
|---|---|---|---|---|
| Bárbara & Marquinhos | 26 (9, 9, 8) | Pasodoble | "Bad Romance"—Lady Gaga | Safe |
| Raíssa & Paulo Victor | 30 (10, 10, 10) | Samba | "Se Acaso Você Chegasse"—Elza Soares | Safe |
| Rodrigo & Flávia | 21 (7, 7, 7) | Quickstep | "Rolling in the Deep"—Adele | Risk zone |
| Dudu & Dani | 23 (7, 8, 8) | Foxtrot | "Blue Moon"—Billie Holiday | Safe |
| Hylka & Fernando | 28 (9, 9, 10) | Cha-cha-cha | "I Wish I Knew How It Would Feel to Be Free"—Nina Simone | Safe |
| Marina & Jefferson | 27 (9, 9, 9) | Pasodoble | "I Kissed a Girl"—Katy Perry | Safe |
| Geovanna & Teo | 27 (9, 9, 9) | Samba | "Whenever, Wherever"—Shakira | Safe |
| Isabel & Caio | 21 (7, 7, 7) | Quickstep | "The Shoop Shoop Song (It's in His Kiss)"—Cher | Eliminated |
| Joanna & Bruno | 21 (7, 7, 7) | Zouk | "Irreplaceable"—Beyoncé | Risk zone |

=== Week 9: TV Series Night ===
The couples performed one unlearned dance to famous TV series theme songs.

Running order

| Couple | Scores | Dance | Music | TV series | Result |
|---|---|---|---|---|---|
| Hylka & Fernando | 24 (8, 8, 8) | Jive | "I'll Be There for You"—The Rembrandts | Friends | Eliminated |
| Dudu & Dani | 24 (8, 8, 8) | Waltz | "Hallelujah"—Jeff Buckley | The O.C. | Risk zone |
| Raissa & Paulo Victor | 21 (7, 7, 7) | Cha-cha-cha | "Bad Girls"—Donna Summer | Sex and the City | Risk zone |
| Joanna & Bruno | 25 (8, 8, 9) | Rumba | "Chasing Cars"—Sara Ramirez | Grey's Anatomy | Safe |
| Geovanna & Teo | 30 (10, 10, 10) | Quickstep | "Theme from Hawaii Five-O"—Morton Stevens | Hawaii Five-O | Safe |
| Marina & Jefferson | 27 (9, 9, 9) | Foxtrot | "Superman (It's Not Easy)"—Five for Fighting | Smallville | Safe |
| Rodrigo & Flávia | 25 (9, 8, 8) | Pasodoble | "Theme from S.W.A.T."—Rhythm Heritage | S.W.A.T. | Safe |
| Bárbara & Marquinhos | 29 (9, 10, 10) | Quickstep | "Jeannie"—Hugo Montenegro & Buddy Kaye | I Dream of Jeannie | Safe |

=== Week 10: Jive Marathon ===
Running order

| Couple | Scores | Dance | Music | Result |
|---|---|---|---|---|
| Dudu & Dani | 27 (9, 9, 9) | Salsa | "New Rules"—Dua Lipa | Safe |
| Joana & Bruno | 24 (8, 8, 8) | Quickstep | "Suddenly I See"—KT Tunstall | Bottom three |
| Marina & Jefferson | 22 (7, 7, 8) | Zouk | "Sorry"—Justin Bieber | Bottom three |
| Raíssa & Paulo Victor | 25 (7, 9, 9) | Forró | "Caldo de Cana"—Nação Zumbi | Safe |
| Bárbara & Marquinhos | 30 (10, 10, 10) | Rumba | "Glory Box"—Portishead | Safe |
| Rodrigo & Flávia | 27 (9, 9, 9) | Foxtrot | "Grace Kelly"—Mika | Safe |
| Geovanna & Teo | 24 (8, 8, 8) | Pasodoble | "Psycho Killer"—Talking Heads | Bottom three |

After the individual routines were performed, the bottom three couples (Geovanna & Teo, Joana & Bruno and Marina & Jefferson) competed in a marathon-style instant jive, where Geovanna & Teo received immunity and avoided elimination this week, while the remaining couples were placed in the Risk Zone. Joana & Bruno received the fewest votes to save and were eliminated over Marina & Jefferson.

Jive Marathon
| Couple | Judges' choice | Dance | Music | Result |
|---|---|---|---|---|
| Geovanna & Teo | Geovanna & Teo | Instant Jive | "I'm Still Standing"—Elton John | Safe (Immunity) |
| Joana & Bruno | Geovanna & Teo | Instant Jive | "I'm Still Standing"—Elton John | Eliminated |
| Marina & Jefferson | Geovanna & Teo | Instant Jive | "I'm Still Standing"—Elton John | Risk zone |

=== Week 11: Latin Music Night ===
Individual judges' scores in the chart below (given in parentheses) are listed in this order from left to right: Jaime Arôxa, Sidney Magal, Fernanda Chamma, Paulo Goulart Filho.

The couples performed one unlearned trio dance involving an eliminated pro to famous latin songs.

Running order

| Couple (Trio Dance Partner) | Scores | Dance | Music | Result |
|---|---|---|---|---|
| Rodrigo & Flávia (Bruna Bays) | 31 (8, 7, 8, 8) | Salsa | "Baila Me"—Gipsy Kings | Risk zone |
| Marina & Jefferson (Fernando Perrotti) | 38 (10, 9, 10, 9) | Rumba | "Havana"—Camila Cabello | Safe |
| Geovanna & Teo (Carol Dias) | 40 (10, 10, 10, 10) | Zouk | "Despacito"—Luis Fonsi featuring Daddy Yankee | Safe |
| Raíssa & Paulo Victor (Tutu Morasi) | 33 (8, 8, 8, 9) | Waltz | "Valsinha (Valsecito)"—Chico Buarque | Risk zone |
| Bárbara & Marquinhos (Caio Vini) | 35 (9, 9, 9, 8) | Jive | "La Bamba"—Los Lobos | Safe |
| Dudu & Dani (Bella Fernandes) | 32 (8, 7, 8, 9) | Zouk | "Gypsy"—Shakira | Eliminated |

=== Week 12: Semifinals ===
The couples performed their final unlearned dance and a redemption dance chosen by the judges.

Running order

| Couple | Scores | Dance | Music | Result |
|---|---|---|---|---|
| Raíssa & Paulo Victor | 27 (9, 9, 9) | Salsa | "Waka Waka (This Time for Africa)"—Shakira | Risk zone |
| Raíssa & Paulo Victor | 26 (8, 9, 9) | Rumba | "Stay with Me"—Sam Smith | Risk zone |
| Marina & Jefferson | 21 (7, 7, 7) | Quickstep | "Are You Gonna Be My Girl"—Jet | Eliminated |
| Marina & Jefferson | 25 (9, 8, 8) | Samba | "Essa Mina É Louca"—Anitta | Eliminated |
| Geovanna & Teo | 26 (9, 8, 9) | Rumba | "Angels"—Robbie Williams | Safe |
| Geovanna & Teo | 30 (10, 10, 10) | Pasodoble | "The Final Countdown"—Europe | Safe |
| Bárbara & Marquinhos | 25 (8, 9, 8) | Salsa | "On the Floor"—Jennifer Lopez featuring Pitbull | Risk zone |
| Bárbara & Marquinhos | 24 (8, 8, 8) | Tango | "Toxic"—Britney Spears | Risk zone |
| Rodrigo & Flávia | 23 (8, 7, 8) | Zouk | "I Feel It Coming"—The Weeknd featuring Daft Punk | Eliminated |
| Rodrigo & Flávia | 26 (8, 9, 9) | Samba | "Sai da Minha Aba"—Só Pra Contrariar | Eliminated |

=== Week 13: Finals ===
The couples performed a new routine of their favorite dance style, a solo dance and a showdance.

Running order

| Couple | Scores | Dance | Music | Result |
|---|---|---|---|---|
| Bárbara & Marquinhos | 30 (10, 10, 10) | Samba | "Batendo a Porta"—João Nogueira | Third place |
| Bárbara & Marquinhos | 29 (10, 10, 9) | Solo | "Bridge over Troubled Water"—Simon & Garfunkel | Third place |
| Bárbara & Marquinhos | 30 (10, 10, 10) | Showdance | "Runnin' (Lose It All)"—Naughty Boy featuring Beyoncé & Arrow Benjamin | Third place |
| Geovanna & Teo | 30 (10, 10, 10) | Waltz | "Perfect"—Ed Sheeran | Winner |
| Geovanna & Teo | 27 (9, 9, 9) | Solo | "Without You"—Avicii featuring Sandro Cavazza | Winner |
| Geovanna & Teo | 30 (10, 10, 10) | Showdance | "Love Me Again"—John Newman | Winner |
| Raíssa & Paulo Victor | 30 (10, 10, 10) | Tango | "Believer"—Imagine Dragons | Runner-up |
| Raíssa & Paulo Victor | 26 (8, 9, 9) | Solo | "You Are Not Alone"—Michael Jackson | Runner-up |
| Raíssa & Paulo Victor | 28 (9, 10, 9) | Showdance | "I've Got the Music in Me"—The Kiki Dee Band | Runner-up |

== Dance chart ==
- Week 1: One unlearned dance (First Dances)
- Week 2: One unlearned dance (Movie Night)
- Week 3: One unlearned dance (80s Night)
- Week 4: One unlearned dance (Masquerade Ball)
- Week 5: One unlearned dance (Life Moments)
- Week 6: One unlearned dance (Free Theme)
- Week 7: One unlearned dance and team dances (Team Dances)
- Week 8: One unlearned dance (Women's Night)
- Week 9: One unlearned dance (TV Series Night)
- Week 10: One unlearned dance (Jive Marathon)
- Week 11: One unlearned dance (Latin Music Night)
- Week 12: One unlearned dance and redemption dance (Semifinals)
- Week 13: Favorite dance style, solo dance and showdance (Finals)

| Couple | 1 | 2 | 3 | 4 | 5 | 6 | 7 | | 8 | 9 | 10 | 11 | 12 | | 13 | | |
|---|---|---|---|---|---|---|---|---|---|---|---|---|---|---|---|---|---|
| Geovanna & Teo | Foxtrot | Cha-Cha-Cha | Forró | Waltz | Jive | Salsa | Tango | Freestyle (Red Team) | Samba | Quickstep | Paso Doble | Zouk (with Carol Dias) | Rumba | Paso Doble | Waltz | Solo | Showdance |
| Raissa & Paulo Victor | Rumba | Tango | Paso Doble | Jive | Zouk | Foxtrot | Quickstep | Freestyle (White Team) | Samba | Cha-Cha-Cha | Forró | Waltz (with Tutu Morasi) | Salsa | Rumba | Tango | Solo | ShowDance |
| Bárbara & Marquinhos | Samba | Cha-Cha-Cha | Tango | Foxtrot | Forró | Contemporary | Waltz | Freestyle (Red Team) | Paso Doble | Quickstep | Rumba | Jive (with Caio Vini) | Salsa | Tango | Samba | Solo | Showdance |
| Rodrigo & Flavia | Forró | Jive | Samba | Waltz | Tango | Rumba | Cha-Cha-Cha | Freestyle (Red Team) | Quickstep | Paso Doble | Foxtrot | Salsa (with Bruna Bays) | Zouk | Samba | | | |
| Marina & Jefferson | Cha-Cha-Cha | Waltz | Salsa | Samba | Tango | Jive | Forró | Freestyle (White Team) | Paso Doble | Foxtrot | Zouk | Rumba (with Fernando Perrotti) | Quickstep | Samba | | | |
| Dudu & Dani | Paso Doble | Forró | Jive | Quickstep | Samba | Tango | Rumba | Freestyle (White Team) | Foxtrot | Waltz | Salsa | Zouk (with Bella Fernandes) | | | | | |
| Joanna & Bruno | Foxtrot | Paso Doble | Tango | Cha-Cha-Cha | Waltz | Samba | jive | Freestyle (Red Team) | Zouk | Rumba | Quickstep | | | | | | |
| Hylka & Fernando | Tango | Foxtrot | Zouk | Samba | Rumba | Paso Doble | Quickstep | Freestyle (Red Team) | Cha-Cha-Cha | Jive | | | | | | | |
| Isabel & Caio | Samba | Rumba | Cha-Cha-Cha | Foxtrot | Forró | Waltz | Paso Doble | Freestyle (White Team) | Quickstep | | | | | | | | |
| Douglas & Sarah | Jive | Samba | Cha-Cha-Cha | Tango | Paso Doble | Zouk | Foxtrot | Freestyle (White Team) | | | | | | | | | |
| Diogo & Bella | Salsa | Paso Doble | Waltz | Cha-Cha-Cha | Zouk | Tango | | | | | | | | | | | |
| Sebá & Bruna | Salsa | Rumba | Jive | Waltz | Samba | | | | | | | | | | | | |
| Bárbara & Tutu | Cha-Cha-Cha | Tango | Quickstep | Rumba | | | | | | | | | | | | | |
| Popó & Alê | Salsa | Paso Doble | Cha-Cha-Cha | | | | | | | | | | | | | | |
| Bruno & Carol | Tango | Cha-Cha-Cha | | | | | | | | | | | | | | | |

Highest scoring dance
Lowest scoring dance

== Ratings and reception ==
=== Brazilian ratings ===
All numbers are in points and provided by Kantar Ibope Media.

| Episode | Title | Air date | Timeslot (BRT) | SP viewers (in points) | Source |
|---|---|---|---|---|---|
| 1 | Week 1 | January 17, 2018 | Wednesday 10:30 p.m. | 8.1 | |
| 2 | Week 2 | January 24, 2018 | Wednesday 10:30 p.m. | 7.4 | |
| 3 | Week 3 | January 31, 2018 | Wednesday 10:30 p.m. | 6.8 | |
| 4 | Week 4 | February 7, 2018 | Wednesday 10:30 p.m. | 6.5 | |
| 5 | Week 5 | February 14, 2018 | Wednesday 10:30 p.m. | 6.7 | |
| 6 | Week 6 | February 21, 2018 | Wednesday 10:30 p.m. | 6.2 | |
| 7 | Week 7 | February 28, 2018 | Wednesday 10:30 p.m. | 5.9 | |
| 8 | Week 8 | March 7, 2018 | Wednesday 10:30 p.m. | 5.8 | |
| 9 | Week 9 | March 14, 2018 | Wednesday 10:30 p.m. | 5.6 | |
| 10 | Week 10 | March 21, 2018 | Wednesday 10:30 p.m. | 5.5 | |
| 11 | Week 11 | March 28, 2018 | Wednesday 10:30 p.m. | 4.2 | |
| 12 | Week 12 | April 4, 2018 | Wednesday 10:30 p.m. | 5.9 | |
| 13 | Winner announced | April 11, 2018 | Wednesday 10:30 p.m. | 6.7 | |

- In 2018, each point represents 248.647 households in 15 market cities in Brazil (71.855 households in São Paulo).
