= Dancing Brasil =

- Genre: Reality competition
- Created by: BBC Worldwide
- Based on: Strictly Come Dancing
- Directed by: Marcelo Amiky; Rodrigo Carelli
- Presented by: Xuxa; Junno Andrade; Leandro Lima; Sérgio Marone
- Judges: Jaime Arôxa; Fernanda Chamma; Paulo Goulart Filho
- Opening theme: "I Wanna Dance with Somebody" by Thalita Pertuzatti
- Country of origin: Brazil
- Original language: Portuguese
- No. of seasons: 5
- No. of episodes: 58

Production
- Production location: Rio de Janeiro
- Camera setup: Multiple-camera
- Running time: 90 minutes
- Production companies: Endemol Shine; BBC Worldwide

Original release
- Network: RecordTV
- Release: 3 April 2017 – 11 September 2019

Related
- Xuxa Meneghel (2015–2016); The Four Brasil (2019–2020); Dancing Brasil Júnior; Strictly Come Dancing

Dancing Brasil is a Brazilian reality television series based on the British reality TV competition Strictly Come Dancing and is part of the Dancing with the Stars franchise. The series was produced by Endemol Shine in partnership with BBC Worldwide.

The show is hosted by Xuxa Meneghel, alongside Junno Andrade, who became co-host in season four. Sérgio Marone co-hosted the first two seasons, while Leandro Lima was co-host in the third season.

The series premiered on Monday, 3 April 2017 at 10:30 p.m. (BRT / AMT) on RecordTV.

== Format ==
The format of the show consists of a celebrity paired with a professional dancer. Each couple performs predetermined dances and competes against the others for judges' points. The three couples receiving the lowest total of judges' points are up to the public vote, where the couple who received the fewest votes will be eliminated each week until only the champion dance pair remains.

== Controversy ==
In order to produce Dancing Brasil, RecordTV bought the rights to adapt Dancing with the Stars, the American version of the British series Strictly Come Dancing, from BBC Worldwide, to be co-produced by Endemol Shine.

However, Strictly has been served as the base for Dança dos Famosos (The Famous' Dance), another Brazilian series which has been airing since 2005 on Rede Globo as a 1-hour segment on Domingão do Faustão, hosted by Fausto Silva. Globo bought the rights to adapt Strictly from Endemol Shine, known at time as Endemol Globo, a joint venture between Globo and Endemol.

The joint venture was dismantled in 2017, when Endemol Shine Group began controlled directly all the company's operations in Brazil, which allowed both the British and American adaptations to be sold separately.

== Series overview ==
Season	Number of		Duration dates	Placements		
Season	Couples	Weeks	Duration dates	Winner	Runner-up	Third place
1	14	13	3 April – 26 June 2017	Maytê Piragibe; Paulo Victor Souza	Jade Barbosa; Lucas Teodoro	Leo Miggiorin; Dani de Lova
2	12	10	24 July – 25 September 2017	Yudi Tamashiro; Bárbara Guerra	Suzana Alves; Tutu Morasi	Lexa; Lucas Teodoro
3	15	13	17 January – 11 April 2018	Geovanna Tominaga; Lucas Teodoro	Raissa Santana; Paulo Victor Souza	Bárbara Borges; Marquinhos Costa
4	14	11	26 September – 5 December 2018	Pérola Faria; Fernando Perrotti	Lu Andrade; Marquinhos Costa	Allan Souza Lima; Carol Dias
5	13	11	3 July – 11 September 2019	D'Black; Carol Dias	Dany Hypólito; Marquinhos Costa	Bia Feres; Paulo Victor Souza

== Ratings and reception ==
=== Brazilian ratings ===
All numbers are in points and provided by Kantar Ibope Media.

Season	Timeslot (BRT)	Premiered		Ended		TV season	SP viewers (in points)	Source
Season	Timeslot (BRT)	Date	Viewers (in points)	Date	Viewers (in points)	TV season	SP viewers (in points)	Source
1	Monday 10:30 pm	3 April 2017	5.0	26 June 2017	7.2	2017–18	5.9	
2	Monday 10:30 pm	24 July 2017	6.3	25 September 2017	7.8	2017–18	5.8	
3	Wednesday 10:30 pm	17 January 2018	8.1	11 April 2018	6.7	2017–18	6.2	
4	Wednesday 11:00 pm	26 September 2018	5.9	5 December 2018	7.0	2018–19	6.0	
5	Wednesday 10:45 pm	3 July 2019	6.7	11 September 2019	6.4	2019–20	5.3	

- Each point represents a specific number of households in 15 market cities in Brazil.

2017: 245.700 households (70.500 in São Paulo)
2018: 248.647 households (71.855 in São Paulo)

2019: 254.892 households (73.015 in São Paulo)
