= Dancing Brasil season 5 =

Dancing Brasil
- Season 5
- Celebrity winner: D'Black
- Professional winner: Carol Dias
- No. of episodes: 11

Release
- Original network: RecordTV
- Original release: July 3 – September 11, 2019

Season chronology
- ← Previous; Season 4

The fifth and final season of Dancing Brasil premiered on Wednesday, July 3, 2019, at 10:45 p.m. (BRT / AMT) on RecordTV.

On September 11, 2019, singer D'Black & Carol Dias won the competition with 38.21% of the public vote over olympic gymnast Dany Hypólito & Marquinhos Costa (32.23%) and artistic swimmer Bia Feres & Paulo Victor Souza (29.56%).

== Cast ==
=== Couples ===
Celebrity	Notability (known for)	Professional	Status
Maria Cecília	Singer	Lucas Teodoro	Eliminated 1st on July 10, 2019
Zeca Lima	Musician	Nick Molina	Eliminated 2nd on July 17, 2019
Thierry Figueira	Actor	Flávia Café	Eliminated 3rd on July 24, 2019
Maria Paula	Actress	Tutu Morasi	Eliminated 4th on July 30, 2019
Natália Guimarães	Actress	Rafa Scauri	Eliminated 5th on August 7, 2019
MC Koringa	Singer	Bella Fernandes	Withdrew on August 14, 2019
Alinne Prado	Journalist	Jefferson Andrade	Eliminated 6th on August 14, 2019
Cátia Paganote	Former paquita	Fernando Perrotti	Eliminated 7th on August 21, 2019
Ricardo Vianna	Actor	Dani de Lova	Eliminated 8th on August 28, 2019
Victor Sarro	Comedian	Bruna Bays	Eliminated 9th on September 4, 2019
Bia Feres	Artistic swimmer	Paulo Victor Souza	Third place on September 11, 2019
Dany Hypólito	Olympic gymnast	Marquinhos Costa	Runner-up on September 11, 2019
D'Black	Singer	Carol Dias	Winner on September 11, 2019

== Scoring chart ==
Couple	Place	1	2	1+2	3	4	5	6	7	8	9	10	11
D'Black & Carol	1	28.5	29.6	58.1	27.5	32.2	32.3	34.3	37.5	33.4+2=35.4	37.7	38.5+37.6=76.1	30+30=60
Dany & Marquinhos	2	25.5	28.3	53.8	27.5	38.0	36.1	33.9	39.2	31.8+0=31.8	36.6	35.7+38.8=74.5	30+30=60
Bia & Paulo Victor	3	28.9	31.7	60.6	30.8	38.0	39.3	33.8	38.0	35.6+0=35.6	35.0	36.7+37.6=74.3	30+30=60
Victor & Bruna	4	24.5	29.4	53.9	27.5	30.6	30.7	32.5	39.2	35.5+0=35.5	38.7	37.5+35.2=72.7	
Ricardo & Dani	5	27.3	32.8	60.1	26.7	34.3	30.6	31.6	35.4	34.3+0=34.3	36.6		
Cátia & Fernando	6	24.5	—	—	32.3	35.8	38.8	35.8	31.9	28.9+0=28.9			
Alinne & Jefferson	7	23.7	27.0	50.7	28.7	29.4	—	33.3	32.4				
MC Koringa & Bella	8	26.9	25.5	52.4	29.2	31.4	29.8	34.1	—				
Natália & Rafa	9	20.3	24.2	44.5	25.0	28.9	29.0	30.9					
Maria Paula & Tutu	10	24.8	30.7	55.5	27.5	—	28.6						
Thierry & Flávia	11	21.5	25.3	46.8	29.8	28.5							
Zeca & Nick	12	22.0	21.9	43.9	27.1								
Maria Cecília & Teo	13	19.8	24.0	43.8									

Key
Lowest score
Highest score
Eliminated
Risk zone
Immunity
Withdrew
Third place
Runner-up
Winner

== Weekly scores ==
Individual judges' scores in the charts below (given in parentheses) are listed in this order from left to right: Jaime Arôxa, Fernanda Chamma, Paulo Goulart Filho and Brazil

=== Week 1: First Dances ===
The couples performed pasodoble, cha-cha-cha, rumba, samba, tango, foxtrot, quickstep, salsa, rumba or waltz.

Running order

Couple	Scores	Dance	Music	Result
Maria Paula & Tutu	24.8 (6, 5, 6, 7.8)	Pasodoble	"Espumas ao Vento"—Flávio José	No elimination
MC Koringa & Bella	26.9 (6, 6, 7, 7.9)	Cha-cha-cha	"I've Got the Music in Me"—The Kiki Dee Band	No elimination
Natália & Rafa	20.3 (5, 4, 4, 7.3)	Rumba	"Something About the Way You Look Tonight"—Elton John	No elimination
D'Black & Carol	28.5 (7, 6, 7, 8.5)	Samba	"Aquele Abraço"—Gilberto Gil	No elimination
Cátia & Fernando	24.5 (6, 5, 6, 7.5)	Tango	"Pa'Bailar"—Bajofondo	No elimination
Zeca & Nick	22.0 (5, 5, 5, 7.0)	Foxtrot	"The Way You Look Tonight"—Fred Astaire	No elimination
Dany & Marquinhos	25.5 (5, 5, 7, 8.5)	Quickstep	"Show das Poderosas"—Anitta	No elimination
Ricardo & Dani	27.3 (7, 6, 6, 8.3)	Salsa	"La Cintura"—Alvaro Soler	No elimination
Alinne & Jefferson	23.7 (6, 5, 5, 7.7)	Samba	"Ain't Your Mama"—Jennifer Lopez	No elimination
Thierry & Flávia	21.5 (5, 5, 5, 6.5)	Salsa	"Corazón"—Maluma featuring Nego do Borel	No elimination
Maria Cecília & Teo	19.8 (4, 4, 5, 6.8)	Rumba	"Evidências"—Chitãozinho & Xororó	No elimination
Victor & Bruna	24.5 (6, 5, 6, 7.5)	Quickstep	"Why Can't We Be Friends?"—War	No elimination
Bia & Paulo Victor	28.9 (7, 6, 7, 8.9)	Waltz	"Dive"—Ed Sheeran	No elimination

=== Week 2: Life Moments ===
The couples performed one unlearned dance to celebrate the most memorable moment of their lives. Jive is introduced.

Since Cátia Paganote suffered an injury during week 2's rehearsals, she and Fernando were unable to perform on this week's live show. As result, the couple was given a bye for the week.

Running order

Couple	Scores	Dance	Music	Result
Victor & Bruna	29.4 (7, 7, 7, 8.4)	Salsa	"Carnavalera"—Havana Delirio	Safe
Natália & Rafa	24.2 (5, 6, 6, 7.2)	Jive	"Do You Love Me"—The Contours	Risk zone
MC Koringa & Bella	25.5 (6, 6, 6, 7.5)	Foxtrot	"The Pink Panther Theme"—Henry Mancini	Safe
Dany & Marquinhos	28.3 (6, 7, 7, 8.3)	Rumba	"Beauty and the Beast"—Celine Dion	Safe
Ricardo & Dani	32.8 (8, 8, 8, 8.8)	Pasodoble	"Filet'"—Benoît Jutras	Safe
Maria Cecília & Teo	24.0 (6, 5, 6, 7.0)	Foxtrot	"Man! I Feel Like a Woman!" —Shania Twain	Eliminated
Thierry & Flávia	25.3 (6, 6, 6, 7,3)	Tango	"California Dreamin'"—Sia	Safe
Bia & Paulo Victor	31.7 (7, 8, 8, 8.7)	Samba	"Circulou"—Banda Eva	Safe
Zeca & Nick	21.9 (5, 5, 5, 6.9)	Salsa	"Guantanamera"—Trini Lopez	Risk zone
Alinne & Jefferson	27.0 (7, 6, 6, 8.0)	Waltz	"Dona"—Roupa Nova	Safe
D'Black & Carol	29.6 (7, 7, 7, 8.6)	Pasodoble	"Ojos Así"—Shakira	Safe
Maria Paula & Tutu	30.7 (7, 8, 8, 7.7)	Foxtrot	"Cabaret"—Liza Minnelli	Safe

=== Week 3: 50s Night ===
Individual judges' scores in the charts below (given in parentheses) are listed in this order from left to right: Jaime Arôxa, Jarbas Homem de Mello, Paulo Goulart Filho and Brazil

The couples performed one unlearned dance to famous 50s songs.

Running order

Couple	Scores	Dance	Music	Result
Alinne & Jefferson	28.7 (7, 7, 7, 7.7)	Jive	"Good Golly, Miss Molly"—Little Richard	Safe
Victor & Bruna	27.5 (7, 6, 7, 7.5)	Foxtrot	"Volare"—Gipsy Kings	Safe
Maria Paula & Tutu	27.5 (6, 7, 7, 7.5)	Samba	"Maracangalha"—Dorival Caymmi	Safe
D'Black & Carol	27.5 (6, 7, 6, 8.5)	Waltz	"Oh Donna"—Ritchie Valens	Safe
Dany & Marquinhos	27.5 (6, 6, 7, 8.5)	Cha-cha-cha	"Day-O (The Banana Boat Song)"—Harry Belafonte	Safe
Zeca & Nick	27.1 (7, 7, 6, 7.1)	Rumba	"Love Me Tender"—Elvis Presley	Eliminated
Bia & Paulo Victor	30.8 (7, 8, 7, 8.8)	Jive	"Rock Around the Clock"—Bill Haley & His Comets	Safe
Thierry & Flávia	29.8 (7, 7, 8, 7.8)	Cha-cha-cha	"Cachito Mio"—Nat King Cole	Safe
Natália & Rafa	25.0 (5, 6, 6, 8.0)	Tango	"Carlos Gardel"—Nelson Gonçalves	Risk zone
Ricardo & Dani	26.7 (6, 6, 6, 8.7)	Waltz	"Since I Don't Have You"—The Skyliners	Risk zone
Cátia & Fernando	32.3 (8, 8, 8, 8.3)	Foxtrot	"I've Got You Under My Skin"—Frank Sinatra	Safe
MC Koringa & Bella	29.2 (7, 7, 7, 8.2)	Jive	"Hound Dog"—Elvis Presley	Safe

=== Week 4: Pan American Games ===
The couples performed one unlearned dance in order to promote the 2019 Pan American Games broadcast on RecordTV.

Since Maria Paula suffered an injury during week 4's rehearsals, she and Tutu were unable to perform on this week's live show. As result, the couple was given a bye for the week.

Running order

Couple	Scores	Dance	Music	Result
Dany & Marquinhos	38.0 (10, 10, 9, 9.0)	Tango	"Una Musica Brutal"—Gotan Project	Safe
Ricardo & Dani	34.3 (8, 9, 9, 8.3)	Samba	"La La La"—Shakira featuring Carlinhos Brown	Safe
D'Black & Carol	32.2 (8, 8, 8, 8.2)	Cha-cha-cha	"Kung Fu Fighting"—CeeLo Green	Safe
Bia & Paulo Victor	38 (9, 10, 10, 9.0)	Tango	"Quando, Quando, Quando"—Fergie featuring Will.i.am	Safe
Thierry & Flávia	28.5 (7, 7, 7, 7.5)	Pasodoble	"We Will Rock You"—Queen	Eliminated
Cátia & Fernando	35.8 (9, 9, 9, 8.8)	Waltz	"Love Me Like That"—Ella Mai	Safe
MC Koringa & Bella	31.4 (7, 8, 8, 8.4)	Quickstep	"Without Me"—Eminem	Safe
Natália & Rafa	28.9 (7, 7, 7, 7.9)	Cha-cha-cha	"Gloria"—Laura Branigan	Risk zone
Victor & Bruna	30.6 (8, 7, 7, 8.6)	Pasodoble	"Seven Nation Army"—The White Stripes	Safe
Alinne & Jefferson	29.4 (7, 7, 7, 8.4)	Tango	"Fighter"—Christina Aguilera	Risk zone

=== Week 5: Movie Night ===
The couples performed one unlearned dance to famous film songs.

Since Alinne Prado suffered an injury during week 5's rehearsals, she and Jefferson were unable to perform on this week's live show. As result, the couple was given a bye for the week.

Running order

Couple	Scores	Dance	Music	Film	Result
Victor & Bruna	30.7 (8, 7, 8, 7.7)	Cha-cha-cha	"The Power of Love"—Huey Lewis and the News	Back to the Future	Safe
Maria Paula & Tutu	28.6 (7, 7, 7, 7.6)	Rumba	"I'll Never Love Again"—Lady Gaga	A Star Is Born	Eliminated
Ricardo & Dani	30.6 (7, 8, 7, 8.6)	Tango	"Skyfall"—Adele	Skyfall	Safe
Natália & Rafa	29.0 (7, 7, 7, 8.0)	Waltz	"She"—Elvis Costello	Notting Hill	Risk zone
MC Koringa & Bella	29.8 (8, 7, 7, 7.8)	Rumba	"He Lives in You"—Michael Ball & Alfie Boe	The Lion King	Risk zone
Dany & Marquinhos	36.1 (9, 9, 9, 9.1)	Pasodoble	"Survivor"—2WEI	Tomb Raider	Safe
Cátia & Fernando	38.8 (10, 10, 10, 8.8)	Rumba	"All by Myself"—Jamie O'Neal	Bridget Jones's Diary	Safe
D'Black & Carol	32.3 (8, 8, 8, 8.3)	Tango	"Pray for Me"—The Weeknd & Kendrick Lamar	Black Panther	Safe
Bia & Paulo Victor	39.3 (10, 10, 10, 9.3)	Rumba	"Unchained Melody"—The Righteous Brothers	Ghost	Safe

=== Week 6: Father's Night ===
The couples performed one unlearned dance dedicated to their fathers in order to celebrate the Brazilian Father's Day on August 11, 2019.

Running order

Couple	Scores	Dance	Music	Result
Bia & Paulo Victor	33.8 (8, 9, 8, 8.8)	Quickstep	"Surfin' U.S.A."—The Beach Boys	Safe
D'Black & Carol	34.3 (9, 8, 9, 8.3)	Foxtrot	"You Are the Sunshine of My Life"—Stevie Wonder	Safe
Natália & Rafa	30.9 (7, 8, 8, 7.9)	Samba	"Rock do Rato"—Franco	Eliminated
MC Koringa & Bella	34.1 (9, 8, 9, 8.1)	Waltz	"Billie Jean"—Michael Jackson	Safe
Alinne & Jefferson	33.3 (9, 8, 8, 8.3)	Salsa	"Coisinha do Pai"—Martinho da Vila	Safe
Victor & Bruna	32.5 (8, 8, 8, 8.5)	Tango	"Bella Ciao"—Pablo Ramos & Los Herederos del Compás	Risk zone
Dany & Marquinhos	33.9 (8, 8, 8, 8.9)	Waltz	"Estrada da Vida"—Milionário & José Rico	Safe
Ricardo & Dani	31.6 (7, 8, 8, 8.6)	Foxtrot	"Trem-Bala"—Ana Vilela	Risk zone
Cátia & Fernando	35.8 (9, 9, 9, 8.8)	Jive	"In the Mood" —Glenn Miller	Safe

=== Week 7: Couple's Choice ===
The couples performed one unlearned dance of their choice. Contemporary, charleston, stiletto and hip-hop are introduced.

MC Koringa suffered an injury during week 7's rehearsals which he would be unable to recover in time for next week's live show. As a result, he and Bella had to withdraw from the competition.

Running order

Couple	Scores	Dance	Music	Result
Cátia & Fernando	31.9 (8, 8, 8, 7.9)	Contemporary	"More"—Usher	Risk zone
Dany & Marquinhos	39.2 (10, 10, 10, 9.2)	Charleston	"Hey Pachuco"—Royal Crown Revue	Safe
Ricardo & Dani	35.4 (9, 9, 9, 8.4)	Contemporary	"Dancing on My Own"—Calum Scott	Risk zone
Alinne & Jefferson	32.4 (8, 8, 8, 8.4)	European Samba	"O Canto da Cidade"—Daniela Mercury	Eliminated
Victor & Bruna	39.2 (10, 10, 10, 9.2)	Stiletto	"Crazy in Love"—Beyoncé	Safe
Bia & Paulo Victor	38.0 (9, 10, 10, 9.0)	Contemporary	"Legendary"—Welshly Arms	Safe
D'Black & Carol	37.5 (9, 10, 10, 8.5)	Hip-hop	"Get Up Offa That Thing"—James Brown	Safe

=== Week 8: The Musicals ===
The couples performed a group dance with a different partner for extra points.

Running order

Couple	Judges' choice	Dance	Music	Musical	Result
Bia & Marquinhos	D'Black & Bruna	Musical jazz	"Mambo!"	West Side Story	Loser
Cátia & Paulo Victor	D'Black & Bruna	Musical jazz	"Mambo!"	West Side Story	Loser
D'Black & Bruna	D'Black & Bruna	Musical jazz	"Mambo!"	West Side Story	Winner (2 pts)
Dany & Fernando	D'Black & Bruna	Musical jazz	"Mambo!"	West Side Story	Loser
Ricardo & Carol	D'Black & Bruna	Musical jazz	"Mambo!"	West Side Story	Loser
Victor & Dani	D'Black & Bruna	Musical jazz	"Mambo!"	West Side Story	Loser

The couples performed one unlearned musical theatre-inspired dance.

Running order

Couple	Scores	Dance	Music	Musical	Result
Victor & Bruna	35.5 (9, 9, 9, 8.5)	Jive	"The Nicest Kids in Town"	Hairspray	Safe
Bia & Paulo Victor	35.6 (9, 9, 9, 8.6)	Pasodoble	"Let the Sunshine In"	Hair	Safe
Ricardo & Dani	34.3 (9, 9, 8, 8.3)	Rumba	"Falling Slowly"	Once	Risk zone
Cátia & Fernando	28.9 (7, 7, 7, 7.9)	Samba	"Under the Sea"	The Little Mermaid	Eliminated
D'Black & Carol	35.4 (8, 9, 8, 8.4)	Rumba	"O Meu Amor"	Ópera do Malandro	Safe
Dany & Marquinhos	31.8 (8, 8, 7, 8.8)	Salsa	"There She Goes"	Fame	Risk zone

=== Week 9: Trio Night ===
The couples performed one unlearned trio dance involving an eliminated pro.

Running order

Couple (Trio Dance Partner)	Scores	Dance	Music	Result
Ricardo & Dani (Flávia Café)	36.6 (10, 9, 9, 8.6)	Jive	"The Girl's Gone Wild"—Travis Tritt	Bottom three
Bia & Paulo Victor (Rafa Scauri)	35.0 (8, 9, 9, 9.0)	Cha-cha-cha	"Timber"—Pitbull featuring Kesha	Bottom three
Victor & Bruna (Nick Molina)	38.7 (10, 10, 10, 8.7)	Rumba	"Someone You Loved"—Lewis Capaldi	Safe
Dany & Marquinhos (Lucas Teodoro)	36.6 (9, 10, 9, 8.6)	Jive	"Flip, Flop and Fly"—Big Joe Turner	Bottom three
D'Black & Carol (Bella Fernandes)	37.7 (9, 10, 10, 8.7)	Salsa	"Adrenalina"—Wisin featuring Ricky Martin and Jennifer Lopez	Safe

After the individual routines were performed, the bottom three couples (Bia & Paulo Victor, Dany & Marquinhos and Ricardo & Dani) competed in a tango dance-off, where Dany & Marquinhos received immunity and avoided elimination this week, while the remaining couples were placed in the Risk Zone. Ricardo & Dani received the fewest votes to save and were eliminated over Bia & Paulo Victor.

Tango dance-off
Couple	Judges' choice	Dance	Music	Result
Bia & Paulo Victor	Dany & Marquinhos	Tango	"New Rules"—Dua Lipa	Risk zone
Dany & Marquinhos	Dany & Marquinhos	Tango	"Rumour Has It"—Adele	Safe (Immunity)
Ricardo & Dani	Dany & Marquinhos	Tango	"Querer"—Cirque du Soleil	Eliminated

=== Week 10: Semifinals ===
The couples performed their final two unlearned dances (a Latin dance and a ballroom dance).

Running order

Couple	Scores	Dance	Music	Result
Victor & Bruna	37.5 (9, 10, 10, 8.5)	Samba	"Devagar, Devagarinho"—Martinho da Vila	Eliminated
Victor & Bruna	35.2 (9, 9, 9, 8.2)	Waltz	"Fall on Me"—Andrea Bocelli	Eliminated
Bia & Paulo Victor	36.7 (9, 10, 9, 8.7)	Salsa	"Conga"—Miami Sound Machine	Risk zone
Bia & Paulo Victor	37.6 (10, 9, 10, 8.6)	Foxtrot	"The Lady Is a Tramp"—Frank Sinatra	Risk zone
D'Black & Carol	38.5 (10, 10, 10, 8.5)	Jive	"Proud Mary"—Tina Turner	Safe
D'Black & Carol	37.6 (10, 10, 9, 8.6)	Quickstep	"Sing, Sing, Sing (With a Swing)"—Benny Goodman	Safe
Dany & Marquinhos	35.7 (9, 9, 9, 8.7)	Samba	"The Blues Walk"—Clifford Brown & Max Roach	Risk zone
Dany & Marquinhos	38.8 (10, 10, 10, 8.8)	Foxtrot	"I Want It That Way"—Backstreet Boys	Risk zone

=== Week 11: Finals ===
The couples performed a redemption dance and a showdance that fused three previously learned dance styles.

Running order

Couple	Scores	Dance	Music	Result
Bia & Paulo Victor	30 (10, 10, 10)	Waltz	"I Put a Spell on You"—Nina Simone	Third place
Bia & Paulo Victor	30 (10, 10, 10)	Showdance	"Are You Gonna Go My Way"—Lenny Kravitz	Third place
D'Black & Carol	30 (10, 10, 10)	Pasodoble	"Bad"—Michael Jackson	Winner
D'Black & Carol	30 (10, 10, 10)	Showdance	"Sax"—Fleur East	Winner
Dany & Marquinhos	30 (10, 10, 10)	Cha-cha-cha	"Dance Like Yo Daddy"—Meghan Trainor	Runner-up
Dany & Marquinhos	30 (10, 10, 10)	Showdance	"Admirável Chip Novo"—Pitty	Runner-up

== Dance chart ==
- Week 1: One unlearned dance (First Dances)
- Week 2: One unlearned dance (Life Moments)
- Week 3: One unlearned dance (50s Night)
- Week 4: One unlearned dance (Pan American Games)
- Week 5: One unlearned dance (Movie Night)
- Week 6: One unlearned dance (Father's Night)
- Week 7: One unlearned dance (Couple's Choice)
- Week 8: One unlearned dance (The Musicals)
- Week 9: One unlearned dance (Trio Night)
- Week 10: Two unlearned dances (Semifinals)
- Week 11: Redemption dance and showdance (Finals)

== Ratings and reception ==
=== Brazilian ratings ===
All numbers are in points and provided by Kantar Ibope Media.

Episode	Title	Air date	Timeslot (BRT)	SP viewers (in points)	Source
1	Week 1	July 3, 2019	Wednesday 10:45 p.m.	6.7	
2	Week 2	July 10, 2019	Wednesday 10:45 p.m.	5.7	
3	Week 3	July 17, 2019	Wednesday 10:45 p.m.	5.2	
4	Week 4	July 24, 2019	Wednesday 10:45 p.m.	4.9	
5	Week 5	July 30, 2019	Tuesday 10:45 p.m.	3.6	
6	Week 6	August 7, 2019	Wednesday 10:45 p.m.	4.9	
7	Week 7	August 14, 2019	Wednesday 10:45 p.m.	5.8	
8	Week 8	August 21, 2019	Wednesday 10:45 p.m.	4.5	
9	Week 9	August 28, 2019	Wednesday 10:45 p.m.	5.3	
10	Week 10	September 4, 2019	Wednesday 10:45 p.m.	4.8	
11	Winner announced	September 11, 2019	Wednesday 10:45 p.m.	6.4	

- In 2019, each point represents 254.892 households in 15 market cities in Brazil (73.015 households in São Paulo).
