= Dancing Brasil season 4 =

Dancing Brasil
- Season 4
- Celebrity winner: Pérola Faria
- Professional winner: Fernando Perrotti
- No. of episodes: 11

Release
- Original network: RecordTV
- Original release: September 26 – December 5, 2018

Season chronology
- ← Previous; Season 3 Next → Season 5

The fourth season of Dancing Brasil premiered on Wednesday, September 26, 2018 at 11:00 p.m. (BRT / AMT) on RecordTV.

On December 5, 2018, actress Pérola Faria & Fernando Perrotti won the competition with 50.22% of the public vote over singer Lu Andrade & Marquinhos Costa (21.22%), actor Allan Souza Lima & Carol Dias (15.76%) and former football player Amaral & Bruna Bays (12.81%). This was the first season to feature four finalists instead of three.

== Cast ==
=== Couples ===
| Celebrity | Notability (known for) | Professional | Status |
|---|---|---|---|
| Dadá Coelho | Comedian | Renato Zoia | Eliminated 1st on October 3, 2018 |
| Franciele Grossi | Model | Lucas Nunes | Eliminated 2nd on October 10, 2018 |
| Marcello Faustini | Singer | Thaiane Chuvas | Eliminated 3rd on October 17, 2018 |
| Nizo Neto | Actor | Luana Zeglin | Eliminated 4th on October 24, 2018 |
| Beto Marden | TV host | Bella Fernandes | Eliminated 5th on October 31, 2018 |
| Valéria Valenssa | Model | Jefferson Andrade | Eliminated 6th on November 7, 2018 |
| Oscar Filho | Comedian | Dani de Lova | Eliminated 7th on November 14, 2018 |
| Camila Rodrigues | Actress | Lucas Nunes; Djeiko Henes (week 1–6) | Eliminated 8th on November 21, 2018 |
| Juliana Rios | Journalist | Tutu Morasi | Eliminated 9th on November 28, 2018 |
| Bernardo Velasco | Actor | Bia Marques | Eliminated 10th on November 28, 2018 |
| Amaral | Former football player | Bruna Bays | Fourth place on December 5, 2018 |
| Allan Souza Lima | Actor | Carol Dias | Third place on December 5, 2018 |
| Lu Andrade | Singer | Marquinhos Costa | Runner-up on December 5, 2018 |
| Pérola Faria | Actress | Fernando Perrotti | Winner on December 5, 2018 |

== Scoring chart ==
| Couple | Place | 1 | 2 | 1+2 | 3 | 4 | 5 | 6 | 7 | 8 | 9 | 10 | | 11 |
| Couple | Place | 1 | 2 | 1+2 | 3 | 4 | 5 | 6 | 7 | 8 | 9 | 1 | 2 | 11 |
|---|---|---|---|---|---|---|---|---|---|---|---|---|---|---|
| Pérola & Fernando | 1 | 18 | 23 | 41 | 27 | 27 | 30 | 29 | 27 | 27+0=27 | 26 | 29 | 30 | 30+30=60 |
| Lu & Marquinhos | 2 | 15 | 18 | 33 | 22 | 22 | 24 | 23 | 27 | 24+0=24 | 25 | 26 | 30 | 30+28=58 |
| Allan & Carol | 3 | 19 | 18 | 37 | 21 | 23 | 23 | 30 | 27 | 29+3=32 | 27 | 28 | 27 | 30+30=60 |
| Amaral & Bruna | 4 | 17 | 21 | 38 | 24 | 25 | 22 | 25 | 25 | 27+3=30 | 23 | 24 | 24 | 27+28=55 |
| Bernardo & Bia | 5 | 17 | 16 | 33 | 21 | 22 | 25 | 24 | 24 | 27+3=30 | 27 | 24 | 24 | |
| Juliana & Tutu | 6 | 17 | 21 | 38 | 25 | 22 | 26 | 27 | 27 | 28+0=28 | 26 | 23 | | |
| Camila & Lucas | 7 | 16 | 18 | 34 | 19 | 24 | 23 | 21 | 21 | 22+0=22 | 24 | | | |
| Oscar & Dani | 8 | 17 | 22 | 39 | 23 | 27 | 22 | 24 | 27 | 23+3=26 | | | | |
| Valéria & Jefferson | 9 | 17 | 21 | 38 | 27 | 25 | 27 | 29 | 24 | | | | | |
| Beto & Bella | 10 | 21 | 21 | 42 | 23 | 23 | 24 | 24 | | | | | | |
| Nizo & Luana | 11 | 12 | 18 | 30 | 18 | 21 | 21 | | | | | | | |
| Marcello & Thaiane | 12 | 15 | 16 | 31 | 18 | 21 | | | | | | | | |
| Franciele & Lucas | 13 | 13 | 17 | 30 | 18 | | | | | | | | | |
| Dadá & Renato | 14 | 10 | 14 | 24 | | | | | | | | | | |

Key
Lowest score
Highest score
Eliminated
Risk zone
Immunity
Fourth place
Third place
Runner-up
Winner

== Weekly scores ==
Individual judges' scores in the charts below (given in parentheses) are listed in this order from left to right: Jaime Arôxa, Fernanda Chamma, Paulo Goulart Filho.

=== Week 1: First Dances ===
The couples performed pasodoble, jive, quickstep, foxtrot, rumba, tango, zouk, cha-cha-cha or samba.

Running order

| Couple | Scores | Dance | Music | Result |
|---|---|---|---|---|
| Lu & Marquinhos | 15 (5, 5, 5) | Pasodoble | "Blame"—Calvin Harris featuring John Newman | No elimination |
| Oscar & Dani | 17 (6, 5, 6) | Jive | "Feel It Still"—Portugal. The Man | No elimination |
| Valéria & Jefferson | 17 (5, 6, 6) | Quickstep | "Moonlight"—Grace VanderWaal | No elimination |
| Nizo & Luana | 12 (4, 4, 4) | Foxtrot | "Ain't No Mountain High Enough"—Diana Ross | No elimination |
| Pérola & Fernando | 18 (6, 6, 6) | Rumba | "Never Enough"—Loren Allred | No elimination |
| Allan & Carol | 19 (7, 6, 6) | Tango | "Pompeii"—Bastille | No elimination |
| Dadá & Renato | 10 (4, 3, 3) | Zouk | "Sua Cara"—Major Lazer featuring Anitta & Pabllo Vittar | No elimination |
| Amaral & Bruna | 17 (7, 5, 5) | Pasodoble | "Everybody Wants to Rule the World"—Tears for Fears | No elimination |
| Juliana & Tutu | 17 (6, 5, 6) | Cha-cha-cha | "Don't Go Breaking My Heart"—Elton John | No elimination |
| Beto & Bella | 21 (7, 7, 7) | Jive | "River Deep - Mountain High"—Tina Turner | No elimination |
| Camila & Djeiko | 16 (5, 5, 6) | Foxtrot | "La Vie en rose"—Édith Piaf | No elimination |
| Marcello & Thaiane | 15 (5, 4, 6) | Tango | "Mi Confesión"—Gotan Project | No elimination |
| Franciele & Lucas | 13 (4, 4, 5) | Cha-cha-cha | "Don't Worry"—Madcon featuring Ray Dalton | No elimination |
| Bernardo & Bia | 17 (5, 6, 6) | Samba | "Nem Vem Que Não Tem"—Wilson Simonal | No elimination |

=== Week 2: Life Moments ===
The couples performed one unlearned dance to celebrate the most memorable moment of their lives. Waltz is introduced.

Running order

| Couple | Scores | Dance | Music | Result |
|---|---|---|---|---|
| Allan & Carol | 18 (6, 6, 6) | Rumba | "La Belle du Jour"—Alceu Valença | Safe |
| Juliana & Tutu | 21 (7, 7, 7) | Pasodoble | "Numb"—Usher | Safe |
| Amaral & Bruna | 21 (7, 7, 7) | Samba | "Samba Rock"—Seu Jorge | Safe |
| Lu & Marquinhos | 18 (6, 6, 6) | Waltz | "Crazy"—Aerosmith | Safe |
| Bernardo & Bia | 16 (6, 5, 5) | Foxtrot | "You Only Live Once"—The Strokes | Safe |
| Camila & Djeiko | 18 (6, 6, 6) | Jive | "Coisa Linda"—Tiago Iorc | Safe |
| Nizo & Luana | 18 (6, 6, 6) | Rumba | "Try It on My Own"—Whitney Houston | Risk zone |
| Dadá & Renato | 14 (5, 4, 5) | Samba | "Alguém Me Avisou"—Dona Ivone Lara | Eliminated |
| Oscar & Dani | 22 (7, 7, 8) | Cha-cha-cha | "Shoot to Thrill" —AC/DC | Safe |
| Pérola & Fernando | 23 (8, 8, 7) | Waltz | "Tocando Em Frente"—Almir Sater | Safe |
| Marcello & Thaiane | 16 (5, 5, 6) | Jive | "Burning Love"—Elvis Presley | Risk zone |
| Franciele & Lucas | 17 (6, 5, 6) | Tango | "Telegrama"—Zeca Baleiro | Risk zone |
| Beto & Bella | 21 (6, 8, 7) | Waltz | "Cantiga do Acordar"—Chico Buarque & Edu Lobo | Safe |
| Valéria & Jefferson | 21 (7, 7, 7) | Jive | "Não Quero Dinheiro"—Tim Maia | Safe |

=== Week 3: When I Grow Up ===
The couples performed one unlearned dance to showcase what they aimed to be when they grow up.

Running order

| Couple | Scores | Dance | Music | Result |
|---|---|---|---|---|
| Beto & Bella | 23 (7, 8, 8) | Quickstep | "Charleston"—Sam Levine | Safe |
| Valéria & Jefferson | 27 (9, 9, 9) | Cha-cha-cha | "Freak Le Boom / Conga La Conga"—Gretchen | Safe |
| Bernardo & Bia | 21 (7, 7, 7) | Jive | "Jack is Back"—The Clan | Safe |
| Juliana & Tutu | 25 (8, 9, 8) | Zouk | "Angels—The xx | Safe |
| Nizo & Luana | 18 (6, 6, 6) | Quickstep | "William Tell Overture"—Anton Hughes | Risk zone |
| Camila & Djeiko | 19 (6, 6, 7) | Waltz | "When We Were Young"—Adele | Safe |
| Allan & Carol | 21 (7, 7, 7) | Foxtrot | "Fly Me to the Moon"—Frank Sinatra | Safe |
| Lu & Marquinhos | 22 (8, 7, 7) | Cha-cha-cha | "Let's Get Loud"—Jennifer Lopez | Safe |
| Oscar & Dani | 23 (7, 8, 8) | Samba | "Samba do Approach"—Zeca Baleiro | Safe |
| Franciele & Lucas | 18 (6, 6, 6) | Jive | "Shake the Room"—Gamu | Eliminated |
| Amaral & Bruna | 24 (8, 8, 8) | Waltz | "Rise Up"—Andra Day | Safe |
| Pérola & Fernando | 27 (9, 9, 9) | Quickstep | "Can't Touch It"—Ricki-Lee | Safe |
| Marcello & Thaiane | 18 (6, 6, 6) | Rumba | "Photograph"—Ed Sheeran | Risk zone |

=== Week 4: Movie Night ===
The couples performed one unlearned dance to famous film songs.

Running order

| Couple | Scores | Dance | Music | Film | Result |
|---|---|---|---|---|---|
| Allan & Carol | 23 (7, 8, 8) | Cha-cha-cha | "Twist and Shout"—The Beatles | Ferris Bueller's Day Off | Safe |
| Camila & Djeiko | 24 (8, 8, 8) | Tango | "Crazy in Love"—Beyoncé | Fifty Shades of Grey | Safe |
| Oscar & Dani | 27 (9, 9, 9) | Quickstep | "Soul Bossa Nova"—Quincy Jones | Austin Powers | Safe |
| Valéria & Jefferson | 25 (9, 8, 8) | Rumba | "Listen"—Beyoncé | Dreamgirls | Safe |
| Beto & Bella | 23 (7, 8, 8) | Pasodoble | "Hora Zero"—Rodrigo y Gabriela | Edward Scissorhands | Safe |
| Lu & Marquinhos | 22 (8, 7, 7) | Tango | "Lady Marmalade"—Christina Aguilera, Lil' Kim, Mýa, Pink | Moulin Rouge! | Risk zone |
| Amaral & Bruna | 25 (8, 9, 8) | Cha-cha-cha | "Boogie Wonderland"—Earth, Wind and Fire | The Intouchables | Safe |
| Juliana & Tutu | 22 (7, 8, 7) | Jive | "Nowhere Fast"—Fire Inc. | Streets of Fire | Risk zone |
| Bernardo & Bia | 22 (8, 7, 7) | Quickstep | "Spider-Man"—The Ramones | Spider-Man | Risk zone |
| Pérola & Fernando | 27 (9, 9, 9) | Tango | "Você Não Me Ensinou a Te Esquecer"—Caetano Veloso | Lisbela e o Prisioneiro | Safe |
| Marcello & Thaiane | 21 (7, 7, 7) | Waltz | "Over the Rainbow"—Judy Garland | The Wizard of Oz | Eliminated |
| Nizo & Luana | 21 (7, 7, 7) | Tango | "Born to Be Wild"—Steppenwolf | Easy Rider | Risk zone |

=== Week 5: Brazil Night ===
The couples performed one unlearned dance to classic or popular Brazilian songs.

Running order

| Couple | Scores | Dance | Music | Result |
|---|---|---|---|---|
| Amaral & Bruna | 22 (7, 8, 7) | Tango | "Amor I Love You"—Marisa Monte | Risk zone |
| Lu & Marquinhos | 24 (8, 8, 8) | Samba | "O Que É Que A Baiana Tem?"—Carmen Miranda | Safe |
| Oscar & Dani | 22 (7, 8, 7) | Foxtrot | "Epitáfio"—Titãs | Risk zone |
| Pérola & Fernando | 30 (10, 10, 10) | Samba | "Menina Dança"—Novos Baianos | Safe |
| Nizo & Luana | 21 (7, 7, 7) | Zouk | "Medo Bobo"—Maiara & Maraisa | Eliminated |
| Juliana & Tutu | 26 (8, 9, 9) | Waltz | "Fascinação"—Nana Caymmi | Safe |
| Bernardo & Bia | 25 (8, 9, 8) | Tango | "Desabafo"—Roberto Carlos | Safe |
| Camila & Djeiko | 23 (7, 8, 8) | Zouk | "Cheguei Pra Te Amar"—Ivete Sangalo featuring MC Livinho | Safe |
| Allan & Carol | 23 (7, 8, 8) | Quickstep | "Meu Erro"—Paralamas do Sucesso | Safe |
| Valéria & Jefferson | 27 (9, 9, 9) | Tango | "Capitu"—Zélia Duncan | Safe |
| Beto & Bella | 24 (8, 8, 8) | Cha-cha-cha | "Você Não Soube Me Amar"—Blitz | Safe |

=== Week 6: Michael Jackson Night ===
The couples performed one unlearned dance to classic songs by Michael Jackson.

Running order

| Couple | Scores | Dance | Music | Result |
|---|---|---|---|---|
| Bernardo & Bia | 24 (8, 8, 8) | Cha-cha-cha | "The Way You Make Me Feel" | Risk zone |
| Camila & Djeiko | 21 (7, 7, 7) | Rumba | "I Just Can't Stop Loving You" | Risk zone |
| Beto & Bella | 24 (8, 8, 8) | Foxtrot | "Black or White" | Eliminated |
| Valéria & Jefferson | 29 (9, 10, 10) | Samba | "I Want You Back" | Safe |
| Amaral & Bruna | 25 (8, 8, 9) | Rumba | "You Are Not Alone" | Safe |
| Juliana & Tutu | 27 (9, 9, 9) | Tango | "Scream/Childhood" | Safe |
| Allan & Carol | 30 (10, 10, 10) | Pasodoble | "Smooth Criminal" | Safe |
| Lu & Marquinhos | 23 (7, 8, 8) | Zouk | "Human Nature" | Risk zone |
| Oscar & Dani | 24 (8, 8, 8) | Rumba | "Man in the Mirror" | Risk zone |
| Pérola & Fernando | 29 (9, 10, 10) | Cha-cha-cha | "Love Never Felt So Good" | Safe |

=== Week 7: Free Theme ===
The couples performed one unlearned dance.

Djeiko Henes was unable to perform on this week's live show, so Camila Rodrigues danced with eliminated pro Lucas Nunes instead.

Running order

| Couple | Scores | Dance | Music | Result |
|---|---|---|---|---|
| Oscar & Dani | 27 (9, 9, 9) | Waltz | "You Don't Own Me—Grace featuring G-Eazy | Safe |
| Juliana & Tutu | 27 (9, 9, 9) | Samba | "Jackson do Pandeiro"—Chiclete com Banana | Safe |
| Bernardo & Bia | 24 (8, 8, 8) | Rumba | "Always"—Gavin James | Risk zone |
| Valéria & Jefferson | 24 (8, 8, 8) | Foxtrot | "Happy Together"—The Turtles | Eliminated |
| Amaral & Bruna | 25 (8, 9, 8) | Jive | "369"—Cupid featuring B.o.B | Safe |
| Pérola & Fernando | 27 (9, 9, 9) | Pasodoble | "The House of the Rising Sun"—Santa Esmeralda | Safe |
| Camila & Lucas | 21 (7, 7, 7) | Cha-cha-cha | "Wannabe"—Spice Girls | Risk zone |
| Allan & Carol | 27 (9, 9, 9) | Zouk | "Hello"—Vanda May | Safe |
| Lu & Marquinhos | 27 (9, 9, 9) | Quickstep | "Little Talks"—Of Monsters and Men | Safe |

=== Week 8: Team Dances ===
The couples performed one unlearned dance and a team dance-off for extra points. Contemporary, jazz, hip-hop and salsa are introduced.

Djeiko Henes had to withdraw from the competition, so Lucas Nunes replaced him as Camila Rodrigues' partner for the rest of the season.

Running order

| Couple | Scores | Dance | Music | Result |
|---|---|---|---|---|
| Juliana & Tutu | 28 (9, 10, 9) | Contemporary | "Big God"—Florence and the Machine | Safe |
| Amaral & Bruna | 27 (9, 9, 9) | Jazz | "Bring On The Men"—Linda Eder | Safe |
| Lu & Marquinhos | 24 (8, 8, 8) | Hip-hop | "Space Jam"—Quad City DJ's | Risk zone |
| Allan & Carol | 29 (9, 10, 10) | Contemporary | "Unsteady"—X Ambassadors | Safe |
| Camila & Lucas | 22 (7, 7, 8) | Contemporary | "Why Don't You Love Me"—Beyoncé | Risk zone |
| Bernardo & Bia | 27 (9, 9, 9) | Jazz | "If I Ain't Got You"—Alicia Keys | Safe |
| Pérola & Fernando | 27 (9, 9, 9) | Salsa | "Oye! (Pablo Flores Spanish Remix)"—Gloria Estefan | Safe |
| Oscar & Dani | 23 (7, 8, 8) | Jazz | "Addams Groove"—MC Hammer | Eliminated |

Team Dance-off
| Couple | Judges' votes | Dance | Music | Result |
|---|---|---|---|---|
| Camila & Lucas; Lu & Marquinhos; Juliana & Tutu; Pérola & Fernando | Men, Women, Men | Freestyle (Women's Team) | "Single Ladies (Put a Ring on It)"—Beyoncé | Loser |
| Allan & Carol; Amaral & Bruna; Bernardo & Bia; Oscar & Dani | Men, Women, Men | Freestyle (Men's Team) | "Y.M.C.A."—Village People | Winner (3 pts) |

=== Week 9: Rock and Roll Night ===
The couples performed one unlearned dance to iconic rock songs.

Running order

| Couple | Scores | Dance | Music | Result |
|---|---|---|---|---|
| Camila & Lucas | 24 (8, 8, 8) | Pasodoble | "Smells Like Teen Spirit"—Nirvana | Bottom three |
| Lu & Marquinhos | 25 (9, 8, 8) | Rumba | "Love of My Life"—Queen | Bottom three |
| Bernardo & Bia | 27 (9, 9, 9) | Waltz | "Iris"—Goo Goo Dolls | Safe |
| Amaral & Bruna | 23 (7, 8, 8) | Quickstep | "Every Little Thing She Does Is Magic"—The Police | Bottom three |
| Juliana & Tutu | 26 (8, 9, 9) | Quickstep | "Just a Girl"—No Doubt | Safe |
| Allan & Carol | 27 (9, 9, 9) | Jive | "Johnny B. Goode"—Chuck Berry | Safe |
| Pérola & Fernando | 26 (8, 9, 9) | Zouk | "Numb"—Linkin Park | Safe |

After the individual routines were performed, the bottom three couples (Amaral & Bruna, Camila & Lucas and Lu & Marquinhos) competed in a marathon-style instant cha-cha-cha. Since the three couples tied after received one vote each, a new round was made, this time, of an instant tango. With two votes, Lu & Marquinhos received immunity and avoided elimination, while the remaining couples were placed in the Risk Zone. Camila & Lucas received the fewest votes to save and were eliminated over Amaral & Bruna.

Running order

| Couple | Judges' vote | Dance | Music | Result |
|---|---|---|---|---|
| Amaral & Bruna | Lu, Camila, Amaral | Cha-cha-cha | "(I Can't Get No) Satisfaction"—The Rolling Stones | Three-way tie |
| Camila & Lucas | Lu, Camila, Amaral | Cha-cha-cha | "(I Can't Get No) Satisfaction"—The Rolling Stones | Three-way tie |
| Lu & Marquinhos | Lu, Camila, Amaral | Cha-cha-cha | "(I Can't Get No) Satisfaction"—The Rolling Stones | Three-way tie |
| Amaral & Bruna | Lu, Amaral, Lu | Tango | "Come as You Are"—Nirvana | Risk zone |
| Camila & Lucas | Lu, Amaral, Lu | Tango | "Come as You Are"—Nirvana | Eliminated |
| Lu & Marquinhos | Lu, Amaral, Lu | Tango | "Come as You Are"—Nirvana | Safe (Immunity) |

=== Week 10: Semifinals ===
The couples performed an unlearned dance, with one couple being eliminated midway through the show.

Running order (round 1)

| Couple | Scores | Dance | Music | Result |
|---|---|---|---|---|
| Lu & Marquinhos | 26 (9, 8, 9) | Foxtrot | "The Way You Look Tonight"—The Lettermen | Safe |
| Allan & Carol | 28 (9, 10, 9) | Samba | "Expresso 2222"—Gilberto Gil | Safe |
| Juliana & Tutu | 23 (7, 8, 8) | Rumba | "Read All About It, Pt. III"—Emeli Sandé | Eliminated |
| Bernardo & Bia | 24 (8, 8, 8) | Zouk | "Careless Whisper"—George Michael | Risk zone |
| Pérola & Fernando | 29 (9, 10, 10) | Jive | "Umbrella"—Rihanna featuring Jay-Z | Safe |
| Amaral & Bruna | 24 (8, 8, 8) | Foxtrot | "Everything"—Michael Bublé | Risk zone |

Following Juliana & Tutu's elimination, the five remaining couples performed their final unlearned dance.

Running order (round 2)

| Couple | Scores | Dance | Music | Result |
|---|---|---|---|---|
| Lu & Marquinhos | 30 (10, 10, 10) | Jive | "Rock This Town"—Stray Cats | Safe |
| Allan & Carol | 27 (9, 9, 9) | Waltz | "It's a Man's Man's Man's World"—James Brown | Risk zone |
| Bernardo & Bia | 24 (8, 8, 8) | Pasodoble | "Americano"—Lady Gaga | Eliminated |
| Pérola & Fernando | 30 (10, 10, 10) | Foxtrot | "Only You (And You Alone)"—The Platters | Safe |
| Amaral & Bruna | 24 (8, 8, 8) | Zouk | "Cheap Thrills"—Sia featuring Sean Paul | Risk zone |

=== Week 11: Finals ===
The couples performed a redemption dance chosen by the judges and a showdance that fused three previously learned dance styles.

Running order

| Couple | Scores | Dance | Music | Result |
|---|---|---|---|---|
| Pérola & Fernando | 30 (10, 10, 10) | Rumba | "Shallow"—Lady Gaga & Bradley Cooper | Winner |
| Pérola & Fernando | 30 (10, 10, 10) | Showdance | "Natural"—Imagine Dragons | Winner |
| Amaral & Bruna | 27 (9, 9, 9) | Samba | "Agamamou"—Art Popular | Fourth place |
| Amaral & Bruna | 28 (9, 10, 9) | Showdance | "Feel Again"—OneRepublic | Fourth place |
| Lu & Marquinhos | 30 (10, 10, 10) | Pasodoble | "Bring Me to Life"—Evanescence featuring Paul McCoy | Runner-up |
| Lu & Marquinhos | 28 (9, 10, 9) | Showdance | "Shut Up and Dance"—Walk the Moon | Runner-up |
| Allan & Carol | 30 (10, 10, 10) | Tango | "Hands to Myself"—Selena Gomez | Third place |
| Allan & Carol | 30 (10, 10, 10) | Showdance | "The Greatest Show"—Hugh Jackman, Keala Settle, Zac Efron, Zendaya | Third place |

== Dance chart ==
- Week 1: One unlearned dance (First Dances)
- Week 2: One unlearned dance (Life Moments)
- Week 3: One unlearned dance (When I Grow Up)
- Week 4: One unlearned dance (Movie Night)
- Week 5: One unlearned dance (Brazil Night)
- Week 6: One unlearned dance (Michael Jackson Night)
- Week 7: One unlearned dance (Free Theme)
- Week 8: One unlearned dance (Team Dances)
- Week 9: One unlearned dance (Rock and Roll Night)
- Week 10: Two unlearned dances (Semifinals)
- Week 11: Redemption dance and showdance (Finals)

| Couple | 1 | 2 | 3 | 4 | 5 | 6 | 7 | 8 | | 9 | 10 | | 11 | |
|---|---|---|---|---|---|---|---|---|---|---|---|---|---|---|
| Pérola & Fernando | Rumba | Waltz | Quickstep | Tango | Samba | Cha-Cha-Cha | Paso Doble | Salsa | Freestyle (Women's Team) | Zouk | Jive | Foxtrot | Rumba | Showdance |
| Lu & Marquinhos | Paso Doble | Waltz | Cha-Cha-Cha | Tango | Samba | Zouk | Quickstep | Hip-Hop | Freestyle (Women's Team) | Rumba | Foxtrot | Jive | Paso Doble | Showdance |
| Allan & Carol | Tango | Rumba | Foxtrot | Cha-Cha-Cha | Quickstep | Paso Doble | Zouk | Contemporary | Freestyle (Men's Team) | Jive | Samba | Waltz | Tango | Showdance |
| Amaral & Bruna | Pado Doble | Samba | Waltz | Cha-Cha-Cha | Tango | Rumba | Jive | Jazz | Freestyle (Men's Team) | Quickstep | Foxtrot | Zouk | Samba | Showdance |
| Bernardo & Bia | Samba | Foxtrot | Jive | Quickstep | Tango | Cha-Cha-Cha | Rumba | Jazz | Freestyle (Men's Team) | Waltz | Zouk | Paso Doble | | |
| Juliana & Tutu | Cha-Cha-Cha | Paso Doble | Zouk | Jive | Waltz | Tango | Samba | Contemporary | Freestyle (Women's Team) | Quickstep | Rumba | | | |
| Camila & Lucas | Foxtrot | Jive | Waltz | Tango | Zouk | Rumba | Cha-Cha-Cha | Contemporary | Freestyle (Women's Team) | Paso Doble | | | | |
| Oscar & Dani | Jive | Cha-Cha-Cha | Samba | Quickstep | Foxtrot | Rumba | Waltz | Jazz | Freestyle (Men's Team) | | | | | |
| Valéria & Jefferson | Quickstep | Jive | Cha-Cha-Cha | Rumba | Tango | Samba | Foxtrot | | | | | | | |
| Beto & Bella | Jive | Waltz | Quickstep | Paso Doble | Cha-Cha-Cha | Foxtrot | | | | | | | | |
| Nizo & Luana | Foxtrot | Rumba | Quickstep | Tango | Zouk | | | | | | | | | |
| Marcello & Thaiane | Tango | Jive | Rumba | Waltz | | | | | | | | | | |
| Franciele & Lucas | Cha-Cha-Cha | Tango | Jive | | | | | | | | | | | |
| Dadá & Renato | Zouk | Samba | | | | | | | | | | | | |

Highest scoring dance
Lowest scoring dance

== Ratings and reception ==
=== Brazilian ratings ===
All numbers are in points and provided by Kantar Ibope Media.

| Episode | Title | Air date | Timeslot (BRT) | SP viewers (in points) | Source |
|---|---|---|---|---|---|
| 1 | Week 1 | September 26, 2018 | Wednesday 11:00 p.m. | 5.9 | |
| 2 | Week 2 | October 3, 2018 | Wednesday 11:00 p.m. | 6.4 | |
| 3 | Week 3 | October 10, 2018 | Wednesday 11:00 p.m. | 5.3 | |
| 4 | Week 4 | October 17, 2018 | Wednesday 11:00 p.m. | 4.6 | |
| 5 | Week 5 | October 24, 2018 | Wednesday 11:00 p.m. | 6.4 | |
| 6 | Week 6 | October 31, 2018 | Wednesday 11:00 p.m. | 6.2 | |
| 7 | Week 7 | November 7, 2018 | Wednesday 11:00 p.m. | 5.9 | |
| 8 | Week 8 | November 14, 2018 | Wednesday 11:00 p.m. | 6.4 | |
| 9 | Week 9 | November 21, 2018 | Wednesday 11:00 p.m. | 6.0 | |
| 10 | Week 10 | November 28, 2018 | Wednesday 11:00 p.m. | 5.7 | |
| 11 | Winner announced | December 5, 2018 | Wednesday 11:00 p.m. | 7.0 | |

- In 2018, each point represents 248.647 households in 15 market cities in Brazil (71.855 households in São Paulo)
