= Universidade Gama Filho =

Universidade Gama Filho was a private university in Brazil that operated from 1939 to 2014. It was located in the neighborhood of Piedade, in the northern part of Rio de Janeiro. The university originated with the establishment of Colégio Piedade in 1939 by Luiz Gama Filho. The university was founded in 1951. From the 1970s, UGF sports teams gained prominence in state and national competitions. By the 1980s, the university had 30,000 students.

The university was shut down in 2014, due to financial mismanagement. At the time it had the largest medical school in Brazil. Its owner-operator at the time was Galileo Educacional. Another institution managed by Galileo, called Centro Universitário da Cidade do Rio de Janeiro (UniverCidade), was shut down at the same time.

== See also ==
- Centro Universitário da Cidade do Rio de Janeiro (UniverCidade)
