= Cristina Lyra =

Brazilian television presenter

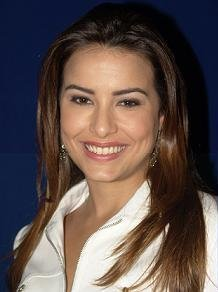
Cristina Lyra

Cristina Lyra Fialho (born April 3, 1976, in Rio de Janeiro), known as Cristina Lyra, is a Brazilian sports and newscaster. She is the weather presenter of RedeTV! and also anchors the sports' broadcasts of the same station.

She is graduated in Journalism from the Centro Universitário da Cidade do Rio de Janeiro (UniverCidade/RJ) in 1997
