= Dancing Brasil season 1 =

Dancing Brasil
- Season 1
- Celebrity winner: Maytê Piragibe
- Professional winner: Paulo Victor Souza
- No. of episodes: 13

Release
- Original network: RecordTV
- Original release: April 3 – June 26, 2017

Season chronology
- Next → Season 2

The first season of Dancing Brasil premiered on Monday, April 3, 2017 at 10:30 p.m. (BRT / AMT) on RecordTV.

== Cast ==
=== Couples ===
Celebrity	Notability (known for)	Professional	Status
Dalton Rangel	Chef	Érica Martinez	Eliminated 1st on April 10, 2017
Guilherme Cardoso	Singer	Alê Brandini	Eliminated 2nd on April 17, 2017
Juliana Silveira	Actress	Weskley Faustino	Withdrew on April 24, 2017
Tony Salles	Singer	Bruna Rocha	Eliminated 3rd on April 24, 2017
Richarlyson	Football player	Camila Moretti	Eliminated 4th on May 1, 2017
MC Gui	Singer	Bella Fernandes	Withdrew on May 8, 2017
Fabíola Gadelha	Journalist	Bruno Kimura	Eliminated 5th on May 8, 2017
Tânia Alves	Actress & singer	Marcos Vedovetto	Eliminated 6th on May 15, 2017
Bianca Rinaldi	Actress	Tutu Morasi	Eliminated 7th on May 29, 2017
Sheila Mello	Actress	Marcelo Vasquez	Eliminated 8th on June 5, 2017
Mika	Actor & singer	Bárbara Guerra	Eliminated 9th on June 12, 2017
Leo Miggiorin	Actor	Dani de Lova	Third place on June 26, 2017
Jade Barbosa	Olympic gymnast	Lucas Teodoro	Runner-up on June 26, 2017
Maytê Piragibe	Actress	Paulo Victor Souza	Winner on June 26, 2017

== Scoring chart ==
Couple	Place	1	2	1+2	3	4	5	6	7	8	9	8+9	10	11	12	13
Maytê & Paulo Victor	1	24	23	47	29	26	28	26	26	25	29	54	25	28+24=52	30+25=55	27+27+30=84
Jade & Teo	2	20	26	46	28	21	25	20	26	30	26	56	30	24+24=48	28+30=58	30+30+28=88
Leo & Dani	3	27	23	50	27	28	23	27	24	30	30	60	26	30+27=57	24+29=53	28+30+27=85
Mika & Bárbara	4	20	24	44	28	28	26	26	25	27	26	53	27	29+27=56		
Sheila & Marcelo	5	22	26	48	30	25	24	25	28	25	30	55	24			
Bianca & Tutu	6	21	26	47	26	29	30	21	24	26	24	50				
Tânia & Marcos	7	19	25	44	23	24	24	24	21							
Fabíola & Bruno	8	18	22	40	26	21	26	20								
MC Gui & Bella	9	19	21	40	22	—	23	—								
Richarlyson & Camila	10	19	26	45	21	25	21									
Tony & Bruna	11	18	25	43	25	23										
Juliana & Weskley	12	22	22	44	—	—										
Guilherme & Alê	13	22	24	46	18											
Dalton & Érica	14	21	20	41												

Key
Lowest score
Highest score
Eliminated
Risk zone
Withdrew
Third place
Runner-up
Winner

== Weekly scores ==
Individual judges' scores in the charts below (given in parentheses) are listed in this order from left to right: Jaime Arôxa, Fernanda Chamma, Paulo Goulart Filho

=== Week 1: First Dances ===
Running order

Couple	Scores	Dance	Music	Result
Bianca & Tutu	21 (7, 7, 7)	Cha-cha-cha	"What Makes You Beautiful"—One Direction	No elimination
Tony & Bruna	18 (6, 6, 6)	Jive	"Runaway Baby"—Bruno Mars	No elimination
Maytê & Paulo Victor	24 (8, 8, 8)	Bolero	"Se Eu Não Te Amasse Tanto Assim"—Ivete Sangalo	No elimination
Richarlyson & Camila	19 (7, 6, 6)	Jive	"É Uma Partida de Futebol"—Skank	No elimination
Juliana & Weskley	22 (8, 7, 7)	Samba	"Magalenha"—Sérgio Mendes	No elimination
Mika & Bárbara	20 (7, 7, 6)	Waltz	"What the World Needs Now Is Love"—Dionne Warwick	No elimination
Fabíola & Bruno	18 (6, 6, 6)	Foxtrot	"Fora da Lei"—Ed Motta	No elimination
Guilherme & Alê	22 (8, 7, 7)	Bolero	"All of Me"—John Legend	No elimination
Tânia & Marcos	19 (6, 7, 6)	Salsa	"Wanna Be Startin' Somethin'"—Michael Jackson	No elimination
Sheila & Marcelo	22 (7, 8, 7)	Foxtrot	"Can't Take My Eyes Off You"—Frankie Valli	No elimination
MC Gui e Bella	19 (7, 6, 6)	Cha-cha-cha	"Treasure"—Bruno Mars	No elimination
Leo & Dani	27 (9, 9, 9)	Tango	"Roxanne"—The Police	No elimination
Jade & Teo	20 (7, 6, 7)	Samba	"Copacabana"—Barry Manilow	No elimination
Dalton & Érica	21 (8, 7, 6)	Cha-cha-cha	"Let's Get Loud"—Jennifer Lopez	No elimination

=== Week 2: No Theme ===
Running order

Couple	Scores	Dance	Music	Result
Fabíola & Bruno	22 (8, 7, 7)	Waltz	"Dangerous Woman"—Ariana Grande	Risk zone
Leo & Dani	23 (8, 8, 7)	Salsa	"Get Lucky"—Daft Punk featuring Pharrell Williams	Safe
Jade & Teo	26 (9, 8, 9)	Bolero	"Make You Feel My Love" —Adele	Safe
Dalton & Érica	20 (7, 7, 6)	Foxtrot	"Whisky A Go Go"—Roupa Nova	Eliminated
Sheila & Marcelo	26 (8, 9, 9)	Samba	"Faith"—George Michael	Safe
Guilherme & Alê	24 (8, 8, 8)	Salsa	"Conga"—Gloria Estefan	Safe
Juliana & Weskley	22 (8, 7, 7)	Bolero	"Mirrors"—Boyce Avenue featuring Fifth Harmony	Safe
Richarlyson & Camila	26 (9, 8, 9)	Rumba	"Thinking Out Loud"—Ed Sheeran	Safe
Maytê & Paulo Victor	23 (8, 8, 7)	Salsa	"She Bangs"—Ricky Martin	Safe
Mika & Bárbara	24 (8, 8, 8)	Samba	"Aquarela do Brasil" —Alexandre Pires	Safe
Tânia & Marcos	25 (9, 8, 8)	Bolero	"Dois Pra Lá, Dois Pra Cá"—Tânia Alves	Safe
MC Gui & Bella	21 (7, 7, 7)	Waltz	"Pela Luz Dos Olhos Teus"—Tom Jobim & Miúcha	Risk zone
Bianca & Tutu	26 (9, 9, 8)	Foxtrot	"I've Got You Under My Skin"—Michael Bublé	Safe
Tony & Bruna	25 (9, 7, 9)	Samba	"Want to Want Me"—Jason Derulo	Safe

=== Week 3: Movie Night ===
Running order

Couple	Scores	Dance	Music	Film	Result
Tânia & Marcos	23 (8, 7, 8)	Cha-cha-cha	"Flashdance... What a Feeling"—Irene Cara	Flashdance	Safe
Mika & Bárbara	28 (10, 9, 9)	Pasodoble	"He's a Pirate"—Klaus Badelt	Pirates of the Caribbean	Safe
Bianca & Tutu	26 (8, 9, 9)	Waltz	"A Swan is Born"—Clint Mansell	Black Swan	Safe
Guilherme & Alê	19 (6, 7, 6)	Samba	"Night Fever"—Bee Gees	Saturday Night Fever	Eliminated
Maytê & Paulo Victor	29 (9, 10, 10)	Tango	"Santa Maria (del Buen Ayre)"—Gotan Project	Shall We Dance?	Safe
Tony & Bruna	25 (9, 8, 8)	Foxtrote	"Singin' in The Rain"—Gene Kelly	Singin' in the Rain	Safe
Jade & Teo	28 (9, 9, 10)	Quickstep	"You're the One That I Want"—Olivia Newton-John	Grease	Safe
MC Gui & Bella	22 (8, 7, 7)	Quickstep	"You've Got a Friend in Me"—Milton Guedes	Toy Story	Risk zone
Sheila & Marcelo	30 (10, 10, 10)	Salsa	"The Time of My Life"—Bill Medley & Jennifer Warnes	Dirty Dancing	Safe
Leo & Dani	27 (9, 9, 9)	Waltz	"Smile" —Michael Jackson	Modern Times	Safe
Fabíola & Bruno	26 (9, 8, 9)	Jive	"You Can't Stop the Beat"—Hairspray cast	Hairspray	Safe
Richarlyson & Camila	21 (7, 7, 7)	Waltz	"Beauty and the Beast"—Ariana Grande & John Legend	Beauty and the Beast	Risk zone

=== Week 4: No Theme ===
Running order

Couple	Scores	Dance	Music	Result
Tony & Bruna	23 (8, 8, 7)	Zouk	"Bird Set Free"—Sia	Eliminated
Jade & Teo	21 (7, 7, 7)	Salsa	"Better When I'm Dancin'"—Meghan Trainor	Risk zone
Sheila & Marcelo	25 (8, 8, 9)	Bolero	"Haunted"—Beyoncé	Safe
Richarlyson & Camila	25 (9, 8, 8)	Cha-cha-cha	"Something's Got a Hold on Me"—Leela James	Safe
Tânia & Marcos	24 (8, 8, 8)	Salsa	"Something Right"—Westlife	Safe
Leo & Dani	28 (9, 10, 9)	Rumba	"I Don't Want to Miss a Thing"—Aerosmith	Safe
Fabíola e Bruno	21 (7, 7, 7)	Zouk	"Bailando"—Enrique Iglesias	Risk zone
Bianca & Tutu	29 (10, 10, 9)	Bolero	"Não Aprendi Dizer Adeus" —Alexandre Nero	Safe
Mika & Bárbara	28 (9, 10, 9)	Salsa	"Thriller" —Michael Jackson	Safe
Maytê & Paulo Victor	26 (9, 8, 9)	Zouk	"One Dance"—Drake	Safe

=== Week 5: Most Memorable Year ===
Running order

Couple	Scores	Dance	Music	Result
Maytê & Paulo Victor	28 (10, 9, 9)	Rumba	"Halo"—Beyoncé	Safe
Mika & Bárbara	26 (9, 9, 8)	Jive	"Happy"—Pharrell Williams	Safe
Jade & Téo	25 (9, 8, 8)	Pasodoble	"Jade's Floor Music 2014"	Safe
Sheila & Marcelo	24 (8, 8, 8)	Waltz	"Your Song"—Elton John	Safe
Leo & Dani	23 (7, 8, 8)	Pasodoble	"The Best"—Tina Turner	Risk zone
Tânia & Marcos	24 (8, 8, 8)	Rumba	"Meu Bem, Meu Mal"—Gal Costa	Safe
Richarlyson & Camila	21 (7, 7, 7)	Bolero	"Corazón Partío"—Alejandro Sanz	Eliminated
Fabíola & Bruno	26 (9, 8, 9)	Salsa	"Festa"—Ivete Sangalo	Safe
MC Gui & Bella	23 (8, 8, 7)	Rumba	"Earned It"—The Weeknd	Risk zone
Bianca & Tutu	30 (10, 10, 10)	Quickstep	"Jai Ho! (You Are My Destiny)"—A. R. Rahman & The Pussycat Dolls	Safe

=== Week 6: 70s Night ===
Running order

Couple	Scores	Dance	Music	Result
Sheila & Marcelo	25 (9, 8, 8)	Cha-cha-cha	"Hot Stuff"—Donna Summer	Safe
Jade & Téo	20 (7, 7, 6)	Tango	"Isn't She Lovely"—Stevie Wonder	Risk zone
Mika & Bárbara	26 (9, 9, 8)	Rumba	"How Deep Is Your Love"—Bee Gees	Safe
Bianca & Tutu	21 (7, 7, 7)	Salsa	"I Am What I Am"—Gloria Gaynor	Risk zone
Tânia & Marcos	24 (8, 8, 8)	Pasodoble	"Don't Let Me Be Misunderstood"—Santa Esmeralda	Safe
Leo & Dani	27 (9, 9, 9)	Foxtrot	"September"—Earth, Wind & Fire	Safe
Fabíola & Bruno	20 (7, 7, 6)	Tango	"I Will Survive"—Gloria Gaynor	Eliminated
Maytê & Paulo Victor	26 (9, 8, 9)	Cha-cha-cha	"It's Raining Men"—The Weather Girls	Safe

=== Week 7: Xuxa Night ===
Running order

Couple	Scores	Dance	Music	Result
Bianca & Tutu	24 (8, 8, 8)	Jive	"Ilariê"	Risk zone
Jade & Téo	26 (9, 8, 9)	Waltz	"Arco-íris"	Safe
Tânia & Marcos	21 (7, 7, 7)	Foxtrot	"Marquei um X"	Eliminated
Maytê & Paulo Victor	26 (8, 9, 9)	Jive	"Tô de Bem com a Vida"	Safe
Mika & Bárbara	25 (9, 8, 8)	Foxtrot	"Brincar de Índio"	Safe
Sheila & Marcelo	28 (9, 10, 9)	Tango	"Tindolelê"	Safe
Leo & Dani	24 (8, 8, 8)	Quickstep	"Festa do Estica e Puxa"	Risk zone

=== Week 8: Switch-Up ===
Running order

Couple	Scores	Dance	Music	Result
Mika & Dani	27 (9, 9, 9)	Hip hop	"Shape of You"—Ed Sheeran	No elimination
Jade & Paulo Victor	30 (10, 10, 10)	Jazz	"Love on the Brain"—Rihanna	No elimination
Bianca & Marcelo	26 (9, 9, 8)	Hip hop	"Formation"—Beyoncé	No elimination
Maytê & Teo	25 (9, 8, 8)	Street jazz	"You Don't Know Me"—Jax Jones featuring Raye	No elimination
Sheila & Tutu	25 (9, 8, 8)	Contemporary	"Gotta Get Thru This"—Daniel Bedingfield	No elimination
Leo & Bárbara	30 (10, 10, 10)	Musical jazz	"Friend Like Me"—Ne-Yo	No elimination

=== Week 9: Switch-Back ===
Running order

Couple	Scores	Dance	Music	Result
Leo & Dani	30 (10, 10, 10)	Jive	"Proud Mary"—Tina Turner	Safe
Bianca & Tutu	24 (8, 8, 8)	Samba	"I Love to Love (But My Baby Loves to Dance)"—Tina Charles	Eliminated
Mika & Bárbara	26 (9, 9, 8)	Bolero	"How Can I Go On"—Freddie Mercury & Montserrat Caballé	Risk zone
Maytê & Paulo Victor	29 (10, 9, 10)	Samba	"Single Ladies (Put a Ring on It)"—Beyoncé	Risk zone
Sheila & Marcelo	30 (10, 10, 10)	Pasodoble	"Boléro"—City of Prague Philharmonic Orchestra	Safe
Jade & Téo	26 (9, 8, 9)	Rumba	"Angel"—Sarah McLachlan	Safe

=== Week 10: June Festival ===
Running order

Couple	Scores	Dance	Music	Result
Mika & Bárbara	27 (9, 9, 9)	Cha-cha-cha	"Piração"—Paula Fernandes	Safe
Sheila & Marcelo	24 (8, 8, 8)	Zouk	"Evidências"—Daniel	Eliminated
Jade & Teo	30 (10, 10, 10)	Cha-cha-cha	"Não Precisa"—Paula Fernandes	Safe
Leo & Dani	26 (8, 9, 9)	Zouk	"Eu Só Quero Um Xodó"—Paula Fernandes	Risk zone
Maytê & Paulo Victor	25 (9, 8, 8)	Foxtrot	"A Jiripoca Vai Piar"—Daniel	Risk zone

=== Week 11: Lover's Night ===
Running order

Couple	Scores	Dance	Music	Result
Jade & Teo	24 (8, 8, 8)	Zouk	"Just the Way You Are"—Bruno Mars	Risk zone
Mika & Bárbara	29 (9, 10, 10)	Quickstep	"You Can't Hurry Love"—The Supremes	Eliminated
Maytê & Paulo Victor	28 (9, 9, 10)	Waltz	"Anos Dourados"—Tom Jobim & Chico Buarque	Risk zone
Leo & Dani	30 (10, 10, 10)	Cha-cha-cha	"Everything"—Michael Bublé	Safe
Leo & Dani; Mika & Bárbara	27 (9, 9, 9)	Foxtrot; Salsa	"I Just Called to Say I Love You"—Stevie Wonder	
Jade & Teo; Maytê & Paulo Victor	24 (8, 8, 8)	Foxtrot; Salsa	"Walking on Sunshine" —Katrina and the Waves	

=== Week 12: Semifinals ===
Running order

Couple	Scores	Dance	Music	Result
Maytê & Paulo Victor	30 (10, 10, 10)	Pasodoble	"Livin' on a Prayer"—Bon Jovi	No elimination
Maytê & Paulo Victor	25 (9, 8, 8)	Quickstep	"Aquela dos 30"—Sandy	No elimination
Jade & Teo	28 (9, 10, 9)	Foxtrot	"Haven't Met You Yet"—Michael Bublé	No elimination
Jade & Teo	30 (10, 10, 10)	Jive	"Amei Te Ver"—Tiago Iorc	No elimination
Leo & Dani	24 (8, 8, 8)	Samba	"Madalena"—Sandy	No elimination
Leo & Dani	29 (10, 9, 10)	Bolero	"Don't Know Why"—Norah Jones	No elimination

=== Week 13: Finals ===
Running order

Couple	Scores	Dance	Music	Result
Maytê & Paulo Victor	27 (9, 9, 9)	Salsa	"La Vida Es Un Carnaval"—Celia Cruz	Winner
Maytê & Paulo Victor	27 (9, 9, 9)	Charleston	"Yes Sir, That's My Baby"—Frank Sinatra	Winner
Maytê & Paulo Victor	30 (10, 10, 10)	Tango	"La Cumparsita"—Gerardo Matos Rodríguez	Winner
Leo & Dani	28 (9, 9, 10)	Salsa	"Vivir Mi Vida" —Marc Anthony	Third place
Leo & Dani	30 (10, 10, 10)	Charleston	"Cabaret"—Liza Minnelli	Third place
Leo & Dani	27 (9, 9, 9)	Tango	"I Have Nothing"—Whitney Houston	Third place
Jade & Teo	30 (10, 10, 10)	Tango	"Cell Block Tango"—Chita Rivera	Runner-up
Jade & Teo	30 (10, 10, 10)	Charleston	"Puttin' On the Ritz"—Fred Astaire	Runner-up
Jade & Teo	28 (9, 9, 10)	Cha-cha-cha	"Give Me Your Love"—Sigala featuring John Newman & Nile Rodgers	Runner-up

== Dance chart ==
- Week 1: One unlearned dance (First Dances)
- Week 2: One unlearned dance (No Theme)
- Week 3: One unlearned dance (Movie Night)
- Week 4: One unlearned dance (No Theme)
- Week 5: One unlearned dance (Most Memorable Year)
- Week 6: One unlearned dance (70s Night)
- Week 7: One unlearned dance (Xuxa Night)
- Week 8: One unlearned dance (Switch-Up)
- Week 9: One unlearned dance (Switch-Back)
- Week 10: One unlearned dance (June Festival)
- Week 11: One unlearned dance and team dances (Lovers' Night)
- Week 12: Two unlearned dances (Semifinals)
- Week 13: Redemption dance, Charleston and Favourite style (Finals)

Couple	Week 1	Week 2	Week 3	Week 4	Week 5	Week 6	Week 7	Week 8	Week 9	Week 10	Week 11		Week 12		Week 13		
Maytê & Paulo Victor	Bolero	Salsa	Tango	Zouk	Rumba	Cha-cha-cha	Jive	Street jazz (with Teo)	Samba	Foxtrot	Waltz	Foxtrot Salsa	Paso doble	Quickstep	Salsa	Charleston	Tango
Jade & Teo	Samba	Bolero	Quickstep	Salsa	Paso doble	Tango	Waltz	Jazz (with Paulo Victor)	Rumba	Cha-cha-cha	Zouk	Foxtrot Salsa	Foxtrot	Jive	Tango	Charleston	Cha-Cha-Cha
Leo & Dani	Tango	Salsa	Waltz	Rumba	Paso doble	Foxtrot	Quickstep	Musical jazz (with Bárbara)	Jive	Zouk	Cha-cha-cha	Foxtrot Salsa	Samba	Bolero	Salsa	Charleston	Tango
Mika & Bárbara	Waltz	Samba	Paso doble	Salsa	Jive	Rumba	Foxtrot	Hip hop (with Dani)	Bolero	Cha-cha-cha	Quickstep	Foxtrot Salsa					
Sheila & Marcelo	Foxtrot	Samba	Salsa	Bolero	Waltz	Cha-Cha-Cha	Tango	Contemporary (with Tutu)	Paso doble	Zouk							
Bianca & Tutu	Cha-Cha-Cha	Foxtrot	Waltz	Bolero	Quickstep	Salsa	Jive	Hip-hop (with Marcelo)	Samba								
Tânia & Marcos	Salsa	Bolero	Cha-Cha-Cha	Salsa	Rumba	Paso Doble	Foxtrot										
Fabíola & Bruno	Foxtrot	Waltz	Jive	Zouk	Salsa	Tango											
MC Gui & Bella	Cha-Cha-Cha	Waltz	Quickstep	—	Rumba												
Richarlyson & Camila	Jive	Rumba	Waltz	Cha-Cha-Cha	Bolero												
Tony & Bruna	Jive	Samba	Foxtrot	Zouk													
Juliana & Weskley	Samba	Bolero	—														
Guilherme & Alê	Bolero	Salsa	Samba														
Dalton & Érica	Cha-Cha-Cha	Foxtrot															

Highest scoring dance
Lowest scoring dance

== Ratings and reception ==
=== Brazilian ratings ===
All numbers are in points and provided by Kantar Ibope Media.

Episode	Title	Air date	Timeslot (BRT)	SP viewers (in points)	Source
1	Week 1	April 3, 2017	Monday 10:30 p.m.	5.0	
2	Week 2	April 10, 2017	Monday 10:30 p.m.	5.0	
3	Week 3	April 17, 2017	Monday 10:30 p.m.	4.8	
4	Week 4	April 24, 2017	Monday 10:30 p.m.	5.4	
5	Week 5	May 1, 2017	Monday 10:30 p.m.	6.0	
6	Week 6	May 8, 2017	Monday 10:30 p.m.	5.9	
7	Week 7	May 15, 2017	Monday 10:30 p.m.	6.4	
8	Week 8	May 22, 2017	Monday 10:30 p.m.	6.3	
9	Week 9	May 29, 2017	Monday 10:30 p.m.	5.6	
10	Week 10	June 5, 2017	Monday 10:30 p.m.	6.6	
11	Week 11	June 12, 2017	Monday 10:30 p.m.	6.9	
12	Week 12	June 19, 2017	Monday 10:30 p.m.	6.1	
13	Winner announced	June 26, 2017	Monday 10:30 p.m.	7.2	

- In 2017, each point represents 245.700 households in 15 market cities in Brazil (70.500 households in São Paulo).
