= Camila Rodrigues =

Camila Rodrigues may refer to:

- Camila Rodrigues (actress) (born 1983), Brazilian actress
- Camila Rodrigues (footballer) or Camila (born 1994), Brazilian footballer known by the mononym Camila
