= Flávio José =

Brazilian composer and singer (born 1951)

- Born: Flávio José Marcelino Remígio
- Origin: Monteiro, Paraíba, Brazil
- Genres: Forró
- Instruments: Vocals, accordion
- Website: www.flaviojose.com.br

Flávio José (born Flávio José Marcelino Remígio in Monteiro) is a Brazilian composer and singer.

== Discography ==
=== Studio albums ===
- 1977 - Só Confio em Tu
- 1994 - Nordestino Lutador
- 1995 - Tareco e Mariola
- 1996 - O Melhor de Flávio José
- 1996 - Filho do Dono
- 1997 - Sem Ferrolho e Sem Tramela
- 1998 - A Poeira e a Estrada
- 1999 - Para Todo Mundo
- 1999 - Ao Vivo Sempre
- 2000 - Seu Olhar Não Mente (BMG International, N.V.)
- 2001 - Me Diz, Amor! (Sony BMG)
- 2002 - Palavras ao Vento
- 2003 - Cidadão Comum
- 2003 - Acústico
- 2004 - Pra amar e ser feliz
- 2005 - O Poeta Cantador
- 2006 - Tá bom que tá danado
- 2008 - Dom Cristalino
