= Centro Universitário da Cidade do Rio de Janeiro =

University in Rio de Janeiro, Brazil

- Type: Private, Philanthropy
- Active: 1969–2014
- Rector: Ronald Levinsohn
- Students: 11,231 (2012)
- Location: Rio de Janeiro, RJ, Brazil
- Website: www.univercidade.br

The Centro Universitário da Cidade do Rio de Janeiro (UniverCidade) was a higher education institution. Based in the city of Rio de Janeiro, the university center was founded in 1969 and maintained by the Associação Educacional São Paulo Apóstolo, a philanthropic entity controlled by Ronald Levinsohn. It offered undergraduate courses in the humanities, exact and Biology areas, and lato sensu and stricto sensu postgraduate programs. It was the third largest private college in Rio de Janeiro and had 35 thousand students.

== History ==
=== Fraud ===
According to Alberto Dines, the institution was used for money laundering, covering up the illicit origin of the fortune of businessman Ronald Levinsohn, former controller of UniverCidade.

Ronald Levinsohn was rector of the University Center of the City of Rio de Janeiro, which with the Iguaçu University (UNIG) and the Candido Mendes University (UCAM) were cited in the request for the establishment of a Parliamentary Commission of Inquiry (CPI) in the State Legislative Assembly of Rio de Janeiro (ALERJ) to investigate allegations of fraudulent management, illicit enrichment, embezzlement of public resources, money laundering, precarious work relationships, moral harassment, repression of representatives of teachers, students and employees, creation of monopolies, deterioration of quality of teaching, among others.

According to ALERJ, the main complaints contained in the Parliamentary Commission's report are delays and lack of payments to employees, as well as union dues, the Instituto Nacional do Seguro Social (INSS) and the Service Time Guarantee Fund (FGTS); in distance education, suspicion of fraud and sale of diplomas and lack of regulation by the Chamber of Deputies; foreign groups and corporations running private universities in Rio de Janeiro; irregularities in financial reports; scholarship systems, such as the Higher Education Student Financing Fund (FIES) and the University for All Program (ProUni), awarded to institutions with low ratings according to the evaluation of the Ministry of Education (MEC); abusive increase in monthly fees; and agreements with city halls without public bidding.

=== De-accreditation by the MEC ===
In January 2011, it was reported that the institution would lose its administrative autonomy in the Law course, due to consecutive unsatisfactory results in the assessments of the National Student Performance Exam (Enade), which were reflected in the General Course Index (IGC). Therefore, the institution could no longer expand vacancies. UniverCidade received, for three years in a row, grades lower than 3 in the IGC in that course.

On January 13, 2014, due to financial problems and the management crisis (including students being left without their documentation in full), the MEC decided to deaccredit UniverCidade.

Its owner-operator at the time was Galileo Educacional; another institution managed by Galileo, called Universidade Gama Filho, was shut down at the same time.

== Notable alumni ==
- Cristina Lyra
- Fiorella Mattheis
- Geovanna Tominaga
- Sérgio Cabral Filho

== See also ==
- Universidade Gama Filho
