= Ronald Levinsohn =

Brazilian businessman (1935–2020)

- Born: October 9, 1935; Rio Grande, Rio Grande do Sul, Brazil
- Died: January 27, 2020 (aged 84); Rio de Janeiro, Brazil
- Occupation: Businessman

Ronald Guimarães Levinsohn (9 October 1935 – 27 January 2020) was a Brazilian businessman and owner of the Delfin Group. He was involved in a multi-billion-dollar corruption and embezzlement scandal related to the National Housing Bank of Brazil in the 1980s.

== Career ==
In 1975, Levinsohn partnered with Rodman Rockefeller (son of Nelson Rockefeller) on the Cidade Vista Verde project, a planned residential development featuring open layout and extensive vegetation in the city of São José dos Campos. Today, it is a neighborhood near a Petrobras refinery. Levinsohn purchased the land where the Jardim Colinas condominium, Colinas Shopping, and Jardim do Golfe residential subdivision are now located.

He owned the Delfin Group, which in the 1980s maintained 3.5 million savings accounts, the largest portfolio in Brazil at the time.

At the end of 1982, journalist José Carlos de Assis published an exposé alleging that Delfin had settled its debt with the National Housing Bank (BNH) while retaining a significant outstanding balance.

In 1982, an agreement provided for the transfer of two land plots to settle a 60 billion Cr$ debt. However, the plots were valued at approximately 9 billion Cr$, about one-sixth of the debt. The settlement of the debt through this allegedly irregular agreement involved the names of ministers Mário Andreazza (Interior), Delfim Netto (Planning), and Ernane Galvêas (Finance), none of whom were charged or convicted.

The Central Bank of Brazil published the official act closing the extrajudicial liquidation of the Delfin Group in the Diário Oficial da União on November 22, 1991. When the institution was closed, many customers lost their savings.

In 2006, the Superior Court of Justice ruled that the land transfer to the BNH had been conducted legally and at a fair price, although independent appraisals valued the properties significantly lower.

Levinsohn also controlled the Centro Universitário da Cidade do Rio de Janeiro, the third-largest private university in Rio de Janeiro, with approximately 35,000 students. He was accused of using the institution for money laundering. A Legislative Assembly of the State of Rio de Janeiro (ALERJ) inquiry commission reported alleged irregularities, including labor violations and diploma sales.
