= Monteiro =

Municipality in Paraíba, Brazil

Coordinates: 7.88889°S 37.12°W

- Municipality
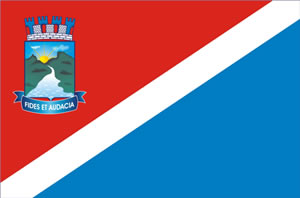
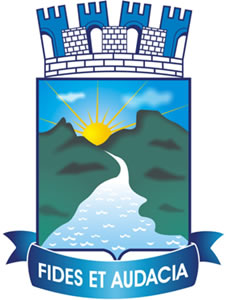
- Flag Coat of arms
- Nickname: "Terra de Esperanças" (Land of Hopes)
- Location of Monteiro in Paraíba and Brazil
- Country: Brazil
- Region: Northeast
- State: Paraíba
- Mesoregion: Boborema

Population (2020)
  - Total: 33,433
- Time zone: UTC−3 (BRT)

Monteiro (Portuguese pronunciation: [mõˈte(j).ɾu]) is a municipality in the state of Paraíba in the Northeast Region of Brazil. It is the largest municipality in the state in terms of area.

Monteiro has one Sister city:

- Tabira, Brazil

== Climate ==
Climate data for Monteiro (1981–2010)
Month	Jan	Feb	Mar	Apr	May	Jun	Jul	Aug	Sep	Oct	Nov	Dec	Year
Mean daily maximum °C (°F)	32.6 (90.7)	32.2 (90.0)	31.7 (89.1)	30.7 (87.3)	29.5 (85.1)	28.1 (82.6)	28.0 (82.4)	29.1 (84.4)	31.1 (88.0)	32.5 (90.5)	33.0 (91.4)	33.0 (91.4)	31.0 (87.8)
Daily mean °C (°F)	25.8 (78.4)	25.6 (78.1)	25.4 (77.7)	24.8 (76.6)	23.7 (74.7)	22.3 (72.1)	22.0 (71.6)	22.4 (72.3)	23.8 (74.8)	25.1 (77.2)	25.8 (78.4)	26.1 (79.0)	24.4 (75.9)
Mean daily minimum °C (°F)	20.1 (68.2)	20.1 (68.2)	20.5 (68.9)	20.1 (68.2)	19.1 (66.4)	17.7 (63.9)	17.2 (63.0)	16.6 (61.9)	17.4 (63.3)	18.9 (66.0)	19.8 (67.6)	20.3 (68.5)	19.0 (66.2)
Average precipitation mm (inches)	58.7 (2.31)	83.5 (3.29)	113.3 (4.46)	96.0 (3.78)	113.8 (4.48)	48.2 (1.90)	36.0 (1.42)	18.8 (0.74)	7.8 (0.31)	21.6 (0.85)	15.6 (0.61)	38.2 (1.50)	651.5 (25.65)
Average precipitation days (≥ 1.0 mm)	4	6	8	7	9	6	4	3	1	1	1	2	52
Average relative humidity (%)	61.9	66.6	71.8	76.2	77.7	78.4	77.8	70.9	63.6	60.1	58.8	60.0	68.7
Mean monthly sunshine hours	235.9	212.2	227.7	210.9	198.6	181.2	193.3	231.4	266.4	280.7	277.4	247.6	2,763.3
Source: Instituto Nacional de Meteorologia

== See also ==
- List of municipalities in Paraíba
