= Théo Becker =

Brazilian actor and singer (born 1976)

Theo Becker
- Theo in 2016
- Born: Theo Becker Oliveira; November 24, 1976 (age 49); Pelotas, Rio Grande do Sul, Brazil
- Occupations: Actor, model and singer
- Years active: 2000-present
- Spouse: Raphaela Lamim (2014–present)
- Modeling information
- Height: 1.84 m (6 ft 0 in)
- Hair color: Brown
- Eye color: Blue
- Website: www.theobecker.com.br

Theo Becker Oliveira (born November 24, 1976) is a Brazilian actor, model and singer.

== Biography ==
Theo was born in Pelotas, where he began surfing at the age of 6 under the influence of his father. He began working as a model in Rio de Janeiro in November 2001, and starred on the cover of G Magazine. His TV debut was at the program Paquito Planet Xuxa. After that, he acted in soap operas like Family Ties and Desires of Women and in a teenage series, Malhação.

He was invited by James Santiago and Rossano Herval to star in the remake of the novel The Slave Isaura, Rede Record. He also acted in the soap operas Proof of Love, The Ways of the Heart, and Os Mutantes - Caminhos do Coração. During his performances he composed several songs, including Marks in the Sand, Adriana (who was later titled Andressa Oliveira), and Fast.

He was knighted in 2008 by the City Council in Pelotas (RS), his hometown.

Oliveira also participated in the first edition of the reality show A Fazenda in 2009. He was considered as the most "controversial" participant in the history of reality shows in Brazil. His participation earned high ratings for Rede Record. He was eliminated in the third week of the show. His elimination was due to several fights with the participants and his moments of emotional disarray, which ended up giving him more notoriety. After leaving the program, he signed a four-year contract with the broadcaster.

Currently, he performs with his band, where they play classics of the 1980s and feature original compositions.
