= Geovanna Tominaga =

Brazilian actress and television host

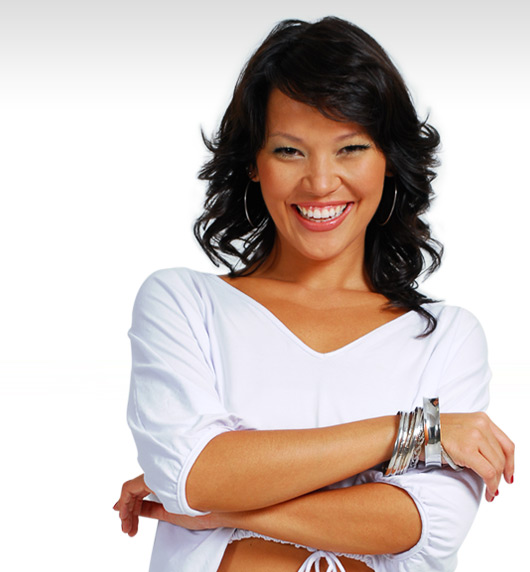
- Born: Geovanna de Oliveira Tominaga; April 12, 1980 (age 46); São José dos Campos São Paulo, Brazil
- Occupations: Actress and TV host
- Years active: 1992–present

Geovanna de Oliveira Tominaga (born April 12, 1980) is a Brazilian actress and television host.

== Biography ==
Tominaga is of Japanese, Italian and Amerindian descent. She started her career when she was 12 years old, working in a show of Angélica, in Rede Manchete. After a brief stint as an actress, she became a host of TV Globinho, for children. She is the current host of Video Show on Globo TV, along with other people. During her live show, Tominaga was interviewing actress Suzana Vieira when she suddenly took the microphone from Tominaga's hands. Vieira said she had "no patience for a person who is starting". The episode ended up on YouTube and became a hit.

In 2008, she started studying journalism at the former Centro Universitário da Cidade do Rio de Janeiro (UniverCidade) but ended up graduating from Universidade Estácio de Sá.
