= 2025 in Irish television =

The following is a list of events relating to television in Ireland from 2025.

== Events ==
=== January ===
- 1 January – RTÉ One's New Year's Eve celebrations include a special edition of The Late Late Show at 10.20pm presented by Patrick Kielty with performances from the RTÉ Concert Orchestra.
- 4 January – The postponed Series 12 of Ireland's Fittest Family begins airing on RTÉ One.

=== February ===
- 7 February – Norwegian singer Emmy is chosen to represent Ireland in the Eurovision Song Contest 2025 with the song "Laika Party". The winner is chosen by combined votes of the public vote, an international jury and a national jury on the Late Late Show Eurosong Special.
- 14 February – The 21st Irish Film & Television Awards are held at the Dublin Royal Convention Centre and are broadcast on 15 February on RTÉ 1.
- 22 February – The Cummins family from County Kilkenny, coached by Davy Fitzgerald, win Series 12 of Ireland's Fittest Family.

=== March ===
- 5 March – A new product placement deal is announced with the soap Fair City that will see Phelan's shop become a Lidl supermarket.
- 16 March – Rhys McClenaghan alongside partner Laura Nolan win series 8 of Dancing with the Stars.

=== May ===
- 7 May – RTÉ asks the European Broadcasting Union for a discussion about Israel's inclusion in the Eurovision Song Contest because of the continuing war in Gaza.
- 15 May – "Laika Party" by Emmy fails to qualify for the final of the Eurovision Song Contest.

=== June ===
- 3 June – In an e-mail to staff, Adam Smyth, the director of BBC Northern Ireland, says the BBC has "no intention" of blocking its news or other output in the Republic of Ireland.

=== July ===
- 3 July – The partner of Ashling Murphy reaches a settlement with BBC Northern Ireland over a defamation case concerning a November 2023 edition of The View which discussed his victim impact statement.

=== August ===
- 19 August – The Laois Rose, Katelyn Cummins wins the 2025 Rose of Tralee which was shown on RTÉ 1 over two nights.
- 29 August – It is announced that David McCullagh will leave his position as RTÉ News: Six One co-presenter to move to RTÉ Radio 1 as the successor to Claire Byrne on Today With... in November.
- 31 August –
  - Dolphins: Wonders of the Ocean starts on RTÉ 1.
  - The Traitors Ireland debuts on RTÉ 1.

=== September ===
- 11 September – RTÉ says it will not take part in the 2026 Eurovision Song Contest "if the participation of Israel goes ahead".
- 23 September – Vanessa Ogbonna wins series 1 of The Traitors Ireland.
- 24 September – Mary Wilson and Aine Lawlor make their final appearances as presenters on Morning Ireland. Wilson officially retires from RTÉ, whereas Lawlor has announced she is stepping back from the show, but will continue to present The Week in Politics.
- 25 September – Head judge Loraine Barry announces her departure from Dancing with the Stars after eight years on the panel.
- 29 September – The three candidates in the 2025 Irish presidential election take part in their first presidential debate on Virgin Media One's The Tonight Show.

=== October ===
- 1 October – RTÉ confirms that Dancing with the Stars will return for its ninth series, with former Strictly Come Dancing professional, Oti Mabuse taking over the role as Head Judge. It is also announced that RTÉ 2fm presenter and Season 7 runner-up, Laura Fox will fill in for Doireann Garrihy while she is on maternity leave.
- 5 October – The presidential candidates participate in the second televised debate of the campaign on RTÉ One's The Week in Politics.
- 9 October – RTÉ announces that broadcaster Ray D'Arcy has been fired.
- 21 October – The final televised presidential debate is held on RTÉ One's Prime Time.

=== November ===
- 11 November – Christine Lampard hosts the 10th Royal Television Society Northern Ireland Awards at Titanic Belfast.
- 23 November – It is announced that Denys Samson, Salome Chachua and Simone Arena will not return for the ninth series of Dancing with the Stars, and that they will be replaced by Arianna Favaro, James Cutler and Leonardo Lini. It is also announced that Kylee Vincent will return to the show having taken the previous season off to give birth.
- 28 November – Virgin Media More is quietly closed down and replaced by a barker channel on Virgin Media channel 100.

=== December ===
- 4 December – RTÉ announces that it will not broadcast, nor will Ireland participate in, the 2026 Eurovision Song Contest, because the European Broadcasting Union have permitted Israel to take part.
- 5 December –
  - RTÉ announce Tommy Meskill as David McCullagh's replacement as co-presenter of RTÉ News: Six One, alongside Sharon Tobin.
  - The Late Late Toy Show is shown on RTÉ 1 and themed around the Christmas movie The Grinch with the opening of the show narrated by Liam Neeson. The show was RTÉ's most watched programme of 2025, with an average television audience of 1.7 million people watching over the weekend.
- 21 December – The McKenna family from Monaghan, coached by Andrew Trimble, win Series 13 of Ireland's Fittest Family.
- 31 December – RTÉ One's New Year's Eve celebrations include a special edition of The Late Late Show from 10.25pm presented by Patrick Kielty with performances from David Gray, Lyra, Garron Noone and Sharon Shannon, and a live countdown from Dublin Castle with a performance from Inhaler. Irish athlete Kate O'Connor, Olympic rower Fintan McCarthy, architect Dermot Bannon and cast members from The Traitors Ireland also appear on the show.

== Debuts ==
- 31 August – Dolphins: Wonders of the Ocean on RTÉ 1.
- 31 August – The Traitors Ireland on RTÉ 1.

== Ongoing television programmes ==
=== 1960s ===
- RTÉ News: Nine O'Clock (1961–present)
- RTÉ News: Six One (1962–present)
- The Late Late Show (1962–present)

=== 1970s ===
- The Late Late Toy Show (1975–present)
- The Sunday Game (1979–present)

=== 1980s ===
- Fair City (1989–present)
- RTÉ News: One O'Clock (1989–present)

=== 1990s ===
- Would You Believe (1990s–present)
- Winning Streak (1990–present)
- Prime Time (1992–present)
- Nuacht RTÉ (1995–present)
- Nuacht TG4 (1996–present)
- Reeling In the Years (1999–present)
- Ros na Rún (1996–present)
- Virgin Media News (1998–present)
- Ireland AM (1999–present)
- Telly Bingo (1999–present)

=== 2000s ===
- Nationwide (2000–present)
- Virgin Media News (2001–present) – now known as the 5.30
- Against the Head (2003–present)
- news2day (2003–present)
- Other Voices (2003–present)
- The Week in Politics (2006–present)
- At Your Service (2008–present)
- Two Tube (2009–present)

=== 2010s ===
- Room to Improve (2007–present)
- Jack Taylor (2010–present)
- Mrs. Brown's Boys (2011–present)
- MasterChef Ireland (2011–present)
- Today (2012–present)
- The Works (2012–present)
- Second Captains Live (2013–present)
- Ireland's Fittest Family (2014–present)
- The Restaurant (2015–present)
- Red Rock (2015–present)
- First Dates (2016–present)
- Dancing with the Stars (2017–2020, 2022–present)
- The Tommy Tiernan Show (2017–present)

=== 2020s ===
- The Style Counsellors (2020–present)
- The 2 Johnnies' Late Night Lock In (2023–present)

== Ending this year ==
- 26 May- Upfront with Katie Hannon (2023–2025)
