= Ervinas Merfeldas =

Irish dancer and choreographer (born 2002)

- Born: 18 August 2002 (age 24); Celbridge, Kildare, Ireland
- Occupations: Dancer; Choreographer

Ervinas Merfeldas (born 18 August 2002) is an Irish ballroom and Latin dancer and choreographer.

== Early life ==
Merfeldas was born in Celbridge in Kildare to Lithuanian parents. He attended Scoil Na Mainistreach. He has a younger brother.

== Career ==
Merfeldas has been dancing since the age of seven, training in ballroom and Latin styles.

In 2016, Merfeldas partnered with Gabija Raciute and competed in the WDSF World Championship in Romania. In 2017, Merfeldas and Raciute finished in fifth place in the British Dance Federation Junior Latin Championships. In 2019, they reached the final of the World Dance Championships - Latin discipline, ultimately finishing in sixth place. In 2022, it was announced that Merfeldas would make his acting debut in The Blonde Bombshell, a stage show based on Marilyn Monroe's life scheduled to premiere on 20 November 2022 at The Helix, Dublin.

== Dancing with the Stars ==
On 22 December 2021, Merfeldas was announced as one of the new professional dancers joining the fifth series of the Irish edition of Dancing with the Stars. Merfeldas was partnered with model and influencer Missy Keating, daughter of Ronan Keating and Yvonne Connolly. Merfeldas and Keating performed their first routine on the opening week of the show on 9 January 2022, receiving mixed reviews from the judges and a score of 16. They received high praise in Week 4 for their Contemporary Ballroom routine inspired by the film Wolfwalkers. In the sixth week, Keating tested positive for COVID-19, resulting in the couple being unable to dance and receiving a bye to the following week. On 20 February 2022, Keating and Merfeldas were eliminated from the competition following a dance-off against Erica-Cody and Denys Samson.

On 4 March, it was announced that Merfeldas would partner Erica-Cody after her regular partner, Denys Samson, tested positive for COVID-19. On 13 March, it was announced that Merfeldas would partner Ellen Keane after her regular partner, Stephen Vincent, tested positive for COVID-19. Merfeldas was publicly praised for his contribution and ability to step in at short notice.

Merfeldas returned for the sixth series in 2023, partnered with Republic of Ireland footballer, Stephanie Roche. They were the fourth couple eliminated after the first dance-off against Suzanne Jackson and Michael Danilczuk.

Merfeldas returned for the seventh series in 2024, partnered with Ireland AM presenter, Katja Mia. They were the sixth couple eliminated, losing their dance-off to Blu Hydrangea & Simone Arena.

Merfeldas returned for the eighth series in 2025, partnered with social media personality, Kayleigh Trappe. They reached the final, finishing as joint runners-up to Rhys McClenaghan & Laura Nolan.

Merfeldas returned for the ninth series in 2026, partnered with Fair City actress, Stephanie Kelly.

Series	Partner	Place
5	Missy Keating	9th
6	Stephanie Roche	8th
7	Katja Mia	6th
8	Kayleigh Trappe	2nd
9	Stephanie Kelly	7th

Highest and Lowest Scoring Per Dance

Dance	Partner	Highest	Partner	Lowest
American Smooth	Katja Mia	26	Missy Keating	16
Cha-cha-cha	Katja Mia	24	Stephanie Roche	13
Charleston	Katja Mia	27	Stephanie Roche	23
Contemporary Ballroom	Kayleigh Trappe	29	Missy Keating	24
Foxtrot	Katja Mia	22	Stephanie Roche	13
Jive	Kayleigh Trappe	28		
Paso Doble	Katja Mia	23	Stephanie Roche	14
Quickstep	Kayleigh Trappe	21		
Rumba	Kayleigh Trappe	35		
Salsa	Kayleigh Trappe	38	Stephanie Roche	17
Samba	Kayleigh Trappe	30	Stephanie Roche	19
Showdance	Kayleigh Trappe	38		
Tango	Kayleigh Trappe	35	Missy Keating	22
Viennese Waltz	Kayleigh Trappe	29	Katja Mia	23
Waltz				

Series 5 – with celebrity partner Missy Keating

Week No.	Dance/Song	Judges' score			Total	Result
Week No.	Dance/Song	Redmond	Barry	Gourounlian	Total	Result
1	American Smooth / "Baby Love"	4	6	6	16	No elimination
2	No dance performed	-	-	-	-	No elimination
3	Samba / "Dynamite"	7	7	7	21	Safe
4	Contemporary Ballroom / "Running with the Wolves"	8	8	8	24	Safe
5	Tango / "Prisoner"	7	7	8	22	Safe
6*	Viennese Waltz / No dance performed	-	-	-	-	Given bye
7	Charleston / "Out Out"	8	8	8	24	Eliminated

*Due to Keating testing positive for COVID-19, the couple did not dance in Week 6 but were given a bye to compete in the following week.

Series 6 – with celebrity partner Stephanie Roche

Week No.	Dance/Song	Judges' score			Total	Result
Week No.	Dance/Song	Redmond	Barry	Gourounlian	Total	Result
1	Cha-cha-cha / "Crazy What Love Can Do"	4	4	5	13	No elimination
2	Foxtrot / "Love Song"	4	5	4	13	No elimination
3	Charleston / "Hustle"	7	8	8	23	Safe
4	Salsa / "Rhythm of the Night"	5	6	6	17	Safe
5	Paso Doble / "Edge of Seventeen"	4	5	5	14	Safe
6	Contemporary Ballroom / "Fight Song"	7	8	8	23	No elimination
7	Samba / "Con Calma"	6	6	7	19	Eliminated

Series 7 – with celebrity partner Katja Mia

Week No.	Dance/Song	Judges' score			Total	Result
Week No.	Dance/Song	Redmond	Barry	Gourounlian	Total	Result
1	Samba / "My Love"	7	7	7	21	No elimination
2	Foxtrot / "Killer Queen"	7	7	8	22	No elimination
3	Cha-cha-cha / "Cuff It"	8	8	8	24	Safe
4	Paso Doble / "Queen of the Night"	7	8	8	23	Safe
5	Viennese Waltz / "Keep Holding On"	7	8	8	23	Safe
6	Tango / "Sisters Are Doing It for Themselves"	8	9	9	26	No elimination
7	Charleston / "I Need You"	9	9	9	27	Safe
8	American Smooth / "Everlasting Love"	8	9	9	26	Bottom two
9	Salsa / "Levitating"; Team Dance / "Electric Energy"	9; 10	9; 9	10; 9	28; 28	Eliminated

Series 8 – with celebrity partner Kayleigh Trappe

Week No.	Dance/Song	Judges' score				Total	Result
Week No.	Dance/Song	Redmond	Byrne	Barry	Gourounlian	Total	Result
1	Jive / "Yes"	7	7	7	7	28	No elimination
2	Viennese Waltz / "Timeless"	7	7	7	8	29	No elimination
3	Cha-cha-cha / "Espresso"	6	6	6	6	24	Safe
4	Quickstep / "The Aristocats"	7	7	-	7	21	Safe
5	Contemporary Ballroom / "Brave"	7	7	8	7	29	Safe
6	Samba / "Fuego"	7	7	8	8	30	Safe
7	Salsa / "Let There Be Love"	8	8	8	8	32	Safe
8	Charleston / "That's Entertainment"	8	8	8	8	32	Safe
9	Rumba / "I Will Always Love You"; Team Dance / "Footloose"	8; 8	8; 9	8; 9	9; 9	33; 35	Safe
10	Tango / "Hot to Go!"; Scare-a-thon / "Time Warp"	8 Couple	9 awarded	9; 3	9 points	35; 38	Safe
11	Salsa / "Let There Be Love"; Showdance / "Wildest Dreams (R3hab remix)"	9; 9	10; 10	9; 9	10; 10	38; 38	Runners-up

Series 9 – with celebrity partner Stephanie Kelly
