= Vitali Kozmin =

Estonian dancer and choreographer

- Born: 14 June 1986 (age 39); Tallinn, then part of Estonian SSR, Soviet Union
- Occupations: Dancer; Choreographer
- Known for: Dancing with the Stars (Irish series)
- Partner: Valeria Milova
- Children: 3

Vitali Kozmin (born 14 June 1986) is an Estonian dancer and choreographer. He is best known for his role as a professional dancer on Irish and Turkish versions of Dancing with the Stars.

== Career ==
Kozmin has represented his country at the World and European Latin-American Championships. He has also been a finalist in the IDSF Amateur European Union Latin Championship and WDSF World Showdance Latin Championship in 2015.

In 2015, Kozmin joined the Burn the Floor cruise tour.

In 2019, Kozmin performed as a cast member of Heartbeat of Home, a live dance show produced by the producers of Riverdance. The show ran at the Piccadilly Theatre in the West End, London. Kozmin also served as choreographer for two numbers in the production.

Kozmin co-created and choreographed the ballroom dance stage production Ballroom Theatre together with dancer and choreographer Valeria Milova.

== Dancing with the Stars ==
=== Turkey (Yok Böyle Dans) ===
In 2011, Kozmin was announced as one of the professional dancers for Yok Böyle Dans, the Turkish version of Dancing with the Stars. Kozmin was paired with fashion designer, Eda Taşpınar. They reached the final of the competition finishing in third place.

In 2012, Kozmin returned for the second and final, season of Yok Böyle Dans. He was paired with model and beauty queen, Özge Ulusoy. Kozmin and Ulusoy won the competition.

Series	Partner	Place
1	Eda Taşpınar	3rd
2	Özge Ulusoy	1st

=== Ireland ===
In 2017, Kozmin was announced as one of the professional dancers for the first series of Dancing with the Stars. He was partnered with actress, Aoibhín Garrihy. On the 26 March 2017, Garrihy and Kozmin reached the final of the competition, they finished as joint runners-up, alongside Denise McCormack and Ryan McShane losing to Kerry footballer, Aidan O'Mahony and, Kozmin's wife, Valeria Milova.

In 2018, Kozmin was partnered with model, Alannah Beirne. They reached the ninth week of the competition, finishing in sixth place.

In 2019, Kozmin was partnered with Fair City actress, Clelia Murphy. They reached the quarterfinals of the competition, finishing in fifth place.

Series	Partner	Place
1	Aoibhín Garrihy	2nd
2	Alannah Beirne	6th
3	Clelia Murphy	5th

Highest and Lowest Scoring Per Dance

Dance	Partner	Highest	Partner	Lowest
American Smooth	Alannah Beirne; Deirdre O'Kane^{1}	26		
Cha-cha-cha	Alannah Beirne; Clelia Murphy	23	Aoibhín Garrihy	21
Charleston	Aoibhín Garrihy	30	Alannah Beirne; Clelia Murphy	26
Contemporary Ballroom	Aoibhín Garrihy	30		
Foxtrot				
Jive	Aoibhín Garrihy	30	Clelia Murphy	19
Paso Doble	Aoibhín Garrihy	26	Katherine Lynch^{1}	21
Quickstep	Alannah Beirne	26	Aoibhín Garrihy	21
Rumba	Aoibhín Garrihy	29	Alannah Beirne	22
Salsa	Aoibhín Garrihy	29	Clelia Murphy	26
Samba	Cliona Hagan^{1}	28	Alannah Beirne	24
Showdance	Aoibhín Garrihy	30		
Tango	Aoibhín Garrihy	25	Clelia Murphy	21
Viennese Waltz	Aoibhín Garrihy	25	Clelia Murphy	21
Waltz	Alannah Beirne	20	Clelia Murphy	19

^{1} These scores was awarded during Switch-Up Week.

==== Series 1 ====
Celebrity partner
Aoibhín Garrihy; Average: 27; Place: 2nd

Week No.	Dance/Song	Judges' score			Total	Result
Week No.	Dance/Song	Redmond	Barry	Benson	Total	Result
1	No dance performed	-	-	-	-	No elimination
2	Cha-cha-cha / "Want to Want Me"	7	7	7	21	No elimination
3	Quickstep / "Crazy Stupid Love"	7	7	7	21	Safe
4	Rumba / "Falling Slowly"	8	9	9	26	Safe
5	Viennese Waltz / "Dangerous Woman"	8	9	8	25	Safe
6	Jive / "Dead Ringer for Love"	9	10	9	28	Safe
7	Paso Doble / "O Fortuna"	7	7	7	21	No elimination Switch-Up Week with Katherine Lynch
8	Paso Doble / "Spectrum (Say My Name)"	9	8	9	26	Safe
9	Salsa / "Crazy in Love"	9	10	10	29	Safe
10	Tango / "Objection (Tango)"; The Ballroom Blitz / "The Ballroom Blitz"	8 Awarded	8; 4	9 Points	25; 29	Bottom two
11	Contemporary Ballroom / "Nothing Compares 2 U"; Charleston / "Do Your Thing"	10; 10	10; 10	10; 10	30; 30	Safe
12	Jive / "Dead Ringer for Love"; Rumba / "Falling Slowly"; Showdance / "Chandelier"	10; 9; 10	10; 10; 10	10; 10; 10	30; 29; 30	Runners-up

==== Series 2 ====
Celebrity partner
Alannah Beirne; Average: 24.9; Place: 6th

Week No.	Dance/Song	Judges' score			Total	Result
Week No.	Dance/Song	Redmond	Barry	Benson	Total	Result
1	No dance performed	-	-	-	-	No elimination
2	Waltz / "Moon River"	6	7	7	20	No elimination
3	Charleston / "Emergency"	8	9	9	26	Safe
4	American Smooth / "City of Stars"	8	9	9	26	Safe
5	Cha-cha-cha / "Timber"	8	7	8	23	Safe
6	American Smooth / "Wuthering Heights"	8	9	9	26	No elimination Switch-Up Week with Deirdre O'Kane
7	Rumba / "Havana"	7	7	8	22	Safe
8	Quickstep / "I'll Be There for You"	8	9	9	26	Bottom two
9	Samba / "Lush Life"; Team Dance / "On the Floor"	8; 10	8; 10	8; 10	24; 30	Eliminated

==== Series 3 ====
Celebrity partner
Clelia Murphy; Average: 22.7; Place: 5th

Week No.	Dance/Song	Judges' score			Total	Result
Week No.	Dance/Song	Redmond	Barry	Benson	Total	Result
1	No dance performed	-	-	-	-	No elimination
2	Jive / "Tell Her About It"	5	7	7	19	No elimination
3	Tango / "Verano Porteño"	7	7	7	21	Safe
4	Salsa / "Night Fever"	8	9	9	26	Safe
5	Viennese Waltz / "The Fair City Waltz"	7	7	7	21	Safe
6	Samba / "Taki Taki"	9	9	10	28	No elimination Switch-Up Week with Cliona Hagan
7	Cha-cha-cha / "She's a Lady"	7	8	8	23	Safe
8	Paso Doble / "Funiculì, Funiculà"	8	8	9	25	Bottom two
9	Charleston / "I Got Rhythm"; Team Dance / "All That Jazz (Castro Remix)"	8; 9	9; 10	9; 10	26; 29	Bottom two
9	Waltz / "All Kinds of Everything"; Eurothon / "Making Your Mind Up"	6 Awarded	6; 1	7 Point	19; 20	Eliminated

== Personal life ==
Kozmin is married to dancer and fellow-Dancing with the Stars cast member, Valeria Milova. They have a two children together.
