= Dancing with the Stars (Irish TV series) =

- Genre: Reality competition
- Created by: Fenia Vardanis; Richard Hopkins; Karen Smith
- Presented by: Amanda Byram; Nicky Byrne; Jennifer Zamparelli; Doireann Garrihy; Laura Fox
- Judges: Loraine Barry; Brian Redmond; Julian Benson; Arthur Gourounlian; Karen Byrne; Oti Mabuse
- Voices of: Jack Boylan
- Country of origin: Ireland
- Original language: English
- No. of series: 9
- No. of episodes: 103

Production
- Production location: Ardmore Studios
- Running time: 120 minutes (inc. adverts)
- Production company: ShinAwil

Original release
- Network: RTÉ One
- Release: 8 January 2017 – present

Related
- Strictly Come Dancing; Dancing with the Stars (franchise)

Dancing with the Stars is an Irish reality television series, airing on RTÉ One, that started on 8 January 2017. It is currently hosted by Jennifer Zamparelli and Laura Fox, who is standing in for Doireann Garrihy while she is on maternity leave. The show is based on the original British version, Strictly Come Dancing, and is part of the Dancing with the Stars franchise. The judging panel currently consists of Arthur Gourounlian, Oti Mabuse, Karen Byrne and Brian Redmond.

== Production ==
In August 2016, it was confirmed that RTÉ One would broadcast an Irish version of Dancing with the Stars, which would replace the successful The Voice of Ireland, which was cancelled in order for the broadcaster to order the new show. A producer of the show commented, "We've got fantastic production people in Ireland who, I believe, deliver a show that's comparable with any of those shows on a fraction of the budget. So we're looking forward to the task of doing this equally the same way."

It became quickly apparent that the 6,525 sq ft (606.2 m^{2}) television studios at RTÉ Television Centre in Dublin were too small for the large scale production of Dancing with the Stars. Therefore, the production has been based in Ardmore Studios in County Wicklow, whose largest studio is 15,000 sq ft (1,400 m^{2}).

== Format ==
The format of the series follows celebrities being paired up with professional dancers, who perform predetermined dances each week for judges' scores and public votes, with the couple with the lowest number of points being eliminated, until the winning couple remains.

=== Judges and hosts ===
Series	Host		Judges			
Series	Host		1	2	3	4
1	Amanda Byram	Nicky Byrne	Brian Redmond	Loraine Barry	Julian Benson	N/A
2	Amanda Byram	Nicky Byrne	Brian Redmond	Loraine Barry	Julian Benson	N/A
3	Jennifer Zamparelli	Nicky Byrne	Brian Redmond	Loraine Barry	Julian Benson	N/A
4	Jennifer Zamparelli	Nicky Byrne	Brian Redmond	Loraine Barry	Julian Benson	N/A
5	Jennifer Zamparelli	Nicky Byrne	Brian Redmond	Loraine Barry	Arthur Gourounlian	N/A
6	Jennifer Zamparelli	Doireann Garrihy	Brian Redmond	Loraine Barry	Arthur Gourounlian	N/A
7	Jennifer Zamparelli	Doireann Garrihy	Brian Redmond	Loraine Barry	Arthur Gourounlian	N/A
8	Jennifer Zamparelli	Doireann Garrihy	Brian Redmond	Loraine Barry	Arthur Gourounlian	Karen Byrne
9	Jennifer Zamparelli	Laura Fox	Brian Redmond	Oti Mabuse	Arthur Gourounlian	Karen Byrne
10	Jennifer Zamparelli	Doireann Garrihy	Brian Redmond	Oti Mabuse	Arthur Gourounlian	Karen Byrne

On 18 December 2016, RTÉ confirmed that Julian Benson, Loraine Barry and Brian Redmond would be the judges on the programme. The show's creative director, Darren Bennett, stood in for Benson at various points throughout Benson's time on the show when he was absent due to illness.

People in the running to be host of the show included former Westlife musician and 2012 Strictly Come Dancing contestant Nicky Byrne; as well as popular radio host Ray D'Arcy, though D'Arcy ruled himself out of the running in August 2016. In October 2016, it was reported that Marty Whelan had auditioned to host the show. In November, it was reported that Amanda Byram had been selected as one of the hosts. In December, it was confirmed that Byrne would host alongside Byram. It was also confirmed that Bláthnaid Treacy would be hosting RTÉ Two spin-off show, Can't Stop Dancing, airing on Friday nights before the live shows.

On 28 August 2018, after two series, Amanda Byram confirmed that she would not be returning as a presenter in 2019. On 30 October 2018, Jennifer Zamparelli was confirmed as Byram's replacement.

On 12 November 2021, it was announced that the series would return after one-year hiatus following the COVID-19 pandemic. Hosts, Zamaparelli and Byrne were slated to return alongside judges, Barry and Redmond. Julian Benson would not return for the fifth series, being replaced by choreographer and creative director, Arthur Gourounlian.

On 25 August 2022, Nicky Byrne announced that he would be stepping away from hosting duties after five seasons to focus on Westlife touring commitments. On 7 October 2022, it was announced that Doireann Garrihy would take over from Byrne as co-host for the sixth season alongside Zamparelli.

On 8 December 2024, it was announced that two-time champion, and the series' only professional dancer to take part in all of the previous seven seasons, Karen Byrne would join the judging panel. Season 8 would, therefore, become the first edition to feature four judges rather than its usual three.

On 25 September 2025, it was announced that after eight series as head judge, Loraine Barry would be leaving the show. On 1 October 2025, it was announced that former Strictly Come Dancing professional dancer, Oti Mabuse would take over as judge for the ninth season. RTÉ 2fm presenter and Season 7 finalist, Laura Fox was announced as co-host for the season, filling in for Doireann Garrihy while she takes maternity leave.

On 26 August 2026, it was confirmed that the series would return for a tenth season in January 2027 with Zamparelli returning as host for her eighth season and Garrihy returning for her fourth having taken the previous season off for maternity leave. No changes to the judging line-up were noted.

=== Professional dancers and their partners ===
Professional dancers	Series 1	Series 2	Series 3	Series 4	Series 5	Series 6	Series 7	Series 8	Series 9
Kylee Vincent	—N/a			Fr. Ray Kelly	Neil Delamere	Damian McGinty	Davy Russell	—N/a	Michael Fry
Laura Nolan	—N/a			Brian Dowling	Matthew MacNabb	Kevin McGahern	Shane Quigley Murphy	Rhys McClenaghan	Paudie Moloney
Stephen Vincent	—N/a			Yewande Biala	Ellen Keane	Dr. Marie Cassidy	Rosanna Davison	Gearóid Farrelly	Niamh Kavanagh
Ervinas Merfeldas	—N/a				Missy Keating	Stephanie Roche	Katja Mia	Kayleigh Trappe	Stephanie Kelly
Alex Vladimirov	—N/a							Jack Woolley	Amber Wilson
Daniela Roze	—N/a							Mickey Joe Harte	Philip Doyle
Maciej Zieba	—N/a							Joanna Donnelly	Tolü Makay
Rebecca Scott	—N/a							Kevin Dundon	Jordan Dargan
Arianna Favaro	—N/a								Eric Roberts
James Cutler	—N/a								Brian Kennedy
Leonardo Lini	—N/a								Katelyn Cummins
Former professional dancers
Robert Rowiński	—N/a	Maïa Dunphy	Cliona Hagan	Glenda Gilson	—N/a	Brooke Scullion	Eileen Dunne	Aishah Akorede	Anne Cassin
Denys Samson	—N/a				Erica-Cody	Panti Bliss	Laura Fox	Elaine Crowley	—N/a
Salome Chachua	—N/a				Jordan Conroy	Paul Brogan	David Whelan	Danny O'Carroll	—N/a
Simone Arena	—N/a						Blu Hydrangea	Yasmin Seky	—N/a
Karen Byrne	Des Cahill	Jake Carter	Darren Kennedy	Michael Carruth	Nicolas Roche	Shane Byrne	Jason Smyth	—N/a	
Jillian Bromwich	—N/a						Rory Cowan	—N/a	
Montel Hewson	—N/a						Miriam Mullins	—N/a	
Michael Danilczuk	—N/a					Suzanne Jackson	—N/a		
John Nolan	Teresa Mannion	Deirdre O'Kane	Mairéad Ronan	Mary Kennedy	Gráinne Seoige	Leah O'Rourke	—N/a		
Emily Barker	Hughie Maughan	Rob Heffernan	Johnny Ward	Aidan Fogarty	Aengus Mac Grianna	Carl Mullan	—N/a		
Maurizio Benenato	—N/a				Cathy Kelly	—N/a			
Hannah Kelly	—N/a				Billy McGuinness	—N/a			
Pasquale La Rocca	—N/a			Lottie Ryan	Nina Carberry	—N/a			
Giulia Dotta	Des Bishop	Tomás O'Leary	Fred Cooke	Ryan Andrews	—N/a				
Kai Widdrington	Katherine Lynch	Anna Geary	Demi Isaac Oviawe	Gráinne Gallanagh	—N/a				
Ryan McShane	Denise McCormack	Erin McGregor	Eilish O'Carroll	Sinéad O'Carroll	—N/a				
Ksenia Zsikhotska	Dayl Cronin	Marty Morrissey	Peter Stringer	—N/a					
Trent Whiddon	—N/a		Holly Carpenter	—N/a					
Valeria Milova	Aidan O'Mahony	Bernard O'Shea	Denis Bastick	—N/a					
Vitali Kozmin	Aoibhín Garrihy	Alannah Beirne	Clelia Murphy	—N/a					
Curtis Pritchard	Thalia Heffernan	Norah Casey	—N/a						
Sean Smullen	Dr. Eva Orsmond	—N/a							

Key:

Winner of the series
Finalist (2nd/3rd/4th place)
First elimination of the series
Participating in current series

Notes

- Week 7 of Series 1 and Week 6 of Series 2, 3 and 4 was 'Switch-Up Week' in which the celebrities danced with different pros for one week only. The table above reflects this as it excludes each pro's regular celebrity partner's Switch-Up Week score and includes their Switch-Up Week partner's score.
- Series 5 saw Ervinas Merfeldas step in for Denys Samson and Stephen Vincent for Weeks 9 and 10 respectively, and Emily Barker step in for Salome Chachua in Week 10, due to illness. The scores are reflected in the tables above and added to the stand-in professionals totals.
- Series 6 saw Maurizio Benenato originally partner, Brooke Scullion. However, in the third week of the competition, Benenato left due to unforeseen circumstances and was replaced with Robert Rowiński. The scores are reflected in the table above with Benenato accounting for Scullion's first two scores and Rowiński accounting for Week 3's scores onwards.

== Overall highest and lowest scoring performances ==
The best and worst performances over each series in each dance according to the judges' scale are as follows. Team Dances and Marathons are not on this list.

Dance	Celebrity	Highest score	Celebrity	Lowest score
Tango	Denise McCormack	30	Bernard O'Shea	10
Cha-cha-cha	Lottie Ryan; Erica-Cody; Brooke Scullion	30	Fr. Ray Kelly	6
Salsa	Dayl Cronin; Denise McCormack; Anna Geary; David Whelan Jack Woolley	30	Dr. Eva Orsmond; Billy McGuinness; Rory Cowan	13
Foxtrot	Aoibhín Garrihy; Johnny Ward	28	Fr. Ray Kelly	8
Charleston	Denise McCormack; Aoibhín Garrihy; Anna Geary; Jake Carter; Ryan Andrews; Gráinne Gallanagh; Nina Carberry; Ellen Keane; Erica-Cody; Laura Fox; Blu Hydrangea; Rhys McClenaghan; Tolü Makay; Katelyn Cummins; Eric Roberts	30	Rory Cowan	11
Waltz	Cliona Hagan	30	Aengus Mac Grianna	11
Quickstep	Cliona Hagan; Lottie Ryan; Blu Hydrangea; Eric Roberts	30	Teresa Mannion; Marty Morrissey	12
Jive	Johnny Ward; Laura Fox; David Whelan	30	Kevin Dundon Paudie Moloney	8
Rumba	Suzanne Jackson	30	Gráinne Seoige	13
Paso Doble	Nina Carberry; Ellen Keane; Jordan Conroy; Brooke Scullion; Rhys McClenaghan	30	Fr. Ray Kelly	9
American Smooth	Ryan Andrews; Jack Woolley; Tolü Makay Katelyn Cummins	30	Leah O'Rourke	10
Contemporary Ballroom	Aoibhín Garrihy; Jake Carter; Johnny Ward; Mairéad Ronan; Ryan Andrews; Jordan Conroy; Brooke Scullion; Damian McGinty; Blu Hydrangea; Jack Woolley	30	Billy McGuinness	17
Samba	Suzanne Jackson; Blu Hydrangea	30	Kevin Dundon	9
Viennese Waltz	Mairéad Ronan; Gráinne Gallanagh; Nina Carberry; Katelyn Cummins	30	Fr. Ray Kelly	10
Showdance	Aidan O'Mahony; Aoibhín Garrihy; Denise McCormack; Anna Geary; Mairéad Ronan; Jake Carter; Johnny Ward; Cliona Hagan; Jordan Conroy; Carl Mullan; Suzanne Jackson; Damian McGinty; Laura Fox; Jason Smyth; David Whelan; Blu Hydrangea; Jack Woolley; Rhys McClenaghan; Katelyn Cummins; Eric Roberts	30	Paudie Moloney	22

== Ranking of couples ==
This table only counts for single dances scored on a traditional 30-points scale. It does not include the Team Dance or Marathon scores.

Ranking	Season	Place	Celebrity	Professional	Total	Average (/30)
1	1	2	Aoibhín Garrihy	Vitali Kozmin	378	27.00
2	6	2	Brooke Scullion	Robert Rowiński	323	26.91
2	4	1	Lottie Ryan	Pasquale La Rocca	296	26.91
2	4	2	Ryan Andrews	Giulia Dotta	296	26.91
5	1	2	Denise McCormack	Ryan McShane	376	26.86
6	7	2	Blu Hydrangea	Simone Arena	322	26.83
6	7	2	David Whelan	Salome Chachua	322	26.83
8	5	2	Erica-Cody	Denys Samson	316	26.33
9	2	1	Jake Carter	Karen Byrne	365	26.07
10	5	1	Nina Carberry	Pasquale La Rocca	312	26.00
11	5	2	Ellen Keane	Stephen Vincent	311	25.92
12	3	2	Johnny Ward	Emily Barker	362	25.86
13	6	2	Damian McGinty	Kylee Vincent	310	25.83
14	5	2	Jordan Conroy	Salome Chachua	307	25.58
14	6	2	Suzanne Jackson	Michael Danilczuk	307	25.58
14	7	2	Laura Fox	Denys Samson	307	25.58
17	1	4	Dayl Cronin	Ksenia Zsikhotska	281	25.55
18	2	2	Anna Geary	Kai Widdrington	355	25.36
19	3	1	Mairéad Ronan	John Nolan	354	25.26
19	3	2	Cliona Hagan	Robert Rowiński	354	25.26
21	2	4	Erin McGregor	Ryan McShane	271	24.64
22	7	6	Katja Mia	Ervinas Merfeldas	220	24.44
23	2	6	Alannah Beirne	Vitali Kozmin	194	24.25
24	4	2	Gráinne Gallanagh	Kai Widdrington	263	23.91
25	6	6	Panti Bliss	Denys Samson	215	23.89
26	2	2	Deirdre O'Kane	John Nolan	333	23.79
27	6	1	Carl Mullan	Emily Barker	284	23.67
28	4	7	Sinéad O'Carroll	Ryan McShane	163	23.29
29	4	2	Aidan Fogarty	Emily Barker	251	22.82
30	3	5	Clelia Murphy	Vitali Kozmin	204	22.67
31	7	7	Rosanna Davison	Stephen Vincent	180	22.50
32	6	5	Kevin McGahern	Laura Nolan	222	22.20
33	7	1	Jason Smyth	Karen Byrne	266	22.17
34	1	8	Des Bishop	Giulia Dotta	110	22.00
35	1	1	Aidan O'Mahony	Valeria Milova	302	21.57
36	5	9	Missy Keating	Ervinas Merfeldas	107	21.40
37	7	5	Davy Russell	Kylee Vincent	207	20.70
38	7	9	Shane Quigley Murphy	Laura Nolan	103	20.60
39	2	5	Rob Heffernan	Emily Barker	179	19.89
40	1	6	Katherine Lynch	Kai Widdrington	158	19.75
40	7	10	Miriam Mullins	Montel Hewson	79	19.75
42	3	6	Denis Bastick	Valeria Milova	157	19.63
43	3	4	Fred Cooke	Giulia Dotta	209	19.00
43	1	10	Thalia Heffernan	Curtis Pritchard	57	19.00
43	5	11	Neil Delamere	Kylee Vincent	57	19.00
46	3	7	Peter Stringer	Ksenia Zsikhotska	130	18.57
47	6	7	Shane Byrne	Karen Byrne	148	18.50
48	6	9	Paul Brogan	Salome Chachua	92	18.40
49	2	10	Tomás O'Leary	Giulia Dotta	55	18.33
50	4	8	Brian Dowling	Laura Nolan	109	18.20
51	5	5	Matthew MacNabb	Laura Nolan	181	18.10
52	8	10	Elaine Crowley	Denys Samson	84^{1}	17.50^{1}
53	6	8	Stephanie Roche	Ervinas Merfeldas	122	17.43
54	5	6	Nicolas Roche	Karen Byrne	139	17.38
55	5	8	Gráinne Seoige	John Nolan	121	17.29
56	2	9	Maïa Dunphy	Robert Rowiński	67	16.75
56	5	7	Billy McGuinness	Hannah Kelly	134	16.75
58	4	10	Glenda Gilson	Robert Rowiński	50	16.70
59	1	5	Des Cahill	Karen Byrne	150	16.67
60	3	9	Darren Kennedy	Karen Byrne	66	16.50
61	4	6	Mary Kennedy	John Nolan	131	16.38
62	7	8	Eileen Dunne	Robert Rowiński	114	16.29
63	1	11	Hughie Maughan	Emily Barker	32	16.00
63	2	11	Norah Casey	Curtis Pritchard	32	16.00
65	8	9	Joanna Donnelly	Maciej Zieba	121^{1}	15.83^{1}
66	6	10	Dr. Marie Cassidy	Stephen Vincent	63	15.75
67	3	8	Demi Isaac Oviawe	Kai Widdrington	94	15.67
67	3	10	Holly Carpenter	Trent Whiddon	94	15.67
69	1	7	Teresa Mannion	John Nolan	108	15.43
70	8	11	Mickey Joe Harte	Daniela Roze	61^{1}	15.25^{1}
71	5	12	Cathy Kelly	Maurizio Benenato	29	14.50
72	1	9	Dr. Eva Orsmond	Sean Smullen	67	14.25
73	2	8	Bernard O'Shea	Valeria Milova	67	14.17
74	4	11	Yewande Biala	Stephen Vincent	28	14.00
75	5	10	Aengus Mac Grianna	Emily Barker	55	13.75
76	3	11	Eilish O'Carroll	Ryan McShane	27	13.50
77	2	7	Marty Morrissey	Ksenia Zsikhotska	93	13.29
78	7	11	Rory Cowan	Jillian Bromwich	38	12.67
79	4	9	Michael Carruth	Karen Byrne	50	12.50
80	6	11	Leah O'Rourke	John Nolan	35	11.67
81	4	5	Fr. Ray Kelly	Kylee Vincent	104	11.56

^{1} Season 8's average scores adjusted to fit the 30-point scale used in the previous seven seasons.

=== Number of perfect scores ===
The scores presented below represent the perfect scores which the celebrities gained in their original season. Perfect scores awarded in Team Dances are not included within this table.

#	Season	Place	Celebrity	Professional
5	7	2nd	Blu Hydrangea	Simone Arena
4	1; 2; 5; 8; 9	2nd 2nd 1st 2nd 1st	Denise McCormack; Anna Geary; Nina Carberry; Jack Woolley; Katelyn Cummins	Ryan McShane; Kai Widdrington; Pasquale La Rocca; Alex Vladimirov; Leonardo Lini
3	1; 2; 3; 3; 3; 4; 5; 6; 6; 7; 7; 8; 9	2nd 1st 1st 2nd 2nd 2nd 2nd 2nd 2nd 2nd 2nd 1st 2nd	Aoibhín Garrihy; Jake Carter; Mairéad Ronan; Johnny Ward; Cliona Hagan; Ryan Andrews; Jordan Conroy; Brooke Scullion; Suzanne Jackson; Laura Fox; David Whelan; Rhys McClenaghan; Eric Roberts	Vitali Kozmin; Karen Byrne; John Nolan; Emily Barker; Robert Rowiński; Giulia Dotta; Salome Chachua; Robert Rowiński; Michael Danilczuk; Denys Samson; Salome Chachua; Laura Nolan; Arianna Favaro
2	4; 4; 5; 5; 6; 9	1st 2nd 2nd 2nd 2nd 2nd	Lottie Ryan; Gráinne Gallanagh; Ellen Keane; Erica-Cody; Damian McGinty; Tolü Makay	Pasquale La Rocca; Kai Widdrington; Stephen Vincent; Denys Samson; Kylee Vincent; Maciej Zieba
1	1; 1; 6; 7	1st 4th 1st 1st	Aidan O'Mahony; Dayl Cronin; Carl Mullan; Jason Smyth	Valeria Milova; Valeria Milova (Note: Dayl Cronin's only perfect score came in Switch-Up Week when he was partnered with Valeria Milova and not his regular partner, Ksenia Zsikhotska.); Emily Barker; Karen Byrne

By Professional:

Number of perfect scores	Professional
6	Pasquale La Rocca; Robert Rowiński; Salome Chachua
5	Kai Widdrington; Denys Samson; Simone Arena
4	Ryan McShane; Emily Barker; Karen Byrne; Alex Vladimirov; Leonardo Lini
3	Vitali Kozmin; John Nolan; Giulia Dotta; Michael Danilczuk; Laura Nolan; Arianna Favaro
2	Valeria Milova; Stephen Vincent; Kylee Vincent; Maciej Zieba

== Series overview ==
Series	Premiere date	Finale date	Number of couples	Number of weeks	Winners	Runners-up
1	8 January 2017	26 March 2017	11	12	Aidan O'Mahony & Valeria Milova	Aoibhín Garrihy & Vitali Kozmin; Denise McCormack & Ryan McShane
2	7 January 2018	25 March 2018	11	12	Jake Carter & Karen Byrne	Anna Geary & Kai Widdrington; Deirdre O'Kane & John Nolan
3	6 January 2019	24 March 2019	11	12	Mairéad Ronan & John Nolan	Johnny Ward & Emily Barker; Cliona Hagan & Robert Rowiński
4	5 January 2020	15 March 2020	11	11	Lottie Ryan & Pasquale La Rocca	Ryan Andrews & Giulia Dotta; Gráinne Gallanagh & Kai Widdrington; Aidan Fogarty & Emily Barker
5	9 January 2022	27 March 2022	12	12	Nina Carberry & Pasquale La Rocca	Jordan Conroy & Salome Chachua; Ellen Keane & Stephen Vincent; Erica-Cody & Denys Samson
6	8 January 2023	19 March 2023	11	11	Carl Mullan & Emily Barker	Brooke Scullion & Robert Rowiński; Damian McGinty & Kylee Vincent; Suzanne Jackson & Michael Danilczuk
7	7 January 2024	17 March 2024	11	11	Jason Smyth & Karen Byrne	Laura Fox & Denys Samson; David Whelan & Salome Chachua; Blu Hydrangea & Simone Arena
8	5 January 2025	16 March 2025	11	11	Rhys McClenaghan & Laura Nolan	Jack Woolley & Alex Vladimirov; Kayleigh Trappe & Ervinas Merfeldas; Danny O'Carroll & Salome Chachua
9	4 January 2026	15 March 2026	12	11	Katelyn Cummins & Leonardo Lini	Eric Roberts & Arianna Favaro; Paudie Moloney & Laura Nolan; Tolü Makay & Maciej Zieba

== Episodes ==
=== Series 1 (2017) ===
The first series of Dancing with the Stars started on 8 January 2017 and finished on 26 March 2017.

=== Series 2 (2018) ===
The second series began on 7 January 2018 and finished on 25 March 2018.

=== Series 3 (2019) ===
The third series began on 6 January 2019 and finished on 24 March 2019.

=== Series 4 (2020) ===
The fourth series began on 5 January 2020 and finished on 15 March 2020 due to the COVID-19 pandemic.

=== Series 5 (2022) ===
The fifth series was postponed in late July 2020 due to the outbreak of the COVID-19 pandemic. The series returned on 9 January 2022 and ended on 27 March 2022.

=== Series 6 (2023) ===
The sixth series began on 8 January 2023 and ended on 19 March 2023.

=== Series 7 (2024) ===
In August 2023, it was confirmed that the series would return for a seventh season in January 2024.

=== Series 8 (2025) ===
The series returned on 5 January 2025 for its eighth series with professional dancer and former winner Karen Byrne joining the judging panel.

=== Series 9 (2026) ===
The series started on 4 January 2026. In September 2025, it was announced that Loraine Barry had stepped down from the judging panel and on 1 October 2025, it was announced that Oti Mabuse would replace her as head judge.

==== Series 10 (2027) ====
The series will return for its tenth series in January 2027.
