= Stephen Vincent (dancer) =

English dancer and choreographer

- Born: 26 May 1989 (age 36); Manchester, England, United Kingdom
- Occupations: Dancer; Choreographer
- Known for: Burn the Floor; Dancing with the Stars (Irish series)
- Height: 1.80 m (5 ft 11 in)
- Spouse: Kylee Vincent (m. 2017)

Stephen Vincent (born 26 May 1989) is an English dancer and choreographer. He is a former UK Latin Champion.

== Early life ==
Vincent was born in Manchester, England. Vincent began dancing at the age of six.

== Amateur dancing career ==
Vincent began his competitive amateur dancing career in 2001 partnering with Bryony Fielding. Vincent and Fielding amassed many titles during their partnership including Junior Latin Champions at the British Closed Championships in Blackpool in 2003. They remained partners until April 2004.

In July 2004, Vincent began dancing competitively with Amanda Couper. They remained partners for a year before calling it a day on their partnership in late 2005. Their year together provided many top five finishes including several first places, including the title of UK Closed Amateur 10 Dance champions in Bournemouth Summer Festival.

== Professional dancing career ==
In 2006, Vincent joined the touring dance company Burn the Floor. He has toured annually with the company all over the world including Australia, South Africa, Asia and North America.

In 2018 and 2019, Vincent joined Strictly Come Dancing professional, Giovanni Pernice as a dancer on his solo tour.

== Dancing with the Stars ==
In November 2019, it was confirmed that Vincent would be joining the cast of the Irish series of Dancing with the Stars as a professional dancer. He partnered Love Island contestant, Yewande Biala. They were the first couple to be eliminated from the competition.

In 2022, Vincent partnered with Irish Paralympic gold medal-winning swimmer, Ellen Keane. They reached the final, finishing as runners-up behind Nina Carberry & Pasquale La Rocca, alongside Jordan Conroy & Salome Chachua and Erica-Cody & Denys Samson.

In 2023, Vincent partnered with former state pathologist, Dr. Marie Cassidy. They were the second couple to be eliminated from the competition.

In 2024, Vincent partnered with author and Miss World 2003, Rosanna Davison. They were the fifth couple to be eliminated from the competition after losing their dance-off to Katja Mia & Ervinas Merfeldas.

In 2025, Vincent partnered with stand-up comedian and podcaster, Gearóid Farrelly. They were the fifth couple to be eliminated from the competition after losing their dance-off to Danny O'Carroll & Salome Chachua.

In 2026, Vincent partnered with singer and Eurovision winner, Niamh Kavanagh.

Series	Partner	Place
4	Yewande Biala	11th
5	Ellen Keane	2nd
6	Dr. Marie Cassidy	10th
7	Rosanna Davison	7th
8	Gearóid Farrelly	7th
9	Niamh Kavanagh	8th

Highest and Lowest Scoring Per Dance

Dance	Partner	Highest	Partner	Lowest
American Smooth	Gearóid Farrelly	22		
Cha-cha-cha	Ellen Keane; Gearóid Farrelly	21		
Charleston	Ellen Keane	30	Gearóid Farrelly	25
Contemporary Ballroom	Ellen Keane	27	Gearóid Farrelly	23
Foxtrot	Ellen Keane	23	Dr. Marie Cassidy	15
Jive	Ellen Keane	27	Dr. Marie Cassidy	15
Paso Doble	Ellen Keane	30	Gearóid Farrelly	21
Quickstep	Ellen Keane	27	Rosanna Davison	20
Rumba	Rosanna Davison	26		
Salsa	Ellen Keane	26	Yewande Biala	16
Samba	Ellen Keane	22		
Showdance	Ellen Keane	29		
Tango	Ellen Keane; Gearóid Farrelly	21	Dr. Marie Cassidy	16
Viennese Waltz	Gearóid Farrelly	22	Yewande Biala	12
Waltz	Rosanna Davison	17		

=== Performances with Yewande Biala ===
Week No.	Dance/Song	Judges' score			Total	Result
Week No.	Dance/Song	Redmond	Barry	Benson	Total	Result
1	No dance performed	-	-	-	-	No elimination
2	Salsa / "Solo Dance"	5	5	6	16	No elimination
3	Viennese Waltz / "Lover"	3	4	5	12	Eliminated

=== Performances with Ellen Keane ===
Week No.	Dance/Song	Judges' score			Total	Result
Week No.	Dance/Song	Redmond	Barry	Gourounlian	Total	Result
1	No dance performed	-	-	-	-	No elimination
2	Tango / "Golden"	7	7	7	21	No elimination
3	Cha-cha-cha / "Get Out My Head"	7	7	7	21	Safe
4	Samba / "Under the Sea"	7	7	8	22	Safe
5	Contemporary Ballroom / "We Are Beautiful"	9	9	9	27	Safe
6	Paso Doble / "Run the World (Girls)"	9	9	10	28	No elimination
7	Foxtrot / "Love Story (Taylor's Version)"	7	8	8	23	Safe
8	Jive / "Candyman"	9	9	9	27	Safe
9	Quickstep / "Walking on Sunshine"	9	9	9	27	Safe
10^{1}	Salsa / "Left My Heart in Tokyo"; Team Dance / "Cuba"	8; 9	9; 9	9; 9	26; 27	Bottom two
11	Charleston / "Marvellous Party"; Bust-a-Move Marathon / "I'm So Excited"	10; Awarded	10; 2	10 points	30; 32	Safe
12	Paso Doble / "Run the World (Girls)"; Showdance / "I See Stars"	10; 9	10; 10	10; 10	30; 29	Runners-up

^{1}In week 10, Vincent tested positive for COVID-19, so his partner, Ellen Keane danced with Ervinas Merfeldas.

=== Performances with Dr. Marie Cassidy ===
Week No.	Dance/Song	Judges' score			Total	Result
Week No.	Dance/Song	Redmond	Barry	Gourounlian	Total	Result
1	Jive / "Love Really Hurts Without You"	5	5	5	15	No elimination
2	Tango / "Olé Guapa"	5	5	6	16	No elimination
3	Salsa / "Mama Wanna Mambo"	5	6	6	17	Safe
4	Foxtrot / "Cruella de Vil"	5	5	5	15	Eliminated

=== Performances with Rosanna Davison ===
Week No.	Dance/Song	Judges' score			Total	Result
Week No.	Dance/Song	Redmond	Barry	Gourounlian	Total	Result
1	Waltz / "Come Away with Me"	6	5	6	17	No elimination
2	Salsa / "Hips Don't Lie"	7	8	8	23	No elimination
3	Quickstep / "Things"	6	7	7	20	Safe
4	Contemporary Ballroom / "Just Like Fire"	8	8	8	24	Safe
5	Charleston / "Dr. Wanna Do"	8	9	9	26	Safe
6	Rumba / "Lady in Red"	8	9	9	26	No elimination
7	Tango / "Together in Electric Dreams"	7	7	8	22	Bottom two
8	Paso Doble / "Toreador Song"	7	7	8	22	Eliminated

=== Performances with Gearóid Farrelly ===
Week No.	Dance/Song	Judges' score				Total	Result
Week No.	Dance/Song	Redmond	Byrne	Barry	Gourounlian	Total	Result
1	Tango / "Training Season"	6	7	8	7	28	No elimination
2	Cha-cha-cha / "Disco Inferno"	6	7	7	8	28	No elimination
3	Viennese waltz / "Everybody Hurts"	7	8	7	8	30	Safe
4	American Smooth / "Consider Yourself"	7	7	-	8	22	Safe
5	Paso Doble / "Holding Out for a Hero"	6	7	8	7	28	Safe
6	Contemporary Ballroom / "In Your Eyes"	7	8	8	8	31	Safe
7	Quickstep / "You Can't Hurry Love"	8	8	8	8	32	Safe
8	Charleston / "Crazy in Love"	8	8	9	8	33	Eliminated

== Personal life ==
In May 2017, Vincent married fellow professional dancer, Kylee Vincent. They met while touring on Burn the Floor together. On 16 May 2024, it was revealed they were expecting their first child together. On 31 October 2024, the Vincent's had their first child, a son.
