= Julian Benson =

Australian-born Irish talent agent (1971–2025)

- Born: Julian Benson; 26 February 1971; Adelaide, South Australia, Australia
- Died: 19 April 2025 (aged 54); Dublin, Ireland
- Occupations: Talent agent; dancer; choreographer; Dancing with the Stars judge
- Years active: 1983–2025

Julian Benson (26 February 1971 – 19 April 2025) was an Australian-born Irish talent agent, choreographer who was known for his role as a judge on the RTÉ One series, Dancing with the Stars.

== Early life ==
Julian Benson was born in Adelaide, Australia where he did his formative dance training. He and his family moved to Ireland when Julian was twelve years old.

== Professional dance career ==
Benson studied in University College Dublin obtaining a degree in English, Irish and Psychology, before studying for two years in Paris. He would eventually become the Head of Dance in Trinity College Dublin.

As a choreographer, Benson produced many productions including The Nutcracker with the Scottish Ballet.

== Talent agency ==
Benson ran Julian Benson Management, a talent agency for television presenters and actors. Some of his clients included Boyzone member Mikey Graham, Fair City actors Maclean Burke and Donna Anita Nikolaisen, and television presenter Eoghan McDermott, whom Benson regarded as one of his best friends.

== Media career ==
From 2017 until 2020, Benson was a judge on the Irish version of Dancing with the Stars for RTÉ One alongside Loraine Barry and Brian Redmond. In 2020, Benson left the panel and was replaced by Arthur Gourounlian.

== Personal life and death ==
Benson was diagnosed with cystic fibrosis at the age of two and was given a life expectancy of thirteen years. Benson kept his diagnosis private for over forty years before revealing it in an interview with Ryan Tubridy on The Late Late Show in 2019.

In 2018, Benson launched the Julian Benson CF Foundation, an organisation fighting to help those with cystic fibrosis. On 8 December 2018, the foundation had a charity ball in order to raise funds. It was hosted by Eoghan McDermott and attended by a number of Irish celebrities.

Benson was openly gay. He was a fluent Irish language speaker.

Benson died of complications from cystic fibrosis in Dublin, on 19 April 2025, at the age of 54.
