= Laura Nolan =

Irish dancer and choreographer (born 1994)

- Born: 31 May 1994 (age 32); Dublin, Ireland
- Occupations: Dancer, choreographer
- Known for: Dancing with the Stars (Irish series)

Laura Nolan (born 31 May 1994) is an Irish ballroom dancer and choreographer. She is best known as a professional dancer on the Irish version of Dancing with the Stars, having danced on the show since 2020.

== Early life ==
Nolan was born in Lucan in Dublin. She is trained in ballroom, latin, and ballet dancing.

== Professional career ==
Nolan first began dancing competitively at the age of five. She competed in the All Ireland Championships in June 2006 with her first partner, Luca Mastropietro. The couple reached the quarterfinals of their first championship.

From 2009 to 2013, Nolan danced with English dancer, Stanislav Wakeham.

From 2015 to 2019, Nolan danced with Italian dancer, Alessandro Bosco. In 2018 they finished in first place in the World Open Adult Standard at the Bacau Dance Open tournament.

Nolan was a finalist in the Under 21 World Championship, placing amongst the top ten in the world. In 2018, she and Bosco ranked fifth in the World Open. Nolan has won numerous International Open championships and was a finalist in the German Open. Making her the first Irish dancer to compete in the World Championships.

In 2019, the couple announced their retirement from ballroom dancing.

== Media career ==
In 2020, Nolan was crowned Miss Universe Leinster. She went on to take part in the Miss Universe Ireland competition where she reached the top three.

In 2021, Nolan appeared as a contestant in the celebrity version of the RTÉ programme, Hell Week.

== Dancing with the Stars ==
In November 2019, it was confirmed that Nolan would be joining the cast of the Irish series of Dancing with the Stars as a professional dancer. She was paired with television presenter and Big Brother winner, Brian Dowling. They were eliminated in the seventh week of the competition.

In 2022, Nolan partnered former Love Island contestant, Matthew MacNabb. Despite receiving some of the lowest scores from the judges throughout their time on the show, Nolan and MacNabb reached the semi-final of the competition, finishing in fifth place.

In 2023, Nolan partnered comedian, Kevin McGahern. Nolan once again reached the semi-final of the competition with McGahern and finished in fifth place, following their dance-off against Suzanne Jackson and Michael Danilczuk.

In 2024, Nolan partnered Fair City actor, Shane Quigley Murphy. They were the third couple to be eliminated from the competition. Nolan also partnered former jockey Davy Russell in week two when Russell's usual partner, Kylee Vincent, was ill, meaning she performed two dances on that particular edition of the show.

In 2025, Nolan partnered Olympic artistic gymnast, Rhys McClenaghan and they won the competition on 16th March 2025.

In 2026, Nolan partnered The Traitors star, Paudie Moloney.

Series	Partner	Place
4	Brian Dowling	8th
5	Matthew MacNabb	5th
6	Kevin McGahern	5th
7	Shane Quigley Murphy	9th
8	Rhys McClenaghan	1st
9	Paudie Moloney	2nd

Highest and Lowest Scoring Per Dance

Dance	Partner	Highest	Partner	Lowest
American Smooth	Rhys McClenaghan	29	Brian Dowling	20
Cha-cha-cha	Rhys McClenaghan	22	Matthew MacNabb	12
Charleston	Rhys McClenaghan	30	Brian Dowling	18
Contemporary Ballroom	Rhys McClenaghan	29	Matthew MacNabb	26
Foxtrot	Kevin McGahern	24	Matthew MacNabb	17
Jive	Rhys McClenaghan	25	Matthew MacNabb	11
Paso Doble	Rhys McClenaghan	30	Matthew MacNabb	22
Quickstep	Rhys McClenaghan	29	Shane Quigley Murphy	21
Rumba	Rhys McClenaghan	23	Shane Quigley Murphy	19
Salsa	Kevin McGahern; Rhys McClenaghan	23	Matthew MacNabb	14
Samba	Matthew MacNabb	21		
Showdance	Rhys McClenaghan	30		
Tango	Rhys McClenaghan	24	Brian Dowling	15
Viennese Waltz	Kevin McGahern	19	Matthew MacNabb	13
Waltz	Ryan Andrews^{1}	25	Shane Quigley Murphy	20

^{1} This score was awarded during Switch-Up Week.

=== Performances with Brian Dowling ===
Week No.	Dance/Song	Judges' score			Total	Result
Week No.	Dance/Song	Redmond	Barry	Benson	Total	Result
1	Salsa / "Juice"	5	5	6	16	No elimination
2	No dance performed	-	-	-	-	No elimination
3	American Smooth / "Dance Monkey"	6	7	7	20	Safe
4	Charleston / "Fat Sam's Grand Slam"	6	6	6	18	Safe
5	Cha-Cha-Cha / "We Are Family"	5	6	6	17	Safe
6	Waltz / "Open Arms"	8	8	9	25	No elimination Switch-Up Week with Ryan Andrews
7	Tango / "When Doves Cry"	5	5	5	15	Eliminated

=== Performances with Matthew MacNabb ===
Week No.	Dance/Song	Judges' score			Total	Result
Week No.	Dance/Song	Redmond	Barry	Gourounlian	Total	Result
1	No dance performed	-	-	-	-	No elimination
2	Viennese Waltz / "Dangerously"	3	5	5	13	No elimination
3	Jive / "Overpass Graffiti"	3	4	4	11	Safe
4	Foxtrot / "You've Got a Friend in Me"	5	6	6	17	Safe
5	Salsa / "X"	4	5	5	14	Safe
6	Contemporary Ballroom / "See You Again"	8	9	9	26	No elimination Granted immunity
7	Cha-cha-cha / "Dynamite"	4	4	4	12	Immune
8	Paso Doble / "Live and Let Die"	7	7	8	22	Safe
9	American Smooth / "Anyone for You"	7	7	8	22	Safe
10	Tango / "Rio"; Team Dance / "Istanbul (Not Constantinople)"	7; 9	8; 10	8; 10	23; 29	Safe
11	Samba / "One Dance"; Bust-a-Move Marathon / "I'm So Excited"	7 Awarded	7; 1	7 point	21; 22	Eliminated

=== Performances with Kevin McGahern ===
Week No.	Dance/Song	Judges' score			Total	Result
Week No.	Dance/Song	Redmond	Barry	Gourounlian	Total	Result
1	Viennese Waltz / "You Know Me"	6	6	7	19	No elimination
2	Jive / "Reet Petite"	7	7	7	21	No elimination
3	Tango / "I Don't Like Mondays"	5	6	6	17	Safe
4	American Smooth / "Pure Imagination"	7	7	7	21	Safe
5	Cha-cha-cha / "Canned Heat"	6	7	7	20	Safe
6	Paso Doble / "Smells Like Teen Spirit"	8	8	8	24	No elimination
7	Quickstep / "Lust for Life"	8	9	9	26	Safe
8	Foxtrot / "Rocket Man"	8	8	8	24	Safe
9	Salsa / "Stay with Me"; Team Freestyle / "Crying at the Discoteque"	7; 8	8; 10	8; 10	23; 28	Safe
10	Charleston / "Cotton-Eyed Joe"; Marathon / "I Want Candy"	9 Awarded	9; 1	9 Point	27; 28	Eliminated

=== Performances with Shane Quigley Murphy ===
Week No.	Dance/Song	Judges' score			Total	Result
Week No.	Dance/Song	Redmond	Barry	Gourounlian	Total	Result
1	Salsa / "Where Did You Go?"	6	6	7	19	No elimination
2	Waltz / "At This Moment"	6	7	7	20	No elimination
3	Jive / "All These Nights"	8	8	8	24	Safe
4	Quickstep / "Mr. Blue Sky"	7	7	7	21	Safe
5	Rumba / "How Will I Know?"	6	6	7	19	Eliminated

=== Performances with Rhys McClenaghan ===
Week No.	Dance/Song	Judges' score				Total	Result
Week No.	Dance/Song	Redmond	Byrne	Barry	Gourounlian	Total	Result
1	Salsa / "Head & Heart"	7	8	8	8	31	No elimination
2	Tango / "Tanguera"	8	8	8	8	32	No elimination
3	Cha-cha-cha / "Treasure"	7	8	7	8	30	Safe
4	Charleston / "Spider-Man"	9	10	-	10	29	Safe
5	Jive / "Gold Dust"	8	8	8	9	33	Safe
6	Quickstep / "Fairytale"	9	10	10	10	39	Safe
7	Rumba / "Love Me like You Do"	7	8	8	8	31	Safe
8	Contemporary Ballroom / "Bittersweet Symphony"	9	10	10	10	39	Safe
9	American Smooth / "Wagon Wheel"; Team Dance / "Timber"	9; 9	10; 10	10; 10	10; 10	39; 39	Safe
10	Paso Doble / "O Fortuna"; Scare-a-thon / "Time Warp"	10; Couple	10 awarded	10; 5	10 points	40; 45	Safe
11	Charleston / "Spider-Man"; Showdance / "Beautiful Things"	10; 10	10; 10	10; 10	10; 10	40; 40	Winners

== Personal life ==
In March 2022, Nolan confirmed that she was in a relationship with her Series 5 celebrity partner, Matthew MacNabb, following their elimination from the show. The couple got engaged on 9 November 2024.
