= Kylee Vincent =

South African dancer and choreographer

- Born: 15 July 1994 (age 31); Pretoria, South Africa
- Occupations: Dancer; Choreographer
- Known for: Burn the Floor; Dancing with the Stars (Irish series)
- Height: 1.63 m (5 ft 4 in)
- Spouse: Stephen Vincent (m. 2017)

Kylee Vincent (born 15 July 1994; née Brown) is a South African dancer and choreographer. She is a former UK Latin Champion.

== Early life ==
Vincent was born in Pretoria, South Africa. Vincent began dancing at the age of eight.

== Career ==
Vincent is a WDC South Africa Under 21 Latin Champion. In 2011, she won the Under 21 WDC World Latin Championships. In 2012, she was the Under 21 Open British Latin Championship in Blackpool in 2012.

In 2013, Vincent joined the touring dance company Burn the Floor. She has toured the world with the company every year since.

In 2018 and 2019, Vincent joined Strictly Come Dancing professional, Giovanni Pernice as a dancer on his solo tour.

== Dancing with the Stars ==
In November 2019, it was confirmed that Vincent would be joining the cast of the Irish series of Dancing with the Stars as a professional dancer. For her first season, Vincent was paired with singer and priest, Fr. Ray Kelly. Despite consistently being the lowest scoring couple throughout the season, Kelly and Vincent managed to reach Week 10 of the competition, eventually finishing in fifth place.

In 2022, Vincent was paired with comedian, Neil Delamere. They were eliminated in the fourth week of the season, finishing in eleventh place.

In 2023, Vincent was paired with singer and former Glee actor, Damian McGinty. They reached the final, finishing as joint runners-up to Carl Mullan & Emily Barker.

In 2024, Vincent was paired with former jockey, Davy Russell. They were eliminated in the seventh week of the competition, finishing in fifth place. They lost the final dance-off of the series to David Whelan and Salome Chachua.

In 2026, Vincent returned to the series after a one year absence. She was paired with comedian and actor, Michael Fry. They were the first couple to be eliminated.

Series	Partner	Place
4	Fr. Ray Kelly	5th
5	Neil Delamere	11th
6	Damian McGinty	2nd
7	Davy Russell	5th
9	Michael Fry	12th

Highest and Lowest Scoring Per Dance

Dance	Partner	Highest	Partner	Lowest
American Smooth	Davy Russell	20	Fr. Ray Kelly	15
Cha-cha-cha	Davy Russell	21	Fr. Ray Kelly	6
Charleston	Damian McGinty	29	Davy Russell	21
Contemporary Ballroom	Damian McGinty	30	Davy Russell	26
Foxtrot	Damian McGinty	25	Fr. Ray Kelly	8
Jive	Damian McGinty	25	Fr. Ray Kelly	15
Paso Doble	Damian McGinty	28	Fr. Ray Kelly	9
Quickstep	Damian McGinty	22	Fr. Ray Kelly	13
Rumba	Damian McGinty	29		
Salsa	Damian McGinty	21	Fr. Ray Kelly	14
Samba	Michael Fry	16	Davy Russell	12
Showdance	Damian McGinty	30		
Tango	Davy Russell	23	Damian McGinty	21
Viennese Waltz	Davy Russell	27	Fr. Ray Kelly	10
Waltz				

=== Performances with Fr. Ray Kelly ===
Week No.	Dance/Song	Judges' score			Total	Result
Week No.	Dance/Song	Redmond	Barry	Benson	Total	Result
1	Foxtrot / "Spirit in the Sky"	2	2	4	8	No elimination
2	No dance performed	-	-	-	-	No elimination
3	Cha-Cha-Cha / "Save the Last Dance for Me"	1	2	3	6	Safe
4	Paso Doble / "The Magnificent Seven Theme"	2	3	4	9	Safe
5	Viennese Waltz / "Hallelujah"	2	4	4	10	Safe
6	Cha-Cha-Cha / "Feels Like Home"	6	6	6	18	No elimination Switch-Up Week with Aidan Fogarty
7	Jive / "Build Me Up Buttercup"	5	5	5	15	Safe
8	Salsa / "Hot Hot Hot"	4	5	5	14	Safe
9	Quickstep / "I'm a Believer"; Team Dance / "Sing, Sing, Sing (With a Swing)"	4; 9	4; 9	5; 9	13; 27	Safe
10	American Smooth / "Songs of Love"; Rock-Til-You-Drop / "Happy Days"	5 Awarded	5; 1	5 point	15; 16	Eliminated

=== Performances with Neil Delamere ===
Week No.	Dance/Song	Judges' score			Total	Result
Week No.	Dance/Song	Redmond	Barry	Gourounlian	Total	Result
1	Paso Doble / "I Believe in a Thing Called Love"	5	6	6	17	No elimination
2	No dance performed	-	-	-	-	No elimination
3	Charleston / "I Don't Feel Like Dancin'"	6	8	8	22	Safe
4	Cha-cha-cha / "Ghostbusters"	5	7	6	18	Eliminated

=== Performances with Damian McGinty ===
Week No.	Dance/Song	Judges' score			Total	Result
Week No.	Dance/Song	Redmond	Barry	Gourounlian	Total	Result
1	Tango / "Shivers"	7	7	7	21	No elimination
2	Salsa / "Acapulco"	7	7	7	21	No elimination
3	Viennese Waltz / "All for You"	8	8	8	24	Safe
4	Jive / "Burning Love"	8	8	8	24	Safe
5	Quickstep / "She's So Lovely"	7	7	8	22	Safe
6	Contemporary Ballroom / "Forever Young"	9	9	9	27	No elimination
7	Charleston / "No Swinggity"	9	10	10	29	Safe
8	Paso Doble / "Sweet Child o' Mine"	9	9	10	28	Safe
9	Foxtrot / "Don't Let the Light Go Out"; Team Freestyle / "HandClap"	8; 9	8; 9	9; 9	25; 27	Safe
10	Rumba / "Stay"; Marathon / "I Want Candy"	9 Awarded	10; 4	10; Points	29; 33	Safe
11	Contemporary Ballroom / "Forever Young"; Showdance / "Take a Look At Us Now"	10; 10	10; 10	10; 10	30; 30	Runners-up

=== Performances with Davy Russell ===
Week No.	Dance/Song	Judges' score			Total	Result
Week No.	Dance/Song	Redmond	Barry	Gourounlian	Total	Result
1	Paso Doble / "Crazy Horses"	6	6	7	19	No elimination
2^{1}	Quickstep / "Giddy Up!"	5	5	5	15	No elimination
3	Samba / "Iko Iko (My Bestie)"	4	4	4	12	Safe
4	Charleston / "Star Wars Theme/Cantina Band"	7	7	7	21	Safe
5	American Smooth / "Ain't Misbehaving"	6	7	7	20	Safe
6	Contemporary Ballroom / "Roar"	8	9	9	26	No elimination Granted immunity
7	Tango / "Whatever Lola Wants (Gotan Project remix)"	8	7	8	23	Safe
8	Jive / "Everybody Needs Somebody to Love"	7	8	8	23	Safe
9	Cha-cha-cha / "Spicy Margarita"; Team Dance / "Electric Energy"	7; 10	7; 9	7; 9	21; 28	Safe
10	Viennese Waltz / "Never Tear Us Apart"; Scare-a-thon / "Dead Ringer for Love"	9 Awarded	9; 1	9 Point	27; 28	Eliminated

^{1}Vincent did not perform in week 2 due to illness. Russell performed his dance with Laura Nolan instead.

=== Performances with Michael Fry ===
Week No.	Dance/Song	Judges' score				Total	Result
Week No.	Dance/Song	Redmond	Byrne	Mabuse	Gourounlian	Total	Result
1	Quickstep / "Goodbye Mr A"	5	6	5	5	21	No elimination
2	Samba / "Sapphire"	4	6	7	6	23	Eliminated

== Personal life ==
In May 2017, Vincent married fellow professional dancer, Stephen Vincent. They met while touring on Burn the Floor together. On 16 May 2024, it was revealed they were expecting their first child together. On 31 October 2024, Vincent gave birth to their son.
