= The RTÉ 2fm Breakfast Show =

- Other names: 2FM Breakfast
- Genre: Music, chat
- Running time: 180 minutes (6:00 am – 9:00 am)
- Country of origin: Ireland
- Language: English
- Home station: RTÉ 2fm
- Hosted by: Carl Mullan; Roz Purcell; Aisling Bonner
- Recording studio: RTÉ Radio Centre, Donnybrook, Dublin 4
- Original release: 24 February 2025
- Audio format: FM and digital radio
- Website: Official website

The RTÉ 2fm Breakfast Show is the flagship show on RTÉ 2fm. Since 24 February 2025, it has been hosted by Carl Mullan, Roz Purcell and Aisling Bonner under the banner of 2FM Breakfast with Carl, Roz and Aisling.

== History ==
The first breakfast show presenter was Declan Meehan, who remained in the slot for just under five months. Marty Whelan took over from Meehan and has the distinction of hosting the breakfast show on four occasions. Ian Dempsey is the longest-serving breakfast show presenter, having hosted on two occasions for a total of ten years. Breakfast Republic is the second-longest running show, lasting over 5 years, with the majority of its presenters resigning to other shows across RTÉ. Doireann Garrihy and Eoghan McDermott fronted the show in the following two years, until McDermott's resignation in March 2021, whilst Garrihy continued with new hosts Carl Mullan and Donncha O'Callaghan until her resignation in May 2024. Mullan and O'Callaghan continued with new host Aifric O'Connell. However, on 25 June, O'Callaghan announced that he would leave the show from July. Following O'Callaghan's departure Carl Mullan and Afric O'Connell continued to front the show until 2FM announced a new breakfast line-up which saw O'Connell depart the show and Roz Purcell and Aisling Bonner replace her. The new show launched in February 2025 originally running for 3 hours (6-9am) but following a change in the overall schedule of the station, the show was extended by an hour in May 2026 (6-10am). The Show currently averages 121,000 listeners as per latest JNLR results

=== Hosts ===
No	Show title	Presenter	From	To	Duration
1	Declan Meehan's Breakfast Show	Declan Meehan	8 June 1979	2 November 1979	147 days
2	Good Morning with Marty Whelan (Note: The show was later renamed Marty Whelan's Breakfast Show.)	Marty Whelan	5 November 1979	3 October 1980	333 days
3	Ronan Collins's Breakfast Show	Ronan Collins	6 October 1980	31 May 1985	4 years, 237 days
4		Marty Whelan	3 June 1985	9 March 1988	2 years, 280 days
5		Ian Dempsey	14 March 1988	24 March 1989	1 year, 10 days
6		Marty Whelan	27 March 1989	14 April 1989	18 days
7		Ian Dempsey	3 July 1989	12 August 1998	9 years, 40 days
8	Gareth O'Callaghan's Breakfast Show	Gareth O'Callaghan	13 August 1998	7 April 2000	1 year, 238 days
9	Damien McCaul's Breakfast Show	Damien McCaul	10 April 2000	15 March 2002	1 year, 339 days
10	The Full Irish	Ryan Tubridy	18 March 2002	18 March 2005	3 years, 0 days
10	The Rick & Ruth Breakfast Show	Rick O'Shea and Ruth Scott	21 March 2005	23 September 2005	186 days
11	Marty in the Morning	Marty Whelan	26 September 2005	2 March 2007	1 year, 157 days
12	The Colm & Jim-Jim Breakfast Show	Colm Hayes and Jim-Jim Nugent	5 March 2007	7 May 2010	3 years, 63 days
13	Breakfast with Hector	Hector Ó hEochagáin	4 October 2010	20 December 2013	3 years, 77 days
14	Breakfast Republic	Keith Walsh, Bernard O'Shea and Jennifer Maguire	17 February 2014	9 May 2019	5 years, 81 days
15	2FM Breakfast with Doireann and Eoghan	Eoghan McDermott and Doireann Garrihy	31 May 2019	26 February 2021	1 year, 271 days
16	2FM Breakfast with Doireann, Donncha and Carl	Doireann Garrihy, Donncha O'Callaghan and Carl Mullan	31 May 2021	31 May 2024	3 years, 0 days
17	2FM Breakfast with Carl, Donncha and Aifric	Carl Mullan, Donncha O'Callaghan and Aifric O'Connell	4 June 2024	21 February 2025	
18	2FM Breakfast with Carl, Roz & Aisling	Carl Mullan, Roz Purcell and Aisling Bonner	24 February 2025	Present	

== Stand-ins ==
Holiday cover has usually been provided by another prominent member of the RTÉ 2fm presentation team. Additionally, transitions between regular hosts have often been bridged by stand-ins. These have been:

- Following the sudden departure of Marty Whelan to the newly created Century Radio in April 1989, the breakfast show was fronted by Simon Young, Scott Williams and Maxi.
- Paddy McKenna joined Jim-Jim Nugent as a replacement for Colm Hayes in May 2010, when the latter moved to co-host a new show during the former Gerry Ryan Show slot. After the permanent departure of Jim-Jim Nugent in September 2010, Paddy McKenna was joined as co-host of the breakfast show by Ruth Scott.
- Alan Swann covered the period between the axing of Breakfast with Hector and the beginning of Breakfast Republic.
- Stephen Byrne and Tara Stewart filled in for Doireann Garrihy between April and May 2021 while she workshopped a new show following Eoghan McDermott's departure.
- Laura Fox has also filled in as a presenter in 2024.
