= Garrihy sisters =

Irish social media influencers (actress, publicist, presenter)

Aoibhín Garrihy
- Born: 20 June 1987 (age 39); Castleknock, Ireland
- Known for: Irish social media influencer

Ailbhe Garrihy
- Born: 19 April 1990 (age 36); Castleknock, Ireland
- Known for: Irish social media influencer

Doireann Garrihy
- Born: 19 May 1992 (age 34); Castleknock, Ireland
- Agent: Noel Kelly
- Known for: Irish social media influencer

Aoibhín Garrihy, Ailbhe Garrihy and Doireann Garrihy are Irish social media influencers, having played different roles in the entertainment industry. Aoibhín is an actress, having played Neasa Dillon in RTÉ One's Fair City from 2010 to 2013. She was a finalist in the first series of the Irish version of Dancing with the Stars. Ailbhe is a publicist. Doireann is a comedy impressionist, known for two series of The Doireann Project, and radio and television presenter, hosting the revival in 2018 of RTÉ Two's The Podge and Rodge Show.

== Early life ==
The Garrihys came from Castleknock, County Dublin, the daughters of Eugene and Clare. Eugene is now an entrepreneur, the director of ferry companies Dublin Bay Cruises and Doolin2Aran.

== Aoibhín ==
Aoibhín (born 20 June 1987) has acting credits including Fair City, Love/Hate, and Mattie.

In 2017, Garrihy was a contestant in the first series of RTÉ's Dancing with the Stars. On 26 March 2017, she reached the final of the competition with her professional partner, Vitali Kozmin. They finished as runners-up to Aidan O'Mahony and Kozmin's wife, Valeria Milova. In 2018, she was a guest chef on TV3's The Restaurant.

She lives in County Clare with husband, John Burke, and their four daughters, Hanora, Líobhan, Isla, and Aoileann. In November 2025, she announced she was expecting her fourth child, who was born in March 2026.

== Ailbhe ==
Ailbhe (born 19 April 1990) is a graduate of Dublin City University. She now works for the family business, Dublin Bay Cruises. She resides in Meath with her husband and their three sons, Seán, Fionn & Cian.

== Doireann ==
=== Early life and education ===
Doireann (born 19 May 1992) is the god daughter of radio presenter Ian Dempsey. Doireann graduated from Trinity College Dublin with a degree in Drama and Theatre studies.

=== Career ===
She worked as an entertainment reporter on Spin 1038 and provided traffic reports for 2fm with AA Roadwatch. Having amassed a following on social media she was commissioned by RTÉ to make a web series, The Doireann Project, based on her impressions. She has won awards such as 'Most Stylish Influencer' at the VIP Style Awards and U magazine's 30 under 30 'Rising Star'. She began presenting The Podge and Rodge Show in 2018 until 2019. In 2019 she started a podcast called 'The Laughs of Your Life with Doireann Garrihy'. It lasted 4 years and more than 70 guests appeared on it. She hosted a live version of the show in 2023.

In June 2019, Doireann presented the new breakfast show on RTÉ 2fm from 6am to 9am alongside Eoghan McDermott. She continued to present the show with Carl Mullan and Donncha O'Callaghan until May 2024. In October 2022, Garrihy was announced as the new co-host of Dancing with the Stars alongside Jennifer Zamparelli.

Separate from her work with RTÉ, Doireann is a "brand ambassador" for Renault, a deal arranged by her agent, Noel Kelly. As of 2023, her most recent car was a Renault Arkana, retailing at more than €30,000. Doireann began a deal worth thousands of euro to promote Flahavan's in February 2022, when she was paid to post on social media; however, this created problems when, without permission, she used an RTÉ studio to promote Flahavan's products; for a year and half, Doireann refused RTÉ's attempts to take the promotion down, until it was noticed by a newspaper in 2023.

Doireann was paid to chair a Dáil Éireann conference at Dublin Castle on participation in politics; she admitted that she was unaware why she had been asked to do this. In addition to her work with RTÉ and other brands, TD Catherine Murphy stated in Dáil Éireann that the publicly-funded Horse Racing Ireland paid €20,000 to Doireann Garrihy to promote the Cheltenham Festival – "an event in another jurisdiction". RTÉ used boats owned by a Garrihy family business, Dublin Bay Cruises, to host parties.

In May 2024, she announced that she would be leaving her morning radio show on RTÉ 2fm at the end of May after five years. In January 2025, it was announced that she would be returning to RTÉ 2fm in February as the presenter of the new Drive time show on the station. She moved timeslots to host "2FM Mornings with Doireann Garrihy" in May 2026.

=== Personal life ===
On 30 November 2023, Doireann announced her engagement to her boyfriend, Irish comedian Mark Mehigan. They got married in November 2024. They welcomed their first child, a baby girl in October 2025.
