= Burn the Floor =

Theatrical dance show

- Formation: 1997
- Type: Theatre group
- Purpose: Ballroom
- Location: Touring
- Artistic director: Jason Gilkison
- Notable members: Peta Roby
- Website: Official website

Burn the Floor is a live dance show which has performed around the world, including on Broadway in New York City and the West End in London. Since 1997, Burn the Floor has performed in over 130 countries worldwide. The show has also featured several alumni of various international versions of Strictly Come Dancing and So You Think You Can Dance.

== Origin ==
On April 7, 1997, Elton John's 50th birthday party included a 10-minute performance from a group of ballroom dancers. The birthday party is credited with starting the idea for Burn the Floor. Following John's party, Australian producer Harley Medcalf spent two years developing the idea. Medcalf brought a showcase of ballroom dance to an Elton John Aids fundraiser two years later. Among the talent Medcalf recruited for his stage show included a choreographer, Anthony Van Laast, and Australian ballroom dancers Jason Gilkison and Peta Roby. By 2000, the show played a two night stint at Radio City Music Hall in New York City. The New York Times said of the production, "Look past the show's brassy facade, with its rock-show production values and attitude (mock ecstasy is the usual facial expression), and there is some complex footwork in what is essentially a suite of deliberately souped-up social dances."

== Early years ==
In 2001, Jason Gilkison took over the role of choreographer. By 2005, an Australian workshop of the show was named "Jason Gilkison's Ballroom." Through the course of several tours, the production tinkered with what worked. Growing into a large production requiring seven vehicles to move from city to city, the tour's creative team began to realize that they preferred the show more stripped down and focused on the dancers. According to Gilkison, “The goal was to streamline it, make it more theatrical, reinvent it with the help of the dancers, who had their own ideas of how to make it more contemporary."

Before the show hit Broadway, it had already been performed in 29 countries.

== Broadway ==
Burn the Floor performed its first preview show on Broadway on July 25, 2009 at the Longacre Theatre. The show opened on August 2, 2009 after eight preview performances. Maksim Chmerkovskiy and Karina Smirnoff, known for appearing on the U.S. television series Dancing with the Stars, were announced as special guest stars for the first three weeks of performances. At the time, Chmerkovskiy and Smirnoff were a couple off stage as well. Gilkison, who had known Chmerkovskiy since 1990, mentioned to Chmerkovskiy before taking the show to Broadway that he was looking for more female dancers. Chmerkovskiy was a fan of the stage show and suggested he join the cast with Smirnoff.

Following the departure of Chmerkovskiy and Smirnoff, Anya Garnis and Pasha Kovalev, then known for competing on the U.S. version of So You Think You Can Dance, took over the roles of featured dancers. Ticket sales decreased following the departure of Chmerkovskiy and Smirnoff. Shortly after their stint in Burn the Floor, Chmerkovskiy and Smirnoff ended their romantic relationship including their engagement. Chmerkovskiy agreed to return to the show in November 2009, but he stated he would not perform with Smirnoff. Instead, Chmerkovskiy returned partnered with another Dancing with the Stars pro, Kym Johnson.

The broadway run ended on January 10, 2010. The show had made plans to continue into February, however, those plans were scrapped.

=== Broadway cast ===
==== Opening Night ====
The opening night cast including the following dancers:

- Karina Smirnoff
- Maksim Chmerkovskiy
- Sharna Burgess
- Henry Byalikov
- Kevin Clifton
- Sasha Farber
- Jeremy Garner
- Gordana Grandosek
- Patrick Helm
- Sarah Hives
- Melanie Hooper
- Peta Murgatroyd
- Giselle Peacock
- Nuria Santalucia
- Sarah Soriano
- Damon Sugden
- Rebecca Sugden
- Trent Whiddon
- Damian Whitewood
- Robin Windsor

Vocalists:

- Ricky Rojas
- Rebecca Tapia

==== Other cast members ====
Throughout the Broadway run, the following dancers joined the cast:

- Irina Boubnovskai (arrived August 10, 2009)
- Artem Chigvintsev (September 14, 2009 – October 26, 2009; arrived December 21, 2009)
- Anya Garnis (August 18, 2009 – November 23, 2009)
- Karen Hauer (Arrived December 21, 2009)
- Derek Hough (Arrived January 8, 2009)
- Pasha Kovalev (August 17, 2009 – November 23, 2009)
- Mirko Sciolan (Arrived September 14, 2009)
- Vaidotas Skimelis (Arrived December 21, 2009)
- Emma Slater (Arrived October 26, 2009)
- Karina Stumpfova (Arrived on November 23, 2009)
- Gary Wright (November 23, 2009)
- Mig Ayesa (Arrived January 4, 2010)

== West End ==
In 2010, Burn the Floor performed a limited engagement at the Shaftesbury Theatre on London's West End. Featured guest stars for the 2010 run included Ali Bastian, a competitor on Strictly Come Dancing, and her pro partner from Strictly, Brian Fortuna. The show was scheduled to run from July 21-September 5, 2010.

The show returned to the Shaftesbury Theatre in 2013, this time with Robin Windsor and Kristina Rihanoff, pro dancers from Strictly Come Dancing, in the roles of featured guest stars. The 2013 run began on March 6, 2013 and closed on June 30, 2013, although it was originally scheduled to run through September 1.

== World Tours ==
Following closing on Broadway, the show embarked on a 2010 world tour, which included 30 cities in the United States.

A new production, Burn the Floor – Fire in the Ballroom, choreographed and directed by Peta Roby, debuted in 2016 at the Regal Theatre in Perth, Australia. In contrast to previous productions, Fire in the Ballroom incorporated more rock and roll with the intention of appealing more the male audiences. The production's Perth run was scheduled for March 23 through April 3, 2016. In April 2016 the production had scheduled engagements in South Africa, including stops in Pretoria, Cape Town, and Durban.

Burn the Floor returned to London with the production Fire in the Ballroom for a limited run, from 18 October to 5 November 2016.

== Alumni ==
Other notable alumni of Burn the Floor include:

- Natalie Lowe (joined 2005)
- Stephen Vincent (joined 2006)
- Mark Ballas (2010–11)
- Janette Manrara (joined 2010)
- Robbie Kmetoni (joined 2010)
- Maurizio Benenato (joined 2016)
- Dianne Buswell (joined 2011)
- Simone Arena (joined 2012)
- Giulia Dotta (joined 2012)
- Valeria Milova (joined 2012)
- Vitali Kozmin (joined 2012)
- Pasquale La Rocca (joined 2012)
- Kylee Vincent (joined 2013)
- Michael Danilczuk (joined 2015)
- Jowita Przystał (joined 2015)
- Johannes Radebe (joined 2015)
- Nancy Xu (joined 2015)
- Graziano di Prima (joined 2015)
- Emily Barker (joined 2016)
- Curtis Pritchard (joined 2016)
- Kai Widdrington (joined 2016)
- Alexandra Vladimirov (joined 2017)
- Rebecca Scott (joined 2023)
- Lauren Oakley
- Michelle Tsiakkas

== Cruises ==
As of 2013, Burn the Floor began giving performances on Norwegian Cruise ships.
