= Michael Danilczuk =

Polish dancer and choreographer (born 1992)

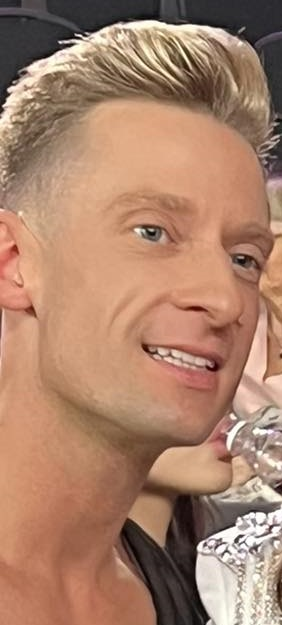
- Michael Danilczuk (2024)
- Born: 14 February 1992 (age 34); Białystok, Poland
- Occupations: Dancer; Choreographer
- Known for: The Greatest Dancer; Dancing with the Stars. Taniec z gwiazdami

Michał Danilczuk (born 14 February 1992), also known as Michael Danilczuk, is a Polish dancer and choreographer best known for winning the second season of the BBC One competition series, The Greatest Dancer with his partner, Jowita Przystał. He is also a professional dancer on the Polish and Irish versions of Strictly Come Dancing.

== Career ==
Danilczuk and his ex-partner Jowita Przystał have represented Poland in national and international competitions. In 2014 they became Polish Open Latin Champions. They have also performed with Burn the Floor. Danilczuk and Przystał have also performed in Broadway musical productions such as Legally Blonde, Priscilla, Queen of the Desert and Rock of Ages. They moved to London in 2019 to pursue careers in the United Kingdom.

== The Greatest Dancer ==
In January 2020, Danilczuk and Przystał auditioned for the second season of the BBC One show, The Greatest Dancer. After their audition, they advanced to call backs and were mentored by Strictly Come Dancing professional dancer, Oti Mabuse. On 7 March, 2020 they were crowned winners of the second series. The prize was £50,000 and an opportunity to perform on the next series of BBC One's Strictly Come Dancing.

Live Show	Music	Show Theme	Dance Theme	Vote	Result
1	"Kissing You"	Best of British	Shakespeare	8th 90.5%	Safe
2	"Crazy in Love"/"Bang Bang"	Props	Canes	3rd 95.3%	Safe
3	"Get the Party Started"	Around the World	Monte Carlo	3rd 92.4%	Safe
4	"Your Disco Needs You"/"You Should Be Dancing"/"Le Freak"/"Boogie Wonderland"	Dance Fusion	Disco	5th 90.5%	Safe
5	"Do You Love Me"/"(I've Had) The Time of My Life"	Coaches' Pick	Dirty Dancing	1st 96.5%	Safe
6	"The Ballroom Blitz", "Get the Party Started"	Final	Dance with captain Favourite dance	N/A	Winners

== Dancing with the Stars ==
=== Poland (Taniec z gwiazdami) ===
In July 2022, it was announced that Danilczuk would join the twenty-sixth season of the Polish version of Strictly Come Dancing. He partnered model and Prince Charming star, Jacek Jelonek, becoming the country's first ever same-sex pairing. The couple went on to reach the grand finale of the competition, they finished as runners-up to eventual winners, Ilona Krawczyńska and Robert Rowiński.

Series	Partner	Place
26	Jacek Jelonek	2nd
27	Julia Kuczyńska	3rd
28	Majka Jeżowska	4th

==== Series 26 (2022) ====
Celebrity partner
Jacek Jelonek; Average: 37.2; Place: 2nd

Week No.	Dance/Song	Judges' score				Total	Result
Week No.	Dance/Song	Piaseczny	Pavlović	Malitowski	Grabowski	Total	Result
1	Jive / "Everybody Needs Somebody to Love"	10	9	9	9	37	Safe
2	Tango / "I Will Survive"	9	8	8	9	34	Safe
3	Quickstep / "Mój przyjacielu"	10	10	10	10	40	Safe
4	Cha-cha-cha / "Poker Face"; Team Dance / "The Shoop Shoop Song (It's in His Kiss)"	8; 9	5; 9	7; 8	8; 9	28; 35	Safe
5	Foxtrot / "Jesienne róże"	9	7	7	8	31	Safe
6	R&R / "Do You Love Me"	10	8	10	10	38	Safe
7	Paso doble (with Agnieszka Lal) / "Canción del Mariachi"; Quickstep / "Ostatnia nadzieja"	10; 9	10; 9	10; 9	10; 10	40; 37	Safe
8	Cha-cha-cha / "Can't Stop the Feeling!"; Charleston / "We No Speak Americano"	10; 10	8; 10	9; 10	9; 10	36; 40	Safe
9	Jive (with Piotr Mróz) / "Wake Me Up Before You Go-Go"; Contemporary / "Fix You"; Paso doble / "Łowcy gwiazd"	10; 10; 10	10; 10; 10	10; 10; 10	10; 10; 10	40; 40; 40	Bottom two
10	Salsa / "Cuban Pete"; Foxtrot / "Jesienne róże" Freestyle / "The Greatest Show" & "This Is Me"	10; 10; 10	10; 9; 10	8; 9; 10	10; 10; 10	38; 38; 40	Runners-up

==== Series 27 (2024) ====
Celebrity partner
Julia Kuczyńska; Average: 35.7; Place: 3rd

Week No.	Dance/Song	Judges' score				Total	Result
Week No.	Dance/Song	Maserak	Kasprzyk	Wygoda	Pavlović	Total	Result
1	Jive / "Blinding Lights"	7	8	7	7	29	No elimination
2	Viennese waltz / "Earned It"	9	10	9	9	37	Safe
3	Cha-cha-cha / "Super Trouper"	8	9	8	8	33	Safe
4	Quickstep / "Wiosna – ach to ty!"	6	7	7	6	26	Safe
5	Rumba / "Miłość miłość"	8	9	8	8	33	Safe
6	Tango / "Murder on the Dancefloor"	9	9	9	8	35	Safe
7	Paso doble / "Bad Romance"; Waltz / "Hej Wy!"	8; 10	9; 10	9; 10	8; 10	34; 40	Safe
8	Foxtrot / "Just the Way You Are"; Salsa / "Conga"	10; 10	10; 10	10; 10	10; 10	40; 40	Safe
9	Samba / "Don't Go Yet"; Charleston / "All We Got"	9; 10	9; 10	9; 9	9; 8	36; 37	Safe
10	Cha-cha-cha / "I Don't Like It, I Love It"; Waltz / "Hej Wy!"; Freestyle / "In the End"	9; 10; 10	9; 10; 10	9; 10; 10	8; 10; 10	35; 40; 40	3rd place

==== Series 28 (2024) ====
Celebrity partner
Majka Jeżowska; Average: 31.7; Place: 4th

Week No.	Dance/Song	Judges' score				Total	Result
Week No.	Dance/Song	Maserak	Kasprzyk	Wygoda	Pavlović	Total	Result
1	Cha-cha-cha / "Sex Bomb"	9	9	8	8	34	No elimination
2	Tango / "Rumour Has It"	7	8	5	3	23	Safe
3	Country / "Texas Hold 'Em"	5	7	5	4	21	Safe
4	Viennese waltz / "Can I Call You Rose?"	7	9	7	6	29	Safe
5	Salsa / "A ja wolę moją mamę"	9	10	10	9	38	No elimination
6	Foxtrot / "Mniej niż zero"	9	9	8	7	33	Bottom three
7	Rumba / "Bad Dreams"; Tango / "Beze mnie"	8; 9	9; 9	8; 9	7; 7	32; 34	Safe
8	Paso doble / "Bloody Mary"; Contemporary / "People Help the People"	8; 10	9; 10	7; 9	6; 8	30; 37	Bottom two
9	Waltz / "Dumka na dwa serca" Jive / "I'll Be There for You"	9; 10	10; 10	8; 7	8; 7	35; 34	Eliminated

=== Ireland ===
In November 2022, it was announced that Danilczuk would be joining the sixth season of the Irish version of the show as a professional dancer. He was partnered with television presenter and entrepreneur, Suzanne Jackson. They reached the final, finishing as joint runners-up to Carl Mullan & Emily Barker.

Series	Partner	Place
6	Suzanne Jackson	2nd

==== Series 6 (2023) ====
Celebrity partner
Suzanne Jackson; Average: 25.8; Place: 2nd

Week No.	Dance/Song	Judges' score			Total	Result
Week No.	Dance/Song	Redmond	Barry	Gourounlian	Total	Result
1	Samba / "Woman"	7	8	8	23	No elimination
2	Viennese waltz / "Love On The Brain"	8	8	9	25	No elimination
3	Jive / "Runaround Sue"	5	5	5	15	Safe
4	Paso doble / "America"	8	7	8	23	Safe
5	Contemporary / "Keeping Your Head Up"	8	8	9	25	Safe
6	Cha-cha-cha / "Flashdance... What a Feeling"	7	8	8	23	No elimination
7	American Smooth / "I've Got You Under My Skin"	8	8	9	25	Bottom two
8	Charleston / "Hot Honey Rag"	9	10	10	29	Safe
9	Rumba / "Young and Beautiful"; Team Freestyle / "Crying at the Discoteque"	10; 8	10; 10	10; 10	30; 28	Safe
10	Tango / "Hungry Like the Wolf"; Marathon / "I Want Candy"	9 Awarded	10; 2	10; Points	29; 31	Bottom two
11	Samba / "Woman"; Freestyle / "Fire Under My Feet"	10; 10	10; 10	10; 10	30; 30	Runners-up
