= Loraine Barry =

Irish dancer and television personality (born 1964)

- Born: Loraine Barry; 10 December 1964 (age 61); Cabra, Dublin, Ireland
- Occupations: Dancer, Dancing with the Stars judge
- Spouse(s): Andrew Sinkinson (1989–1993); Luca Baricchi (1997–2010)

Loraine Barry (born 10 December 1964) is an Irish former professional dancer, also known for her role as Head judge on the RTÉ One series, Dancing with the Stars.

== Early life ==
Loraine Barry was born in Cabra in Dublin, Ireland. By the age of nineteen, Barry began to dance competitively with her partner Andrew Sinkinson.

Together Barry and Sinkinson won many Amateur titles such as British Youth Amateur Ballroom Championship. They also won the Amateur British Ballroom Championship three consecutive times in 1987, 1988, & 1989.

Barry & Sinkinson traveled around the world competing regularly and winning Grand Slam titles such as: the UK Championship, European Open Championship and World Championship. After winning the Blackpool Open Amateur Competition Loraine and Andrew decided to turn Professional in 1989.

== Professional dance career ==
In 1990 Barry and Sinkinson competed for the first time professionally at the Professional British Open and won the Slow Foxtrot over Marcus & Karen Hilton, and John Wood & Anne Lewis. This was deemed to be an unprecedented result for the couple as it was their first British Open Competition. In 1993 Barry and Sinkinson ended their partnership.

In 1993, Barry took up a partnership with Luca Baricchi. Together, they were crowned World Ballroom Dance Champions in 1999 and 2001 and British Open Champions three times 1999, 2000, & 2001, among many other accomplishments.

Loraine has also been awarded the Prince Mikasa Award, BDF Award, and Carl Alan Award.

== Media career ==
In January 2017, Barry became the Head judge on the Irish version of Dancing with the Stars for RTÉ One alongside Judges Brian Redmond and Julian Benson with Arthur Gourounlian joining the panel in 2022. In September 2025, she stood down from the programme.
