= Ray Kelly (singer) =

Irish Catholic priest and singer (born 1953)

The Reverend Father Ray Kelly S.P.S.
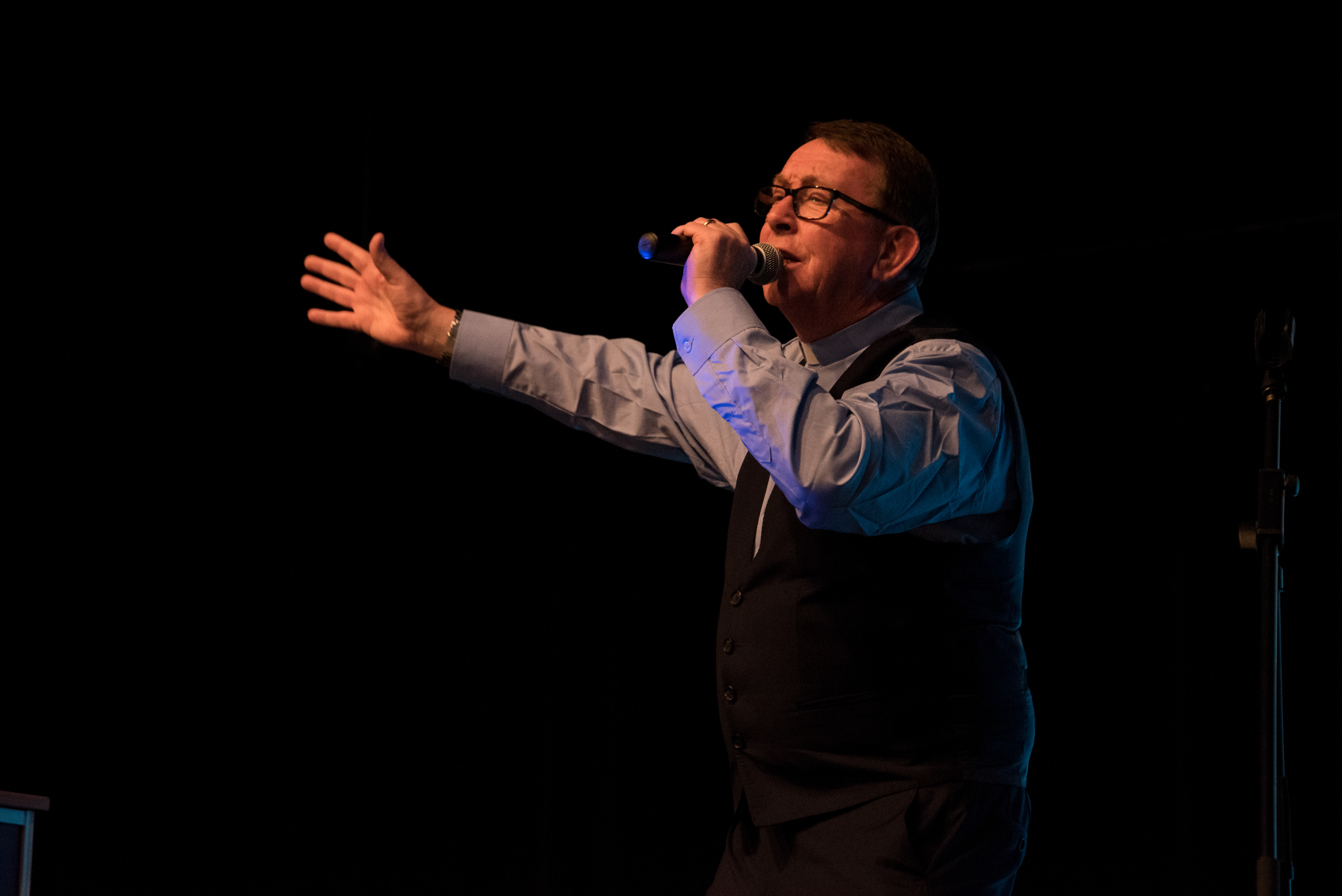
- Father Kelly singing at a charity event in Vienna on 2017
- Church: Catholic Church

Personal details
- Born: Raymond Kelly; 25 April 1953 (age 73) Tyrrellspass, County Westmeath, Ireland
- Denomination: Roman Catholic

Raymond Kelly, S.P.S. (born 25 April 1953), known as "The Singing Priest," is an Irish Catholic priest known for his interpretation of popular songs. He is a member of Saint Patrick's Society for the Foreign Missions.

Apart from his parish activities, he became famous for a YouTube viral video of him singing at a wedding at which he officiated, for his appearance as a contestant on Britain's Got Talent, and for his appearance as a contestant on Dancing with the Stars. He has a very large family and has sung at many of his relatives' and in-laws' weddings.

In May 2023 it was announced that he would be leaving his role as parish priest of St. Brigid's & St. Mary's parish at Oldcastle, County Meath, Ireland to become Associate Pastor in Kilcormac, Rahan and Eglish parishes in County Offaly, Ireland.

== Early life and priesthood ==
Kelly was born on 25 April 1953 in Tyrrellspass, County Westmeath, and began singing when he was young. In 1989 he was ordained as a priest and began his vocation.

== Music career ==
Kelly became famous in 2014 after a video of him singing Leonard Cohen's song "Hallelujah" while officiating at a couple's wedding became a YouTube sensation. The words were modified to suit the occasion by 10-year-old bridesmaid Lucy Pitts O'Connor. By early 2024, it had received more than 90 million hits.

In December 2014 Universal Music released a 10-track album Where I Belong of Kelly singing Celtic-inspired arrangements. The album was recorded during summer 2014 in a studio created for the purpose in Kelly's house, so that the recording schedule would not interfere with his duties as a priest. In December 2015 Kelly was a guest on the BBC Radio 4 programme Midweek.

== Television appearances ==
In 2018 Kelly auditioned for the 12th series of Britain's Got Talent, singing "Everybody Hurts" by R.E.M. He made it to the live shows but he was eliminated in semifinal 5. He came fourth in the public voting.

In 2020, he took part in the fourth season of the Irish edition of Dancing with the Stars. He and his professional partner, Kylee Vincent, were eliminated on 8 March 2020.

== Discography ==
=== Albums ===
- Where I Belong (2014)
- An Irish Christmas Blessing (2015)

== Books ==
- Kelly, Ray (2022). Hallelujah: Memoirs of a Singing Priest. Columba Books. ISBN 9781782183686.
