= Brian Redmond =

Irish dancer and Dancing with the Stars judge (born 1977)

- Born: Brian Redmond; 6 March 1977 (age 49); Blanchardstown, Dublin, Ireland
- Occupations: Dancer, Dancing with the Stars judge
- Spouse: Jen Redmond (2008-)
- Children: 2

Brian Redmond (born 6 March 1977) is an Irish dancer best known for his role as a judge on RTÉ One series, Dancing with the Stars. He was hired to be the "Simon Cowell" character of the show.

== Career ==
A dance professional, Redmond has travelled training and teaching, and has performed in London's Royal Albert Hall and the Kremlin Palace in Moscow.

In January 2017, Redmond was named, alongside Loraine Barry and Julian Benson, as a judge on the Irish version of Dancing with the Stars for RTÉ One.

The KCLR Daily with Brian Redmond was formerly KCLR Live with Brian Redmond. Redmond has been a presenter with KCLR 96FM since late 2019. Redmond also appears regularly as a panelist on the RTE Today Show on RTÉ One and has appeared on The Late Late Show, the Ray D’Arcy Show and The Ryan Tubridy Show

In December 2018, Redmond appeared on a one-off charity special of Ireland's Fittest Family alongside his wife, Jen, and two other relatives. They were eliminated in the first round, raising €1,000 for their chosen charity, the LauraLynn Foundation.

== Personal life ==
Redmond married Jen Redmond in May 2008. They have two children together.
