= Valeria Milova =

Estonian dancer and choreographer

- Born: 13 March 1988 (age 38); Narva, then part of Estonian SSR, Soviet Union
- Occupations: Dancer; Choreographer
- Known for: Dancing with the Stars (Irish series)
- Partner: Vitali Kozmin
- Children: 3
- Family: Alika Milova (sister)

Valeria Milova (born 13 March 1988) is an Estonian dancer and choreographer. She is best known for her role as a professional dancer on the Irish and Turkish versions of Dancing with the Stars.

== Career ==
Milova started dancing at the age of eight. She is a former Estonian national hip hop dancing champion and has represented her country at the World and European Latin-American Championships. She has also been a finalist in the IDSF Amateur European Union Latin Championship and WDSF World Showdance Latin Championship in 2015.

In 2015, Milova joined the Burn the Floor cruise tour.

In 2019, Milova performed as a cast member of Heartbeat of Home, a live dance show produced by the producers of Riverdance. The show ran at the Piccadilly Theatre in the West End, London. Milova also served as choreographer for two numbers in the production.

Milova co-created and choreographed the ballroom dance stage production Ballroom Theatre together with dancer and choreographer Vitali Kozmin.

== Dancing with the Stars ==
=== Turkey (Yok Böyle Dans) ===
In 2011, Milova was announced as one of the professional dancers for Yok Böyle Dans, the Turkish version of Dancing with the Stars. Milova was paired with soccer player Pascal Nouma. They reached the final of the competition finishing in second place.

In 2012, Milova returned for the second, and final, season of Yok Böyle Dans. She was paired with Survivor Turkey contestant, Aydın Gülşen. They reached the fifth week of the competition before being eliminated, finishing in twelfth place.

| Series | Partner | Place |
|---|---|---|
| 1 | Pascal Nouma | 2nd |
| 2 | Aydın Gülşen | 12th |

=== Ireland ===
In 2017, Milova was announced as one of the professional dancers for the first series of Dancing with the Stars. She was partnered with Kerry footballer, Aidan O'Mahony. On the 26 March 2017, O'Mahony and Milova were crowned the first ever champions of the series.

In 2018, Milova was partnered with comedian, actor and RTÉ 2FM presenter, Bernard O'Shea. They reached the seventh week of the competition, finishing in eighth place.

In 2019, Milova was partnered with Dublin footballer, Denis Bastick. They reached the ninth week of the competition, finishing in sixth place.

| Series | Partner | Place |
|---|---|---|
| 1 | Aidan O'Mahony | 1st |
| 2 | Bernard O'Shea | 8th |
| 3 | Denis Bastick | 6th |

Highest and Lowest Scoring Per Dance

| Dance | Partner | Highest | Partner | Lowest |
|---|---|---|---|---|
| American Smooth | Aidan O'Mahony | 25 | Bernard O'Shea | 14 |
| Cha-cha-cha | Aidan O'Mahony | 22 | Peter Stringer^{1} | 16 |
| Charleston | Aidan O'Mahony | 28 | Denis Bastick | 23 |
| Contemporary Ballroom | | | | |
| Foxtrot | Denis Bastick | 23 | | |
| Jive | Aidan O'Mahony | 20 | | |
| Paso Doble | Denis Bastick | 24 | Aidan O'Mahony | 16 |
| Quickstep | Aidan O'Mahony | 16 | | |
| Rumba | | | | |
| Salsa | Dayl Cronin^{1} | 30 | Bernard O'Shea | 17 |
| Samba | Jake Carter^{1} | 24 | | |
| Showdance | Aidan O'Mahony | 30 | | |
| Tango | Aidan O'Mahony | 19 | Bernard O'Shea | 10 |
| Viennese Waltz | Aidan O'Mahony | 24 | Bernard O'Shea | 13 |
| Waltz | Aidan O'Mahony | 22 | Denis Bastick | 20 |

^{1} These scores was awarded during Switch-Up Week.

==== Series 1 ====
Celebrity partner
Aidan O'Mahony; Average: 21.6; Place: 1st

| Week No. | Dance/Song | Judges' score | | | Total | Result |
|---|---|---|---|---|---|---|
| Week No. | Dance/Song | Redmond | Barry | Benson | Total | Result |
| 1 | Salsa / "Fireball" | 6 | 6 | 7 | 19 | No elimination |
| 2 | No dance performed | - | - | - | - | No elimination |
| 3 | Quickstep / "Little Talks" | 5 | 5 | 6 | 16 | Safe |
| 4 | Paso Doble / "Indiana Jones theme" | 5 | 5 | 6 | 16 | Safe |
| 5 | American Smooth / "My Baby Just Cares for Me" | 7 | 7 | 7 | 21 | Safe |
| 6 | Tango / "Easy Lover" | 6 | 7 | 6 | 19 | Safe |
| 7 | Salsa / "Give Me Everything" | 10 | 10 | 10 | 30 | No elimination Switch-Up Week with Dayl Cronin |
| 8 | Waltz / "Fly Me to the Moon" | 7 | 8 | 7 | 22 | Safe |
| 9 | Charleston / "I Got a Woman" | 9 | 10 | 9 | 28 | Safe |
| 10 | Cha-cha-cha / "Cake by the Ocean"; Ballroom Blitz / "The Ballroom Blitz" | 7 Extra | 7; 2 | 8 Points | 22; 24 | Safe |
| 11 | Jive / "Drive It like You Stole It"; Viennese Waltz / "Somebody to Love" | 6; 8 | 7; 8 | 7; 8 | 20; 24 | Safe |
| 12 | American Smooth / "My Baby Just Cares for Me"; Salsa / "Fireball"; Showdance / "Holding Out for a Hero" | 8; 8; 10 | 8; 8; 10 | 9; 9; 10 | 25; 25; 30 | Series winners |

==== Series 2 ====
Celebrity partner
Bernard O'Shea; Average: 14.2; Place: 8th

| Week No. | Dance/Song | Judges' score | | | Total | Result |
|---|---|---|---|---|---|---|
| Week No. | Dance/Song | Redmond | Barry | Benson | Total | Result |
| 1 | Tango / "Video Killed the Radio Star" | 2 | 4 | 4 | 10 | No elimination |
| 2 | No dance performed | - | - | - | - | No elimination |
| 3 | Salsa / "He's the Greatest Dancer" | 5 | 6 | 6 | 17 | Safe |
| 4 | Paso Doble / "He's a Pirate" | 6 | 6 | 6 | 18 | Safe |
| 5 | American Smooth / "Be Young, Be Foolish, Be Happy" | 4 | 5 | 5 | 14 | Safe |
| 6 | Samba / "Mi Gente" | 8 | 8 | 8 | 24 | No elimination Switch-Up Week with Jake Carter |
| 7 | Viennese Waltz / "What's New Pussycat?" | 4 | 4 | 5 | 13 | Eliminated |

==== Series 3 ====
Celebrity partner
Denis Bastick; Average: 19.6; Place: 6th

| Week No. | Dance/Song | Judges' score | | | Total | Result |
|---|---|---|---|---|---|---|
| Week No. | Dance/Song | Redmond | Barry | Benson | Total | Result |
| 1 | American Smooth / "It's a Beautiful Day" | 4 | 5 | 6 | 15 | No elimination |
| 2 | No dance performed | - | - | - | - | No elimination |
| 3 | Cha-cha-cha / "Promises (David Guetta Remix)" | 5 | 6 | 6 | 17 | Safe |
| 4 | Tango / "Danger Zone" | 4 | 5 | 5 | 14 | Safe |
| 5 | Charleston / "The Power" | 7 | 8 | 8 | 23 | Safe |
| 6 | Cha-cha-cha / "Body" | 5 | 5 | 6 | 16 | No elimination Switch-Up Week with Peter Stringer |
| 7 | Waltz / "I Wonder Why" | 6 | 7 | 7 | 20 | Safe |
| 8 | Foxtrot / "Someone like You" | 7 | 8 | 8 | 23 | Safe |
| 9 | Paso Doble / "Carnaval de Paris"; Team Freestyle / "All That Jazz (Castro Remix)" | 8; 9 | 8; 10 | 8; 10 | 24; 29 | Eliminated |

== Personal life ==
Milova is married to dancer and fellow-Dancing with the Stars cast member, Vitali Kozmin. They have three children together, including a son, Konstantin, and a daughter, Kira.

Milova's sister, Alika Milova, is a singer and winner of the Estonian version of Pop Idol - Eesti otsib superstaari and Estonia's Eurovision Song Contest 2023 entry.
