= Peta Roby =

Australian dancer and choreographer

Peta Roby is an Australian dancer and choreographer. With dance partner Jason Gilkison, she won multiple Australian national titles. Roby has also worked with Gilkison on the stage show Burn the Floor.

== Early life ==
Roby was born in Perth, Australia. Roby started dancing with Jason Gilkison at age of seven. During her senior year of high school, Roby and Gilkison moved to London for two months of training and returned to London for further training after graduation.

== Career ==
=== Competitive dancing ===
Roby formed a professional partnership with Gilkison in 1980 and together they were undefeated Australian Latin champions from 1981 to 1997. At age 23, Gilkison and Roby were the top ranked pair in Ten-Dance Competition. Although competing for Australia, Roby and Gilkison taught in London in the 1990s. Both also appeared in the 1996 film version of Evita.

=== Burn the Floor ===
In 1997, Roby, Gilkison, and several other dance couples performed at Elton John's birthday party. Producer Harley Medcalf was in the audience and approached Gilkison about using dance in theater. The idea turned in to Burn the Floor, which Roby began working on in 1999. From 1999 to 2005 Roby was a principal dancer in the show. The show began as something geared towards arenas before scaling back and becoming more "urban" influenced around 2005. That same year, Roby transitioned to working behind the scenes as company manager and executive producer. She was credited as an Associate Producer when the show went to Broadway in 2009.

== Personal life ==
Roby met Nic Notley in 1985 when he saw Roby and Gilkison dance. Roby and Notley married four years later. In 2015 the couple moved from Perth to Milan, Italy.
