= Louise McSharry =

Irish broadcaster and DJ

- Born: 1982 (age 43–44); Dublin, Ireland
- Occupations: Broadcaster, disc jockey
- Known for: RTÉ 2fm
- Spouse: Gordon Spierin (m. 2015, separated)
- Children: 2

Louise McSharry (born 1982) is an Irish broadcaster and disc jockey known for her work on RTÉ 2fm.

== Background ==
McSharry was born in Dublin, Ireland. Her father died of cancer at the age of 28, when she was 3 years old. In 1989, she moved to the United States with her mother, Dee, and her younger brother, Andrew. They first lived in Los Angeles, later moving to Chicago.

As a result of their mother’s alcoholism, McSharry and her brother were placed in the custody of their aunt and uncle, Ger and Ruaidhrí, who also lived in Chicago. McSharry returned to Ireland with her family at the age of 16 while her mother remained in the US.

McSharry attended the same secondary school as her future 2fm colleague Eoghan McDermott. They also attended University College Dublin together.

== Career ==
McSharry began her radio career at Newstalk before moving to iRadio in Galway. She joined 2fm in 2010. In 2013, she was asked to stand in for Ryan Tubridy on his flagship 2fm show. She announced her departure from 2fm on 29 October 2021.

In 2016, she published a memoir, Fat Chance: My Life in Ups and Downs and Crisp Sandwiches.

She currently has a podcast, titled Catch Up with Louise McSharry.

== Personal life ==
McSharry was diagnosed with Hodgkin lymphoma in 2014. During treatment, she took a career break until 2015.

She married Gordon Spierin in 2015 at Ballinacurra House in Kinsale, County Cork. They have two sons: Sam, born in 2016, and Ted, born in 2019.

McSharry's mother Dee died in 2016.

In 2025 McSharry came out as gay, on her podcast Catch Up with Louise McSharry.

== Bibliography ==
- Fat Chance: My Life in Ups and Downs and Crisp Sandwiches (2016)
