= Eva Orsmond =

Weight loss expert

- Born: 13 March 1966 (age 60); Helsinki, Finland
- Education: University of Pavia
- Years active: 2000–present
- Spouse: Wyatt Orsmond (m. 1995)
- Children: 2
- Website: drevasclinics.ie

Eva Orsmond (born 13 March 1966) is a weight loss expert born in Finland but based in Ireland since moving there in 2000.

== Career ==
Orsmond qualified in medicine at Pavia University in 1990, then trained in public health at the Nordiska högskolan för folkhälsovetenskap in Gothenburg. She worked in Bangladesh, Finland and Namibia before moving to Ireland in 2000.

Orsmond owns four Orsmond Clinics around Ireland, which she set up in 2001. Orsmond has appeared on Off the Rails, The Big Bite, Prime Time, The Late Late Show, Saturday Night Show, Meet the Family, Corrigan Knows Food, Claire Byrne Live, The Nolan Show, The Ray D'arcy Show and was a medical consultant on the RTÉ weight loss show Operation Transformation, which she quit in October 2015.

In January 2016, Eva Orsmond presented Sugar Crash an RTÉ documentary about sugar consumption and health issues of the Irish population. She has also appeared in The Restaurant. In 2017, she appeared on the first season of the Irish version of Dancing with the Stars.

== Views ==
Orsmond stated that "pregnant women allowing themselves to be overweight is criminal"; these comments drew objections from a number of obesity experts, published in an open letter. She has also said in interviews that there's nothing wrong with women aspiring to have the body of a Victoria's Secret model. She has further said that children should be weighed in school to help tackle Ireland’s obesity crisis. Orsmond has also stated that in her opinion a sugar tax would stop people from eating sugar.

== Personal life ==
In 1995, Orsmond married South African Wyatt Orsmond with whom she has two children. She lived in Cape Town, South Africa, for five years before moving to Ireland in 2000. Orsmond revealed in a 2015 interview that she has taken up pole dancing to help keep fit.
