= Luca and Loraine Baricchi =

Irish and Italian ballroom dancing duo

Luca and Loraine Baricchi are ballroom dancers and dance teachers from Ireland and Italy. As professional ballroom dancers, they competed for England. They twice won the Professional World Ballroom Dance Championship (1999, 2001). The couple also won the International Professional Standard Championship in London in 1999–2000, and are former British Open, UK and European champions. After regaining the World title in 2001, they decided to retire from competitive dancing.

Luca Baricchi was born on 4 July 1969 in Reggio Emilia, Italy to a family of Italian dance teachers. Loraine was born Loraine Barry in Dublin, Ireland.

The Baricchis had married and started dancing together in 1993. The previous partner of Luca was Amanda Owen and Loraine's was Andrew Sinkinson (both couples split in 1993).

As of 2023 they are divorced and they are dance teachers (owing different studios) in the United States.
