= Arthur Gourounlian =

Armenian-born professional dancer (born 1980)

- Born: 1 June 1980 (age 46); Armenian SSR
- Occupations: Dancer; choreographer; creative director; television personality
- Spouse: Brian Dowling (m. 2015)
- Children: 2

Arthur Gourounlian (Armenian: Արթուր Գուրունլեան, romanized: Art’ur Gurunlean; born 1 June 1980) is an Armenian-born Irish professional dancer and television personality, featuring as the Armenian judge on the James Corden hosted reality series, The World's Best.

== Early life ==
Arthur Gourounlian was born and raised in Armenia. In 1992, Gourounlian and his family were forced to leave the war-torn country during the First Nagorno-Karabakh War. Gorounlian along with his parents, sister, aunt and cousin sought asylum in Brussels. Gourounlian trained as a barber before travelling between Italy, Spain and France working as a go-go dancer in nightclubs. In 2002, Gourounlian moved to London to pursue a career in dancing professionally. He now lives in Ireland with his Irish husband.

== Career ==
Gourounlian had a successful career as a back-up dancer for musicians including Girls Aloud, Beyoncé, Sibel Tüzün, P!nk, Pussycat Dolls, Bananarama, Will Young, Kylie Minogue and Cheryl.

As a creative director, Gourounlian has worked on campaigns for some of the most recognisable brands in the world including, Louboutin, Diesel, Puma, Jean-Paul Gaultier, Mary Kay, Walkers Crisps and Coca-Cola.

In 2019, Gourounlian appeared as the Armenian judge on The World's Best alongside host, James Corden and main judges, Drew Barrymore, Faith Hill and RuPaul. Later that year, Gorounlian and his husband, Brian Dowling appeared on a charity special of Ireland's Fittest Family where they finished in third place, earning €1,000 for charity.

On 12 November 2021, Gourounlian was confirmed as the new judge on the Irish version of Dancing with the Stars beginning January 2022. He replaced Julian Benson on the panel.

In 2023, Gourounlian and Dowling featured in a documentary Brian & Arthur’s Very Modern Family and released a book titled Brian and Arthur’s Modern Family: Births, Marriages, Deaths and Everything.

== Personal life ==
On 30 July 2015, Gourounlian married television presenter and two-time Big Brother winner, Brian Dowling at a ceremony in Powerscourt Estate, County Wicklow, Ireland. In 2021, they rented a house in Dowling's home county of Kildare. On 1 September 2022, Gourounlian and Dowling welcomed their first child, a daughter named Blake Maria Rose Dowling Gourounlian. On 23 June 2024, they welcomed a second daughter Blu Amar Rose Dowling Gourounlian. Dowling's sister Aoife acted as surrogate for the couple. She continues to play a large role in their lives, taking on extensive child rearing on a daily basis.
