= 2025 Rose of Tralee =

- Date: 18–19 August 2025
- Presenters: Dáithí Ó Sé; Kathryn Thomas
- Venue: Kerry Sports Academy, Munster Technological University, Tralee, County Kerry, Ireland
- Broadcaster: RTÉ
- Entrants: 32
- Winner: Katelyn Cummins (Laois)

The 2025 Rose of Tralee was the 65th edition of the annual Irish international festival held on 18–19 August 2025. The competition was televised live on RTÉ television. It was the third year of co-hosts with Kathryn Thomas joining Dáithí Ó Sé on stage.

Master of Ceremonies for the first time was former escort Carl Mullan who introduced all 32 Roses on stage across both nights.

The Laois Rose, 20-year-old apprentice electrician Katelyn Cummins, was named as the 2025 International Rose of Tralee. This was the first time that Laois had ever won the event, and it was the first Irish victory in the event since 2022.
