= Stephanie Kelly =

Irish actor from Ballymun, Dublin

- Born: 31 July 1987 (age 38); Dublin, Ireland
- Occupation: Actor
- Television: Fair City

Stephanie Kelly (born 31 July 1987) is an Irish actor from Ballymun, Dublin. She is best known for her role as Sasha "Sash" Bishop in the Irish soap opera, Fair City, for which she has starred in since 2011.

== Career ==
Kelly began acting with a Ballymun youth theatre group. From there she went on to act on stage including a starring role in 'Cleaners' in The Axis Theatre in 2014.

In 2008, Kelly made her onscreen debut in the acclaimed Irish independent film, Kisses.

In 2011, Kelly was cast as Sasha "Sash" Bishop in the RTÉ soap opera, Fair City. Her initial storylines as part of the Bishop family saw her involved in some of the soaps most dramatic storylines. The character has widely become one of the soap's most beloved characters due to her confrontational, humorous and no-nonsense personality.

Over the years, Kelly's character has continued to be involved in some of the programmes most memorable storylines involving surrogacy, homelessness, domestic abuse and sexuality.

In December 2025, Kelly was announced as one of the celebrities taking part in the ninth season of Dancing with the Stars.

== Personal life ==
Kelly was born and raised in Ballymun, a suburb in North Dublin.

Kelly has spoken openly about her personal hardships. After the birth of her first son, Zach. Kelly found herself as a lone parent, financially unstable and facing homelessness.

Kelly married Craig Hopkins in 2022. Along with Kelly's son, Zach, they have two more children together, Rosie and Finn.

== Filmography ==
Year	Film/Television	Role	Notes
2008	Kisses	Kylie's Sister	
2011–2012, 2015–2021, 2023–present	Fair City	Sasha "Sash" Bishop	Regular role
2026	Dancing with the Stars	Herself	
