= Laura Fox =

Irish television and radio presenter

- Born: 8 November 1990 (age 36); Galway, Ireland
- Education: Galway Business School, Dublin Business School
- Occupations: Radio and television presenter
- Known for: RTÉ 2fm, Ireland's Fittest Family
- Spouse: Brian Moran (Married 2026 - Present)

Laura Fox (born 8 November 1990) is an Irish television and radio presenter who currently hosts the RTÉ 2fm Drive Show every weekday, as well as the RTÉ One competition programme, Ireland's Fittest Family. She was a contestant on the 2024 edition of Dancing with the Stars and co-presented it in 2026.

== Early life ==
Fox's mother gave birth to her at the age of nineteen and was raised in a single-parent home. Her mother married and had more children.

Fox is a former beauty queen. She reached the final stages of Miss Ireland 2014.

Fox studied Marketing and PR in Galway Business School before attaining a degree in journalism from Dublin Business School.

== Career ==
Fox began her radio career in 2015 as a presenter on Galway Bay FM. In 2017, Fox joined the RTÉ digital radio station RTÉ Pulse while also working as a relief presenter on RTÉ 2fm. Fox hosted the podcast 'Unlocked' alongside her RTÉ 2fm colleague, Emma Power. In 2022, it was announced that Fox would host her own weekend breakfast show from 9 am-12 pm on RTÉ 2fm.

In June 2023, it was announced that Fox would be the host of the eleventh season of the RTÉ One television series, Ireland's Fittest Family taking over from Mairead Ronan. She took part in the 2024 edition of Dancing with the Stars, where she reached the grand final. In May 2024, Fox took over 2fm's coveted 9 am to 12 pm from outgoing presenter Jennifer Zamparelli, who she had been covering for several weeks.

In January 2026, Fox filled in for Doireann Garrihy while she was on maternity leave for series 9 of Dancing with the Stars.

== Personal life ==
Fox is in a long-term relationship with her partner, Brian Moran, and they got engaged in 2024 and married in 2026.
