= The Style Counsellors =

Irish television series

The Style Counsellors is an Irish style and beauty makeover series that first aired on RTÉ One on 7 January 2020. Series one consisted of six episodes and was presented by Suzanne Jackson and Eileen Smith. Series two started airing in January 2021. The show was cancelled by RTÉ in August 2023 in an effort to shake up its programming.
