= Suzanne Jackson (blogger) =

Irish writer

Suzanne Jackson O'Connor
- Born: Suzanne Jackson; 22 October 1984 (age 41); Dublin, Ireland
- Spouse: Dylan O’Connor (m. 2017)

Suzanne Jackson O'Connor(born 22 October 1984, Dublin) is an Irish television presenter, blogger and businessperson. She is the creator of the blog SoSueMe.

== Career ==
Jackson began blogging in 2010. By 2013, she left her job and began working full-time on her blog. In 2016, she released a range of beauty products called 'SoSu Cosmetics'. She has been criticised following reports that her range of cosmetics is produced through private labelling, but she says this is not true. In 2018, Jackson launched a second tan brand, 'Dripping Gold'. In 2020 her company, Cohar Ltd, reported profits of €2.12m.

In July 2022, Jackson announced her plans to step down as CEO of her beauty brand, 'SoSu Cosmetics' and tan brand 'Dripping Gold'. In October 2022, she named Caroline Dalton as her successor.

== Media career ==
In April 2019, Jackson appeared as a guest on The Late Late Show.

In 2020, Jackson began co-hosting the RTÉ makeover show, The Style Counsellors alongside influencer, Eileen Smith. The show returned for a second season in 2021 and a third in 2022 with Jackson assuming main hosting duties and Smith taking a smaller role due in part to social distancing regulations around COVID-19 and Smith's age. A fourth season is due to air in 2023.

In January 2023, Jackson became a contestant in the sixth series of Dancing with the Stars. She was partnered with new professional, Michael Danilczuk. While participating in the show, Jackson scored the highest score ever (30) in the show's history for the rumba and samba. Jackson and Danilczuk reached the final, eventually finishing as joint runners-up to Carl Mullan and Emily Barker.

== Personal life ==
Jackson grew up in Skerries, County Dublin. In 2017 she married Dylan O'Connor. Her wedding was covered by Irish news and media outlets with pictures in RSVP Magazine. As of 2019, the couple live in Malahide. In May 2021, Jackson announced her plans to emigrate to Portugal. One month later, in June 2021, Jackson announced that she was to remain living in Ireland.
