= Garron Noone =

Irish musician, comedian and TikToker

- Born: 5 June 1994 (age 32); Dublin, Ireland
- Occupations: Musician, comedian, spokesmodel, YouTuber, TikToker
- Years active: 2023–present
- Known for: Instagram, TikTok and YouTube videos

Garron Noone (born 5 June 1994) is an Irish musician, YouTuber, comedian, and Internet personality. He is primarily known for his comedic commentary videos reviewing various foods and Irish towns on his social media. Noone rose to prominence online, uploading to his TikTok and YouTube channels and garnering over 2.4 and 1 million followers respectively.

== Early and personal life ==
Noone was born in Dublin, but when he was one year old, the family moved to be closer to his mother's family, who ran a sheep farm in County Mayo. Noone and his three younger siblings grew up in Ballina, County Mayo.

Noone has agoraphobia, which led to him being housebound for five years. Due to this, he dropped out of school when he was 15. He returned to Youthreach at age 21 to earn his Leaving Certificate. Noone overcame his agoraphobia through exposure therapy, starting with taking 10 steps outdoors and expanding that over time.

Noone learned to drive more recently, helping drive donated ambulances to Africa. He has largely preferred to travel by train.

== Music career ==
Noone's mother played the guitar and his father sang in an Elvis tribute band, sparking his interest in music as a child. As a teenager, he got his first gigs playing the guitar in pubs and taught himself music production.

When the COVID-19 pandemic occurred, Noone returned from Galway to Ballina. He started uploading tutorial videos on creating dance music and music production, which led to people asking him for private lessons. A university in the United Kingdom also asked him to teach modules for their master's course.

In 2024, Noone played the Acts of Big Love concert on Grafton Street in Dublin to support those with mental illness.

On 23 August 2025, Noone joined Robbie Williams on stage at Croke Park.

From 14 May 2026, Noone will play his first live shows in London at the Irish Cultural Centre, Hammersmith.

== Online career ==
Noone was named one of Ireland's "breakthrough stars" for 2023 on TikTok. He rose from having just a few thousand followers in early 2023, while posting music tutorials, to over a million in February 2024 after transitioning to comedy. As of October 2026, he has 1.2 million subscribers and 526 million views on YouTube, 3 million followers on Instagram, and 2.4 million followers and over 54 million views on TikTok. (Note: As of July 2023, he had 3,670 subscribers on YouTube and 238,200 on TikTok.)

His catchphrase, "Follow me, I'm delicious" came about when he made a video that he did not think was particularly funny, so he randomly added it to the end. When he made future videos without it, he got comments from viewers asking for it. People now shout the phrase at him on the street and send him photos of objects with the word "delicious." The phrase was the inspiration for an ad campaign for a coffee company where Noone served as spokesman.

In 2024, Noone won the Gossie Award for newcomer of the year. Later that year, Noone released his podcast Listen, I'm Delicious, named after his catchphrase.

On 23 November 2025, Noone was chosen to turn on the official Christmas lights in Ballina.

== Comedy career ==
Noone's stand-up comedy was featured on the BBC program Big Comic Energy.
