= Katja Mia =

Irish TV personality (born 1996)

- Born: 17 May 1996 (age 30)
- Education: Maynooth University
- Occupations: Television presenter; Model; Social media influencer
- Employer: Virgin Media Television (Ireland)
- Notable credit: Ireland AM

Katja Mia (born 17 May 1996) is an Irish model, social media influencer and television presenter, known for her work on Ireland AM.

== Early life and education ==
Mia was raised in Lucan, Dublin. Her parents fled war-torn Burundi and sought asylum in Germany before eventually settling in Ireland. In 2018, she graduated from Maynooth University, where she studied international finance, economics and German.

== Career ==
Mia was discovered by a modelling agency in the summer of 2020 after she posted pictures online. She describes herself as "a curve model or plus sized model." In October 2022, Mia guest hosted Virgin Media Ireland's flagship morning show for a week filling in for permanent host Muireann O'Connell. One month later, in November 2022, it was announced that Mia would take up full-time hosting duties of the weekend edition of the programme alongside Martin King and Elaine Crowley. On 21 November 2023, it was announced that Mia would leave Ireland AM to join Brian Dowling as the new permanent hosts of The 6 O'Clock Show replacing Karen Koster and Greg O'Shea. Mia participated in the seventh series of RTÉ One show Dancing with the Stars where she finished in sixth place.

== Personal life ==
Since 2017, Mia has been in a relationship with social media influencer Daragh Curran, also known as The Guinness Guru. She has spoken openly about being a victim of racial abuse in Ireland and has spoken out in support of the Black Lives Matter movement.
