= Eoghan McDermott =

Irish presenter (born 1983)

- Born: 15 April 1983 (age 42); Limerick, Ireland
- Other names: Eoghan Mac Diarmada
- Occupations: Presenter, actor, choreographer
- Employer(s): Raidió Teilifís Éireann (RTÉ); Teilifís na Gaeilge (TG4); Channel 5
- Known for: The Voice of Ireland; The Eoghan McDermott Show; Love Island Australia; 2FM Breakfast with Doireann and Eoghan

Eoghan McDermott (born 15 April 1983) is an Irish television and radio presenter. He has presented The RTÉ 2fm Breakfast Show on radio and hosted The Voice of Ireland and Ireland's Junior Eurovision Song Contest selection shows on television. He began his career presenting POP4, a music programme on TG4. He also hosted Xfm Drivetime on radio in the United Kingdom and has narrated Love Island Australia on television.

== Early life ==
McDermott was born in Limerick but grew up in Dublin. His father is Kevin McDermott, an author. He is a middle child, the only boy either side of two sisters. His younger sister, Roe McDermott, has written for Hot Press magazine.

When younger, and before he had a career in the media, McDermott intended to become a Garda (police officer) or a schoolteacher.

== Career ==
=== Television ===
McDermott is a fluent speaker of the Irish language and originally started his media career on TG4's POP4, a music request and top 40 show. This was followed by a role in TG4's youth drama Seacht, in which he played the lead role of Pete. From here he progressed to POP4, a weekly chart music show with live bands. Other presenting credits followed, including Frenemies – a youth debate game show for RTÉ2 and Immeal Geall, a bilingual magazine show for BBC Northern Ireland. He co-presented a series of The Movie Show on RTÉ2, which started in November 2012.

In 2008, McDermott entered MTV UK's Pick Me MTV competition, but lost out to Laura Whitmore.

In September 2013, McDermott had his UK television debut, fronting UK reality show Celebrity Super Spa for Channel 5. Other credits include a 2013 highlight show Totes Amazeballs and Next Year's News, a satirical comedy-panel show anticipating big news stories for the year ahead. Both series broadcast on RTÉ2. He has co-presented The Voice of Ireland with Kathryn Thomas since its inception. For season 3 of The Voice, McDermott fronted a live spin-off show on RTÉ2. He filmed a new series entitled Drunk for RTÉ2 in summer 2014, examining the effects of alcohol on the body and mind.

In 2015, he began hosting Junior Eurovision Eire, Ireland's national selection programme for the Junior Eurovision Song Contest, which he hosted from 2015 to 2019, Ireland did not participate in 2020 and Louise Cantillon replaced him as host in 2021. He also filmed a pilot episode for a UK game show in Paris, which was made by the team behind Gogglebox.

In June 2020, he hosted the telethon event RTÉ Does Comic Relief, held to raise funds during the COVID-19 pandemic.

McDermott has also narrated the reality dating series Love Island Australia. On 20 September 2020, ITV Australia announced Stephen Mullan would replace him on Love Island Australia as "the narrator".

=== Acting ===
McDermott played the lead role of "DJ Pete" in all four series of the joint TG4/BBC Northern Ireland production, Seacht, a teen drama. Of his time on Seacht, McDermott later said: "That's the beauty of starting on a channel that doesn’t have a huge audience: you can make a lot of mistakes that go under the radar".

=== Choreography ===
McDermott completed his dance training at the Broadway Dance Center and has worked as a dancer and choreographer, supporting acts such as Rihanna, Pussycat Dolls and Chris Brown.

=== Radio ===
McDermott started his radio career on a bi-lingual chart music show on Dublin radio station SPIN 1038 in 2009. He also co-presented the successful "Sunday Service" before being poached by Global Radio in the UK.

In 2011 he moved abroad to the UK, where he began duties as host of Drive Time with radio station XFM. In his first year, McDermott's show was syndicated to XFM Manchester. Shortly after, he was nominated for "Best Newcomer" in the national commercial radio awards, sponsored by Arqiva. In April 2012, The Guardian newspaper, whilst discussing the new appointment of Greg James on BBC Radio1 Drivetime, claimed McDermott's show was the best DriveTime radio show of its genre in the UK.

His final show with the station aired on 21 December 2012. He said: "I left XFM because I had done it for two years. It is a great place to work with great people but I had had to turn down several pilots because of work. So I decided I wanted to focus on TV work and to do that I had to leave Xfm. And then I got Celebrity Super Spa." It coincided with a management change and the departure of Mary Anne Hobbs to 6 Music and Breakfast presenter Danny Wallace – although in a Twitter post shortly after his departure McDermott noted his final listenership figures were a record high. Although online speculation suggested a move to BBC Radio 1, this never materialised.

In June 2014, it was announced that McDermott would present a show on RTÉ 2fm radio on the 7 – 10 am slot on Saturday and Sunday starting on 6 July. Three months later, it was announced that he would stand in for Louise McSharry on the station's weekday evening slot for the next few months while she receives treatment for cancer. In September 2015, McDermott took over from the Driveby show from Colm Hayes under a two-year contract.

In June 2019, McDermott began presenting the new breakfast show on RTÉ 2fm alongside Doireann Garrihy.

On 8 March 2021, RTÉ officially confirmed that McDermott had left his 2FM role after 3 weeks of "unplanned leave" and that he would not be returning due to the expiry of his contract.

=== Mental health advocacy ===
McDermott gives talks throughout Ireland at various events about mental illness. He made a video on the topic of self-harm for Pieta House in 2014, in which he referred to his own experience and later explained: "When you see first-hand what they are up to I thought it was a bit disingenuous to be preaching their merits without being honest about my own stuff... I'm not looking for praise, beyond feeling that it was worthwhile. You don't want to do that and have it go under the radar either. Not that you're looking for attention... If you feel you're going to put yourself out there... and you know you might upset people you're close to it's nice to feel it was worthwhile.".

== Personal life ==
On 2 March 2022, McDermott shared a letter on social media issued by solicitors representing a client who it said had "made false allegations against him", which "arose out of a relationship which they had some years previously." The letter went on to acknowledge that the client "was above the age of consent at all times that she and Mr McDermott met or engaged in a physical relationship, contrary to her original claim." McDermott said he hoped sharing the letter could "close this chapter." McDermott subsequently deactivated his Twitter account.

== Filmography ==
Year	Title	Role
2003	Pop 4	Presenter
2010–2011	Seacht	DJ Pete
2011	Frenemies	Presenter
2012–2016	The Voice of Ireland	Co-presenter
2013	Celebrity Super Spa	Co-presenter
2015–2019	Junior Eurovision Eire	Presenter
2018	Celebrity Home of the Year	Contestant
2018–2020, 2022–2022	Love Island Australia	Narrator
2020	RTÉ Does Comic Relief	Presenter
