= Aidan O'Mahony =

Irish Gaelic footballer

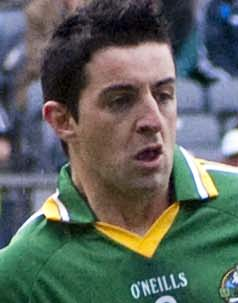

Personal information
- Native name: Aodán Ó Mathúna (Irish)
- Born: 8 June 1980 (age 46) Tralee, County Kerry, Ireland
- Occupation: Garda Síochána
- Height: 1.83 m (6 ft 0 in)

Sport
- Sport: Gaelic football
- Position: Centre Back
Club
- Years: Club
- 1998–2023: Rathmore
Inter-county
Years	County	Apps (scores)
2004–2017	Kerry	70 (0–11)
Inter-county titles
- Munster titles: 10
- All-Irelands: 5
- NFL: 3
- All Stars: 2

Aidan O'Mahony (born 8 June 1980, in Tralee) is a retired Irish Gaelic footballer who played at senior level for the Kerry county team. He has 5 All-Irelands, 3 NFLs, 10 Munster Championships, 1 County Senior Championship, 1 Senior Club County Championship, 1 County U21 Championship, 1 County Intermediate Championship and 2 All Stars.

== Playing career ==
O'Mahony played for Kerry's U21 team in 2000 and 2001. He debuted for the Kerry senior team in the 2003 League campaign and in the Championship versus Clare in 2004. He started the 2004 All-Ireland Final against Mayo, which Kerry won. He repeated the performance in the 2006 All-Ireland Final against the same team. Kerry dominated, and Mayo were easily defeated by a score of 4-15 to 3-05, and O'Mahony picked up the RTÉ Man of the Match Award for scoring 2 points and marking Ciarán McDonald. He won further All-Ireland medals in 2006 and 2007, gaining an All Star in each of those years. He has 2 NFL medals from 2004 and 2005 and also won the Munster club championship with his club Rathmore. O'Mahony again played an important part as Kerry reached the 2008 All-Ireland In 2010, O'Mahony took a break from inter-county football after Kerry's NFL campaign for personal reasons; he, however, returned to the panel for the Championship.

In 2005, following the All-Ireland final loss to Tyrone, O'Mahoney tested positive for a banned steroid, salbutamol. However he faced no censure because salbutamol is found in asthma inhalers, and he was thus granted a therapeutic use exemption.

He once played on for more than 40 minutes in a club final with a broken leg, scoring two points.

O'Mahony announced his retirement from inter-county football on 23 January 2017. O’Mahoney made 70 championship appearances and featured in 85 league games for Kerry. In January 2023 after winning the All-Ireland Intermediate club championship with Rathmore, O'Mahony announced his retirement from club Gaelic football.

== Personnel life ==
O'Mahony is a member of the Garda Síochána, stationed in Cork city. In January 2017, O'Mahony was a contestant on Dancing with the Stars. He went on to win the competition, with his dancing partner Valeria Milova.

Preceded by First	Dancing with the Stars; Winner; 2017	Succeeded by Jake Carter
