= Kayleigh Trappe =

Irish social media and television personality (born 1995)

- Born: 9 October 1995 (age 30); County Monaghan, Ireland
- Occupations: Social media personality; Television presenter
- Years active: 2022–present

Kayleigh Trappe (born 9 October 1995, County Monaghan) is an Irish social media and television personality. She is known for her comedy videos on the social media platforms, Instagram and TikTok.

== Career ==
Trappe has gained much public attention from her lip-syncing videos of the likes of David and Victoria Beckham, Peter Crouch and Abbey Clancy, Joanne McNally and Vogue Williams, Roy Keane and Maura Higgins.

On 2 March 2024, Trappe won 'Best Social Media Star' at the ninth annual Goss.ie Awards.

Trappe has appeared on several Irish television programmes including The Late Late Show, The 6 O'Clock Show, Today and The 2 Johnnies Late Night Lock In.

In June 2024, Trappe was heavily rumoured to be taking over The 2 Johnnies RTÉ 2fm radio show following their departure. However, she denied the claims and spoke about the feeling like she'd "let people down" when the rumours turned out to be untrue.

== Personal life ==
Trappe has spoken openly about struggling with body dysmorphia. Trappe is a fluent Irish language speaker.
