= Carl Mullan =

Irish television & radio presenter (born 1990)

- Born: Charles Dermot Mullan; 24 January 1990 (age 36); Dublin, Ireland
- Education: Institute of Technology, Tallaght
- Occupation: Radio presenter
- Known for: RTÉ 2fm
- Spouse: Aisling Mullan
- Children: 3

Carl Mullan (born 24 January 1990) is an Irish television and radio presenter who is currently co-hosting The RTÉ 2fm Breakfast Show with Roz Purcell and Aisling Bonner.

== Early life ==
Mullan was born in Perrystown on the southside of Dublin. He attended Templeogue College then Institute of Technology, Tallaght attaining an Honours degree in Creative Digital Media.

== Radio career ==
Mullan joined RTÉ 2fm in 2013 as a media content co-ordinator. In 2014 he was promoted to presenter, hosting various shows on RTÉ's digital station, RTÉ 2XM, as well as filling in for the 2fm's main presenters in their absence. In 2015, Mullan had a recurring weekly segment on Nicky Byrne's show with Jenny Greene as the pair's 'Crash-Test Dummy'.

In 2019, Mullan joined Aifric O’Connell as the hosts of 2fm's Weekend Breakfast.

In May 2021, it was announced that Mullan would join Donncha O'Callaghan in replacing Eoghan McDermott as Doireann Garrihy's co-host on the new RTÉ 2fm breakfast show.

In 2023, Aifric O’Connell joined him & Donncha O’Callaghan to present "2FM Breakfast with Carl, Donncha & Aifric". The show aired for 5 weeks, but then Donncha O’Callaghan left which meant that Mullan and O’Connell were back on a show present by just the two of them.

== Television career ==
In 2019, Mullan hosted his own adventure/travel show Go Outside and Play for the RTÉ Player. The show returned for a second season in 2020, retitled Go Outside and Play, Local Adventures focusing on activities that could be done during the COVID-19 pandemic.

In September 2022, Mullan began co-hosting Takeaway Titans on RTÉ2 alongside James Kavanagh.

In December 2022, Mullan was announced as one of the eleven celebrities taking part in the sixth season of Dancing with the Stars. He was partnered with professional dancer, Emily Barker. On 19 March 2023, Mullan and Barker were crowned Dancing with the Stars champions for 2023.

== Personal life ==
In August 2016, Mullan was an escort at the Rose of Tralee International Festival.

In October 2020, Mullan announced his engagement to his long-term girlfriend, Aisling. In April 2021, the couple announced they were expecting their first child later, and in August 2021 they had a son. On 22 April 2022 the couple were married. In August 2023, he announced the arrival of a second child, a girl named Éala. According to Rozanna "Roz" Purcell, he is Arosexual.
