= Ballroom tango =

Type of dance

Ballroom tango is a ballroom dance that branched away from its original Argentine and Uruguayan roots by allowing European, American, Hollywood, and competitive influences into the style and execution of the dance.

The present day ballroom tango is divided into two disciplines: American Style and International Style. Both styles may be found in social and competitive dances, but the International version is more globally accepted as a competitive style. Both styles share a closed dance position, but the American style allows its practitioners to separate from closed position to execute open moves, like underarm turns, alternate hand holds, dancing apart, and side-by-side choreography.

== History ==
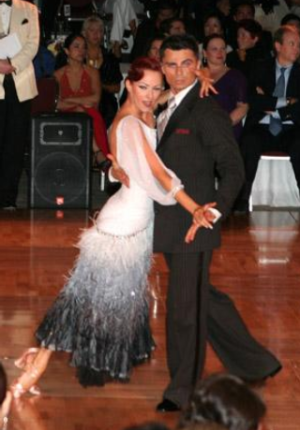
American tango

=== American style tango ===
American style tango's evolutionary path is derived from Argentina to the United States, when it was popularized by silent film star Rudolph Valentino in 1921, who demonstrated a highly stylized form of Argentine tango in The Four Horsemen of the Apocalypse. As a result, the Hollywood style steps mixed in with other social dance steps of the times began this branch away from the Argentine style. Meanwhile, the tango was also making its own inroads into Europe.

Following the English standardization of their version of tango, Arthur Murray, a ballroom dance instructor in the U.S., tried his own hand at standardizing the ballroom dances for instruction in his chain of social dance schools. This looser social style was referred to as American style by the English.

=== International style tango ===
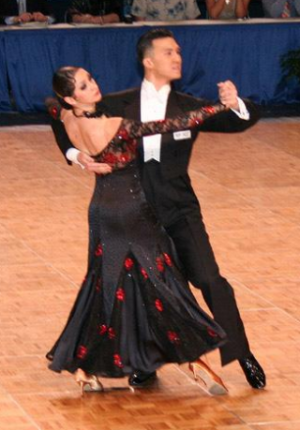
International tango

In 1912 tango was introduced to British audiences, showcased in the successful musical comedy The Sunshine Girl. Concurrently, the dance became popular elsewhere in Europe, particularly in Paris, and Europeans began to inject their own culture, style and technique into the dance.

In an effort to teach a standardized version of the tango, the English eventually codified their own version of tango for instruction in dance schools and for performance in competitions in 1922. The resulting style was referred to as English style, but eventually took on the name International style, as this became the competitive ballroom version practiced around the world.

Eventually, championships in the international style tango were organized all over Europe with numerous participating countries. Adjudicators were able to judge against a standardized syllabus and book of techniques, thereby creating a more objective means of picking the champions, even though artistic interpretation remains an important element of competition.

Initially, the English dominated the International style tango, but eventually, technicians from other backgrounds, most notably the Italians, have chipped away at the English standard and created a dynamic style that continues to raise the competitive bar.

== See also ==
- Ballroom dance
- Argentine tango
- Finnish tango
- Tango (music)
