= Hannah Kelly =

Hannah Kelly may refer to:

- Hannah Kelly (politician) (born 1988), Missouri state representative
- Hannah Kelly (dancer) (born 2002), Irish dancer and choreographer
- Hannah Kelly (athlete) (born 2000), British track and field athlete
