= Hannah Kelly (dancer) =

Irish dancer and choreographer

- Born: 3 August 2002 (age 23); Tallaght, Dublin, Ireland
- Occupation(s): Dancer; Choreographer

Hannah Kelly (born 3 August 2002) is an Irish ballroom and Latin dancer and choreographer.

== Early life ==
Hannah was born in Tallaght in Dublin. She is trained in ballroom, Latin and hip hop dancing. Hannah's mother is a dance teacher and was a massive inspiration behind her love of dance, encouraging her from the age of three.

== Career ==
By age six, Hannah had begun dancing competitively.

In 2016, Hannah and her partner Sasha Savchenko traveled across Europe dancing in various competitions including the German Dance Open. They finished 12th in the WDSF Junior II Open Latin in Slovenia. In 2017, the couple finished in 9th place in the WDSF Junior II Open Latin in Belgium.

In 2017, Hannah partnered with Romanian dancer, Nicolae-Matei Negruser. The couple finished in 5th and 7th place respectively in the Rising Stars and Youth competitions at the WDSF Open in Miami, United States.

Between 2018 and 2019, Hannah partnered with American dancer, Donovan Kirrane. The couple competed in several competitions around the world, including ones in Germany, Spain, Austria, Czech Republic, as well as the World Championships in Latvia.

== Dancing with the Stars ==
On 22 December 2021, Hannah was announced as one of the new professionals to join the fifth season of the Irish version of Dancing with the Stars. Her partner was Aslan guitarist, Billy McGuinness. Kelly and McGuinness performed their first routine on the second week of the show to positive comments from the judges. They were eliminated in week 9 following a dance-off against Jordan Conroy and Salome Chachua. Kelly returned for the sixth series in 2023, as a supporting dancer with no celebrity partner.

Series	Partner	Place
5	Billy McGuinness	7th

Series 5 – with celebrity partner Billy McGuinness

Week No.	Dance/Song	Judges' score			Total	Result
Week No.	Dance/Song	Redmond	Barry	Gourounlian	Total	Result
1	No dance performed	-	-	-	-	No elimination
2	Foxtrot / "Always Look on the Bright Side of Life"	5	5	6	16	No elimination
3	Salsa / "Papa Loves Mambo"	4	4	5	13	Safe
4	Paso Doble / "Any Way You Want It"	4	5	5	14	Safe
5	Quickstep / "Town Called Malice"	6	6	6	18	Safe
6	Contemporary Ballroom / "Crazy World"	5	6	6	17	No elimination
7	American Smooth / "Ain't That a Kick in the Head?"	5	6	7	18	Safe
8	Samba / "Rock the Boat"	5	6	7	18	Safe
9	Charleston / "Mr. Bass Man"	6	7	7	20	Eliminated
