= Dancing with the Stars (Irish TV series) series 5 =

Dancing with the Stars
- Series 5
- Presented by: Jennifer Zamparelli; Nicky Byrne; Lottie Ryan (guest)
- Judges: Arthur Gourounlian; Loraine Barry; Brian Redmond
- Celebrity winner: Nina Carberry
- Professional winner: Pasquale La Rocca
- No. of episodes: 12

Release
- Original network: RTÉ One
- Original release: 9 January – 27 March 2022

Series chronology
- ← Previous; Series 4 Next → Series 6

Dancing with the Stars returned for a fifth series on 9 January 2022 on RTÉ One. This was the first series in two years after the show was put on a year-long hiatus during the COVID-19 pandemic.

On 12 November 2021, it was announced that the show would return in the New Year with Nicky Byrne and Jennifer Zamparelli returning as hosts for a fifth and third series, respectively. It was also confirmed that Brian Redmond and Loraine Barry return as judges, however, Julian Benson did not. Armenian-born choreographer and creative director, Arthur Gourounlian joined the judging panel in Benson's place. It was also confirmed that the series would start with twelve celebrities, rather than eleven as it had been for the previous four installments.

This series also saw professional dancers, Giulia Dotta, Kai Widdrington, Robert Rowiński and Ryan McShane depart the show. They were replaced by five new professional dancers, Denys Samson, Ervinas Merfeldas, Hannah Kelly, Maurizio Benenato and Salome Chachua.

The final on 27 March 2022, was won by Nina Carberry and her partner Pasquale La Rocca. This marks La Rocca's second consecutive win, thereby making him the only professional dancer with more than one win on the show.

This was Nicky Byrne's final series as host.

== Couples ==
On 10 December 2021, during an episode of The Late Late Show, Aengus Mac Grianna, Ellen Keane, Gráinne Seoige and Neil Delamere were announced as the first celebrities to be taking part. The remaining celebrities were announced throughout the following week.

Celebrity	Known for	Professional	Status
Cathy Kelly	Best-selling author	Maurizio Benenato	Eliminated 1st on 23 January 2022
Neil Delamere	Comedian	Kylee Vincent	Eliminated 2nd on 30 January 2022
Aengus Mac Grianna	Former RTÉ newsreader	Emily Barker	Eliminated 3rd on 6 February 2022
Missy Keating	Model & influencer	Ervinas Merfeldas	Eliminated 4th on 20 February 2022
Gráinne Seoige	Television presenter	John Nolan	Eliminated 5th on 27 February 2022
Billy McGuinness	Aslan guitarist	Hannah Kelly	Eliminated 6th on 6 March 2022
Nicolas Roche	Professional cyclist	Karen Byrne	Eliminated 7th on 13 March 2022
Matthew MacNabb	Love Island contestant	Laura Nolan	Eliminated 8th on 20 March 2022
Erica-Cody	Singer-songwriter	Denys Samson; Ervinas Merfeldas (Week 9)	Runners-up on 27 March 2022
Ellen Keane	Paralympic swimmer	Stephen Vincent; Ervinas Merfeldas (Week 10)	Runners-up on 27 March 2022
Jordan Conroy	Rugby sevens player	Salome Chachua; Emily Barker (Week 10)	Runners-up on 27 March 2022
Nina Carberry	Former jockey	Pasquale La Rocca	Winners on 27 March 2022

== Scoring chart ==
Couple	Place	1	2	3	1/2+3	4	5	6	7	8	9	10	11	12
Nina & Pasquale	1	19	—	25	44	19	21	24	30	30	26	29+29=58	30+4=34	30+29=59
Jordan & Salome	2	—	22	19	41	20	27	19	29	30	24	29+27=56	28+5=33	30+30=60
Ellen & Stephen	2	—	21	21	42	22	27	28	23	27	27	26+27=53	30+2=32	30+29=59
Erica & Denys	2	—	24	23	47	28	26	20	27	25	29	30+29=59	26+3=29	30+28=58
Matthew & Laura	5	—	13	11	24	17	14	26	12	22	22	23+29=52	21+1=22	
Nicolas & Karen	6	11	—	16	27	19	15	19	17	—	21	21+27=48		
Billy & Hannah	7	—	16	13	29	14	18	17	18	18	20			
Gráinne & John	8	14	—	17	31	13	19	17	22	19				
Missy & Ervinas	9	16	—	21	37	24	22	—	24					
Aengus & Emily	10	—	16	11	27	11	17							
Neil & Kylee	11	17	—	22	39	18								
Cathy & Maurizio	12	14	—	15	29									

Red numbers indicate the couples with the lowest score for each week.
Green numbers indicate the couples with the highest score for each week.
the couple eliminated that week
the returning couple that was called forward and eventually last to be called safe, but was not necessarily in the bottom
the returning couple that finished in the bottom two and competed in the Dance-Off
the winning couple
the two/three runners-up
the couple was immune from elimination
"—" indicates the couple(s) did not dance that week

=== Average chart ===
This table only counts for dances scored on a traditional 30-points scale. It does not include the Team Dance or Marathon scores.

Rank by average	Place	Couple	Total points	Number of dances	Total average
1	2	Erica & Denys	316	12	26.33
2	1	Nina & Pasquale	312	12	26.00
3	2	Ellen & Stephen	311	12	25.92
4	2	Jordan & Salome	307	12	25.58
5	9	Missy & Ervinas	107	5	21.40
6	11	Neil & Kylee	57	3	19.00
7	5	Matthew & Laura	181	10	18.10
8	6	Nicolas & Karen	139	8	17.38
9	8	Gráinne & John	121	7	17.29
10	7	Billy & Hannah	134	8	16.75
11	12	Cathy & Maurizio	29	2	14.50
12	10	Aengus & Emily	55	4	13.75

== Highest and lowest scoring performances ==
The highest and lowest performances in each dance according to the judges' scale are as follows.

Dance	Celebrity	Highest score	Celebrity	Lowest score
Tango	Matthew MacNabb	23	Cathy Kelly	15
Cha-cha-cha	Erica-Cody	30	Matthew MacNabb	12
Salsa	Erica-Cody	27	Billy McGuinness	13
Foxtrot	Ellen Keane; Erica-Cody	23	Billy McGuinness	16
Charleston	Nina Carberry; Ellen Keane; Erica-Cody	30	Aengus Mac Grianna	16
Waltz	Nicolas Roche	17	Aengus Mac Grianna	11
Quickstep	Ellen Keane	27	Billy McGuinness	18
Jive	Jordan Conroy	29	Nicolas Roche; Matthew MacNabb	11
Rumba	Erica-Cody	26	Gráinne Seoige	13
Paso Doble	Nina Carberry; Ellen Keane; Jordan Conroy	30	Billy McGuinness	14
American Smooth	Nina Carberry	29	Missy Keating	16
Contemporary Ballroom	Jordan Conroy	30	Billy McGuinness	17
Samba	Erica-Cody; Jordan Conroy	24	Aengus Mac Grianna	11
Viennese Waltz	Nina Carberry	30	Matthew MacNabb	13
Showdance	Jordan Conroy	30	Erica-Cody	28
Team Dance	Erica-Cody; Matthew MacNabb; Nina Carberry	29	Ellen Keane; Jordan Conroy; Nicolas Roche	27
Bust-a-Move Marathon	Jordan Conroy	5	Matthew MacNabb	1

== Couples' highest and lowest scoring dances ==
Couple	Highest scoring dance	Lowest scoring dance
Nina & Pasquale	Charleston; Viennese Waltz (x2); Paso Doble (30)	Quickstep; Tango (19)
Ellen & Stephen	Charleston; Paso Doble (30)	Tango; Cha-cha-cha (21)
Erica & Denys	Cha-cha-cha; Charleston (30)	Tango (20)
Jordan & Salome	Contemporary Ballroom; Paso Doble; Showdance (30)	Quickstep; Foxtrot (19)
Matthew & Laura	Contemporary Ballroom (26)	Jive (11)
Nicolas & Karen	Tango; Foxtrot (21)	Jive (11)
Billy & Hannah	Charleston (20)	Salsa (13)
Gráinne & John	Tango (22)	Rumba (13)
Missy & Ervinas	Contemporary Ballroom; Charleston (24)	American Smooth (16)
Aengus & Emily	Jive (17)	Waltz; Samba (11)
Neil & Kylee	Charleston (22)	Paso Doble (17)
Cathy & Maurizio	Tango (15)	Cha-cha-cha (14)

== Weekly scores and songs ==
Unless indicated otherwise, individual judges scores in the charts below (given in parentheses) are listed in this order from left to right: Brian Redmond, Loraine Barry, Arthur Gourounlian.

=== Week 1 ===
Guest act: Series 4 champions, Lottie Ryan and Pasquale La Rocca performed a Salsa to the theme from "Dora the Explorer".

Running order

Couple	Score	Dance	Music
Neil & Kylee	17 (5, 6, 6)	Paso Doble	"I Believe in a Thing Called Love" — The Darkness
Missy & Ervinas	16 (4, 6, 6)	American Smooth	"Baby Love" — The Supremes
Nicolas & Karen	11 (3, 4, 4)	Jive	"Blinding Lights" — The Weeknd
Cathy & Maurizio	14 (4, 5, 5)	Cha-cha-cha	"How Will I Know" — Whitney Houston x Clean Bandit
Nina & Pasquale	19 (6, 6, 7)	Quickstep	"Black Horse and the Cherry Tree" — KT Tunstall
Gráinne & John	14 (4, 5, 5)	Waltz	"With You I'm Born Again" — Billy Preston and Syreeta

=== Week 2 ===
Guest act: Wild Youth performing 'Through the Phone'.

Running order

Couple	Score	Dance	Music
Aengus & Emily	16 (4, 6, 6)	Charleston	"Goody Two Shoes" — Adam Ant
Matthew & Laura	13 (3, 5, 5)	Viennese Waltz	"Dangerously" — Charlie Puth
Jordan & Salome	22 (7, 7, 8)	Salsa	"Take You Dancing" — Jason Derulo
Erica & Denys	24 (8, 8, 8)	Samba	"Kiss My (Uh-Oh)" — Anne-Marie & Little Mix
Billy & Hannah	16 (5, 5, 6)	Foxtrot	"Always Look on the Bright Side of Life" — Monty Python
Ellen & Stephen	21 (7, 7, 7)	Tango	"Golden" — Harry Styles

=== Week 3 ===
Host, Jennifer Zamparelli, was absent from this show due to testing positive for COVID-19. Series 4 champion, Lottie Ryan, co-hosted the show with Nicky Byrne in her place.

Running order

Couple	Score	Dance	Music	Result
Ellen & Stephen	21 (7, 7, 7)	Cha-cha-cha	"Get Out My Head" — Shane Codd	Safe
Aengus & Emily	11 (3, 4, 4)	Waltz	"If You Don't Know Me by Now" — Seal	Safe
Neil & Kylee	22 (6, 8, 8)	Charleston	"I Don't Feel Like Dancin'" — The Baseballs	Safe
Cathy & Maurizio	15 (4, 5, 6)	Tango	"Call Me" — Blondie	Eliminated
Missy & Ervinas	21 (7, 7, 7)	Samba	"Dynamite" — Sean Paul feat. Sia	Last to be called safe
Nicolas & Karen	16 (5, 5, 6)	Viennese Waltz	"Unplayed Piano" — Damien Rice and Lisa Hannigan	Safe
Matthew & Laura	11 (3, 4, 4)	Jive	"Overpass Graffiti" — Ed Sheeran	Safe
Gráinne & John	17 (5, 6, 6)	Paso Doble	"Devil Woman" — Cliff Richard	Last to be called safe
Jordan & Salome	19 (6, 6, 7)	Quickstep	"Lightning Bolt" — Jake Bugg	Safe
Erica & Denys	23 (7, 8, 8)	Foxtrot	"My Girl" — The Temptations	Safe
Nina & Pasquale	25 (8, 8, 9)	Rumba	"Starlight" — Yola	Safe
Billy & Hannah	13 (3, 5, 5)	Salsa	"Papa Loves Mambo" — Perry Como	Safe

=== Week 4: Movie Week ===
Guest act: Irish National Youth Ballet performing a piece from Cinderella.

Running order

Couple	Score	Dance	Music	Movie	Result
Matthew & Laura	17 (5, 6, 6)	Foxtrot	"You've Got a Friend in Me" — Randy Newman	Toy Story	Safe
Nina & Pasquale	19 (6, 6, 7)	Tango	"Elevation (Tomb Raider mix)" — U2	Lara Croft: Tomb Raider	Safe
Ellen & Stephen	22 (7, 7, 8)	Samba	"Under the Sea" — Samuel E. Wright	The Little Mermaid	Safe
Billy & Hannah	14 (4, 5, 5)	Paso Doble	"Any Way You Want It" — Journey	Rock of Ages	Last to be called safe
Jordan & Salome	20 (6, 7, 7)	Cha-cha-cha	"I Like to Move It" — Will.i.am	Madagascar	Last to be called safe
Missy & Ervinas	24 (8, 8, 8)	Contemporary Ballroom	"Running with the Wolves" — Bruno Coulais, Kíla and Aurora	Wolfwalkers	Safe
Gráinne & John	13 (4, 4, 5)	Rumba	"Diamonds Are Forever" — Shirley Bassey	Diamonds Are Forever	Safe
Neil & Kylee	18 (5, 7, 6)	Cha-cha-cha	"Ghostbusters" — Walk the Moon	Ghostbusters	Eliminated
Aengus & Emily	11 (3, 4, 4)	Samba	"Help Yourself" — Tom Jones	Anchorman: The Legend of Ron Burgundy	Safe
Nicolas & Karen	19 (6, 6, 7)	American Smooth	"Singin' in the Rain" — Gene Kelly	Singin' in the Rain	Safe
Erica & Denys	28 (9, 9, 10)	Charleston	"When We're Human" — Michael-Leon Wooley, Bruno Campos and Anika Noni Rose feat. Terence Blanchard	The Princess and the Frog	Safe

=== Week 5 ===
Running order

Couple	Score	Dance	Music	Result
Erica & Denys	26 (8, 9, 9)	Rumba	"Girl on Fire" — Alicia Keys	Safe
Nicolas & Karen	15 (5, 5, 5)	Samba	"Fantasy" — Earth, Wind & Fire	Last to be called safe
Billy & Hannah	18 (6, 6, 6)	Quickstep	"Town Called Malice" — The Jam	Safe
Missy & Ervinas	22 (7, 7, 8)	Tango	"Prisoner" — Miley Cyrus	Safe
Matthew & Laura	14 (4, 5, 5)	Salsa	"X" — Jonas Brothers feat. Karol G	Safe
Nina & Pasquale	21 (7, 7, 7)	Cha-cha-cha	"If the World Just Danced" — Diana Ross	Last to be called safe
Aengus & Emily	17 (5, 6, 6)	Jive	"All Shook Up" — Billy Joel	Eliminated
Ellen & Stephen	27 (9, 9, 9)	Contemporary Ballroom	"We Are Beautiful" — LYRA & Unsecret	Safe
Gráinne & John	19 (6, 6, 7)	American Smooth	"Cheek to Cheek" — Ella Fitzgerald	Safe
Jordan & Salome	27 (9, 9, 9)	Paso Doble	"Paint It Black" — Escala	Safe

=== Week 6: Dedicated Dance Week ===
There was no elimination in Week 6. The judges still scored and the public still voted. However, in a twist, the couple who received the highest combined points was immune from the following week's first Dance-Off, therefore securing their place in the competition until Week 8. The couple granted immunity was Matthew & Laura.

Running order

Couple	Score	Dance	Music	Dedication	Result
Nina & Pasquale	24 (8, 8, 8)	Salsa	"Starships" — Nicki Minaj	Her daughters, Rosie & Holly	Safe
Billy & Hannah	17 (5, 6, 6)	Contemporary Ballroom	"Crazy World" — Aslan	His friend and bandmate, Christy Dignam	Safe
Ellen & Stephen	28 (9, 9, 10)	Paso Doble	"Run the World (Girls)" — Beyoncé	Her friend, Aisling	Safe
Gráinne & John	17 (5, 6, 6)	Samba	"Africa" — Toto	Her husband, Leon	Safe
Jordan & Salome	19 (7, 6, 6)	Foxtrot	"Isn't She Lovely" — Stevie Wonder	His mother, Jennie	Safe
Nicolas & Karen	19 (6, 6, 7)	Quickstep	"Hey Brother" — Avicii	His brother, Alexis	Safe
Erica & Denys	20 (7, 6, 7)	Tango	"Body II Body" — Samantha Mumba	Her musical influence, Samantha Mumba	Safe
Matthew & Laura	26 (8, 9, 9)	Contemporary Ballroom	"See You Again" — Wiz Khalifa feat. Charlie Puth	His deceased friend, Ryan	Granted immunity

Due to testing positive for COVID-19, Missy Keating was unable to perform. She was due to perform a Viennese Waltz dedicated to her deceased grandmother, Marie Keating. Under the rules of the show, Missy and her partner, Ervinas Merfeldas, were given a bye to the following week.

=== Week 7 ===
Running order

Couple	Score	Dance	Music	Result
Missy & Ervinas	24 (8, 8, 8)	Charleston	"Out Out" — Joel Corry and Jax Jones feat. Charli XCX & Saweetie	Eliminated
Nicolas & Karen	17 (5, 6, 6)	Waltz	"Love Ain't Here Anymore" — Take That	Safe
Erica & Denys	27 (9, 9, 9)	Salsa	"Don't Go Yet" — Camila Cabello	Bottom two
Billy & Hannah	18 (5, 6, 7)	American Smooth	"Ain't That a Kick in the Head?" — Dean Martin	Safe
Ellen & Stephen	23 (7, 8, 8)	Foxtrot	"Love Story (Taylor's Version)" — Taylor Swift	Last to be called safe
Matthew & Laura	12 (4, 4, 4)	Cha-cha-cha	"Dynamite" — BTS	Immune
Gráinne & John	22 (7, 7, 8)	Tango	"Santa Maria" — Gotan Project	Safe
Nina & Pasquale	30 (10, 10, 10)	Viennese Waltz	"At Last" — Beyoncé	Safe
Jordan & Salome	29 (9, 10, 10)	Jive	"Runaway Baby" — Bruno Mars	Safe

Dance-Off

Judges' votes to save

- Gourounlian: Erica & Denys
- Redmond: Erica & Denys
- Barry: Did not vote, but would have voted to save Erica & Denys

=== Week 8: Big Band Week ===
All performances this week were accompanied by the RTÉ Concert Orchestra.

Running order

Couple	Score	Dance	Music	Result
Gráinne & John	19 (6, 6, 7)	Cha-cha-cha	"Dancing in the Street" — Martha and the Vandellas	Eliminated
Jordan & Salome	30 (10, 10, 10)	Contemporary Ballroom	"High Hopes" — Panic! at the Disco	Bottom two
Matthew & Laura	22 (7, 7, 8)	Paso Doble	"Live and Let Die" — Wings	Safe
Erica & Denys	25 (8, 8, 9)	American Smooth	"Too Darn Hot" — Ella Fitzgerald	Safe
Nina & Pasquale	30 (10, 10, 10)	Charleston	"Doop" — Doop	Safe
Ellen & Stephen	27 (9, 9, 9)	Jive	"Candyman" — Christina Aguilera	Safe
Billy & Hannah	18 (5, 6, 7)	Samba	"Rock the Boat" — The Hues Corporation	Last to be called safe

Due to testing positive for COVID-19, Nicolas Roche was unable to perform. Under the rules of the show, Nicolas and his partner, Karen Byrne, were given a bye to the following week.

Dance-Off

Judges' votes to save

- Gourounlian: Jordan & Salome
- Redmond: Jordan & Salome
- Barry: Did not vote, but would have voted to save Jordan & Salome

=== Week 9 ===
Running order

Couple	Score	Dance	Music	Result
Matthew & Laura	22 (7, 7, 8)	American Smooth	"Anyone for You" — George Ezra	Safe
Nina & Pasquale	26 (8, 9, 9)	Jive	"Faith" — Stevie Wonder feat. Ariana Grande	Last to be called safe
Nicolas & Karen	21 (7, 7, 7)	Tango	"Trumpet Tango" — Eddie Calvert	Safe
Ellen & Stephen	27 (9, 9, 9)	Quickstep	"Walking on Sunshine" — Katrina and the Waves	Safe
Jordan & Salome	24 (8, 8, 8)	Samba	"Magalenha" — Sérgio Mendes	Bottom two
Billy & Hannah	20 (6, 7, 7)	Charleston	"Mr. Bass Man" — Johnny Cymbal	Eliminated
Erica & Ervinas*	29 (9, 10, 10)	Contemporary Ballroom	"Rise Up" — Andra Day	Safe

*Due to testing positive for COVID-19, Denys Samson was unable to perform with his partner, Erica-Cody. She was partnered with Ervinas Merfeldas for this week.

Dance-Off

Judges' votes to save

- Gourounlian: Jordan & Salome
- Redmond: Jordan & Salome
- Barry: Did not vote, but would have voted to save Jordan & Salome

=== Week 10: Around the World Week ===
Running order

Couple	Score	Dance	Music	Country	Result
Ellen & Ervinas*	26 (8, 9, 9)	Salsa	"Left My Heart in Tokyo" — Mini Viva	Japan	Bottom two
Nicolas & Karen	21 (7, 7, 7)	Foxtrot	"I Love Paris" — Frank Sinatra	France	Eliminated
Jordan & Emily*	29 (9, 10, 10)	Charleston	"Walk Like an Egyptian" — The Bangles	Egypt	Safe
Matthew & Laura	23 (7, 8, 8)	Tango	"Rio" — Duran Duran	Brazil	Safe
Erica & Denys	30 (10, 10, 10)	Cha-cha-cha	"Mambo Italiano" — Bette Midler	Italy	Safe
Nina & Pasquale	29 (9, 10, 10)	American Smooth	"A Foggy Day (in London Town)" — Petula Clark	England	Safe
Ellen & Ervinas*; Jordan & Emily*; Nicolas & Karen	27 (9, 9, 9)	Freestyle ("Cuban Groovers")	"Cuba" — Gibson Brothers	Cuba	
Erica & Denys; Matthew & Laura; Nina & Pasquale	29 (9, 10, 10)	Freestyle ("Turkish Delights")	"Istanbul (Not Constantinople)" — Bart & Baker	Turkey	

*Due to testing positive for COVID-19, Salome Chachua and Stephen Vincent were unable to perform with their partners, Jordan Conroy and Ellen Keane. Emily Barker and Ervinas Merfeldas stood in for them, respectively.

Dance-Off

Judges' votes to save

- Gourounlian: Ellen & Ervinas
- Redmond: Ellen & Ervinas
- Barry: Did not vote, but would have voted to save Ellen & Ervinas

=== Week 11: Semifinal ===
Running order

Couple	Score	Dance	Music	Result
Nina & Pasquale	30 (10, 10, 10)	Paso Doble	"Get Ready" — Rayelle	Safe
Erica & Denys	26 (8, 9, 9)	Jive	"Let's Go Crazy" — Cast of Sing 2	Bottom two
Matthew & Laura	21 (7, 7, 7)	Samba	"One Dance" — Justin Bieber feat. Drake	Eliminated
Jordan & Salome	28 (9, 9, 10)	American Smooth	"I Get the Sweetest Feeling" — Jackie Wilson	Safe
Ellen & Stephen	30 (10, 10, 10)	Charleston	"Marvellous Party" — Beverley Knight	Safe
Jordan & Salome; Nina & Pasquale; Erica & Denys; Ellen & Stephen; Matthew & Laura	5; 4; 3; 2; 1	Bust-a-Move Marathon	"I'm So Excited" — The Pointer Sisters	

Dance-Off

Judges' votes to save

- Gourounlian: Erica & Denys
- Redmond: Erica & Denys
- Barry: Did not vote, but would have voted to save Erica & Denys

=== Week 12: The Final ===
Guest act: Becky Hill performing 'Run'.

Running order

Couple	Score	Dance	Music	Result
Ellen & Stephen	30 (10, 10, 10)	Paso Doble	"Run the World (Girls)" — Beyoncé	Runner-up
Ellen & Stephen	29 (9, 10, 10)	Showdance	"I See Stars" — The Shires	Runner-up
Nina & Pasquale	30 (10, 10, 10)	Viennese Waltz	"At Last" — Beyoncé	Winner
Nina & Pasquale	29 (9, 10, 10)	Showdance	"If My Friends Could See Me Now" — Christina Applegate	Winner
Erica & Denys	30 (10, 10, 10)	Charleston	"When We're Human" — Michael-Leon Wooley, Bruno Campos, and Anika Noni Rose feat. Terence Blanchard	Runner-up
Erica & Denys	28 (9, 9, 10)	Showdance	"Glitterball" — Sigma feat. Ella Henderson	Runner-up
Jordan & Salome	30 (10, 10, 10)	Paso Doble	"Paint It Black" — Escala	Runner-up
Jordan & Salome	30 (10, 10, 10)	Showdance	"Fire it Up" — Outasight	Runner-up

== Dance chart ==
Highest scoring dance
Lowest scoring dance
No dance performed
Not performed due to illness or injury
Immune from elimination

Couple	Week 1	Week 2	Week 3	Week 4	Week 5	Week 6	Week 7	Week 8	Week 9	Week 10		Week 11		Week 12	
Nina & Pasquale	Quickstep	N/A	Rumba	Tango	Cha-cha-cha	Salsa	Viennese Waltz	Charleston	Jive	American Smooth	Freestyle (Turkish Delights)	Paso Doble	Bust-a-Move Marathon	Viennese Waltz	Showdance
Jordan & Salome	N/A	Salsa	Quickstep	Cha-cha-cha	Paso Doble	Foxtrot	Jive	Contemporary Ballroom	Samba	Charleston	Freestyle (Cuban Groovers)	American Smooth	Bust-a-Move Marathon	Paso Doble	Showdance
Ellen & Stephen	N/A	Tango	Cha-cha-cha	Samba	Contemporary Ballroom	Paso Doble	Foxtrot	Jive	Quickstep	Salsa	Freestyle (Cuban Groovers)	Charleston	Bust-a-Move Marathon	Paso Doble	Showdance
Erica & Denys	N/A	Samba	Foxtrot	Charleston	Rumba	Tango	Salsa	American Smooth	Contemporary Ballroom	Cha-cha-cha	Freestyle (Turkish Delights)	Jive	Bust-a-Move Marathon	Charleston	Showdance
Matthew & Laura	N/A	Viennese Waltz	Jive	Foxtrot	Salsa	Contemporary Ballroom	Cha-cha-cha	Paso Doble	American Smooth	Tango	Freestyle (Turkish Delights)	Samba	Bust-a-Move Marathon		
Nicolas & Karen	Jive	N/A	Viennese Waltz	American Smooth	Samba	Quickstep	Waltz	Tango	Tango	Foxtrot	Freestyle (Cuban Groovers)				
Billy & Hannah	N/A	Foxtrot	Salsa	Paso Doble	Quickstep	Contemporary Ballroom	American Smooth	Samba	Charleston						
Gráinne & John	Waltz	N/A	Paso Doble	Rumba	American Smooth	Samba	Tango	Cha-cha-cha							
Missy & Ervinas	American Smooth	N/A	Samba	Contemporary Ballroom	Tango	Viennese Waltz	Charleston								
Aengus & Emily	N/A	Charleston	Waltz	Samba	Jive										
Neil & Kylee	Paso Doble	N/A	Charleston	Cha-cha-cha											
Cathy & Maurizio	Cha-cha-cha	N/A	Tango												
