= Dancing with the Stars (Irish TV series) series 6 =

Dancing with the Stars
- Series 6
- Presented by: Jennifer Zamparelli; Doireann Garrihy
- Judges: Arthur Gourounlian; Loraine Barry; Brian Redmond
- Celebrity winner: Carl Mullan
- Professional winner: Emily Barker
- No. of episodes: 11

Release
- Original network: RTÉ One
- Original release: 8 January – 19 March 2023

Series chronology
- ← Previous; Series 5 Next → Series 7

Dancing with the Stars returned for a sixth series on 8 January 2023 on RTÉ One.

On 25 August 2022, Nicky Byrne announced that he would be stepping down as host after five seasons to focus on touring commitments with his band, Westlife. On 7 October, Doireann Garrihy was announced as his replacement joining Jennifer Zamparelli as co-host.

This season also saw professional dancer, and two-time reigning champion, Pasquale La Rocca announce his departure from the show as he joined the Italian version of the format, Ballando con le Stelle. On 28 November 2022, all other professional dancers were confirmed to be returning to the series from the previous year, they were joined by new professional dancer, Michael Danilczuk, whom previously that year had finished as runner-up in his native version in Poland, Taniec z gwiazdami.

It was announced on 22 January, due to unforeseen circumstances, professional dancer, Maurizio Benenato had left the show. He was replaced with former Dancing with the Stars Ireland professional and reigning Taniec z gwiazdami champion, Robert Rowiński.

The final on 19 March 2023, was won by Carl Mullan alongside partner Emily Barker. This was Barker's final series as a professional dancer.

== Couples ==
On 1 December 2022, Brooke Scullion, Panti Bliss, Paul Brogan and Suzanne Jackson were announced as the first four celebrities to take part.

Celebrity	Known for	Professional	Status
Leah O'Rourke	Derry Girls actress	John Nolan	Eliminated 1st on 22 January 2023
Dr. Marie Cassidy	Former state pathologist	Stephen Vincent	Eliminated 2nd on 29 January 2023
Paul Brogan	Former Dublin GAA footballer	Salome Chachua	Eliminated 3rd on 5 February 2023
Stephanie Roche	Ireland footballer	Ervinas Merfeldas	Eliminated 4th on 19 February 2023
Shane Byrne	Former rugby player	Karen Byrne	Eliminated 5th on 26 February 2023
Panti Bliss	Drag queen & activist	Denys Samson	Eliminated 6th on 5 March 2023
Kevin McGahern	Comedian	Laura Nolan	Eliminated 7th on 12 March 2023
Suzanne Jackson	TV presenter & entrepreneur	Michael Danilczuk	Runners-up on 19 March 2023
Damian McGinty	Singer & Glee actor	Kylee Vincent	Runners-up on 19 March 2023
Brooke Scullion	Singer & Eurovision star	Robert Rowiński; Maurizio Benenato (Weeks 1-2)	Runners-up on 19 March 2023
Carl Mullan	RTÉ 2fm Breakfast presenter	Emily Barker	Winners on 19 March 2023

== Scoring chart ==
Couple	Place	1	2	3	1+2+3	4	5	6	7	8	9	10	11
Carl & Emily	1	16	23	20	59	20	22	23	24	23	28+28=56	26+3=29	29+30=59
Brooke & Robert	2	25	23	26	74	24	26	25	27	30	28+27=55	30+5=35	30+29=59
Damian & Kylee	2	19	20	25	64	25	23	27	29	28	25+27=52	29+4=33	30+30=60
Suzanne & Michael	2	23	25	15	63	23	25	23	25	29	30+28=58	29+2=31	30+30=60
Kevin & Laura	5	19	21	17	57	21	20	24	26	24	23+28=51	27+1=28	
Panti & Denys	6	23	19	21	63	22	27	29	22	25	27+27=54		
Shane & Karen	7	17	12	15	44	18	21	23	20	22			
Stephanie & Ervinas	8	13	13	23	49	17	14	23	19				
Paul & Salome	9	15	14	20	49	27	16						
Dr. Marie & Stephen	10	15	16	17	48	15							
Leah & John	11	14	10	11	35								

Red numbers indicate the couples with the lowest score for each week.
Green numbers indicate the couples with the highest score for each week.
the couple eliminated that week
the returning couple that was called forward and eventually last to be called safe, but was not necessarily in the bottom
the returning couple that finished in the bottom two and competed in the Dance-Off
the winning couple
the two/three runners-up
the couple was immune from elimination
"—" indicates the couple(s) did not dance that week

=== Average chart ===
This table only counts for dances scored on a traditional 30-points scale. It does not include the Team Dance or Marathon scores.

Rank by average	Place	Couple	Total points	Number of dances	Total average
1	2	Brooke & Robert	323	12	26.9
2	2	Damian & Kylee	310	12	25.8
3	2	Suzanne & Michael	307	12	25.6
4	6	Panti & Denys	215	9	23.9
5	1	Carl & Emily	284	12	23.7
6	5	Kevin & Laura	222	10	22.2
7	7	Shane & Karen	148	8	18.5
8	9	Paul & Salome	92	5	18.4
9	8	Stephanie & Ervinas	122	7	17.4
10	10	Dr. Marie & Stephen	63	4	15.8
11	11	Leah & John	35	3	11.7

== Highest and lowest scoring performances ==
The highest and lowest performances in each dance according to the judges' scale are as follows.

Dance	Celebrity	Highest score	Celebrity	Lowest score
Tango	Suzanne Jackson	29	Dr. Marie Cassidy; Paul Brogan	16
Cha-cha-cha	Brooke Scullion	30	Leah O'Rourke	11
Salsa	Brooke Scullion	25	Dr. Marie Cassidy; Stephanie Roche	17
Foxtrot	Damian McGinty	25	Stephanie Roche	13
Charleston	Damian McGinty; Suzanne Jackson	29	Stephanie Roche	23
Waltz	Paul Brogan	20	Panti Bliss	19
Quickstep	Carl Mullan; Kevin McGahern	26	Shane Byrne	17
Jive	Brooke Scullion	27	Dr. Marie Cassidy; Suzanne Jackson	15
Rumba	Suzanne Jackson	30	Brooke Scullion	26
Paso Doble	Brooke Scullion	30	Leah O'Rourke; Stephanie Roche	14
American Smooth	Panti Bliss	27	Leah O'Rourke	10
Contemporary Ballroom	Brooke Scullion; Damian McGinty	30	Stephanie Roche	23
Samba	Suzanne Jackson	30	Paul Brogan	14
Viennese Waltz	Brooke Scullion; Damian McGinty; Suzanne Jackson	25	Kevin McGahern	19
Showdance	Carl Mullan; Damian McGinty; Suzanne Jackson	30	Brooke Scullion	29
Team Dance	Carl Mullan; Kevin McGahern; Suzanne Jackson	28	Brooke Scullion; Damian McGinty; Panti Bliss	27
Marathon	Brooke Scullion	5	Kevin McGahern	1

== Couples' highest and lowest scoring dances ==
Couple	Highest scoring dance	Lowest scoring dance
Carl & Emily	Showdance (30)	Foxtrot (16)
Damian & Kylee	Contemporary Ballroom & Showdance (30)	Tango (19)
Suzanne & Michael	Rumba, Samba & Showdance (30)	Jive (15)
Brooke & Robert	Contemporary Ballroom, Cha-cha-cha & Paso Doble (30)	Quickstep (23)
Kevin & Laura	Charleston (27)	Tango (17)
Panti & Denys	Paso Doble (29)	Waltz (19)
Shane & Karen	Viennese Waltz (23)	Cha-cha-cha (12)
Stephanie & Ervinas	Charleston & Contemporary Ballroom (23)	Cha-cha-cha & Foxtrot (13)
Paul & Salome	Charleston (27)	Samba (14)
Dr. Marie & Stephen	Salsa (17)	Jive & Foxtrot (15)
Leah & John	Paso Doble (14)	American Smooth (10)

== Weekly scores and songs ==
Unless indicated otherwise, individual judges scores in the charts below (given in parentheses) are listed in this order from left to right: Brian Redmond, Loraine Barry, Arthur Gourounlian.

=== Week 1 ===
Running order

Couple	Score	Dance	Music
Stephanie & Ervinas	13 (4, 4, 5)	Cha-cha-cha	"Crazy What Love Can Do" — David Guetta, Becky Hill & Ella Henderson
Suzanne & Michael	23 (7, 8, 8)	Samba	"Woman" — Doja Cat
Kevin & Laura	19 (6, 6, 7)	Viennese Waltz	"You Know Me" — Robbie Williams
Paul & Salome	15 (4, 5, 6)	American Smooth	"Come Fly with Me" — Michael Bublé
Leah & John	14 (4, 4, 6)	Paso Doble	"School's Out" — Glee cast
Dr. Marie & Stephen	15 (5, 5, 5)	Jive	"Love Really Hurts Without You" — Billy Ocean
Damian & Kylee	19 (6, 7, 6)	Tango	"Shivers" — Ed Sheeran
Brooke & Maurizio	25 (8, 8, 9)	Salsa	"Let Them Know" — Mabel
Carl & Emily	16 (5, 5, 6)	Foxtrot	"Daydream Believer" — The Monkees
Shane & Karen	17 (6, 5, 6)	Quickstep	"Help!" — The Beatles
Panti & Denys	23 (7, 8, 8)	Cha-cha-cha	"I Wanna Dance with Somebody (Who Loves Me)" — Whitney Houston

=== Week 2 ===
Running order

Couple	Score	Dance	Music
Brooke & Maurizio	23 (7, 8, 8)	Quickstep	"Love Machine" — Girls Aloud
Damian & Kylee	20 (6, 7, 7)	Salsa	"Acapulco" — Jason Derulo
Dr. Marie & Stephen	16 (5, 5, 6)	Tango	"Olé Guapa" — Stanley Black And His Orchestra
Kevin & Laura	21 (7, 7, 7)	Jive	"Reet Petite" — The Overtones
Stephanie & Ervinas	13 (4, 5, 4)	Foxtrot	"Love Song" — Sara Bareilles
Leah & John	10 (3, 3, 4)	American Smooth	"This Will Be (An Everlasting Love)" — Natalie Cole
Shane & Karen	12 (3, 4, 5)	Cha-cha-cha	"Hey Baby" — DJ Ötzi
Paul & Salome	14 (4, 5, 5)	Samba	"Get Busy" — Sean Paul
Panti & Denys	19 (6, 6, 7)	Waltz	"(You Make Me Feel Like) A Natural Woman" — Aretha Franklin
Suzanne & Michael	25 (8, 8, 9)	Viennese Waltz	"Love on the Brain" — Rihanna
Carl & Emily	23 (7, 8, 8)	Paso Doble	"Beautiful Day" — U2

=== Week 3 ===
Running order

Couple	Score	Dance	Music	Result
Suzanne & Michael	15 (4, 5, 6)	Jive	"Runaround Sue" — The Fratellis	Safe
Kevin & Laura	17 (5, 6, 6)	Tango	"I Don't Like Mondays" — The Boomtown Rats	Safe
Paul & Salome	20 (6, 7, 7)	Waltz	"Take It to the Limit" — Eagles	Safe
Dr. Marie & Stephen	17 (5, 6, 6)	Salsa	"Mama Wanna Mambo" — Meghan Trainor	Safe
Panti & Denys	21 (7, 7, 7)	Quickstep	"Karma Chameleon" — Culture Club	Safe
Carl & Emily	20 (6, 7, 7)	Samba	"Shake Your Bon-Bon" — Ricky Martin	Last to be called safe
Damian & Kylee	25 (8, 8, 9)	Viennese Waltz	"All for You" — Cian Ducrot	Safe
Leah & John	11 (3, 4, 4)	Cha-cha-cha	"Bongo Cha Cha Cha" — Goodboys	Eliminated
Brooke & Robert	26 (8, 9, 9)	Rumba	"2002" — Anne-Marie	Safe
Stephanie & Ervinas	23 (7, 8, 8)	Charleston	"Hustle" — Pink	Safe
Shane & Karen	15 (5, 5, 5)	Paso Doble	"Born to Be Wild" — Steppenwolf	Last to be called safe

=== Week 4: Movie Week ===
Running order

Couple	Score	Dance	Music	Movie	Result
Dr. Marie & Stephen	15 (5, 5, 5)	Foxtrot	"Cruella de Vil" — Dr. John	101 Dalmatians	Eliminated
Brooke & Robert	24 (8, 8, 8)	Paso Doble	"The Greatest Show" — Panic! at the Disco	The Greatest Showman	Safe
Shane & Karen	18 (6, 6, 6)	Tango	"Wreck-It, Wreck-It Ralph" — Buckner & Garcia	Wreck-It Ralph	Safe
Stephanie & Ervinas	17 (5, 6, 6)	Salsa	"Rhythm of the Night" — Valeria	Moulin Rouge!	Last to be called safe
Kevin & Laura	21 (7, 7, 7)	American Smooth	"Pure Imagination" — Gene Wilder	Willy Wonka & the Chocolate Factory	Safe
Panti & Denys	22 (7, 7, 8)	Jive	"The Witches Are Back" — Bette Midler, Sarah Jessica Parker and Kathy Najimy	Hocus Pocus 2	Safe
Suzanne & Michael	23 (8, 7, 8)	Paso Doble	"America" — Rita Moreno	West Side Story	Last to be called safe
Carl & Emily	20 (6, 7, 7)	American Smooth	"If I Didn't Have You" — John Goodman and Billy Crystal	Monsters, Inc.	Safe
Paul & Salome	27 (9, 9, 9)	Charleston	"A Star Is Born" — Lillias White, LaChanze, Roz Ryan, Cheryl Freeman and Vaneese Thomas	Hercules	Safe
Damian & Kylee	25 (8, 8, 9)	Jive	"Burning Love" — Elvis Presley	Elvis	Safe

=== Week 5 ===
Running order

Couple	Score	Dance	Music	Result
Kevin & Laura	20 (6, 7, 7)	Cha-cha-cha	"Canned Heat" — Jamiroquai	Last to be called safe
Carl & Emily	22 (7, 7, 8)	Viennese Waltz	"Pointless" — Lewis Capaldi	Safe
Stephanie & Ervinas	14 (4, 5, 5)	Paso Doble	"Edge of Seventeen" — John Gibbons X LYRA	Safe
Shane & Karen	21 (7, 7, 7)	Salsa	"Cuban Pete" — Jim Carrey	Safe
Paul & Salome	16 (5, 5, 6)	Tango	"Locked Out of Heaven" — Bruno Mars	Eliminated
Brooke & Robert	26 (8, 9, 9)	Samba	"SloMo" — Chanel	Safe
Panti & Denys	27 (9, 9, 9)	Charleston	"Puttin' On the Ritz" — The Puppini Sisters	Safe
Damian & Kylee	23 (7, 8, 8)	Quickstep	"She's So Lovely" — Scouting for Girls	Last to be called safe
Suzanne & Michael	25 (8, 8, 9)	Contemporary Ballroom	"Keeping Your Head Up" — Birdy	Safe

=== Week 6: Dedicated Dance Week ===
Guest act: Erica-Cody performing her single, 'Cry Baby'.

There was no elimination in Week 6. The judges still scored and the public still voted. However, in a twist, the couple who received the highest combined points was immune from the following week's first Dance-Off, therefore securing their place in the competition until Week 8. The couple granted immunity was Panti & Denys.

Running order

Couple	Score	Dance	Music	Dedication	Result
Carl & Emily	23 (7, 8, 8)	Jive	"Higher Power" — Coldplay	His son, Daibhí	Safe
Damian & Kylee	27 (9, 9, 9)	Contemporary Ballroom	"Forever Young" — Becky Hill	The friends he made on 'Glee'	Safe
Suzanne & Michael	23 (7, 8, 8)	Cha-cha-cha	"Flashdance... What a Feeling" — Irene Cara	Her parents, Damian & Susan	Safe
Shane & Karen	23 (7, 8, 8)	Viennese Waltz	"We Are the Champions" — Queen	His friend and former teammate, Anthony Foley	Safe
Kevin & Laura	24 (8, 8, 8)	Paso Doble	"Smells Like Teen Spirit" — Nirvana	His daughter, Wallis	Safe
Brooke & Robert	25 (8, 8, 9)	Viennese Waltz	"Breakaway" — Kelly Clarkson	Her mother, Tracy	Safe
Stephanie & Ervinas	23 (7, 8, 8)	Contemporary Ballroom	"Fight Song" — Rachel Platten	Her teammates from the Republic of Ireland women's national football team	Safe
*Rory & Denys	29 (9, 10, 10)	Paso Doble	"It's a Sin" — Pet Shop Boys	His doctor, Prof. Fiona Mulcahy	Granted immunity

*This week saw Panti Bliss dance out of drag and was referred to as Rory.

=== Week 7 ===
Running order

Couple	Score	Dance	Music	Result
Shane & Karen	20 (6, 7, 7)	Jive	"Land Of 1,000 Dances" — Vinnie Jones	Safe
Suzanne & Michael	25 (8, 8, 9)	American Smooth	"I've Got You Under My Skin" — Tony Bennett & Lady Gaga	Bottom two
Stephanie & Ervinas	19 (6, 6, 7)	Samba	"Con Calma" — Daddy Yankee feat. Snow	Eliminated
Carl & Emily	24 (8, 8, 8)	Tango	"Sucker" — Jonas Brothers	Safe
Panti & Denys	22 (7, 7, 8)	Salsa	"Stupid Love" — Lady Gaga	Immune
Kevin & Laura	26 (8, 9, 9)	Quickstep	"Lust for Life" — Iggy Pop	Safe
Damian & Kylee	29 (9, 10, 10)	Charleston	"No Swinggity" — Minimatic	Safe
Brooke & Robert	27 (9, 9, 9)	Jive	"2 Be Loved (Am I Ready)" — Lizzo	Last to be called safe

Dance-Off

Judges' votes to save

- Gourounlian: Suzanne & Michael
- Redmond: Suzanne & Michael
- Barry: Did not vote, but would have voted to save Suzanne & Michael

=== Week 8: Orchestra Night ===
All performances this week were accompanied by the RTÉ Concert Orchestra.

Running order

Couple	Score	Dance	Music	Result
Kevin & Laura	24 (8, 8, 8)	Foxtrot	"Rocket Man" — Elton John	Safe
Suzanne & Michael	29 (9, 10, 10)	Charleston	"Hot Honey Rag" — John Kander	Last to be called safe
Shane & Karen	22 (7, 7, 8)	American Smooth	"Luck Be a Lady Tonight" — Frank Sinatra	Eliminated
Damian & Kylee	28 (9, 9, 10)	Paso Doble	"Sweet Child o' Mine" — Guns N' Roses	Safe
Brooke & Robert	30 (10, 10, 10)	Contemporary Ballroom	"Running Up That Hill (A Deal With God)" — Kate Bush	Safe
Panti & Denys	25 (8, 8, 9)	Tango	"Gimme! Gimme! Gimme! (A Man After Midnight)" — ABBA	Bottom two
Carl & Emily	23 (7, 8, 8)	Salsa	"Gangnam Style" — Psy	Safe

Dance-Off

Judges' votes to save

- Gourounlian: Panti & Denys
- Redmond: Panti & Denys
- Barry: Did not vote, but would have voted to save Panti & Denys

=== Week 9: Team Dance Week ===
Running order

Couple	Score	Dance	Music	Result
Brooke & Robert	28 (9, 9, 10)	Tango	"Libertango" — Escala	Bottom two
Kevin & Laura	23 (7, 8, 8)	Salsa	"Stay with Me" — Calvin Harris, Justin Timberlake, Halsey & Pharrell Williams	Safe
Carl & Emily	28 (9, 9, 10)	Charleston	"Bills" — LunchMoney Lewis	Safe
Damian & Kylee	25 (8, 8, 9)	Foxtrot	"Don't Let the Light Go Out" — Panic! at the Disco	Safe
Panti & Denys	27 (9, 9, 9)	American Smooth	"It's Oh So Quiet" — Björk	Eliminated
Suzanne & Michael	30 (10, 10, 10)	Rumba	"Young and Beautiful" — Lana Del Rey	Safe
Brooke & Robert; Damian & Kylee; Panti & Denys (Team Captain: Jake Carter with Karen)	27 (9, 9, 9)	Freestyle ("Hand-Clap Hustlers")	"HandClap" — Fitz and the Tantrums	
Carl & Emily; Kevin & Laura; Suzanne & Michael (Team Captain: Lottie Ryan with Stephen)	28 (8, 10, 10)	Freestyle ("Disco Dazzlers")	"Crying at the Discoteque" — Sophie Ellis-Bextor	

Dance-Off

Judges' votes to save

- Gourounlian: Brooke & Robert
- Redmond: Brooke & Robert
- Barry: Did not vote and did not infer whom she would have voted to save

=== Week 10: Fairy Tales Week ===
Guest act: Lyra singing her single, 'You'.

Running order

Couple	Score	Dance	Music	Fairy Tale	Result
Kevin & Laura	27 (9, 9, 9)	Charleston	"Cotton Eye Joe" — Rednex	The Three Little Pigs	Eliminated
Damian & Kylee	29 (9, 10, 10)	Rumba	"Stay" — Shakespears Sister	Sleeping Beauty	Safe
Suzanne & Michael	29 (9, 10, 10)	Tango	"Hungry Like the Wolf" — Duran Duran	Little Red Riding Hood	Bottom two
Brooke & Robert	30 (10, 10, 10)	Cha-cha-cha	"A Second to Midnight" — Years & Years and Kylie Minogue	Cinderella	Safe
Carl & Emily	26 (8, 9, 9)	Quickstep	"Hit the Road Jack" — Throttle	Jack and the Beanstalk	Safe
Brooke & Robert; Damian & Kylee; Carl & Emily; Suzanne & Michael; Kevin & Laura	5; 4; 3; 2; 1	Marathon	"I Want Candy" — Kidz Bop	Hansel and Gretel	

Dance-Off

Judges' votes to save

- Gourounlian: Suzanne & Michael
- Redmond: Kevin & Laura
- Barry: Suzanne & Michael

=== Week 11: The Final ===
Running order

Couple	Score	Dance	Music	Result
Carl & Emily	29 (9, 10, 10)	Paso Doble	"Beautiful Day" — U2	Winners
Carl & Emily	30 (10, 10, 10)	Showdance	"Celestial" — Ed Sheeran	Winners
Suzanne & Michael	30 (10, 10, 10)	Samba	"Woman" — Doja Cat	Runners-up
Suzanne & Michael	30 (10, 10, 10)	Showdance	"Fire Under My Feet" — Leona Lewis	Runners-up
Brooke & Robert	30 (10, 10, 10)	Paso Doble	"The Greatest Show" — Panic! at the Disco	Runners-up
Brooke & Robert	29 (10, 9, 10)	Showdance	"Hallucinate" — Dua Lipa	Runners-up
Damian & Kylee	30 (10, 10, 10)	Contemporary Ballroom	"Forever Young" — Becky Hill	Runners-up
Damian & Kylee	30 (10, 10, 10)	Showdance	"Take a Look At Us Now" — Shawn Mendes	Runners-up

== Dance chart ==
Highest scoring dance
Lowest scoring dance
No dance performed
Not performed due to illness or injury
Immune from elimination

Couple	1	2	3	4	5	6	7	8	9		10		11	
Carl & Emily	Foxtrot	Paso Doble	Samba	American Smooth	Viennese Waltz	Jive	Tango	Salsa	Charleston	Freestyle (Disco Dazzlers)	Quickstep	Marathon	Paso Doble	Showdance
Brooke & Robert	Salsa	Quickstep	Rumba	Paso Doble	Samba	Viennese Waltz	Jive	Contemporary Ballroom	Tango	Freestyle (Hand-Clap Hustlers)	Cha-cha-cha	Marathon	Paso Doble	Showdance
Damian & Kylee	Tango	Salsa	Viennese Waltz	Jive	Quickstep	Contemporary Ballroom	Charleston	Paso Doble	Foxtrot	Freestyle (Hand-Clap Hustlers)	Rumba	Marathon	Contemporary Ballroom	Showdance
Suzanne & Michael	Samba	Viennese Waltz	Jive	Paso Doble	Contemporary Ballroom	Cha-cha-cha	American Smooth	Charleston	Rumba	Freestyle (Disco Dazzlers)	Tango	Marathon	Samba	Showdance
Kevin & Laura	Viennese Waltz	Jive	Tango	American Smooth	Cha-cha-cha	Paso Doble	Quickstep	Foxtrot	Salsa	Freestyle (Disco Dazzlers)	Charleston	Marathon		
Panti & Denys	Cha-cha-cha	Waltz	Quickstep	Jive	Charleston	Paso Doble	Salsa	Tango	American Smooth	Freestyle (Hand-Clap Hustlers)				
Shane & Karen	Quickstep	Cha-cha-cha	Paso Doble	Tango	Salsa	Viennese Waltz	Jive	American Smooth						
Stephanie & Ervinas	Cha-cha-cha	Foxtrot	Charleston	Salsa	Paso Doble	Contemporary Ballroom	Samba							
Paul & Salome	American Smooth	Samba	Waltz	Charleston	Tango									
Dr. Marie & Stephen	Jive	Tango	Salsa	Foxtrot										
Leah & John	Paso Doble	American Smooth	Cha-cha-cha											
