= Maurizio Benenato =

Italian dancer and choreographer

- Born: 25 March 1991 (age 35); Caserta, Italy
- Occupations: Dancer; Choreographer

Maurizio Benenato (born 25 March 1991) is an Italian ballroom and Latin dancer and choreographer.

== Early life ==
Benenato began dancing at the age of five, specialising in both ballroom and Latin disciplines.

== Career ==
From February 2012 to March 2015, Benenato partnered Russian dancer, Tatiana Veselkina to great success. Together the couple were World 10 Dance Cup and European 10 Dance Cup Champions. In 2016 partnered with Russian dancer, Veronika Dichka. Their best placement came when they placed second at the WDSF Open in Moscow.

Following his competitive career, he joined the cast of the Riverdance show, Heartbeat of Home as a principal dancer and also danced with the Burn the Floor touring show.

In 2020, Benenato joined Strictly Come Dancing professional, Graziano Di Prima’s, Havana Nights UK touring show.

== Dancing with the Stars ==
On 22 December 2021, Benenato was announced as one of the new professionals to join the fifth season of the Irish version of Dancing with the Stars. He was partnered with author Cathy Kelly. They were the first couple to be eliminated from the series.

Benenato returned for the sixth season in 2023. He was partnered with Eurovision singer Brooke Scullion. However on 22 January, ahead of the third live show, Benenato announced his departure from the series stating personal reasons.

Series	Partner	Place
5	Cathy Kelly	12th

Series 5 – with celebrity partner Cathy Kelly

Week No.	Dance/Song	Judges' score			Total	Result
Week No.	Dance/Song	Redmond	Barry	Gourounlian	Total	Result
1	Cha-cha-cha / "How Will I Know"	4	5	5	14	No elimination
2	No dance performed	-	-	-	-	No elimination
3	Tango / "Call Me"	4	5	6	15	Eliminated

Series 6 – with celebrity partner Brooke Scullion

Week No.	Dance/Song	Judges' score			Total	Result
Week No.	Dance/Song	Redmond	Barry	Gourounlian	Total	Result
1	Salsa / "Let Them Know"	8	8	9	25	No elimination
2	Quickstep / "Love Machine"	7	8	8	23	No elimination
