= Denys Samson =

Ukrainian dancer and choreographer

- Born: 21 August 1989 (age 36); Odesa, Ukraine
- Occupations: Dancer; Choreographer

Denys Samson (Ukrainian: Денис Самсон; born 21 August 1989) is a Ukrainian ballroom and Latin dancer and choreographer.

== Career ==
Samson is a former two-time Ukrainian Ten Dance Champion and a two-time World Ten Dance Champion.

== Dancing with the Stars ==
=== Ukraine ===
In September 2021, Samson joined the cast of the ninth season of the Ukrainian version of Dancing with the Stars, Tantsi z zirkamy, as a professional dancer. He was originally partnered with comedian, Anastasia Orudzhova. However, in preparation for their first dance, Orudzhova suffered a knee injury and was forced to withdraw from the competition following her first performance. Orudzhova was replaced by her colleague and fellow-comedian, Oleksandra Mashlyatina and Samson partnered her instead. They were the second couple to be eliminated from the competition.

Series	Partner	Place
9	Anastasia Orudzhova	15th
9	Oleksandra Mashlyatina	13th

=== Ireland ===
On 22 December 2021, Samson was announced as one of the new professionals to join the fifth season of the Irish version of Dancing with the Stars. He reached the final with singer and songwriter, Erica-Cody, finishing as joint runners-up to Nina Carberry & Pasquale La Rocca.

Samson returned for the sixth series in 2023, where he was partnered with drag queen, Panti Bliss. This made them the first same-sex pairing in the history of the show. They were the sixth couple to be eliminated from the show, after losing their dance-off to Brooke Scullion and Robert Rowiński.

Samson returned for the seventh series in 2024, where he was partnered with Ireland's Fittest Family presenter, Laura Fox. They reached the final, finishing as joint runners-up to Jason Smyth &Karen Byrne.

Samson returned for the eighth series in 2025, where he is partnered with Ireland AM presenter, Elaine Crowley. They were the second couple to be eliminated from the show.

On 23 November 2025, Samson announced that he was leaving the show.

Series	Partner	Place
5	Erica-Cody	2nd
6	Panti Bliss	6th
7	Laura Fox	2nd
8	Elaine Crowley	10th

Highest and Lowest Scoring Per Dance

Dance	Partner	Highest	Partner	Lowest
American Smooth	Panti Bliss	27	Erica-Cody	25
Cha-cha-cha	Erica-Cody	30	Panti Bliss	23
Charleston	Erica-Cody; Laura Fox	30	Panti Bliss	27
Contemporary Ballroom	Erica-Cody	29	Laura Fox	22
Foxtrot	Erica-Cody	23		
Jive	Laura Fox	30	Elaine Crowley	18
Paso Doble	Panti Bliss	29	Elaine Crowley	17
Quickstep	Laura Fox	25	Panti Bliss	21
Rumba	Erica-Cody	26		
Salsa	Erica-Cody	27	Elaine Crowley	15
Samba	Laura Fox	27	Erica-Cody	24
Showdance	Laura Fox	30	Erica-Cody	28
Tango	Laura Fox	27	Erica-Cody	20
Viennese Waltz	Laura Fox	22		
Waltz	Panti Bliss	19	Elaine Crowley	17

Series 5 – with celebrity partner Erica-Cody

Week No.	Dance/Song	Judges' score			Total	Result
Week No.	Dance/Song	Redmond	Barry	Gourounlian	Total	Result
1	No dance performed	-	-	-	-	No elimination
2	Samba / "Kiss My (Uh Oh)"	8	8	8	24	No elimination
3	Foxtrot / "My Girl"	7	8	8	23	Safe
4	Charleston / "When We're Human"	9	9	10	28	Safe
5	Rumba / "Girl on Fire"	8	9	9	26	Safe
6	Tango / "Body II Body"	7	6	7	20	No elimination
7	Salsa / "Don't Go Yet"	9	9	9	27	Bottom two
8	American Smooth / "Too Darn Hot"	8	8	9	25	Safe
9^{1}	Contemporary Ballroom / "Rise Up"	9	10	10	29	Safe
10	Cha-cha-cha / "Mambo Italiano"; Team Dance / "Istanbul (Not Constantinople)"	10; 9	10; 10	10; 10	30; 29	Safe
11	Jive / "Let's Go Crazy"; Bust-a-Move Marathon / "I'm So Excited"	8 Awarded	9; 3	9 points	26; 29	Bottom two
12	Charleston / "When We're Human"; Showdance / "Glitterball"	10; 9	10; 9	10; 10	30; 28	Runners-up

^{1}In week 9, Samson tested positive for COVID-19, so his partner, Erica-Cody danced with Ervinas Merfeldas.

Series 6 – with celebrity partner Panti Bliss

Week No.	Dance/Song	Judges' score			Total	Result
Week No.	Dance/Song	Redmond	Barry	Gourounlian	Total	Result
1	Cha-cha-cha / "I Wanna Dance With Somebody (Who Loves Me)"	7	8	8	23	No elimination
2	Waltz / "(You Make Me Feel Like) A Natural Woman"	6	6	7	19	No elimination
3	Quickstep / "Karma Chameleon"	7	7	7	21	Safe
4	Jive / "The Witches Are Back"	7	7	8	22	Safe
5	Charleston / "Puttin' On the Ritz"	9	9	9	27	Safe
6	Paso Doble / "It's a Sin"	9	10	10	29	No elimination Granted immunity
7	Salsa / "Stupid Love"	7	7	8	22	Safe
8	Tango / "Gimme! Gimme! Gimme! (A Man After Midnight)"	8	8	9	25	Bottom two
9	American Smooth / "It's Oh So Quiet"; Team Freestyle / "HandClap"	9; 9	9; 9	9; 9	27; 27	Eliminated

Series 7 – with celebrity partner Laura Fox

Week No.	Dance/Song	Judges' score			Total	Result
Week No.	Dance/Song	Redmond	Barry	Gourounlian	Total	Result
1	Jive / "River Deep – Mountain High"	7	7	7	21	No elimination
2	Contemporary Ballroom / "Cruel Summer"	7	7	8	22	No elimination
3	Paso Doble / "Don't Let Me Be Misunderstood"	7	8	8	23	Safe
4	Viennese Waltz / "Somewhere Over The Rainbow"	7	7	8	22	Safe
5	Samba / "Échame La Culpa"	9	9	9	27	Safe
6	Quickstep / "Galway Girl"	8	8	9	25	No elimination
7	Cha-cha-cha / "yes, and?"	8	8	8	24	Safe
8	Tango / "Take On Me"	9	9	9	27	Safe
9	Charleston / "Do Your Thing"; Team Dance / "A Little Party Never Killed Nobody (All We Got)"	10; 9	10; 10	10; 10	30; 29	Safe
10	American Smooth / "Monster Mash"; Scare-a-thon / "Dead Ringer for Love"	8 Awarded	9; 4	9 points	26; 30	Safe
11	Jive / "River Deep – Mountain High"; Showdance / "Make It Look Easy"	10; 10	10; 10	10; 10	30; 30	Runners-up

Series 8 – with celebrity partner Elaine Crowley

Week No.	Dance/Song	Judges' score				Total	Result
Week No.	Dance/Song	Redmond	Byrne	Barry	Gourounlian	Total	Result
1	Waltz / "Three Times a Lady"	5	6	5	7	23	No elimination
2	Paso Doble / "Standing in the Way of Control"	5	6	6	6	23	No elimination
3	Salsa / "Turn the Beat Around"	5	5	5	5	20	Safe
4	Jive / "You Can't Stop the Beat"	6	6	-	6	18	Eliminated
