= Chachua =

Chachua (Georgian: ჩაჩუა) is a Georgian surname. Notable people with the surname include:

- Akaki Chachua (born 1969), Georgian wrestler
- Ambrosiy Chachua (born 1994), Ukrainian footballer
- Salome Chachua (born 1990), Georgian dancer and choreographer
