= María (Ricky Martin song) =

1995 single by Ricky Martin

Single by Ricky Martin

from the album A Medio Vivir
- Language: Spanish
- A-side: "The Cup of Life" (Australia only)
- B-side: "Dónde Estarás"; "Bombón de Azúcar"; "Volverás"
- Released: November 21, 1995; December 19, 1995 (Pablo Flores Spanglish Remix)
- Genre: Flamenco; dance; salsa
- Length: 4:23
- Label: Sony Music Mexico; Columbia
- Songwriters: Ian Blake; Luis Gómez-Escolar; K.C. Porter
- Producers: KC Porter; Tom Vickers; Steve Berkowitz

Ricky Martin singles chronology
"Te Extraño, Te Olvido, Te Amo" (1995)	"María" (1995)	"A Medio Vivir" (1996)

Music video
- "María" on YouTube

Audio sample
- file; help

Alternative cover
- Cover artwork used in Mexico

"María" is a song recorded by Puerto Rican singer Ricky Martin for his third studio album, A Medio Vivir (1995). The song was written by Ian Blake, Luis Gómez-Escolar, and KC Porter, while the production was handled by Porter, Tom Vickers, and Steve Berkowitz. It was released by Sony Music Mexico as the second single from the album on November 21, 1995. A Spanish language flamenco, dance, and salsa song, it is about an attractive but dangerous woman called "María". Local DJ Pablo Flores remixed the song, turning it into an up-tempo samba tune in a house bassline. The remix version became more popular than the original one.

The song has received highly positive reviews from music critics, who complimented its production and catchy rhythm. The remix was ranked as one of the Greatest Latin Pop Songs of All Time by Rolling Stone, and was listed among the 11 remixes of classic Latin hits by Billboard. It is known as the song that launched the Latin and dance music crossover of the 1990s. "María" was also commercially successful, becoming Martin's breakthrough song and his first international hit. It topped the charts in 20 countries and has sold over five million physical copies worldwide, earning the Guinness World Record for the biggest Latin hit. It has received several certifications, including diamond in France.

The first accompanying music videos for the original song and Pablo Flores remix were filmed in La Boca, and aired in 1995. A re-made version of the video for the remix was filmed in Paris and directed by Memo del Bosque. It aired in 1998 and depicts Martin walking around the city and dancing in the streets. To promote the song, Martin performed it on several television programs and award shows, including both the Grammy Awards and the Brit Awards in 2000. Multiple contestants on various music talent shows have covered the song, including Carlito Olivero.

== Background and development ==
In the beginning of Ricky Martin's career as a solo artist, Latin pop music was mainly made up of romantic ballads. When he was in Mexico, he discovered that Mexicans are very proud of their traditional music genre, Mariachi, and so he told his composer Draco Rosa: "We have to be proud of who we are. They have their thing in Mexico. Let's go with what we have in Puerto Rico." Therefore, he allowed himself "to go into a very Latin, African sound" on "María" and they created a mix of different Latin music genres. He wrote about the recording in Me, his official autobiography:

On this song we fused Latin rhythms with pop, and it had a tempo and vibe that was distinct from everything else on the record, but it was also completely different from anything else I had ever done. I knew there was a certain amount of risk in releasing such different material, but the results spoke for themselves.

Although Martin was satisfied with the track and he describes it as a song that he is "extremely proud of", the first time he played it for a record label executive, the man said: "Are you crazy? You have ruined your career! I can't believe you are showing me this. You're finished — this is going to be your last album." In an interview with Rolling Stone, he told the magazine that "everybody got scared. They said, 'What are you doing? This is the end of your career. [...] You do ballads, and now you're doing Latin sounds. The album is not going to work.'" As Martin wrote about it in Me, he remembers that it "felt completely surreal", couldn't believe what he was hearing, and he was "devastated".

Even though he really "loved" the song, hearing those words from "a high-ranking label executive" made him doubt himself and the work he had done. He thought with himself: "This guy is not even a musician, so I'm sure he didn't have the slightest clue about what it takes to lock yourself up in a studio and make music, everything you go through, emotionally speaking." Since making music is "a very personal process" for Martin, he felt the executive was attacking him at one of his "most vulnerable moments", and so he "took everything he said very personally". Martin even imagined his career was over and he "would never again be able to make a record or perform live on a stage". But despite this fear, he remained silent and did not say anything to the executive or anyone else. He experienced a few days of anxiety, but after that, the boss of the executive selected the song to be released as a single.

== Music and lyrics ==
Musically, "María" is a Spanish-language flamenco, dance, and salsa song, featuring elements of mariachi, samba, cumbia, Latin, African, Caribbean, and Latin pop. It was written by Ian Blake, Luis Gómez-Escolar, and KC Porter, while the production was handled by Porter, Tom Vickers, and Steve Berkowitz. Also, American musician Draco Rosa joined the original version's lyricists to write the Spanglish radio edit version, which was remixed by Puerto Rican DJ Pablo Flores. On the remix, Flores upped the tempo and the sex appeal of the song, turning the slow-burn flamenco laced track into an up-tempo samba tune in a house bassline. Suzy Exposito from Rolling Stone described it as "an electrifying, techno-samba ode to a difficult woman". According to the original song's sheet music on Musicnotes.com, "María" is composed in the key of G minor with a groove of 120 beats per minute. Martin's vocals span from the low note of D_{4} to the high note of G_{5}. The album version track runs for a total of 4 minutes and 22 seconds, while the Spanglish radio edit one runs for a total of 4 minutes and 31 seconds.

Lyrically, the song is about an attractive but dangerous woman called "María". Upon release, there were rumors that the song is an ode to cocaine, with lyrics including, "Así es María / Blanca como el día / Pero es veneno si te quieres enamorar / Así es María / Tan caliente y fría / Que si te la bebes de seguro te va a matar" (This is Maria / White like the day / But it is poison, if you fall in love / This is Maria / So hot and cold / That if you drink it, it will surely kill you). During an interview with El Tiempo, Martin strongly denied the rumor and got angry about it: "I will never exalt drugs. María is a song that talks about Latina women and how addictive they can be, but does not mention or allude to drugs." He continued: "Latin women are capable of bringing any man who is seduced by her to their knees, but that has nothing to do with drugs and any comment made in that sense is, at least, malicious."

== Release and promotion ==
Sony Music Mexico released "María" on CD on November 21, 1995, as the second single from Martin's third studio album, A Medio Vivir. It was included as the third track on the album, released September 12, 1995. Later that year, Flores remixed the song and the remix version became more popular than the original. In 1996 and 1997, a CD single, titled "(Un, Dos, Tres) Maria", which includes both album version and Pablo Flores remix, was released in several European countries such as France, Germany, Italy, Spain, and the United Kingdom. Also in 1996, an extended play, titled Maria (Remixes), containing six remixes of the song was released in the United States. In 1998, Sony Music Asia released a promo CD containing three versions of "María", and "The Cup of Life". Additionally, in the same year, Epic Records released "María" as a commercial CD single in Japan on March 25. The song was also used as a musical backdrop for a television advertisement campaign for Japanese vehicle manufacture Suzuki in the same month. In Australia, "María" was released as a double A-side single with "The Cup of Life" on June 1, 1998. "María (Pablo Flores Spanglish Radio Edit)" was included as the 14th track on Martin's fifth studio album Ricky Martin, released May 11, 1999.

== Critical reception ==
"María" has been met with widely positive reviews from music critics. Larry Flick from Billboard labeled the song "[a] rousing tribal anthem", and praised it for working "extremely well within the confines of a house bassline, which is iced, contrasting with the original cut's flashy horns and rave-ish synths". He described its chants as "infectious" and said that they "add fleshy fun to the spree of wriggling percussion". Also from Billboard, Lucas Villa stated: "This is the Wepa! that launched the Latin and dance music crossover of the '90s." Suzy Exposito from Rolling Stone noted that although Martin's American fans may remember him since his English-language crossover, "he had the rest of the world swooning upon the 1995 release of 'María'". In another article, she named it a "megahit", the same as a writer of ¡Hola!. Luca Mastinu from Optimagazine ranked it as one of Martin's five greatest hits and wrote: "'Un, dos, tres, un pasito pa'lante Maria' is the verse that we have all sung at least once in our life." At Zeleb, an author labeled the track "a great song with capital letters" and stated: "If to a hit like this, we add a Latin hottie such as [...] Martin, with half hair and hips with impossible movements, it was clear that the world was going to dance that of 'Un pasito p'alante, María'." Cristian Grosso from La Nación described "María" as catchy. Toby Rose from Evening Standard wrote that it is "the summer holiday smash hit, the one that every bar and Eurodisco from Mykonos to Tenerife plays non-stop - the one that, however much you try you cannot stop yourself from humming".

An author of Music & Media called the song an "excellent flamenco flavoured pop tune" and credited it as "a large step towards attaining the same status" as what Martin had in Latin America "in other parts of the world". Christophe Sabot, program director of French nationwide CHR network NRJ said that "Latin music is bound to enjoy a great future" and that he believes in "the rise of Latin music in Europe". Music Week rated the song four out of five, viewing it as a "lively Latinpop stomper". The reviewer added, "Can the UK resist its racy rhythms? Probably not." Los 40's Alejandro Gomez Lizarraga described it as "a very danceable song that does not fail at any party worth its salt". Also from Los 40, Laura Coca labeled it "[a] legend", questioning, "who has not given everything with each and every one of its verses?", and Ramon Redondo named it "one of the songs of the summer". He also celebrated its "highly catchy rhythm and lyrics". Olivier Pérou from Le Point stated that with "María", Martin "with the face of an angel has even become an object of international fantasy" and "some have even learned, thanks to him, to count to three in Spanish". Writing for O, The Oprah Magazine, Amanda Mitchell ranked the track as Martin's tenth best song on her 2019 list and complimented it as "undeniably catchy". Also in 2020, MTV Argentina ranked it as one of Martin's best songs. In 2022, Noelia Bertol from Cadena Dial listed oy among the "10 Ricky Martin songs that brighten up summers", labeling it "the jewel in the crown".

=== Accolades ===
In 2018, Cadena Dial hailed the song as the most famous song of the last 24 years. In the same year, Rolling Stone ranked "María (Pablo Flores Remix)" as the 27th Greatest Latin Pop Song of All Time, and in 2020, Billboard placed it on an unranked list of 11 remixes of classic Latin hits. Also, according to ABC, "María" was voted the favorite song of the summer of all time in Spain, based on a study in 2011. Amazon Music ranked the track as the 31st best-ever Latin hit. It was recognized as one of the best-performing songs of the year at the 1997 BMI Latin Awards.

== Commercial performance ==
"María" became Martin's breakthrough song and his first international hit. It topped the charts in 20 countries, and has sold over five million physical copies worldwide. As a result, the song was featured in the 1999 edition of The Guinness Book of Records as the biggest Latin hit. It was also the Song of the Summer in Spain in 1996 and was the second best-selling single in the world that year. In Australia, "María" spent six weeks at number one. It topped the country's year-end chart in 1998 and was certified platinum by the Australian Recording Industry Association (ARIA), denoting shipments of over 70,000 copies in the region. The song topped the Ultratop Wallonia chart of Belgium for 10 consecutive weeks and was certified double platinum by the Belgian Entertainment Association (BEA), denoting sales of over 100,000 copies in the country.

"María" spent nine weeks at number one in France, where it became Martin's first number-one hit and was certified diamond by the Syndicat National de l'Édition Phonographique (SNEP), denoting shipments of over 750,000 copies in the country. As of 2014, the song has sold over 1.4 million copies in France. The track also peaked at number three in Germany, where it was certified gold by Bundesverband Musikindustrie (BVMI), denoting shipments of over 250,000 copies in the country. In Israel, it became the second Spanish language song in history to reach number one, following "Macarena" (1993). In the United Kingdom, "(Un, Dos, Tres) María" debuted at number six, giving Martin his first top 10 hit in the region. Additionally, "María" peaked at number one in Argentina, Brazil, Chile, Colombia, Costa Rica, Ecuador, El Salvador, Guatemala, Honduras, Hungary, Mexico, Panama, Paraguay, Puerto Rico, and Venezuela, as well as the top 10 in Austria, Denmark, Finland, Italy, the Netherlands, New Zealand, Sweden, and Switzerland. The song was also a big hit in Croatia, Greece, and Turkey.

In the United States, "María" debuted at number 22 on Billboard's Hot Latin Tracks chart on December 9, 1995, becoming Martin's ninth entry on the chart. It subsequently peaked at number six on the chart on February 3, 1996, giving Martin his fifth top 10 hit. On the US Billboard Hot 100 chart, "María" debuted at number 90 on the chart issue dated July 20, 1996, becoming Martin's first entry. It later peaked at number 88 in its twelfth week on the Hot 100. The track also reached number 33 on the US Top 40/Rhythm-Crossover chart on September 28, 1996. On the US Maxi-Singles Sales chart, the song originally peaked at number 34 on July 27, 1996, but almost one year and a half later, it re-entered the chart and reached a new peak of 28 on the chart issue dated February 21, 1998.

== Music videos ==
A screenshot from the music video, depicting Martin singing the song in a street in Paris.

The first accompanying music videos for the original song and Pablo Flores remix were filmed in La Boca, a barrio of Buenos Aires, Argentina. They were aired in 1995, and throughout them, Martin is seen with straight hair, blonde highlights, and a wide white shirt. He dances happily with the background of the tenements with colorful roofs and several neighbors as extras. Following "(Un, Dos, Tres) María"'s success in France, a re-made version of the video for the Pablo Flores remix was filmed in Paris and directed by Memo del Bosque. It was aired in 1998, and shows Martin walking around Paris, from Montmartre to the Champs-Élysées. It depicts Martin counting on his fingers, which is similar to the lyrics of the song, "Un, dos, tres" (One, two, three). Maria was played by spanish model Laura Cisneros. The visual also shows Martin swaying to salsa tunes and making most of the women he meets in the streets crack. In a scene, he throws himself on the hood of a car, firmly determined to seduce the driver. The "grainy" music video continues with Martin's dance steps. The last video is available on the singer's YouTube channel and has received over 175 million views, as of August 2021. Cristal Mesa from mitú named the visual Martin's 24th best music video on her 2018 list, and an author of Cultura Colectiva listed it among the "13 Videos to Appreciate Ricky Martin's Talent and Sickening Good Looks".

A fourth version for the English Language version also exists, which was shown in countries like Australia. It features Ricky in a white suit in various indoor settings, including a room with a white couch, a room with a painted multicolored wall and a room with fluffy white walls. The video shows many female and male models dancing and wearing different outfits in various states of dress and make up. Some of the characters include a woman wearing a dress made of polaroids, a woman with long protruding snake like strands of hair that stick upwards, a black woman in a white wig and pearls, other women in various wigs and bikinis, some holding fans and feather Boas, and men with face paint. No version exists on Youtube due to Copyright restrictions but it is featured on the Australian CD/DVD release Greatest Hits: Souvenir Edition

== Live performances ==
In an interview with Billboard in 1998, Martin told the magazine: "'Maria' is a song I am going to be singing for the rest of my life." The song was included on the set lists for Martin's the A Medio Vivir Tour, the Vuelve World Tour, the Livin' la Vida Loca Tour, the One Night Only with Ricky Martin tour, the Black and White Tour, the Música + Alma + Sexo World Tour, the Ricky Martin Live tour, the Live in Mexico tour, the One World Tour, the All In residency, the Ricky Martin en Concierto, the Movimiento Tour, and the Enrique Iglesias and Ricky Martin Live in Concert tour. Martin also performed the track along with his other hits during the 37th, 48th, 55th, and 61st editions of the Viña del Mar International Song Festival in 1996, 2007, 2014, and 2020, respectively.

He performed a medley of "Te Extraño, Te Olvido, Te Amo" and "María" at the 1996 Premios ERES. The following year, he gave another performance of "María" in the ceremony, this time along with "Bombón de Azúcar". Martin delivered a performance of "(Un, Dos, Tres) María" on the BBC's Top of the Pops on September 19, 1997. He also performed "María" and "Te Extraño, Te Olvido, Te Amo" at the 47th edition of the Miss World pageant on November 22, 1997, and "María" and "La Copa de la Vida" on Hey Hey It's Saturday on June 4, 1998. Additionally, he performed "María" in a ring of fire at the 42nd Annual Grammy Awards on February 23, 2000, and later that year, he performed it along with "Livin' la Vida Loca" and "The Cup of Life" at the 20th Annual Brit Awards on March 3.

== Cover versions and appearances in media ==
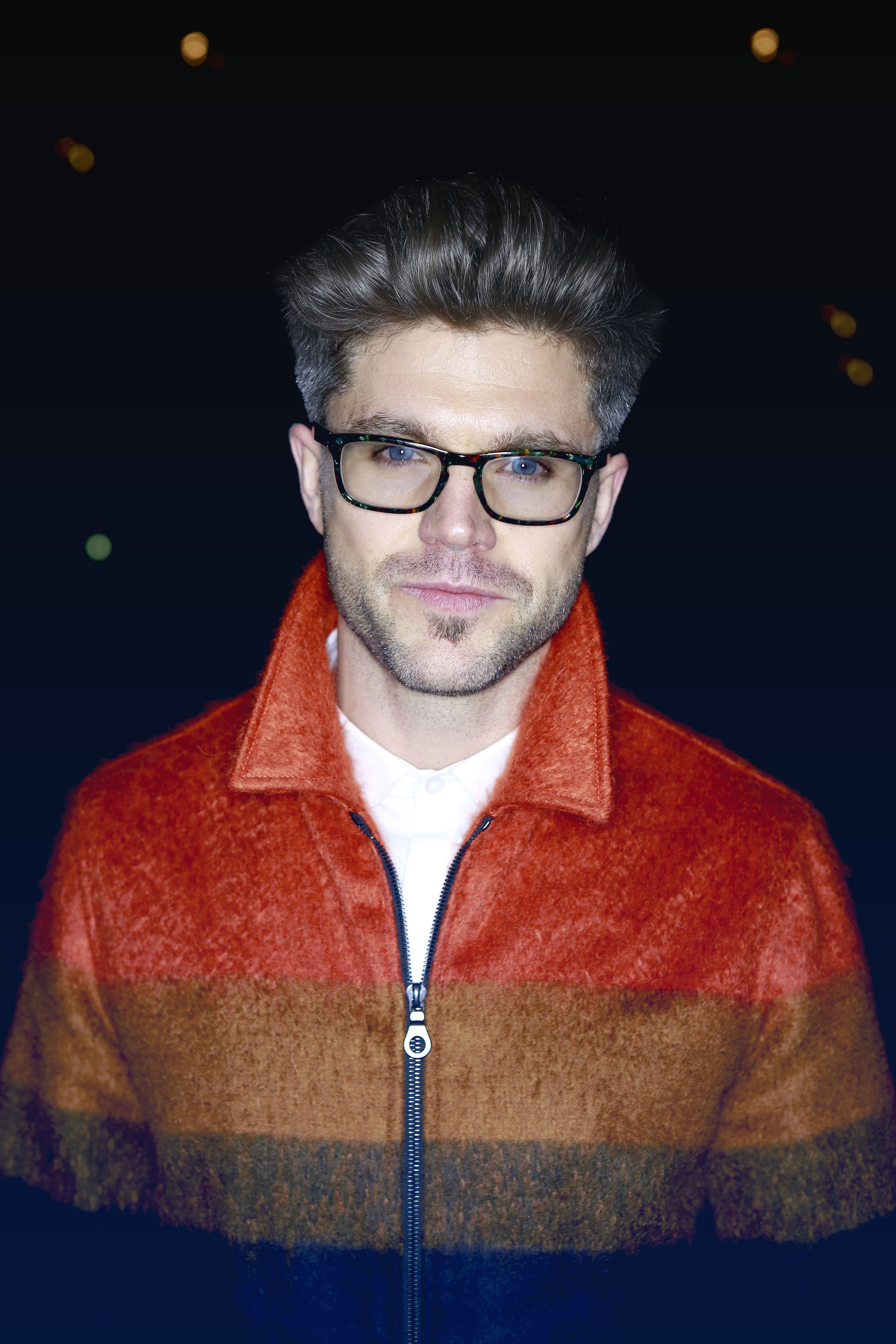
Darren Kennedy (pictured) and Karen Byrne danced to "María" on Dancing with the Stars.

"María" has been covered by several contestants on various music talent shows. Robert Kudelski delivered a performance of the track on the sixth season of Jak oni śpiewają in 2009. Paola Miranda and Federico Moore performed it together on the third season of the Argentine television series Cantando por un Sueño in 2011. Former Menudo member Carlito Olivero performed a medley of "La Copa de la Vida" and "María" on season three of The X Factor in 2013. "María" has been used multiple times in Argentine dance competition television series Bailando por un Sueño; Evangelina Anderson y Julián Carvajal danced to it on the 2008 season, Cinthia Fernández and Gabriel Usandivaras on the 2011 season, and María Sol Pérez and Fernando Bertona on the 2017 season.

In 2015, Junior New System performed a multi-track dance using a medley composed of "We Will Rock You" by Queen, "This Is How We Do It" by Montell Jordan, "María", "Let's Get Loud" by Jennifer Lopez, and "Crazy in Love" by Beyoncé on the first season of Asia's Got Talent. Darren Kennedy and Karen Byrne danced to "María" on series three of the Irish television series Dancing with the Stars in 2019. During the show, Kennedy talked about his struggles as a shy adolescent and how Martin helped him find his identity. In the same year, John Kelly and Annette Dytrt danced to the track on the fourth season of Dancing on Ice. In 2022, Colombian singer Karol G performed "María" at the 21st Coachella Festival as part of a homage to "all the Latin songs that went number one in the world and were never played" in the festival but gave her the "opportunity" to be there. "María" was the main theme of the Brazilian telenovela Salsa e Merengue (1996–1997). The song is available on the main setlist for the dance video game Just Dance 2014. "María (Pablo Flores Spanglish Radio Edit)" was featured in the American animated comedy film Despicable Me 3 (2017).

== Formats and track listings ==
- Australian CD 1
1. "The Cup of Life" – 4:28
2. "The Cup of Life" (Remix – Radio Edit) – 4:37
3. "La Copa de la Vida" (Remix – Spanglish Radio Edit) – 4:37
4. "La Copa de la Vida" – 4:28
5. "María" (Jason Nevins Remix) – 3:45
- Australian CD 2
1. "María" (Radio Edit) – 4:31
2. "La Copa de la Vida/The Cup of Life" (Spanglish Radio Edit) – 4:37
3. "María" (Album Version) – 4:23
4. "María" (Perc A Pella Mix) – 5:07
5. "La Copa de la Vida" (Spanish) – 4:37
- European CD maxi-single
1. "María" (Spanglish Radio Edit) – 3:58
2. "María" (Spanish Radio Edit) – 4:38
3. "María" (Spanglish Extended) – 7:56
4. "María" (Spanish Extended) – 8:10
5. "María" (Spanglish Dub) – 6:07
6. "María" (Perc A Pella Mix) – 5:07
- French CD
1. "María" (Spanish Radio Edit) – 4:38
2. "María" (Version Album) – 4:23
- Japanese CD maxi-single
1. "María" (Spanglish Radio Edit) – 4:31
2. "María" (Original Album Version) – 4:21
3. "María" (Perc A Pella Mix) – 5:08
4. "María" (Spanglish Dub) – 6:07
- Spanish CD maxi-single
1. "María" (Club Mix) – 8:10
2. "María" (Dub Mix) – 6:05
3. "María" (Spanglish Radio Edit) – 4:31
4. "María" (Spanglish Extended) – 7:56
5. "Dónde Estarás" (Version Remix) – 4:51
6. "Bombón de Azúcar" (M+M Classic Club Mix) – 6:14
7. "Bombón de Azúcar" (The Disco Dream Dub) – 5:20
- UK CD
1. "María" (Spanglish Radio Edit) – 4:30
2. "María" (Spanish Radio Edit) – 4:38
3. "Dónde Estarás" (Pablo and Javier's Moon Mix) – 9:18
4. "Volverás" (Album Version) – 4:53
- UK CD 12-inch single
1. "María" (Spanglish Extended) – 7:56
2. "María" (Spanish Extended) – 8:10
3. "María" (12" Club Mix) – 5:50
4. "María" (Spanglish Dub) – 6:07
5. "María" (Perc A Pella Mix) – 5:07
- US CD 12-inch single
1. "María" (Spanglish Extended) – 7:56
2. "María" (Spanish Extended) – 8:10
- US CD maxi-single
1. "María" (Spanglish Radio Edit) – 4:31
2. "María" (Spanish Radio Edit) – 4:38
3. "María" (Spanglish Extended) – 7:56
4. "María" (Spanish Extended) – 8:10
5. "María" (Spanglish Dub) – 6:07
6. "María" (Perc A Pella Mix) – 5:07

== Credits and personnel ==
=== Original version ===
Credits adapted from Tidal.

- Ricky Martin – vocal, associated performer
- Ian Blake – composer, lyricist, arranger, associated performer, co-producer, drums, engineer, keyboards
- Luis Gómez-Escolar – composer, lyricist
- K.C. Porter – composer, lyricist, producer, arranger, associated performer, director, drums, engineer, keyboards, piano
- Tom Vickers – producer
- Steve Berkowitz – producer
- Frank Marocco – accordion
- Tim Pierce – acoustic guitar
- Michael Thompson – acoustic guitar, guitar
- Jeremy Lubbock – arranger, director
- Suzi Katayama – arranger
- Leslie Ann Jones – assistant engineer
- June Murakawa – assistant engineer
- Chris Vela – assistant engineer
- Diego De Pietri – assistant engineer
- Eddie Miller – assistant engineer
- Sebastian Krys – assistant engineer
- Mike Aarvold – assistant engineer, mixing engineer
- Willie Wheaton – associated performer
- Ricky Nelson – associated performer
- Jessica Williams – associated performer
- Alex Brown – associated performer
- Della Miles – associated performer
- Terry Steele – associated performer
- Tony Warren – associated performer
- Bridgette Bryant – associated performer
- Maxayn Lewis – associated performer
- Terry Bradford – associated performer
- Gustavo Laureano – associated performer
- Mona Lisa Young – associated performer
- Maxi Anderson – associated performer
- Anita Sherman – associated performer
- Jackie Gouche Farris – associated performer
- Philip Ingram – associated performer
- Stella Payton – associated performer
- Sue Ann Carwell – associated performer
- Néil Stubenhaus – bass
- Lee Sklar – bass
- Mike Baird – drums
- Dennie Fongheiser – drums
- Ralf Stemmann – drums, engineer, keyboards, piano
- Vinnie Colaiuta – drums
- Don Hahn – engineer
- John Lengel – engineer
- Michael Landau – guitar
- Jussi Wenger – guitar
- Robbie Buchanan – keyboards, piano
- Randy Waldman – keyboards, piano
- Claude Gaudette – keyboards, piano
- Brian Gardner – mastering engineer
- Joe Palmaccio – mastering engineer
- Kathy Yore – mixing engineer
- Benny Faccone – mixing engineer, recording engineer
- Luis Enrique – percussion
- Luis Conte – percussion
- Sam Riney – saxophone

=== Pablo Flores Spanglish Radio Edit ===
Credits adapted from Tidal.

- Ricky Martin – vocal, associated performer
- KC Porter – composer, lyricist, producer, arranger
- Robi Rosa – composer, lyricist, co-producer
- Luis Gómez-Escolar – composer, lyricist
- Pablo Flores – producer, re-mixer
- Javier Garza – producer, re-mixer

== Charts ==
=== Weekly charts ===
Weekly peak performance for "María"
Chart (1995–1998)	Peak position
Argentina (Notimex)	1
Australia (ARIA) with "The Cup of Life"	1
Austria (Ö3 Austria Top 40)	4
Belgium (Ultratop 50 Flanders)	2
Belgium (Ultratop 50 Wallonia)	1
Brazil (Notimex)	1
Canada Dance/Urban (RPM)	8
Chile (Notimex)	1
Colombia (Notimex)	1
Costa Rica (Notimex)	1
Denmark (Tracklisten)	6
Ecuador (Notimex)	1
El Salvador (Notimex)	1
Europe (European Hot 100 Singles)	2
Finland (Suomen virallinen lista)	9
France (SNEP)	1
Germany (GfK)	3
Honduras (Notimex)	1
Hungary (Mahasz)	1
Iceland (Íslenski Listinn Topp 40)	27
Ireland (IRMA)	12
Israel (IBA)	1
Italy (Musica e dischi/FIMI)	2
Italy Airplay (Music & Media)	2
Japan (Oricon Singles Chart)	93
Mexico (Notimex)	1
Netherlands (Dutch Top 40)	5
Netherlands (Single Top 100)	6
New Zealand (Recorded Music NZ)	7
Norway (VG-lista)	11
Panama (Notimex)	1
Paraguay (Notimex)	1
Poland Airplay (Music & Media)	12
Puerto Rico (Notimex)	1
Scottish Singles Sales (Official Charts)	9
Spain (AFYVE)	11
Sweden (Sverigetopplistan)	3
Switzerland (Schweizer Hitparade)	3
UK Singles (Official Charts)	6
US Billboard Hot 100	88
US Dance Singles Sales (Billboard)	28
US Hot Latin Songs (Billboard)	6
Venezuela (Notimex)	1

=== Year-end charts ===
1997 year-end chart performance for "María"
Chart (1997)	Position
Belgium (Ultratop 50 Flanders)	9
Belgium (Ultratop 50 Wallonia)	4
Europe (European Hot 100 Singles)	9
France (SNEP)	2
Germany (Media Control)	17
Israel (IBA)	11
Netherlands (Dutch Top 40)	25
Netherlands (Single Top 100)	29
Romania (Romanian Top 100)	44
Sweden (Topplistan)	28
Switzerland (Schweizer Hitparade)	9
UK Singles (OCC)	149

1998 year-end chart performance for "María"
Chart (1998)	Position
Australia (ARIA)	1

== Certifications and sales ==
Certifications and sales for "María"
Region	Certification	Certified units/sales
Argentina (CAPIF)	Platinum	100,000^{^}
Australia (ARIA)	Platinum	70,000^{^}
Belgium (BRMA)	2× Platinum	100,000^{*}
France (SNEP)	Diamond	1,400,000
Germany (BVMI)	Gold	250,000^{^}
Netherlands (NVPI)	Gold	50,000^{^}
Spain	—	185,000
Sweden (GLF)	Gold	15,000^{^}
Switzerland (IFPI Switzerland)	Gold	25,000^{^}
Summaries
Europe	—	2,500,000
Worldwide	—	5,000,000
^{*} Sales figures based on certification alone.^{^} Shipments figures based on certification alone.

== Release history ==
Release dates and formats for "María"
Region	Date	Format(s)	Label	Ref.
Mexico	November 21, 1995	Promotional CD single	Columbia	
Europe	May 12, 1997	CD maxi-single	Columbia	
Japan	March 25, 1998	CD maxi-single	Epic	
Australia	June 1, 1998	CD maxi-single	Columbia	

== See also ==
- List of best-selling Latin singles
- List of best-selling singles in France
- List of number-one singles in Australia during the 1990s
- List of number-one singles of 1997 (France)
- List of UK top-ten singles in 1997
- Ultratop 40 number-one hits of 1997
