= Darren Kennedy =

Irish television presenter

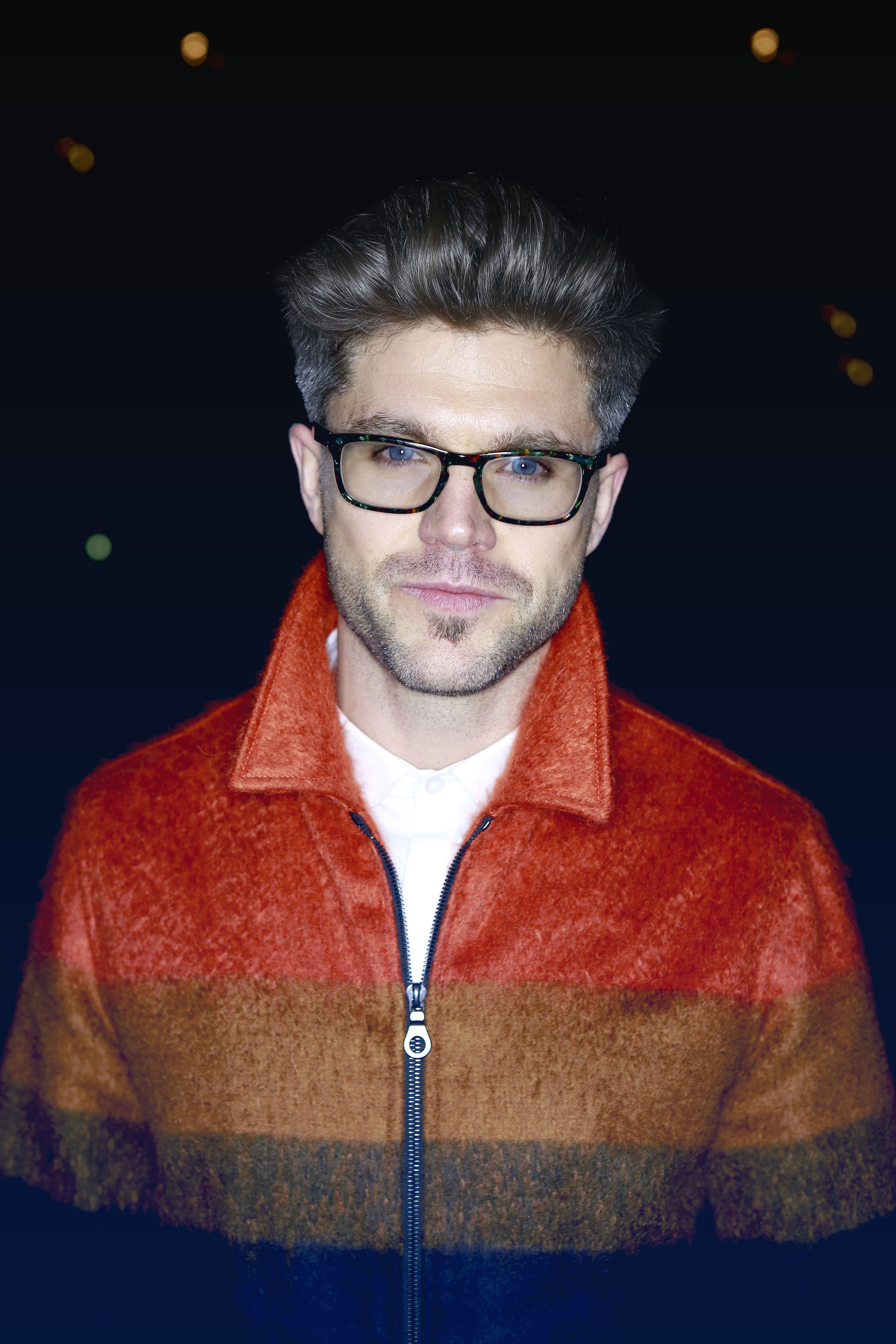
- Born: 12 January 1981 (age 45); Dublin, Ireland
- Education: Dublin Institute of Technology, University of Bordeaux, Central St Martins
- Occupations: Television presenter, Style Expert, Entrepreneur
- Years active: 2006–Present
- Employer(s): RTÉ, BBC, ITV
- Height: 6 ft 1 in (1.86 m)
- Website: www.darrenkennedy.co.uk

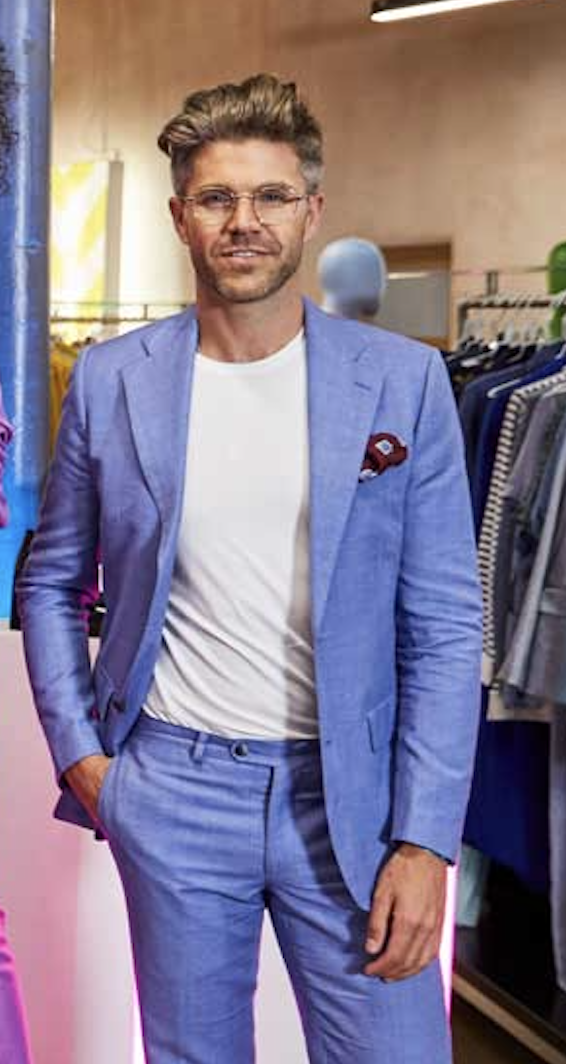
TV presenter Darren Kennedy

Darren Kennedy (born 12 January 1981) is an Irish television presenter, style & design expert and entrepreneur from Dublin now based between Los Angeles, New York and Dublin. He has hosted television shows on BBC, ITV and RTÉ. Kennedy is Contributing Editor to US-title The Daily Front Row. He is the creator and co-founder of men's grooming brand Kennedy & Co.

== Career ==
=== Broadcasting ===
Kennedy began his career in Ireland as a reporter on the Gerry Ryan show 2FM and TV's Operation Transformation on RTÉ One, and hosted celebrity entertainment series #Trending on RTÉ 2 and regularly presented on ITV 1's This Morning alongside Holly Willoughby and Phillip Schofield.

He co-created and presented 'Gay Daddy', and co-presented and devised The Unemployables series with Jennifer Maguire. Well known and respected for his aesthetic & sense of style, his home was featured in Celebrity Home of The Year on RTE One and he hosted the six-part series Buyers Bootcamp and Dream House, both on Virgin Media.

In 2019 he was a contestant on Dancing With The Stars. In March 2020, he was announced as one of the Fab Five on BBC One's new flagship makeover series You Are What You Wear with Rylan Clark. In January 2021, he took part in Celebrity Mastermind.

As of January 2023, he is presenting Celebrity Closets from Los Angeles on ITV's Lorraine, where he interviews celebrities at home as they take viewers on a trip down memory lane via their wardrobes.

In April 2023, Kennedy launched his podcast The Number which he created, produces and hosts. On it he explores the question can a life be measured in numbers? Each week, he asks his guests their seven most significant numbers and how they've shaped their lives.

Kennedy is on-going regular guest co-host of Virgin Media Television's flagship live evening talk show The Six O Clock Show. The lively evening talk show features a mix of chat, live music, cooking, entertainment, showbiz, human interest and consumer technology news. His interview alongside co-host Katja Mia with Nikki Hayes as she opened up on her struggles with mental health and her journey to recovery was nominated for an Audience Choice Award at the 2025 Shine Mental Health Media Awards.

In 2024, he became a regular contributor to NBC's Access Daily.

In October 2024, Kennedy was appointed Contributing Editor to The Daily.

In June 2026, Kennedy launched "Heyy Gay!", a digital first LGBTQ dating series for which he serves as creator, executive producer and host. The format follows Kennedy as the ultimate IRL wingman. It focuses on spontaneous, face to face matchmaking as an alternative to dating apps. The first "Heyy Gay!" soirée took place in July 2026 in Los Angeles.

He writes a popular weekly Interior Design column in the Sunday Independent LIFE magazine.

He is a prominent voice on LGBT rights and activism.

TV programme	Channel / Network
Lorraine: Celebrity Closets Host	Production Company: ITV Studios America Broadcaster: ITV
You Are What You Wear	Production Company: Multistory Broadcaster: BBC One
Buyers Bootcamp	Production Company: Broadcaster: Virgin Media One
Dancing with the Stars - Contestant	Production Company: Broadcaster: RTE
The Royal Wedding - Co-Presenter	Production Company: Broadcaster: RTE One
Xpose - Guest Studio Anchor	Production Company: Broadcaster: Virgin Media One (formerly TV3)
Dream House	Production Company: Broadcaster: RTE
The Peter Mark VIP Style Awards	Production Company: Broadcaster: TV3
What Britain Buys	Production Company: Sundog Pictures Broadcaster: Channel 4
The Power of TOWIE	Production Company: Lime Pictures Broadcaster: ITVbe
Celebrity Big Brother's Bit on the Side	Production Company: Endemol Broadcaster: Channel 4
Celebrity Mastermind	Production Company: Hat Trick Productions Broadcaster: BBC
The Unemployables	Production Company: CoCo Productions Broadcaster: RTE 2
The Xtra Factor	Production Company: Thames/ Syco Broadcaster: ITV 2
#Trending	Production Company: CoCo Productions Broadcaster: RTE 2
BAFTA Red Carpet Masterclass	Production Company: Broadcaster:
Topman & Google+	Production Company: Broadcaster:
This Morning	Production Company: ITV Broadcaster: ITV
Like A Virgin	Production Company: CoCo Productions Broadcaster: RTE 2
Gay Daddy	Production Company: CoCo Productions Broadcaster: RTE 2
Fox News	Production Company: Broadcaster: Fox News
Holiday Heaven on Earth	Production Company: Broadcaster: Channel 5
Global Entrepreneurship Week	Production Company: Broadcaster: Channel 4
Project Parent	Production Company: Broadcaster: BBC/ CBBC
This Morning's Digital Download	Production Company: Broadcaster: ITV
Irish Film & Television Awards red carpet (IFTAS)	Production Company: Broadcaster:

=== Dancing with the Stars ===
In 2019, Kennedy took part in the third series of Dancing with the Stars on RTÉ. He was partnered with Karen Byrne, they competed into the fifth week.

Professional partner
Karen Byrne; Average: 16.5; Place: 9th

Week No.	Dance/Song	Judges' score			Total	Result
Week No.	Dance/Song	Redmond	Barry	Benson	Total	Result
1	Tango / "Sharp Dressed Man"	5	5	6	16	No elimination
2	No dance performed					No elimination
3	Jive / "Fun, Fun, Fun"	4	5	5	14	Safe
4	Charleston / "I Wanna Be Like You"	6	6	6	18	Safe
5	Salsa / "María"	6	6	6	18	Eliminated

=== Style ===
He designed a contemporary suiting and outerwear collection in collaboration with Irish tailor Louis Copeland which produced six sell-out collections. He is a fashion ambassador for the UK highstreet optician Specsavers. He regularly works with some fashion brands including Hugo Boss, Tommy Hilfiger and Topman. He has hosted for BAFTA, GQ, several seasons of London Fashion Week Festival for the British Fashion Council and live on the red carpet for the Brit Awards. Darren also regularly contributes to Beverly Hills Lifestyle magazine.

=== Entrepreneur ===
Kennedy's first solo venture was in his early twenties when he established a style bureau providing consultancy services to personal and corporate clients including blue chip companies Google, Tommy Hilfiger and BMW. An offshoot of this business developed into an online magazine Help My Style.

In November 2018, he launched Irish Made, skin and hair care brand Kennedy & Co. In 2020, the brand announced it had signed a deal to be distributed across the Middle East.

=== Awards ===
Kennedy is regularly nominated in most Stylish Man award categories. He was voted winner of Ireland's Most Stylish Man at the VIP (magazine) Style Awards in 2013. He subsequently went on to host the televised awards show for three consecutive years on TV3.

In 2016 he was nominated for the IFTA Film & Drama Awards TV Rising Star award.

Kennedy was named Most influential Fashion Journalist in Ireland in the annual Murray Twitter Index.

== Personal life ==
Kennedy is openly gay.
