= Paul Brogan =

Dublin Gaelic footballer

Personal information
- Native name: Pól Ó Brógáin (Irish)
- Born: 5 July 1986 (age 40) Dublin, Ireland

Sport
- Sport: Gaelic football
- Position: Back
Club
- Years: Club
- Oliver Plunketts/Eoghan Ruadh
Inter-county
Years	County	Apps (scores)
2008–2012	Dublin	0 (0–00)
Inter-county titles
- Leinster titles: 3
- NFL: 1
- All Stars: 0

Paul Brogan (born 5 July 1976) is a Gaelic footballer who plays for the St Oliver Plunketts Eoghan Ruadh club and formerly for the Dublin county team.

== Early life ==
From a famous footballing family, Brogan is the son of former All-Ireland winning and All Star player Bernard Brogan Snr and is the brother of former Dublin players Alan and Bernard Jnr. His uncle Jim Brogan was also an inter-county footballer for Dublin. Like most of his family, Brogan has attended St Declan's College on Navan Road.

== Career ==
He made his senior inter-county debut as a substitute for Dublin in the 2008 O'Byrne Cup against Wicklow. He made his first start for Dublin against Westmeath in the quarter-final of the O'Byrne Cup and scored a point in the game. Brogan won the Dublin AFL Division 1 title with his club St Oliver Plunketts Eoghan Ruadh. It was the first league title in the club's history.

He was on Dublin's winning team for the 2008 O'Byrne Cup winning team which defeated Longford in the final. He was part of the Dublin panel that won the 2011 All-Ireland senior football championship. He was dropped from the Dublin senior football panel in October 2012.

== Media appearances ==
In January 2023, Brogan was announced as a contestant in the sixth series of Dancing with the Stars. He was partnered with Georgian ballroom and Latin dancer, Salome Chachua. On 5 February 2023, they were the third couple eliminated from the competition.

== Honours ==
Dublin

- All-Ireland Senior Football Championship (1): 2011
- Leinster Senior Football Championship (3): 2008, 2009, 2011
- O'Byrne Cup (1): 2008
