= Aengus Mac Grianna =

Irish journalist and television newsreader

- Born: Raheny, Dublin, Ireland
- Occupation: Journalist
- Notable credit(s): RTÉ News: Nine O'Clock; RTÉ News
- Spouse: Terry Gill (m. 2014)

Aengus Mac Grianna is a former Irish newsreader for RTÉ. Mac Grianna was born in Raheny, a suburb in north Dublin, to an Irish-speaking family. His father was a scientist and his mother was a teacher. Mac Grianna was educated solely through Irish. He broadcast in both Irish and English. Mac Grianna has presented the Oireachtas Media Awards. He lives on an alpaca farm in County Meath just outside Ashbourne with his husband Terry Gill whom he married in June 2014. His first job was in the Arnotts Sports Department where he earned £80 per week. He is a fan of Desperate Housewives and Coronation Street and supports Dublin and Manchester United. Mac Grianna was considered a favourite to replace iconic newsreader Anne Doyle when she retired on 25 December 2011.

On 9 January 2013, a video of Mac Grianna surfaced on YouTube showing him being caught unaware whilst applying some make-up to his face as he prepared for a live bulletin on RTÉ's digital news channel News Now. The presenter did not realise the cameras were rolling after a technical error meant that footage of Mac Grianna readying himself for the broadcast was shown instead of the title sequence. Aengus commented on it by saying ".. I saw the fun in it. You have to laugh at yourself as well, I think that’s important." Prior to this incident, Mac Grianna has had several previous incidents on air.

In August 2013, he came second in Celebrity MasterChef Ireland.

Aengus Mac Grianna presented his last Six One News on St. Patrick's Day 2018.

In 2022, Mac Grianna appeared on the fifth series of the Irish version of Dancing With the Stars.
