= Ultratop 40 number-one hits of 1997 =

This is a list of songs that topped the Belgian Walloon (francophone) Ultratop 40 in 1997.

Date	Title	Artist
January 4	"Freed from Desire"	Gala
January 11	"Freed from Desire"	Gala
January 18	"Freed from Desire"	Gala
January 25	"Freed from Desire"	Gala
February 1	"Freed from Desire"	Gala
February 8	"Freed from Desire"	Gala
February 15	"Un-Break My Heart"	Toni Braxton
February 22	"Un-Break My Heart"	Toni Braxton
March 1	"Un-Break My Heart"	Toni Braxton
March 8	"Un-Break My Heart"	Toni Braxton
March 15	"Un-Break My Heart"	Toni Braxton
March 22	"Let a Boy Cry"	Gala
March 29	"Let a Boy Cry"	Gala
April 5	"Let a Boy Cry"	Gala
April 12	"Let a Boy Cry"	Gala
April 19	"Let a Boy Cry"	Gala
April 26	"Let a Boy Cry"	Gala
May 3	"Let a Boy Cry"	Gala
May 10	"María"	Ricky Martin
May 17	"María"	Ricky Martin
May 24	"María"	Ricky Martin
May 31	"María"	Ricky Martin
June 7	"María"	Ricky Martin
June 14	"María"	Ricky Martin
June 21	"María"	Ricky Martin
June 28	"María"	Ricky Martin
July 5	"María"	Ricky Martin
July 12	"María"	Ricky Martin
July 19	"Alane"	Wes
July 26	"Alane"	Wes
August 2	"Alane"	Wes
August 9	"Alane"	Wes
August 16	"Alane"	Wes
August 17	"Alane"	Wes
August 23	"Alane"	Wes
August 30	"Alane"	Wes
September 6	"Alane"	Wes
September 13	"Men in Black"	Will Smith
September 20	"Something About the Way You Look Tonight/Candle in the Wind 1997"	Elton John
September 27	"Something About the Way You Look Tonight/Candle in the Wind 1997"	Elton John
October 4	"Something About the Way You Look Tonight/Candle in the Wind 1997"	Elton John
October 11	"Something About the Way You Look Tonight/Candle in the Wind 1997"	Elton John
October 18	"Something About the Way You Look Tonight/Candle in the Wind 1997"	Elton John
October 25	"Something About the Way You Look Tonight/Candle in the Wind 1997"	Elton John
November 1	"Barbie Girl"	Aqua
November 8	"Barbie Girl"	Aqua
November 15	"Barbie Girl"	Aqua
November 22	"Barbie Girl"	Aqua
November 29	"Barbie Girl"	Aqua
December 6	"Barbie Girl"	Aqua
December 13	"Barbie Girl"	Aqua
December 20	"Savoir aimer"	Florent Pagny
December 27	"Savoir aimer"	Florent Pagny

== See also ==
- 1997 in music
