= Salome Chachua =

Georgian dancer and choreographer (born 1990)

Salome Tchatchua
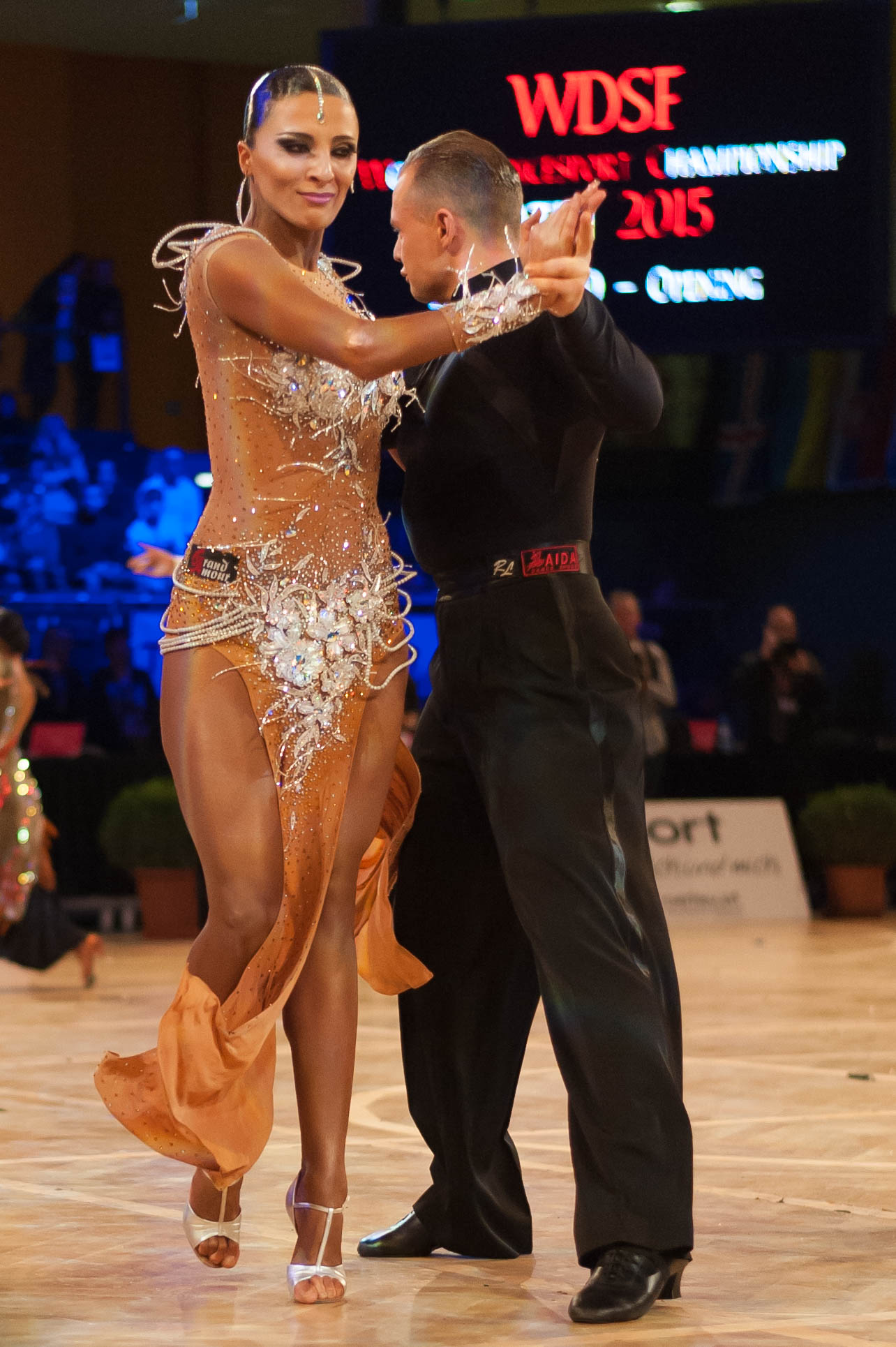
- Chachua in Austria
- Born: 23 June 1990 (age 35); Tbilisi, Georgia
- Occupations: Dancer; Choreographer; Television personality

Salome Chachua (Georgian: სალომე ჭაჭუა Salome Ch’ach’ua, born 23 June 1990) is a Georgian ballroom and Latin dancer and choreographer.

== Career ==
Chachua is a seven-time Georgian Latin dancing champion. From 2004 to 2006, Chachua represented Georgia in several Junior World dance competitions. She was at one time ranked 57th in WDC Professional Latin and 73rd in WDSF RLS Latin.

== So You Think You Can Dance ==
In 2016, Chachua was a judge on the Georgian version of the dance competition show So You Think You Can Dance.

== Dancing with the Stars ==
=== Georgia ===
Between 2012 and 2018, Chachua appeared as a professional dancer on seven non-consecutive seasons of the Georgian version of Dancing with the Stars, reaching the final with her celebrity partners three separate times.

Series	Partner	Place
1	Levan Rostoshvili	4th
2	Giorgi Vardosanidze	2nd
3	Toli Boisa	5th
5	Zura Gorgadze	5th
6	Andria Gvelesiani	2nd
7	Irakli Makatsaria	2nd
8	Giorgi Giligashvili	4th

=== Ireland ===
On 22 December 2021, Chachua was announced as one of the new professionals to join the fifth series of the Irish version of Dancing with the Stars. Her partner was rugby union player, Jordan Conroy. Chachua and Conroy performed for the first time on the second week of the show scoring one of the highest scores of the week. They reached the finals, finishing as joint runners-up behind Nina Carberry and Pasquale La Rocca.

Chachua returned for the sixth series in 2023, partnered with former Dublin GAA footballer, Paul Brogan. They were the third couple to be eliminated from the competition.

Chachua returned for the seventh series in 2024, partnered with Wild Youth singer, David Whelan. They reached the final finishing as joint runners-up behind Jason Smyth & Karen Byrne.

Chachua returned for the eighth series in 2025, partnered with Mrs. Brown's Boys actor, Danny O'Carroll.

On 23 November 2025, Chachua announced that she was leaving the show.

Series	Partner	Place	Average
5	Jordan Conroy	2nd	25.7
6	Paul Brogan	9th	18.4
7	David Whelan	2nd	27.0
8	Danny O'Carroll	2nd	24.7

Highest and Lowest Scoring Per Dance

Dance	Partner	Highest	Partner	Lowest
American Smooth	Jordan Conroy	28	Paul Brogan	15
Cha-cha-cha	David Whelan	24	Jordan Conroy	20
Charleston	Danny O'Carroll	29	David Whelan	24
Contemporary Ballroom	Jordan Conroy	30	Danny O'Carroll	27
Foxtrot	Jordan Conroy	19	Danny O'Carroll	16
Jive	David Whelan	30	Danny O'Carroll	17
Paso Doble	Jordan Conroy	30	Danny O'Carroll	25
Quickstep	David Whelan	26	Jordan Conroy	19
Rumba	David Whelan	28		
Salsa	David Whelan	30	Jordan Conroy	22
Samba	Jordan Conroy	24	Paul Brogan	14
Showdance	Jordan Conroy; David Whelan	30	Danny O'Carroll	27
Tango	Danny O'Carroll	26	Paul Brogan	16
Viennese Waltz	Danny O'Carroll	25	David Whelan	24
Waltz	Paul Brogan	20		

Series 5 – with celebrity partner Jordan Conroy

Week No.	Dance/Song	Judges' score			Total	Result
Week No.	Dance/Song	Redmond	Barry	Gourounlian	Total	Result
1	No dance performed	-	-	-	-	No elimination
2	Salsa / "Take You Dancing"	7	7	8	22	No elimination
3	Quickstep / "Lightning Bolt"	6	6	7	19	Safe
4	Cha-cha-cha / "I Like to Move It"	6	7	7	20	Safe
5	Paso Doble / "Paint It Black"	9	9	9	27	Safe
6	Foxtrot / "Isn't She Lovely"	7	6	6	19	No elimination
7	Jive / "Runaway Baby"	9	10	10	29	Safe
8	Contemporary Ballroom / "High Hopes"	10	10	10	30	Bottom two
9	Samba / "Magalenha"	8	8	8	24	Bottom two
10^{1}	Charleston / "Walk Like An Egyptian"; Team Dance / "Cuba"	9; 9	10; 9	10; 9	29; 27	Safe
11	American Smooth / "I Get the Sweetest Feeling"; Bust-a-Move Marathon / "I'm So Excited"	9 Awarded	9; 5	10 points	28; 33	Safe
12	Paso Doble / "Paint It Black"; Showdance / "Fire it Up"	10; 10	10; 10	10; 10	30; 30	Runners-up

^{1}In week 10, Chachua tested positive for COVID-19, so her partner, Jordan Conroy danced with Emily Barker.

Series 6 – with celebrity partner Paul Brogan

Week No.	Dance/Song	Judges' score			Total	Result
Week No.	Dance/Song	Redmond	Barry	Gourounlian	Total	Result
1	American Smooth / "Come Fly With Me"	4	5	6	15	No elimination
2	Samba / "Get Busy"	4	5	5	14	No elimination
3	Waltz / "Take It to the Limit"	6	7	7	20	Safe
4	Charleston / "A Star Is Born"	9	9	9	27	Safe
5	Tango / "Locked Out of Heaven"	5	5	6	16	Eliminated

Series 7 – with celebrity partner David Whelan

Week No.	Dance/Song	Judges' score			Total	Result
Week No.	Dance/Song	Redmond	Barry	Gourounlian	Total	Result
1	Tango / "Bad Habits"	7	8	8	23	No elimination
2	Charleston / "Bad Boy Good Man"	8	8	8	24	No elimination
3	Viennese Waltz / "Good"	8	8	8	24	Safe
4	Jive / "You Never Can Tell/Misirlou"	9	9	9	27	Safe
5	Cha-cha-cha / "Lil Boo Thang"	8	8	8	24	Safe
6	Rumba / "Fields of Gold"	9	10	9	28	No elimination
7	Quickstep / "Almost Like Being in Love"	8	9	9	26	Safe
8	Contemporary Ballroom / "Paradise"	9	9	10	28	Safe
9	Paso Doble / "Whole Lotta Love"; Team Dance / "A Little Party Never Killed Nobody (All We Got)"	9; 9	9; 10	10; 10	28; 29	Safe
10	Salsa / "Wrapped Up"; Scare-a-thon / "Dead Ringer for Love"	10; Awarded	10; 3	10 points	30; 33	Bottom two
11	Jive / "You Never Can Tell/Misirlou"; Showdance / "All That Really Matters"	10; 10	10; 10	10; 10	30; 30	Runners-up

Series 8 – with celebrity partner Danny O'Carroll

Week No.	Dance/Song	Judges' score				Total	Result
Week No.	Dance/Song	Redmond	Byrne	Barry	Gourounlian	Total	Result
1	Foxtrot / "Obviously"	5	6	5	6	22	No elimination
2	Charleston / "Don't Blame it On Me"	9	9	9	9	36	No elimination
3	Jive / "C'mon Everybody"	5	7	6	6	24	Safe
4	Paso Doble / "Now We Are Free (Remix)"	8	8	-	9	25	Safe
5	Cha-cha-cha / "She's a Lady"	7	8	8	8	31	No elimination
6	Contemporary Ballroom / "Arcade"	9	9	9	9	36	Safe
7	Viennese Waltz / "This Year's Love"	8	8	9	9	34	Safe
8	Salsa / "All Night Long (All Night)"	8	8	8	9	33	Bottom two
9	Quickstep / "Ring of Fire"; Team Dance / "Timber"	7; 9	8; 10	7; 10	8; 10	30; 39	Safe
10	Tango / "Poison"; Scare-a-thon / "Time Warp"	9 Couple	9 awarded	8; 2	9 points	35; 37	Safe
11	Charleston / "Don't Blame it On Me"; Showdance / "Rock This Party (Everybody Dance Now)"	10; 9	10; 10	9; 9	10; 9	39; 37	Runners-up
