= Karen Byrne =

Irish dancer and choreographer (born 1992)

- Born: 30 May 1992 (age 33); Dublin, Ireland
- Occupations: Dancer; Choreographer
- Known for: Dancing with the Stars (Irish series)
- Height: 1.65 m (5 ft 5 in)
- Partner: Jake Carter (2018–present)

Karen Byrne (born 30 May 1992) is an Irish dancer and choreographer. She is known as being a judge and, previously, a professional dancer on the Irish version of Dancing with the Stars.

== Early life ==
Byrne was born in Ballyfermot in Dublin. She has been dancing since the age of six.

== Dancing with the Stars ==
In 2017, Byrne was announced as one of the professional dancers for the first series of Dancing with the Stars. She was partnered with RTÉ broadcaster, Des Cahill. Despite being in the bottom half of the leader board throughout the entire competition, they reached the quarterfinals of the competition eventually finishing in 5th place.

In 2018, Byrne was partnered with singer-songwriter, Jake Carter. On 25 March 2018, Carter and Byrne were named the winners.

In 2019, Byrne was partnered with TV presenter and style entrepreneur, Darren Kennedy. They reached the fifth week of the competition, finishing in ninth place.

In 2020, Byrne partnered with Olympic gold medal-winning boxer, Michael Carruth. The couple reached the fifth week of the competition, meaning Byrne finished in ninth place for the second year in a row.

In 2022, Byrne partnered former professional cyclist, Nicolas Roche. They were eliminated in the quarterfinals, after a dance-off against Ellen Keane and Ervinas Merfeldas.

In 2023, Byrne partnered former rugby player, Shane Byrne. They were eliminated in the eighth week of the competition, after a dance-off against Panti Bliss and Denys Samson.

In 2024, Byrne partnered former Paralympic sprint runner, Jason Smyth. On 17 March 2024, Smyth & Byrne were named the winners, despite receiving the lowest scores for several weeks and in the Final.

Series	Partner	Place
1	Des Cahill	5th
2	Jake Carter	1st
3	Darren Kennedy	9th
4	Michael Carruth	9th
5	Nicolas Roche	6th
6	Shane Byrne	7th
7	Jason Smyth	1st

Highest and Lowest Scoring Per Dance

Dance	Partner	Highest	Partner	Lowest
American Smooth	Jake Carter	25	Michael Carruth	12
Cha-cha-cha	Jake Carter	24	Des Cahill; Shane Byrne	12
Charleston	Jake Carter	30	Bernard O'Shea^{1}	13
Contemporary Ballroom	Jake Carter	30	Jason Smyth	24
Foxtrot	Nicolas Roche	21	Des Cahill	16
Jive	Jake Carter	28	Nicolas Roche	11
Paso Doble	Des Cahill	18	Michael Carruth	14
Quickstep	Jake Carter	21	Shane Byrne	17
Rumba	Jake Carter	26	Jason Smyth	18
Salsa	Shane Byrne	21	Des Cahill	14
Samba	Jason Smyth	28	Michael Carruth	11
Showdance	Jake Carter; Jason Smyth	30		
Tango	Jason Smyth	27	Michael Carruth	13
Viennese Waltz	Jake Carter	28	Nicolas Roche	16
Waltz	Jason Smyth	21	Nicolas Roche	17

^{1} These scores was awarded during Switch-Up Week.

=== Series 1 ===
Celebrity partner
Des Cahill; Average: 16.7; Place: 5th

Week No.	Dance/Song	Judges' score			Total	Result
Week No.	Dance/Song	Redmond	Barry	Benson	Total	Result
1	Foxtrot / "Moondance"	5	5	6	16	No elimination
2	No dance performed	-	-	-	-	No elimination
3	Paso Doble / "Malagueña"	6	6	6	18	Safe
4	Salsa / "Soul Bossa Nova"	4	5	5	14	Safe
5	Tango / "Jealousy"	5	7	6	18	Safe
6	Cha-cha-cha / "Don't Go Breaking My Heart"	4	4	4	12	Safe
7	Samba / "Mas que Nada"	5	5	5	15	No elimination Switch-Up Week with Aidan O'Mahony
8	Viennese Waltz / "The Marino Waltz"	6	7	6	19	Safe
9	American Smooth / "Uptown Girl"	5	6	6	17	Safe
10	Jive / "Do You Love Me"; The Ballroom Blitz / "The Ballroom Blitz"	6 Extra	6; 1	7 Point	19; 20	Eliminated

=== Series 2 ===
Celebrity partner
Jake Carter; Average: 26.3; Place: 1st

Week No.	Dance/Song	Judges' score			Total	Result
Week No.	Dance/Song	Redmond	Barry	Benson	Total	Result
1	Salsa / "Reggaetón Lento (Remix)"	6	6	7	19	No elimination
2	No dance performed	-	-	-	-	No elimination
3	Quickstep / "Knee Deep in My Heart"	7	7	7	21	Safe
4	Cha-cha-cha / "The Power of Love"	8	8	8	24	Safe
5	Contemporary Ballroom / "Sign of the Times"	9	9	9	27	Safe
6	Charleston / "Lollipop"	3	5	5	13	No elimination Switch-Up Week with Bernard O'Shea
7	Tango / "La cumparsita"	8	9	9	26	Safe
8	Viennese Waltz / "You'll Never Walk Alone"	9	9	10	28	Safe
9	Jive / "Rock Around the Clock (Swing Cats Remix)"; Team Dance / "On the Floor"	9; 10	9; 10	9; 10	27; 30	Safe
10	Charleston / "Friend Like Me"; Swing-a-thon / "You Can't Stop the Beat"	10; Extra	10; 5	10; Points	30; 35	Safe
11	Rumba / "Slow Hands"; American Smooth / "Let's Face the Music and Dance"	9; 8	8; 8	9; 9	26; 25	Bottom two
12	Contemporary Ballroom / "Sign of the Times"; Jive / "Rock Around the Clock (Swing Cats Remix)"; Showdance / "Mad World"	10; 9; 10	10; 9; 10	10; 10; 10	30; 28; 30	Winners

=== Series 3 ===
Celebrity partner
Darren Kennedy; Average: 16.5; Place: 9th

Week No.	Dance/Song	Judges' score			Total	Result
Week No.	Dance/Song	Redmond	Barry	Benson	Total	Result
1	Tango / "Sharp Dressed Man"	5	5	6	16	No elimination
2	No dance performed	-	-	-	-	No elimination
3	Jive / "Fun, Fun, Fun"	4	5	5	14	Safe
4	Charleston / "I Wanna Be Like You"	6	6	6	18	Safe
5	Salsa / "María"	6	6	6	18	Eliminated

=== Series 4 ===
Celebrity partner
Michael Carruth; Average: 12.5; Place: 9th

Week No.	Dance/Song	Judges' score			Total	Result
Week No.	Dance/Song	Redmond	Barry	Benson	Total	Result
1	American Smooth / "I'm Shipping Up to Boston"	3	4	5	12	No elimination
2	No dance performed	-	-	-	-	No elimination
3	Samba / "It's Not Unusual"	3	4	4	11	Safe
4	Paso Doble / "Eye of the Tiger"	4	5	5	14	Safe
5	Tango / "Gold"	4	4	5	13	Eliminated

=== Series 5 ===
Celebrity partner
Nicolas Roche; Average: 17.4; Place: 6th

Week No.	Dance/Song	Judges' score			Total	Result
Week No.	Dance/Song	Redmond	Barry	Gourounlian	Total	Result
1	Jive / "Blinding Lights"	3	4	4	11	No elimination
2	No dance performed	-	-	-	-	No elimination
3	Viennese Waltz / "Unplayed Piano"	5	5	6	16	Safe
4	American Smooth / "Singin' in the Rain"	6	6	7	19	Safe
5	Samba / "Fantasy"	5	5	5	15	Safe
6	Quickstep / "Hey Brother"	6	6	7	19	No elimination
7	Waltz / "Love Ain't Here Anymore"	5	6	6	17	Safe
8	Tango / No dance performed	-	-	-	-	Given bye
9	Tango / "Trumpet Tango"	7	7	7	21	Safe
10	Foxtrot / "I Love Paris"; Team Dance / "Cuba"	7; 9	7; 9	7; 9	21; 27	Eliminated

=== Series 6 ===
Celebrity partner
Shane Byrne; Average: 18.5; Place: 7th

Week No.	Dance/Song	Judges' score			Total	Result
Week No.	Dance/Song	Redmond	Barry	Gourounlian	Total	Result
1	Quickstep / "Help!"	6	5	6	17	No elimination
2	Cha-cha-cha / "Hey Baby"	3	4	5	12	No elimination
3	Paso Doble / "Born to Be Wild"	5	5	5	15	Safe
4	Tango / "Wreck-It, Wreck-It Ralph"	6	6	6	18	Safe
5	Salsa / "Cuban Pete"	7	7	7	21	Safe
6	Viennese Waltz / "We Are the Champions"	7	8	8	23	No elimination
7	Jive / "Land Of 1,000 Dances"	6	7	7	20	Safe
8	American Smooth / "Luck Be a Lady Tonight"	7	7	8	22	Eliminated

=== Series 7 ===
Celebrity partner
Jason Smyth; Average: 22.2; Place: 1st

Week No.	Dance/Song	Judges' score			Total	Result
Week No.	Dance/Song	Redmond	Barry	Gourounlian	Total	Result
1	Foxtrot / "They Can't Take That Away from Me"	5	6	6	17	No elimination
2^{1}	Paso Doble / "Run to You"	5	6	6	17	No elimination
3	Contemporary Ballroom / "Show Me What I'm Looking For"	8	8	8	24	Safe
4	Rumba / "With These Hands"	6	6	6	18	Safe
5	Salsa / "Don't Stop Dancing"	6	6	6	18	Safe
6	Viennese Waltz / "Daughters"	6	7	7	20	No elimination
7	Samba / "Rhythm Divine"	8	8	7	23	Safe
8	Waltz / "Watermark"	7	7	7	21	Safe
9	Jive / "Runaway"; Team Dance / "A Little Party Never Killed Nobody (All We Got)"	7; 9	8; 10	8; 10	23; 29	Safe
10	Tango / "Disturbia"; Scare-a-thon / "Dead Ringer for Love"	9 Awarded	9; 2	9 Points	27; 29	Safe
11	Samba / "Rhythm Divine"; Showdance / "Go the Distance"	9; 10	10; 10	9; 10	28; 30	Winners

^{1}Byrne did not perform in week 2 due to illness. Smyth performed his dance with Juliia Vasylenko instead.

== Personal life ==
Byrne was in a relationship with professional dancer, Wojtek Potaszkin for eight years. Since their time on the show together, Byrne has been dating her Series 2 partner, Jake Carter. The couple announced their engagement on 9 March 2025.
