= Erica-Cody =

Irish R&B singer-songwriter

- Born: Erica-Cody Kennedy-Smith; 27 July 1996 (age 29); Dublin, Ireland
- Origin: Ireland
- Genres: R&B; hip hop
- Years active: 2014–present
- Website: Erica-Cody on Facebook

Erica-Cody Kennedy Smith (born 27 July 1996) is an Irish R&B singer and songwriter.

== Early life ==
Erica-Cody was born Erica-Cody Kennedy-Smith in Rotunda Hospital, Dublin and grew up in Baldoyle. Her mother is Irish, while her father is an African-American from South Carolina. As a teenager, Cody had hoped to become a professional basketball player, until an anterior cruciate ligament injury at age 18 ruled that out. She was formally a proud Member of the Bayside Scout group in North Dublin. She attended the Billie Barry Stage School and then BIMM Dublin, studying vocals.

== Career ==
During her time at Billie Barry Stage School, she had her first live gig at age 15 as the support act for WizKid. She released Addicted in 2017. Erica-Cody played at Longitude, Electric Picnic, as well as supporting Jessie J and En Vogue in 2018. She released her EP Leoness in April 2019. Her style has been described as close to that of TLC and Aaliyah. Cody's experiences of racism in Ireland led to her launching a campaign called Don't Touch My Hair (DTMH). She was one of the artists featured in Hot Press's Lockdown Sessions in April 2020.

In 2020, Cody took part in the Black Lives Matter protests in Dublin and spoke publicly about racism she and others have experienced in Ireland. She also spoke about how her father's family in America have been affected by racism and prejudice. She was named one of Irish Country Magazine's Women to Watch in 2020.

In 2020, Cody was part of an Irish collective of female singers and musicians called Irish Women in Harmony, that recorded a version of the Cranberries song "Dreams" in aid of the charity SafeIreland, which deals with domestic abuse which had reportedly risen significantly during the COVID-19 lockdown. Portraits of her, taken during lockdown in spring 2020, appeared in the book Twilight Together: Portraits of Ireland at Home by photographer Ruth Medjber.

Cody made a cameo in an episode of the 2021 Netflix series Fate: The Winx Saga.

In 2022, Cody appeared on the fifth series of the Irish version of Dancing with the Stars. She reached the final of the competition with her professional partner, Denys Samson finishing as runners-up to eventual winners, Nina Carberry and Pasquale La Rocca.

She was selected to compete in the Irish national final for the Eurovision Song Contest 2024 with the song "Love Me Like I Do", ultimately coming fourth.

== Discography ==
=== Extended plays ===
List of EPs, with selected details
Title	Details
Leoness	Released: April 2019; Label: ECM
Love & Light	Released: October 2021; Label: ECM
