= Cathy Kelly =

Irish writer

- Born: 12 September 1966 (age 60); Belfast, Northern Ireland
- Writing career
- Language: English
- Period: 1997–present
- Genre: Women's fiction
- Subjects: Women and relationships
- Notable awards: RoNA Award
- Website: www.cathykelly.co.uk

Cathy Kelly (born 12 September 1966) is an Irish writer of women's fiction and a former journalist. In 2001, her novel Someone Like You won the Romantic Novel of the Year Award from the Romantic Novelists' Association.

== Life and career ==
Born in Belfast but raised in Dublin, Kelly studied at a convent school. She was a journalist for the Sunday World, where she published an advice column and film criticism.

Kelly published her first book Woman To Woman, which became an international bestseller, in 1997. She published two more books, She’s The One and Never Too Late, before retiring from journalism in 2001.

Someone Like You, What She Wants, Just Between Us, and Best of Friends followed in successive years. Always and Forever was her first hardback to reach number one, then it topped the overall UK bestseller list in October 2005.

Her books Lessons in Heartbreak and Homecoming were shortlisted for the Eason Irish Popular Fiction Book of the Year at the Irish Book Awards. Once in a Lifetime topped the UK bestsellers again for multiple weeks. In March 2011, Homecoming did the same. Her short story collection, Christmas Magic, was the Christmas number one in Ireland. She is a number one bestseller in Australia and New Zealand, where she tours annually, and her works have been translated into many different languages.

Kelly is involved with many charities and has been an ambassador for UNICEF Ireland since 2005.

In 2022, Kelly appeared on the fifth series of the Irish version of Dancing With the Stars.

== Published works ==
=== Novels ===
- Woman to Woman (1997)
- She's the One (1998)
- Never Too Late (1999)
- Someone Like You (2000)
- What She Wants (2001)
- Just Between Us (2002)
- Best of Friends (2003)
- Always and Forever (2005)
- Past Secrets (2006)
- Lessons in Heartbreak (2008)
- Once in a Lifetime (2009)
- The Perfect Holiday (2010)
- Homecoming (2010)
- The House on Willow Street (2012)
- The Honey Queen (2013)
- It Started With Paris (2014)
- Between Sisters (2015)
- Secrets of a Happy Marriage (2017)

=== Novellas ===
- Letter from Chicago (2002)

=== Collections ===
- Christmas Magic (2011)
