= Jake Carter (singer) =

British singer (born 1998)

- Born: 11 August 1998 (age 27); Liverpool, England
- Occupation: Singer
- Years active: 2016–present
- Partner: Karen Byrne (2018–present)
- Relatives: Nathan Carter (brother)

Jacob Carter (born 11 August 1998) is a singer and the winner of series 2 of the Irish television dance competition Dancing with the Stars. He is the younger brother of country music singer Nathan Carter.

== Career ==
In 2017, Carter burst on to the Irish music scene after a performance on The Late Late Show with Ryan Tubridy, performing his first single, "Trouble". The single accompanied with a music video received a lot of air play on Irish country music radio stations and reached number one on the Irish Country Music iTunes chart.

He followed up "Trouble" with an EP titled Three Things.

Jake has starred in a number of stage productions over the years including pantomimes at the SSE Arena, Belfast, The Olympia Theatre, Dublin and The National Stadium Dublin. He has also toured in the hit comedy play Dirty Dusting in 2023 alongside X Factor contestant Mary Byrne

== Appearances ==
=== Aladdin ===
In December 2017, Carter appeared as the title character Aladdin in the Belfast SSE Arena pantomime production of Aladdin.

=== Dancing with the Stars ===
In December 2017, Carter was confirmed as one of the eleven celebrities taking part in the second series of the Irish version of Dancing with the Stars.

Carter was paired with Irish professional dancer, Karen Byrne for the series. They won the competition on 25 March 2018.

Dancing with the Stars performances

Week #	Dance/Song	Judges scores			Total	Result
Week #	Dance/Song	Redmond	Barry	Benson	Total	Result
1	Salsa / "Reggaetón Lento"	6	6	7	19	No elimination
2	No dance performed	No scores awarded				No elimination
3	Quickstep / "Knee Deep in My Heart"	7	7	7	21	Safe
4	Cha-cha-cha / "The Power of Love"	8	8	8	24	Safe
5	Contemporary Ballroom / "Sign of the Times"	9	9	9	27	Safe
6	Samba / "Mi Gente"	8	8	8	24	No elimination
7	Tango / "La cumparsita"	8	9	9	26	Safe
8	Viennese Waltz / "You'll Never Walk Alone"	9	9	10	28	Safe
9	Jive / "Rock Around the Clock (Swing Cats Remix)"	9	9	9	27	Safe
9	Team Dance: Freestyle / "On the Floor"	10	10	10	30	Safe
10	Charleston / "Friend Like Me"	10	10	10	30	Safe
10	Swing-a-thon: "You Can't Stop the Beat"	1st Place			5	Safe
11	Rumba / "Slow Hands"	9	8	9	26	Bottom two
11	American Smooth / "Let's Face the Music and Dance"	8	8	9	25	Bottom two
12	Contemporary Ballroom / "Sign of the Times"	10	10	10	30	Winner
12	Jive / "Rock Around the Clock (Swing Cats Remix)"	9	9	10	28	Winner
12	Showdance / "Mad World"	10	10	10	30	Winner

== Personal life ==
Carter was born to Ian and Noreen In 1998. He is the younger brother of Irish country singer Nathan Carter. Carter has toured extensively with his brother, most recently supporting him on Irish arena tour in March 2018. He also has a sister, Kiara Carter. Since 2018, Carter has been in a relationship with his Dancing with the Stars professional partner, Karen Byrne.

== Discography ==
=== EPs ===
- 2017: Three Things
  - 1. "Just Wanna Kiss You" (3:02) - 2. "Wild and Free" (3:22) 3. "Havin' a Party" (3:04) 4. "I Ain't Ever Coming Down" (3:05) 5. "Fallin' for You" (2:57)
- 2024: "Point of You"
  - 1. "Milk and Honey" - 2. "Loved Me Like You Do" 3. "Don't Forget" 4. "What Is Love" 5. "Jessica"

=== Singles / videography ===
- 2016: "Trouble"
- 2017: "Wild and Free"
- 2017: "Havin' a Party"
- 2017: "I Just Wanna Kiss You"
- 2018: "Fallin' for You"
- 2018: "The Little Things You Do"
- 2018: "2018"
- 2018: "Take Me Dancing" (feat. Una Healy)
- 2019: “Supernatural”
- 2019: "I Won't be Leaving"
- 2020 "Loving In Darkness"
- 2021 "Sink or Swim"
- 2022 "I Just Gotta Take Yo Home"
- 2022 "Who We Are"
- 2023 "Milk and Honey"
- 2024 "Loved Me Like You Do"
