= When We're Human =

2009 song by Michael-Leon Wooley, Bruno Campos, and Anika Noni Rose

Song by Michael-Leon Wooley, Bruno Campos, and Anika Noni Rose featuring Terence Blanchard

from the album The Princess and the Frog
- Released: November 23, 2009
- Genre: Jazz; soul; zydeco; R&B
- Length: 2:22
- Label: Walt Disney
- Songwriter: Randy Newman
- Producer: Randy Newman

"When We're Human" is a song from Disney Animation's 2009 film The Princess and the Frog. It is performed by Louis, Tiana, and Naveen (the latter two as frogs) while they are traversing a river through the bayou, fantasizing about what they will do when they become human. It was composed by Randy Newman and co-orchestrated by Jonathan Sacks, and features Michael-Leon Wooley (as Louis), Bruno Campos (as Prince Naveen) and Anika Noni Rose (as Tiana). It "is in the style of jazz", while having " a Mardi Gras party sound". The trumpet solos are performed by Terence Blanchard on behalf of his horn-blowing animated alter ego Louis the Alligator.

== Analysis ==
This song continues a recurring theme in Disney movies about characters' "humanity [being] cursed away". In particular, the song "Human Again" from Beauty and the Beast is thematically similar to this one. The Chicago Tribune notes "The song's story purpose is similar to "Human Again," cut from Disney's "Beauty and the Beast" but interpolated into the stage version", and also describes it as "in the spirit of "Hakuna Matata".

While "in no previous Disney film is any princess ever transformed into an animal", a "longing to be human" theme is evident in many Disney films, and "there is almost always a song about it: Ariel, The Beast and his servants, King Louie, and others all sing about wanting to be human---and therefore to be better than their lowly non-human form". In general, "animals who behave like humans in Disney films are always coded as protagonists...and humans who behave like animals are always antagonists", with "animal" often being coded as a non-white race. The two non-white leads when 2/3rds of the film as frogs and desire to be human - the implication is that they are not allowed to be coloured in their own film, and must "long to “fix” their doubly errant color and species throughout the film---again, with a significant racial subtext".

CBN says that the philosophy of karma is evident in the song, due to Tiana's lyric: "If you do your best, each and every day, good things are sure to come your way. What you give is what you get." Contemporary Black American Cinema: Race, Gender and Sexuality at the Movies notes that Louis sings about wanting to be human so he can play in a jazz band, due to his attempt to "jam...with the big boys" in his current form not "end[ing] well". The book says that this is a metaphor for "how blacks existed and learned to improvise under the condition of being deemed less than human". It says that under the surface, it can be read as "about he claim for black humanity".

== Plot ==
At this point in the movie, Louis, Tiana and Naveen are off down the bayou to visit Voodoo Queen Mama Odie, in order for her to change each of them into humans. There are no obstacles presented in their way, and they use this time to sing about what they will do once their wish has been granted. At face value, the song is about the characters "singing about their desires to become human again [while] reaching Mama Odie and reversing the curse of Dr. Facilier.

== Reception ==
Acting for Animators described "When We're Human" as "fun and lively production number". IGN deemed it "perhaps the least interesting song in the film". Entertainment Weekly described it as a song of "optimism", while Marshall and the Movies said the three characters are "jovially longing". FilmScore ClickTrack cited this as a prime example of the film's clever orchestrations, and described the musical style as "Dixieland". Collider deemed it a "standout" along with Ne-yo's closing theme "Never Knew I Needed". The Chicago Tribune said the "kicky" Randy Newman song "end[s] up being just sort of ... all right". Rope Of Silicon deemed it "perhaps the catchiest of the bunch". TrackSounds described it as "equally fun" when comparing it to "The Bare Necessities" from the Disney film The Jungle Book and rated it 5/5 stars. Game deemed it "incredibly energetic" and also noted it was "refreshingly evocative of The Jungle Book's 'Bare Necessities'". BlogCritics wrote "'When We’re Human' calls to mind 'The Bare Necessities'". DVDTalk said it was "the first perfect musical number in the movie", and "made [the reviewer] think of 'The Bare Necessities.'" Opinion Prone said it "seemed like a pretty typical Disney song." AnimatedReviews said it "is especially by the numbers, even if it is jaunty enough and fun to be seeing such material on the screen again". MovieMouseReviews said that during this song, "suddenly you feel that old fuzzy Disney musical feeling and Princess and the Frog becomes a success." Silver Screen Reviews said it, along with "Down in New Orleans", "really hit it out of the park in terms of context to the film and its characters".
