= Dancing with the Stars (Irish TV series) series 4 =

Dancing with the Stars
- Series 4
- Presented by: Jennifer Zamparelli; Nicky Byrne
- Judges: Julian Benson; Loraine Barry; Brian Redmond; Darren Bennett (guest)
- Celebrity winner: Lottie Ryan
- Professional winner: Pasquale La Rocca
- No. of episodes: 11

Release
- Original network: RTÉ One
- Original release: 5 January – 15 March 2020

Series chronology
- ← Previous; Series 3 Next → Series 5

Dancing with the Stars returned for a fourth series which began on 5 January 2020 on RTÉ One.

Nicky Byrne and Jennifer Zamparelli returned as hosts for a fourth and second series, respectively. The spinoff show Can't Stop Dancing did not return.

Brian Redmond, Loraine Barry and Julian Benson returned as judges.

In November 2019 it was confirmed the professional dancers, Curtis Pritchard, Ksenia Zsikhotska, Valeria Milova and Vitali Kozmin would not be returning for this series. They were replaced by Laura Nolan, Kylee Vincent, Pasquale La Rocca and Stephen Vincent.

The final on 15 March 2020 was won by Lottie Ryan alongside professional dancer Pasquale La Rocca.

== Couples ==
On 1 December 2019, Glenda Gilson was announced as the first celebrity to be taking part. The remaining celebrities were announced across the following week.

Celebrity	Known for	Professional	Status
Yewande Biala	Love Island contestant	Stephen Vincent	Eliminated 1st on 19 January 2020
Glenda Gilson	Television presenter	Robert Rowiński	Eliminated 2nd on 26 January 2020
Michael Carruth	Olympic boxer	Karen Byrne	Eliminated 3rd on 2 February 2020
Brian Dowling	Television presenter	Laura Nolan; Kai Widdrington (Week 6)	Eliminated 4th on 16 February 2020
Sinéad O'Carroll	B*Witched singer	Ryan McShane; John Nolan (Week 6)	Eliminated 5th on 23 February 2020
Mary Kennedy	Television presenter	John Nolan; Ryan McShane (Week 6)	Eliminated 6th on 1 March 2020
Fr. Ray Kelly	Priest & singer	Kylee Vincent; Giulia Dotta (Week 6)	Eliminated 7th on 8 March 2020
Aidan Fogarty	Former Kilkenny hurler	Emily Barker; Kylee Vincent (Week 6)	Runners-up on 15 March 2020
Gráinne Gallanagh	Miss Universe Ireland 2018	Kai Widdrington; Pasquale La Rocca (Week 6)	Runners-up on 15 March 2020
Ryan Andrews	Fair City actor	Giulia Dotta; Laura Nolan (Week 6)	Runners-up on 15 March 2020
Lottie Ryan	RTÉ 2fm broadcaster	Pasquale La Rocca; Emily Barker (Week 6)	Winners on 15 March 2020

== Scoring chart ==
Couple	Place	1	2	3	1/2+3	4	5	6	7	6+7	8	9	10	11
Lottie & Pasquale	1	—	20	26	46	28	22	26	28	54	29	29+27=56	28+5=33	30+30=60
Ryan & Giulia	2	21	—	23	44	28	26	25	27	52	30	27+24=51	30+4=34	29+30=59
Gráinne & Kai	2	—	18	20	38	21	27	18	25	43	30	25+24=49	22+2=24	27+30=57
Aidan & Emily	2	18	—	23	41	26	21	18	23	41	21	23+27=50	25+3=28	26+27=53
Fr. Ray & Kylee	5	8	—	6	14	9	10	14	15	29	14	13+27=40	15+1=16	
Mary & John	6	—	13	16	29	19	16	14	16	30	19	18+24=42		
Sinéad & Ryan	7	—	21	24	45	24	19	27	24	51	24			
Brian & Laura	8	16	—	20	36	18	17	23	15	38				
Michael & Karen	9	12	—	11	23	14	13							
Glenda & Robert	10	—	17	15	32	18								
Yewande & Stephen	11	—	16	12	28									

Red numbers indicate the couples with the lowest score for each week.
Green numbers indicate the couples with the highest score for each week.
the couple eliminated that week
the returning couple that was called forward and eventually last to be called safe, but was not necessarily in the bottom
the returning couple that finished in the bottom two and competed in the Dance-Off
the winning couple
the runner-up couple

=== Average chart ===
This table only counts for single dances scored on a traditional 30-points scale. It does not include the Team Dance or Marathon scores.

Rank by average	Place	Couple	Total points	Number of dances	Total average
1	1	Lottie & Pasquale	296	11	26.91
1	2	Ryan & Giulia	296	11	26.91
3	2	Gráinne & Kai	263	11	23.91
4	7	Sinéad & Ryan	163	7	23.29
5	2	Aidan & Emily	251	11	22.82
6	8	Brian & Laura	109	6	18.17
7	10	Glenda & Robert	50	3	16.67
8	6	Mary & John	131	8	16.38
9	11	Yewande & Stephen	28	2	14.00
10	9	Michael & Karen	50	4	12.50
11	5	Fr. Ray & Kylee	104	9	11.56

== Highest and lowest scoring performances ==
The highest and lowest performances in each dance according to the judges' scale are as follows.

Dance	Celebrity	Highest score	Celebrity	Lowest score
Tango	Aidan Fogarty	26	Michael Carruth	13
Cha-cha-cha	Lottie Ryan	30	Fr. Ray Kelly	6
Salsa	Lottie Ryan	28	Fr. Ray Kelly	14
Foxtrot	Gráinne Gallanagh	27	Fr. Ray Kelly	8
Charleston	Ryan Andrews; Gráinne Gallanagh	30	Fr. Ray Kelly	14
Waltz	Ryan Andrews	25	Glenda Gilson	15
Quickstep	Lottie Ryan	30	Fr. Ray Kelly	13
Jive	Ryan Andrews	28	Mary Kennedy	14
Rumba	Ryan Andrews	26	Gráinne Gallanagh	18
Paso doble	Lottie Ryan	28	Fr. Ray Kelly	9
American Smooth	Ryan Andrews	30	Michael Carruth	12
Contemporary Ballroom	Ryan Andrews	30	Glenda Gilson	18
Samba	Lottie Ryan; Ryan Andrews	29	Michael Carruth	11
Viennese waltz	Gráinne Gallanagh	30	Fr. Ray Kelly	10
Team Dance	Lottie Ryan; Aidan Fogarty; Fr. Ray Kelly	27	Ryan Andrews; Gráinne Gallanagh; Mary Kennedy	24
Rock-til-you-Drop Marathon	Lottie Ryan	5	Fr. Ray Kelly	1

== Couples' highest and lowest scoring dances ==
Couple	Highest scoring dance	Lowest scoring dance
Lottie & Pasquale	Quickstep & Cha-cha-cha (30)	Jive (20)
Aidan & Emily	Salsa (27)	Jive & Cha-cha-cha (18)
Gráinne & Kai	Viennese waltz & Charleston (30)	Tango & Rumba (18)
Ryan & Giulia	Contemporary Ballroom, Charleston & American Smooth (30)	Cha-cha-cha (21)
Fr. Ray & Kylee	Jive & American Smooth (15)	Cha-cha-cha (6)
Mary & John	American Smooth & Tango (19)	Foxtrot (13)
Sinéad & Ryan	Viennese waltz (27)	Cha-cha-cha (19)
Brian & Laura	Quickstep (23)	Tango (15)
Michael & Karen	Paso doble (14)	Samba (11)
Glenda & Robert	Contemporary Ballroom (18)	Waltz (15)
Yewande & Stephen	Salsa (16)	Viennese waltz (12)

== Weekly scores and songs ==
Unless indicated otherwise, individual judges scores in the charts below (given in parentheses) are listed in this order from left to right: Brian Redmond, Loraine Barry, Julian Benson.

=== Week 1 ===
Guest act: Series 3 champions, Mairéad Ronan and John Nolan performing a Viennese waltz to 'You Are the Reason'.

Running order (Men)

Couple	Score	Dance	Music
Aidan & Emily	18 (5, 6, 7)	Jive	"Tiger Feet"—New Hope Club
Michael & Karen	12 (3, 4, 5)	American Smooth	"I'm Shipping Up to Boston"—Dropkick Murphys
Ryan & Giulia	21 (6, 7, 8)	Cha-cha-cha	"If I Can't Have You"—Shawn Mendes
Fr. Ray & Kylee	8 (2, 2, 4)	Foxtrot	"Spirit in the Sky"—Doctor and the Medics
Brian & Laura	16 (5, 5, 6)	Salsa	"Juice"—Lizzo

=== Week 2 ===
Guest act: Vincent Simone and Ksenia Zsikhotska performed an Argentine tango to 'La cumparsita'.

Running order (Women)

Couple	Score	Dance	Music
Glenda & Robert	17 (5, 6, 6)	Cha-cha-cha	"Don't Start Now"—Dua Lipa
Gráinne & Kai	18 (6, 6, 6)	Tango	"Bang Bang"—Jessie J, Ariana Grande and Nicki Minaj
Sinéad & Ryan	21 (7, 7, 7)	American Smooth	"Bewitched"—Steve Lawrence
Yewande & Stephen	16 (5, 5, 6)	Salsa	"Solo Dance"—Martin Jensen
Mary & John	13 (3, 5, 5)	Foxtrot	"No Frontiers"—Mary Black
Lottie & Pasquale	20 (7, 6, 7)	Jive	"Whole Lotta Shakin' Goin' On"—Nicole Scherzinger

=== Week 3 ===
Running order

Couple	Score	Dance	Music	Result
Gráinne & Kai	20 (6, 7, 7)	Jive	"Dear Future Husband"—Meghan Trainor	Safe
Aidan & Emily	23 (7, 8, 8)	Foxtrot	"Half the World Away"—Oasis	Safe
Michael & Karen	11 (3, 4, 4)	Samba	"It's Not Unusual"—Tom Jones	Safe
Yewande & Stephen	12 (3, 4, 5)	Viennese waltz	"Lover"—Taylor Swift	Eliminated
Sinéad & Ryan	24 (8, 8, 8)	Paso doble	"El gato montés"—Arielle Dombasle	Safe
Glenda & Robert	15 (5, 5, 5)	Waltz	"I Never Loved a Man"—The Commitments	Safe
Fr. Ray & Kylee	6 (1, 2, 3)	Cha-cha-cha	"Save the Last Dance for Me"—Michael Bublé	Safe
Ryan & Giulia	23 (7, 8, 8)	Tango	"Bad Guy"—Billie Eilish	Safe
Lottie & Pasquale	26 (8, 9, 9)	Contemporary Ballroom	"Castles"—Freya Ridings	Safe
Mary & John	16 (5, 5, 6)	Salsa	"Ran Kan Kan"—Luis Lema	Last to be called safe
Brian & Laura	20 (6, 7, 7)	American Smooth	"Dance Monkey"—Tones and I	Last to be called safe

=== Week 4: Movie Week ===
Running order

Couple	Score	Dance	Music	Movie	Result
Brian & Laura	18 (6, 6, 6)	Charleston	"Fat Sam's Grand Slam" — Paul Williams	Bugsy Malone	Safe
Glenda & Robert	18 (6, 6, 6)	Contemporary Ballroom	"My Heart Will Go On" — Celine Dion	Titanic	Eliminated
Gráinne & Kai	21 (7, 7, 7)	Salsa	"(I've Had) The Time of My Life" — Bill Medley and Jennifer Warnes	Dirty Dancing	Last to be called safe
Michael & Karen	14 (4, 5, 5)	Paso doble	"Eye of the Tiger" — Survivor	Rocky III	Safe
Sinéad & Ryan	24 (8, 8, 8)	Quickstep	"Get Happy"—Renée Zellweger and Sam Smith	Judy	Safe
Lottie & Pasquale	28 (9, 9, 10)	Salsa	"Dora the Explorer theme" — John Debney and Germaine Franco	Dora and the Lost City of Gold	Safe
Mary & John	19 (5, 7, 7)	American Smooth	"He's a Tramp" — Diane & Kristen	Lady and the Tramp	Safe
Aidan & Emily	26 (8, 9, 9)	Tango	"Into the Unknown"—Panic! at the Disco	Frozen II	Safe
Fr. Ray & Kylee	9 (2, 3, 4)	Paso doble	"The Magnificent Seven theme" — Elmer Bernstein	The Magnificent Seven	Last to be called safe
Ryan & Giulia	28 (9, 10, 9)	Jive	"Saturday Night's Alright for Fighting" — Elton John	Rocketman	Safe

=== Week 5: Most Memorable Year Week ===
Running order

Couple	Score	Dance	Music	Result
Sinéad & Ryan	19 (6, 6, 7)	Cha-cha-cha	"C'est la Vie" — B*Witched	Last to be called safe
Mary & John	16 (5, 5, 6)	Waltz	"Nocturne" — Secret Garden	Safe
Brian & Laura	17 (5, 6, 6)	Cha-cha-cha	"We Are Family" — Sister Sledge	Safe
Ryan & Giulia	26 (8, 9, 9)	Rumba	"Fix You" — Coldplay	Safe
Fr. Ray & Kylee	10 (2, 4, 4)	Viennese waltz	"Hallelujah" — Fr. Ray Kelly	Safe
Lottie & Pasquale	22 (7, 7, 8)	Tango	"Radio" — Beyoncé	Last to be called safe
Gráinne & Kai	27 (9, 9, 9)	Contemporary Ballroom	"Unstoppable"—Sia	Safe
Michael & Karen	13 (4, 4, 5)	Tango	"Gold" — Spandau Ballet	Eliminated
Aidan & Emily	21 (7, 6, 8)	Charleston	"Bingo Bango" — Basement Jaxx	Safe

=== Week 6: Switch-Up Week ===
Guest act: Julian Benson with Fly Youth performing, 'Cha Cha Boom'.

Running order

Couple	Score	Dance	Music
Mary & Ryan	14 (4, 5, 5)	Jive	"Twistin' the Night Away" — Sam Cooke
Ryan & Laura	25 (8, 8, 9)	Waltz	"Open Arms" — Journey
Fr. Ray & Giulia	14 (4, 5, 5)	Charleston	"National Express" — The Divine Comedy
Sinéad & John	27 (9, 9, 9)	Viennese waltz	"Guilty" — Paloma Faith
Aidan & Kylee	18 (6, 6, 6)	Cha-cha-cha	"Feels like Home" — Sigala with Sean Paul and Fuse ODG feat. Kent Jones
Brian & Kai	23 (7, 8, 8)	Quickstep	"Out of Our Heads" — Take That
Gráinne & Pasquale	18 (6, 6, 6)	Rumba	"Beautiful People" — Ed Sheeran feat. Khalid
Lottie & Emily	26 (9, 8, 9)	Charleston	"Woman Up" — Meghan Trainor

=== Week 7: Love Week ===
Running order

Couple	Score	Dance	Music	Result
Gráinne & Kai	25 (8, 8, 9)	Quickstep	"Paper Rings"—Taylor Swift	Safe
Aidan & Emily	23 (7, 8, 8)	Contemporary Ballroom	"Someone You Loved"—Lewis Capaldi	Safe
Mary & John	16 (5, 5, 6)	Viennese waltz	"What Have I Done"—Dermot Kennedy	Safe
Brian & Laura	15 (5, 5, 5)	Tango	"When Doves Cry"—Prince	Eliminated
Ryan & Giulia	27 (9, 9, 9)	Salsa	"Perfect Strangers"—Jonas Blue feat. JP Cooper	Safe
Fr. Ray & Kylee	15 (5, 5, 5)	Jive	"Build Me Up Buttercup"—The Foundations	Last to be called safe
Sinéad & Ryan	24 (8, 8, 8)	Samba	"La Isla Bonita"—Hr. Troels	Bottom two
Lottie & Pasquale	28 (9, 9, 10)	Viennese waltz	"One of a Kind"—Ronan Keating & Emeli Sandé	Safe

Dance-Off

Judges' votes to save

- Benson: Sinéad & Ryan
- Redmond: Sinéad & Ryan
- Barry: Did not vote, but would have voted to save Sinéad & Ryan

=== Week 8: Orchestra Night ===
Individual judges scores in the charts below (given in parentheses) are listed in this order from left to right: Brian Redmond, Loraine Barry, Darren Bennett.

Due to an illness, Darren Bennett filled in for Julian Benson for the night.

All performances this week are accompanied by the RTÉ Concert Orchestra.

Running order

Couple	Score	Dance	Music	Result
Lottie & Pasquale	29 (9, 10, 10)	American Smooth	'Big Spender' — Shirley Bassey	Bottom two
Sinéad & Ryan	24 (8, 8, 8)	Tango	'Sweet Dreams (Are Made of This)' — Eurythmics	Eliminated
Fr. Ray & Kylee	14 (4, 5, 5)	Salsa	'Hot Hot Hot' — The Merrymen	Safe
Gráinne & Kai	30 (10, 10, 10)	Viennese waltz	'Waltz of the Flowers' — Pyotr Ilyich Tchaikovsky	Safe
Aidan & Emily	21 (7, 7, 7)	Paso doble	'Pompeii' — Bastille	Last to be called safe
Mary & John	19 (6, 7, 6)	Tango	'Por una Cabeza' — Carlos Gardel	Safe
Ryan & Giulia	30 (10, 10, 10)	Contemporary Ballroom	'Life on Mars' — David Bowie	Safe

Dance-Off

Judges' votes to save

- Bennett: Lottie & Pasquale
- Redmond: Lottie & Pasquale
- Barry: Did not vote, but would have voted to save Lottie & Pasquale

=== Week 9: Team Dance Week ===
Darren Bennett filled in for Julian Benson for the second week running.

Running order

Couple	Score	Dance	Music	Result
Ryan & Giulia	27 (9, 9, 9)	Quickstep	"What a Man Gotta Do" — Jonas Brothers	Safe
Mary & John	18 (6, 6, 6)	Cha-cha-cha	"Young Hearts Run Free" — Candi Staton	Eliminated
Gráinne & Kai	25 (8, 9, 8)	Paso doble	"I'd Do Anything for Love (But I Won't Do That)" — Meat Loaf	Bottom two
Fr. Ray & Kylee	13 (4, 4, 5)	Quickstep	"I'm a Believer" — The Monkees	Safe
Aidan & Emily	23 (7, 8, 8)	Rumba	"One" — U2	Safe
Lottie & Pasquale	29 (9, 10, 10)	Samba	"Tip Toe" — Jason Derulo feat. French Montana	Safe
Gráinne & Kai; Mary & John; Ryan & Giulia	24 (8, 8, 8)	Freestyle ("Rhythm Rebels")	"Physical" — Dua Lipa	
Aidan & Emily; Lottie & Pasquale; Fr. Ray & Kylee	27 (9, 9, 9)	Freestyle ("Swing Breakers")	"Sing, Sing, Sing" — Wolfgang Lohr feat. The Speakeasy Three	

Dance-Off

Judges' votes to save

- Bennett: Gráinne & Kai
- Redmond: Gráinne & Kai
- Barry: Did not vote, but would have voted to save Gráinne & Kai

=== Week 10: TV Themes Week ===
For the third week running Darren Bennett filled in for Julian Benson.

Guest act: The cast of On Your Feet! performing a Gloria Estefan medley.

Running order

Couple	Score	Dance	Music	TV Show	Result
Gráinne & Kai	22 (7, 8, 7)	Samba	"Wonder Woman theme" — Charles Fox & Norman Gimbel	Wonder Woman	Safe
Fr. Ray & Kylee	15 (5, 5, 5)	American Smooth	"Songs of Love" — The Divine Comedy	Father Ted	Eliminated
Ryan & Giulia	30 (10, 10, 10)	Charleston	"The Muppet Show theme" — Jim Henson & Sam Pottle	The Muppet Show	Safe
Lottie & Pasquale	28 (9, 9, 10)	Paso doble	"Mission Impossible theme" — Lalo Schifrin	Mission: Impossible	Bottom two
Aidan & Emily	25 (8, 8, 9)	American Smooth	"The Most Effectual Top Cat" — Hoyt Curtin	Top Cat	Safe
Lottie & Pasquale; Ryan & Giulia; Aidan & Emily; Gráinne & Kai; Fr. Ray & Kylee	5; 4; 3; 2; 1	Rock-Til-You-Drop	"Happy Days theme" — Pratt & McClain	Happy Days	

Dance-Off

Judges' votes to save

- Bennett: Lottie & Pasquale
- Redmond: Lottie & Pasquale
- Barry: Did not vote, but would have voted to save Lottie & Pasquale

=== Week 11: The Final ===
This week was scheduled to be the semifinal, however due to the COVID-19 pandemic, it was announced on the day of that it would be the final and the public would crown their winner.

The couples first performed one unlearned dance followed by a trio dance. For the trio dances each couple was joined by one eliminated pro dancer.

Darren Bennett filled in for Julian Benson for the fourth week running.

Guest act: Nathan Carter performing 'May the Road Rise'.

Running order

Couple (Trio Dance Partner)	Score	Dance	Music	Result
Aidan & Emily (with Laura Nolan)	26 (8, 9, 9)	Viennese waltz	"Another Life" — Westlife	Runner-up
Aidan & Emily (with Laura Nolan)	27 (9, 9, 9)	Salsa	"I Know You Want Me (Calle Ocho)" — Pitbull	Runner-up
Ryan & Giulia (with Karen Byrne)	29 (9, 10, 10)	Samba	"Lo-Lo Dzama" — Šum Svistu	Runner-up
Ryan & Giulia (with Karen Byrne)	30 (10, 10, 10)	American Smooth	"I Get a Kick Out of You" — Michael Bublé	Runner-up
Lottie & Pasquale (with Ryan McShane)	30 (10, 10, 10)	Quickstep	"It Don't Mean a Thing (If It Ain't Got That Swing)" — Tony Bennett & Lady Gaga	Winner
Lottie & Pasquale (with Ryan McShane)	30 (10, 10, 10)	Cha-cha-cha	"Turn Me On" — Riton X Oliver Heldens feat. Vula	Winner
Gráinne & Kai (with Stephen Vincent)	27 (9, 9, 9)	Foxtrot	"Falling" — Harry Styles	Runner-up
Gráinne & Kai (with Stephen Vincent)	30 (10, 10, 10)	Charleston	"Dance Apocalyptic"—Janelle Monáe	Runner-up

== Dance chart ==
Highest scoring dance
Lowest scoring dance
No dance performed

Couple	Week 1	Week 2	Week 3	Week 4	Week 5	Week 6	Week 7	Week 8	Week 9		Week 10		Week 11	
Lottie & Pasquale	N/A	Jive	Contemporary Ballroom	Salsa	Tango	Charleston (with Emily)	Viennese waltz	American Smooth	Samba	Freestyle (Swing Breakers)	Paso doble	Rock-Til-You-Drop	Quickstep	Cha-cha-cha (with Ryan)
Ryan & Giulia	Cha-cha-cha	N/A	Tango	Jive	Rumba	Waltz (with Laura)	Salsa	Contemporary Ballroom	Quickstep	Freestyle (Rhythm Rebels)	Charleston	Rock-Til-You-Drop	Samba	American Smooth (with Karen)
Gráinne & Kai	N/A	Tango	Jive	Salsa	Contemporary Ballroom	Rumba (with Pasquale)	Quickstep	Viennese waltz	Paso doble	Freestyle (Rhythm Rebels)	Samba	Rock-Til-You-Drop	Foxtrot	Charleston (with Stephen)
Aidan & Emily	Jive	N/A	Foxtrot	Tango	Charleston	Cha-cha-cha (with Kylee)	Contemporary Ballroom	Paso doble	Rumba	Freestyle (Swing Breakers)	American Smooth	Rock-Til-You-Drop	Viennese waltz	Salsa (with Laura)
Fr. Ray & Kylee	Foxtrot	N/A	Cha-cha-cha	Paso doble	Viennese waltz	Charleston (with Giulia)	Jive	Salsa	Quickstep	Freestyle (Swing Breakers)	American Smooth	Rock-Til-You-Drop		
Mary & John	N/A	Foxtrot	Salsa	American Smooth	Waltz	Jive (with Ryan)	Viennese waltz	Tango	Cha-cha-cha	Freestyle (Rhythm Rebels)				
Sinéad & Ryan	N/A	American Smooth	Paso doble	Quickstep	Cha-cha-cha	Viennese waltz (with John)	Samba	Tango						
Brian & Laura	Salsa	N/A	American Smooth	Charleston	Cha-cha-cha	Quickstep (with Kai)	Tango							
Michael & Karen	American Smooth	N/A	Samba	Paso doble	Tango									
Glenda & Robert	N/A	Cha-cha-cha	Waltz	Contemporary Ballroom										
Yewande & Stephen	N/A	Salsa	Viennese waltz											
