= Giulia Dotta =

Italian dancer and choreographer

- Born: 31 January 1992 (age 34); Savona, Italy
- Occupations: Dancer, Choreographer
- Known for: Dancing with the Stars (Irish series)
- Height: 1.71 m (5 ft 7 in)

Giulia Dotta (born 31 January 1992) is an Italian dancer and choreographer. She started dancing from an early age specialising in latin and ballroom dance and has had competition experience at both national and international levels. She is best known for being a professional dancer on the Irish series of Dancing with the Stars.

== Career ==
Dotta has been dancing professionally since 2012. Between 2012 and 2016, Dotta toured extensively with the Burn the Floor tour. Performing worldwide in countries including United States, China, Australia, South Africa, Japan, South Korea and the United Kingdom.

In 2015 Giulia Dotta took part in the music video for the song The girl in the yellow dress by David Gilmour from the album Rattle That Lock, lending her image and choreography to the cartoon created and directed by Danny Madden.

In 2016, she performed alongside Strictly Come Dancing professional Brendan Cole in his UK & Ireland tour.

In 2017 and 2018, she performed alongside Strictly Come Dancing professional Giovanni Pernice in his UK & Ireland tours. In 2018, Dotta also toured with Strictly Come Dancing contestants, Harry Judd, Louis Smith and Aston Merrygold's UK tour, Rip it Up.

== Dancing with the Stars ==
In 2017, Dotta was announced as one of the professional dancers for the first series of Dancing with the Stars. She was partnered with comedian, Des Bishop. Despite being one of the highest scoring couples up to that point, they were eliminated in what was described as a "shock elimination" in week six of the competition, finishing in eighth place.

In 2018, Dotta was partnered with former Ireland rugby player, Tomás O'Leary. The couple were eliminated in the fourth week of the competition, finishing in tenth place.

In 2019, Dotta was partnered with comedian, Fred Cooke. The couple reached the semifinal of the competition and were eliminated in fourth place.

In 2020, Dotta was paired with Fair City actor, Ryan Andrews. On March 15 2020, it was announced that the scheduled semi-final had become the final due to precautions around the COVID-19 pandemic halting production early. Dotta and Andrews were one of the four couples in the final. They finished as runners-up to winners, Lottie Ryan and Pasquale La Rocca.

Series	Partner	Place
1	Des Bishop	8th
2	Tomás O'Leary	10th
3	Fred Cooke	4th
4	Ryan Andrews	2nd

Highest and Lowest Scoring Per Dance

Dance	Partner	Highest	Partner	Lowest
American Smooth	Ryan Andrews	30	Fred Cooke	13
Cha-cha-cha	Des Bishop	24	Fred Cooke	12
Charleston	Ryan Andrews	30	Fr. Ray Kelly^{1}	14
Contemporary Ballroom	Ryan Andrews	30	Des Bishop	23
Foxtrot	Fred Cooke	21	Tomás O'Leary	17
Jive	Ryan Andrews	28	Denis Bastick^{1}	21
Paso Doble	Des Bishop	24	Tomás O'Leary	16
Quickstep	Ryan Andrews	27	Fred Cooke	24
Rumba	Ryan Andrews	26		
Salsa	Ryan Andrews	27	Des Bishop	21
Samba	Ryan Andrews	29	Fred Cooke	17
Showdance				
Tango	Ryan Andrews	23	Fred Cooke	17
Viennese Waltz	Fred Cooke	20		
Waltz				

^{1} These scores was awarded during Switch-Up Week.

=== Series 1 ===
Celebrity partner
Des Bishop; Average: 22; Place: 8th

Week No.	Dance/Song	Judges' score			Total	Result
Week No.	Dance/Song	Redmond	Barry	Benson	Total	Result
1	Tango / "Libertango"	5	6	7	18	No elimination
2	No dance performed	-	-	-	-	No elimination
3	Salsa / "Club Tropicana"	7	7	7	21	Safe
4	Contemporary Ballroom / "Writing's on the Wall"	7	8	8	23	Safe
5	Cha-cha-cha / "Uptown Funk"	8	8	8	24	Safe
6	Paso Doble / "When Love Comes to Town"	8	8	8	24	Eliminated

=== Series 2 ===
Celebrity partner
Tomás O'Leary; Average: 18.3; Place: 10th

Week No.	Dance/Song	Judges' score			Total	Result
Week No.	Dance/Song	Redmond	Barry	Benson	Total	Result
1	Foxtrot / "All of Me"	5	6	6	17	No elimination
2	No dance performed	-	-	-	-	No elimination
3	Jive / "Chasing Cars"	7	7	8	22	Safe
4	Paso Doble / "Immigrant Song"	5	5	6	16	Eliminated

=== Series 3 ===
Celebrity partner
Fred Cooke; Average: 19.6; Place: 4th

Week No.	Dance/Song	Judges' score			Total	Result
Week No.	Dance/Song	Redmond	Barry	Benson	Total	Result
1	Cha-cha-cha / "Sexy and I Know It"	3	4	5	12	No elimination
2	No dance performed	-	-	-	-	No elimination
3	Charleston / "Right Said Fred"	7	8	8	23	Safe
4	American Smooth / "The Pink Panther Theme"	4	4	5	13	Safe
5	Tango / "Beat It"	5	6	6	17	Safe
6	Jive / "Great Balls of Fire"	7	7	7	21	No elimination Switch-Up Week with Denis Bastick
7	Quickstep / "Dancin' Fool"	8	8	8	24	Bottom two
8	Jive / "I'm Still Standing"	8	8	8	24	Safe
9	Viennese Waltz / "With a Little Help from My Friends"; Team Dance / "Born This Way"	6; 8	7; 9	7; 9	20; 26	Safe
10	Samba / "We've Got the World"; Euro-thon / "Making Your Mind Up"	5 Awarded	6; 2	6 points	17; 19	Bottom two
11	Foxtrot / "Brown Eyed Girl"; Salsa / "Best Years of Our Lives"	7; 8	7; 8	7; 8	21; 24	Eliminated

=== Series 4 ===
Celebrity partner
Ryan Andrews; Average: 26.7; Place: 2nd

Week No.	Dance/Song	Judges' score			Total	Result
Week No.	Dance/Song	Redmond	Barry	Benson	Total	Result
1	Cha-cha-cha / "If I Can't Have You"	6	7	8	21	No elimination
2	No dance performed	-	-	-	-	No elimination
3	Tango / "Bad Guy"	7	8	8	23	Safe
4	Jive / "Saturday Night's Alright for Fighting"	9	10	9	28	Safe
5	Rumba / "Fix You"	8	9	9	26	Safe
6	Charleston / "National Express"	4	5	5	14	No elimination Switch-Up Week with Fr. Ray Kelly
7	Salsa / "Perfect Strangers"	9	9	9	27	Safe
8	Contemporary Ballroom / "Life on Mars"	10	10	10	30	Safe
9	Quickstep / "What a Man Gotta Do"; Team Dance / "Physical"	9; 8	9; 8	9; 8	27; 24	Safe
10	Charleston / "The Muppet Show theme" Rock-Til-You-Drop / "Happy Days"	10; Awarded	10; 4	10 points	30; 34	Safe
11	Samba / "Lo-Lo Dzama"; American Smooth (with Karen Byrne) / "I Get a Kick Out of You"	9; 10	10; 10	10; 10	29; 30	Runners-up

== Personal life ==
From 2016 to 2021, Dotta was in a relationship with professional dancer and fellow Dancing with the Stars dancer, Kai Widdrington.
