= Ryan McShane =

Northern Irish dancer and choreographer (born 1985)

- Born: 22 January 1985 (age 40); Lurgan, Armagh, Northern Ireland
- Occupation(s): Dancer, choreographer
- Known for: Dancing with the Stars (Irish series); Britain's Got Talent
- Partner: Sylwia Matuszewska

Ryan McShane (born 22 January 1985) is a Northern Irish dancer and choreographer. He, alongside his professional partner, Ksenia Zsikhotska, were the 2016 United Kingdom & British Latin Professional Champions and British Show Dance Champions. He is also known as being one of the professional dancers on the Irish version of Dancing with the Stars.

== Early life ==
McShane was born in Lurgan, Northern Ireland. He started dancing at the age of seven.

== Career ==
In 2015, McShane toured with Strictly Come Dancing professional Brendan Cole's A Night to Remember tour across the UK and Ireland.

In 2016, McShane and partner, Ksenia Zsikhotska, were crowned United Kingdom & British Latin Professional Champions & British Show Dance Champions.

=== Got to Dance ===
In 2013, McShane took part in the Sky One dance competition show, Got to Dance alongside partner, Ksenia Zsikhotska. They received three gold stars from the judges and advanced to the next round before being eliminated.

=== Britain's Got Talent ===
In 2014, McShane helped establish the ballroom dance group, Kings & Queens, alongside future Strictly Come Dancing professionals, Katya Jones and Neil Jones as well as his future Dancing with the Stars fellow-professionals, Ksenia Zsikhotska and Kai Widdrington. Kings & Queens reached the semi-finals of the series before being eliminated.

=== Dancing with the Stars ===
In 2017, McShane was announced as one of the professional dancers for the first series of Dancing with the Stars. He was partnered with actress, Denise McCormack. On 26 March 2017, McCormack and McShane reached the final of the competition, eventually finishing as joint runners-up alongside Aoibhín Garrihy and Vitali Kozmin. Aidan O'Mahony and Valeria Milova were the champions of the series.

In 2018, McShane was partnered with fitness model, and UFC fighter, Conor McGregor's sister, Erin McGregor. The couple survived three dance-offs, the most for any couple in the history of the series, before being eliminated in the semifinal in a dance-off against eventual series winners, Jake Carter and Karen Byrne.

In 2019, McShane was partnered with Mrs. Brown's Boys star Eilish O'Carroll. They were the first couple to be eliminated from the series.

In 2020, McShane was partnered with B*Witched singer Sinéad O'Carroll. They reached the eighth week of the competition before being eliminated in a dance-off against eventual winners, Lottie Ryan and Pasquale La Rocca.

| Series | Partner | Place |
|---|---|---|
| 1 | Denise McCormack | 2nd |
| 2 | Erin McGregor | 4th |
| 3 | Eilish O'Carroll | 11th |
| 4 | Sinéad O'Carroll | 7th |

Highest and Lowest Scoring Per Dance

| Dance | Partner | Highest | Partner | Lowest |
|---|---|---|---|---|
| American Smooth | Denise McCormack | 25 | Sinéad O'Carroll | 21 |
| Cha-cha-cha | Denise McCormack | 27 | Sinéad O'Carroll | 19 |
| Charleston | Denise McCormack | 30 | Erin McGregor | 22 |
| Contemporary Ballroom | Denise McCormack | 28 | Erin McGregor | 25 |
| Foxtrot | Erin McGregor | 24 | | |
| Jive | Denise McCormack | 22 | Mary Kennedy^{1} | 14 |
| Paso Doble | Erin McGregor | 28 | Sinéad O'Carroll | 24 |
| Quickstep | Sinéad O'Carroll | 24 | Denise McCormack | 22 |
| Rumba | Denise McCormack | 26 | | |
| Salsa | Denise McCormack | 30 | Erin McGregor | 23 |
| Samba | Denise McCormack; Erin McGregor | 27 | Eilish O'Carroll | 12 |
| Showdance | Denise McCormack | 30 | | |
| Tango | Denise McCormack | 30 | Eilish O'Carroll | 15 |
| Viennese Waltz | Erin McGregor; Anna Geary^{1} | 22 | | |
| Waltz | Erin McGregor | 29 | | |

^{1} These scores was awarded during Switch-Up Week.

==== Series 1 ====
Celebrity partner
Denise McCormack; Average: 26.9; Place: 2nd

| Week No. | Dance/Song | Judges' score | | | Total | Result |
|---|---|---|---|---|---|---|
| Week No. | Dance/Song | Redmond | Barry | Benson | Total | Result |
| 1 | No dance performed | – | – | – | – | No elimination |
| 2 | Jive / "Shake It Off" | 7 | 7 | 8 | 22 | No elimination |
| 3 | Tango / "Roxanne" | 8 | 9 | 9 | 26 | Safe |
| 4 | Rumba / "I See Fire" | 8 | 9 | 9 | 26 | Safe |
| 5 | Samba / "Cheap Thrills" | 9 | 9 | 9 | 27 | Safe |
| 6 | American Smooth / "Anything Goes" | 8 | 9 | 8 | 25 | Safe |
| 7 | Jive / "Tutti Frutti" | 6 | 6 | 6 | 18 | No elimination Switch-Up Week with Teresa Mannion |
| 8 | Salsa / "Vivir Mi Vida" | 9 | 9 | 9 | 27 | Bottom two |
| 9 | Quickstep / "Valerie" | 7 | 7 | 8 | 22 | Safe |
| 10 | Charleston / "A Little Party Never Killed Nobody (All We Got)"; The Ballroom Blitz / "The Ballroom Blitz" | 10; Extra | 10; 3 | 10; Points | 30; 33 | Safe |
| 11 | Contemporary Ballroom / "Take Me to Church"; Cha-cha-cha / "Fiebre" | 9; 9 | 10; 9 | 9; 9 | 28; 27 | Bottom two |
| 12 | Tango / "Roxanne"; Salsa / "Vivir Mi Vida"; Showdance / "Imagine" | 10; 10; 10 | 10; 10; 10 | 10; 10; 10 | 30; 30; 30 | Runners-up |

==== Series 2 ====
Celebrity partner
Erin McGregor; Average: 24.7; Place: 4th

| Week No. | Dance/Song | Judges' score | | | Total | Result |
|---|---|---|---|---|---|---|
| Week No. | Dance/Song | Redmond | Barry | Benson | Total | Result |
| 1 | No dance performed | – | – | – | – | No elimination |
| 2 | Salsa / "Instruction" | 7 | 8 | 8 | 23 | No elimination |
| 3 | Viennese Waltz / "You Don't Own Me" | 7 | 7 | 8 | 22 | Safe |
| 4 | Charleston / "Woo-Hoo" | 7 | 7 | 8 | 22 | Safe |
| 5 | Foxtrot / "Feels Like Home" | 8 | 8 | 8 | 24 | Safe |
| 6 | Viennese Waltz / "Say You Love Me" | 7 | 7 | 8 | 22 | No elimination Switch-Up Week with Anna Geary |
| 7 | Paso Doble / "Seven Nation Army" | 9 | 9 | 10 | 28 | Bottom two |
| 8 | Cha-cha-cha / "It's Raining Men" | 8 | 8 | 9 | 25 | Safe |
| 9 | Waltz / "Kissing You"; Team Dance / "Party Rock Anthem" | 9; 8 | 10; 8 | 10; 9 | 29; 25 | Bottom two |
| 10 | Tango / "Cell Block Tango"; Swing-a-thon / "You Can't Stop the Beat" | 9 Extra | 9; 3 | 9 Points | 27; 30 | Bottom two |
| 11 | Samba / "Rain"; Contemporary Ballroom / "Alive" | 9; 8 | 9; 8 | 9; 9 | 27; 25 | Eliminated |

==== Series 3 ====
Celebrity partner
Eilish O'Carroll; Average: 13.5; Place: 11th

| Week No. | Dance/Song | Judges' score | | | Total | Result |
|---|---|---|---|---|---|---|
| Week No. | Dance/Song | Redmond | Barry | Benson | Total | Result |
| 1 | No dance performed | – | – | – | – | No elimination |
| 2 | Tango / "I Can't Tell a Waltz from a Tango" | 5 | 5 | 5 | 15 | No elimination |
| 3 | Samba / "Eso Beso" | 3 | 4 | 5 | 12 | Eliminated |

==== Series 4 ====
Celebrity partner
Sinéad O'Carroll; Average: 23.3; Place: 7th

| Week No. | Dance/Song | Judges' score | | | Total | Result |
|---|---|---|---|---|---|---|
| Week No. | Dance/Song | Redmond | Barry | Benson | Total | Result |
| 1 | No dance performed | – | – | – | – | No elimination |
| 2 | American Smooth / "Bewitched" | 7 | 7 | 7 | 21 | No elimination |
| 3 | Paso Doble / "El gato montés" | 8 | 8 | 8 | 24 | Safe |
| 4 | Quickstep / "Get Happy" | 8 | 8 | 8 | 24 | Safe |
| 5 | Cha-Cha-Cha / "C'est La Vie" | 6 | 6 | 7 | 19 | Safe |
| 6 | Jive / "Twistin' the Night Away" | 4 | 5 | 5 | 14 | No elimination Switch-Up Week with Mary Kennedy |
| 7 | Samba / "La Isla Bonita" | 8 | 8 | 8 | 24 | Bottom two |
| 8 | Tango / "Sweet Dreams (Are Made of This)" | 8 | 8 | 8 | 24 | Eliminated |

== Personal life ==
McShane and professional partner, Ksenia Zsikhotska were in a relationship previously.

Since 2017, McShane has been dating model, Thalia Heffernan. Despite not dancing together, McShane met Heffernan while she was a contestant on the first series of the show. They have two dogs together.

On 30 December 2019, five days before the launch of the fourth season of Dancing with the Stars, McShane was assaulted outside a nightclub in his hometown of Lurgan. He received facial injuries, resulting in him needing stitches.
