= Ballando con le Stelle series 18 =

Ballando con le Stelle
- Season 18
- Celebrity winner: Wanda Nara
- Professional winner: Pasquale La Rocca

Release
- Original network: RAI 1
- Original release: 21 October 2023 – 6 January 2024

Series chronology
- ← Previous; Series 17 Next → Series 19

The eighteenth series of Ballando con le Stelle was broadcast from 21 October 2023 to 6 January 2024 on RAI 1 and was presented by Milly Carlucci with Paolo Belli and his Big Band.

== Couples ==
Celebrity	Age	Occupation	Professional partner	Status
Lino Banfi	87	Actor & comedian	Alessandra Tripoli	Withdrew; 11 November 2023
Ricky Tognazzi	68	Actor, producer & film director	Tove Villför	Eliminated 1st 11 November 2023
Paola Perego	57	Television presenter	Angelo Madonia	Eliminated 3rd 25 November 2023
Antonio Caprarica	72	Journalist	Maria Ermachkova	Withdrew; 2 December 2023
Carlotta Mantovan	40	Television presenter & journalist	Moreno Porcu	Eliminated 4th 2 December 2023
Giovanni Terzi	59	Journalist & partner of Simona Ventura	Giada Lini	Fourth place 23 December 2023
Rosanna Lambertucci	77	Television presenter & author	Simone Casula	Eliminated 2nd 18 November 2023; Voted back 16 December 2023; Fourth place 23 December 2023
Sara Croce	25	Model & social media personality	Luca Favilla	Fourth place 23 December 2023
Lorenzo Tano	27	Model & son of Rocco Siffredi	Lucrezia Lando	Third place 23 December 2023
Teo Mammucari	59	Television presenter & comedian	Anastasia Kuzmina	Third place 23 December 2023
Simona Ventura	58	Television presenter	Samuel Peron	Second place 23 December 2023
Wanda Nara	36	Showgirl & football agent	Pasquale La Rocca	Winners; 23 December 2023

== Scoring chart ==
Couple	Place	1	2	3	4	5	6	7	8	9		10
Wanda & Pasquale	1	43	50	46 + 10 = 56	45	49	50 + 8 = 58	46 + 7 + 30 = 83	45 + 8 = 53	60 + 25 = 85		50
Simona & Samuel	2	43	45	31 + 10 = 41	45	46 + 44 = 90	50 + 8 = 58	42 + 8 = 50	47 + 6 + 30 = 83	51 + 25 = 76		43
Teo & Anastasia	3	33	31 + 25 = 56	35 + 10 = 45	27	31	30 + 6 = 36	38 + 8 = 46	33 + 6 + 30 = 69	54		43
Lorenzo & Lucrezia	3	18	34	24	33	37	40 + 5 = 45	42 + 6 = 48	41 + 6 = 47	45		43
Sara & Luca	4	32	17	32 + 25 = 57	37	40	41 + 5 = 46	31 + 6 = 37	37 + 7 = 44	50		38
Rosanna & Simone	4	18	24 - 10 = 14	18	15 - 10 + 30 = 35	28				68	36%	33 - 20 = 13
Giovanni & Giada	4	24	26	28	28 - 10 = 18	31	26 + 4 = 30	30 + 6 + 30 = 66	27 + 5 = 32	18		29
Carlotta & Moreno	8	40	18	44	38	35	34 + 7 + 49 = 90	26 + 5 = 31		36		
Antonio & Maria	9	17	31 - 10 + 25 = 46	38	41	40	43 + 5 + 49 = 97	31 + 5 = 36				
Paola & Angelo	10	30	29	31	33 + 30 = 63	25 + 45 = 70	35 + 6 = 41					
Ricky & Tove	11	34 + 25 = 59	32	21 + 25 = 46	16					36		
Lino & Alessandra	12	50 + 25 = 75	35	33	—							

Red numbers indicate the lowest score for each week.
Green numbers indicate the highest score for each week.
indicates the couple eliminated that week.
indicates the returning couples that finished in the bottom two/three was saved by a second public vote.
indicates the returning couples that finished in the top position and received a bonus for the next week.
indicates the returning couples that finished in the bottom position and received a malus for the next week.
indicates the returning couple that received a bonus.
indicates the couple who quit the competition.
indicates the couple who was ejected from the competition.
indicates the couple was voted back into the competition.
indicates the couple was eliminated but was voted back into the competition by "safe-conduct".
indicates the couple was voted back into the competition but then re-eliminated.
indicates the winning couple.
indicates the runner-up couple.
indicates the third-place couple.
