= Kai Widdrington =

English dancer and choreographer

- Born: 23 August 1995 (age 31); Southampton, England
- Occupations: Dancer; Choreographer
- Known for: Dancing with the Stars (Irish TV series); Britain's Got Talent; Strictly Come Dancing
- Height: 6 ft 2 in (1.88 m)
- Parent: Tommy Widdrington
- Relatives: Theo Widdrington (brother)

Kai Widdrington (born 23 August 1995) is an English dancer and choreographer. In 2010, he was the Junior World Latin American champion. In 2012, he reached the final of the sixth series of Britain's Got Talent. Between 2017 and 2020, he was a professional dancer on the Irish version of Dancing with the Stars, and in 2021, he became a professional dancer on the BBC show Strictly Come Dancing.

== Early life ==
Widdrington was born in Southampton, England to former Premier League footballer Tommy Widdrington and mother Candice. His younger brother Theo is a footballer. Widdrington was also set to follow in his father's footsteps by becoming a professional footballer, but aged 12 chose a dancing career instead of a Premier League contract. By the time he was 14, he was the World Junior Latin American champion. Widdrington also has a younger sister.

Widdrington is of part Chinese descent. His maternal grandfather is half Chinese and said to have been at school in the same class as actor Bruce Lee.

== Career ==
=== Britain's Got Talent ===
In 2012, Widdrington formed a dance partnership with Natalia Jeved, both of whom auditioned for the sixth series of Britain's Got Talent. The pair managed to reach the live final coming 11th and last place. Two years later, in 2014, Widdrington made a second appearance on the programme during its eighth series, as part of the ballroom dance group Kings & Queens, working alongside future Strictly Come Dancing professionals Katya Jones and Neil Jones, and future Dancing with the Stars professionals Ksenia Zsikhotska and Ryan McShane. The group managed to reach the semi-finals of the series, but were ultimately eliminated from the competition by that stage.

=== Dancing with the Stars ===
In 2017, Widdrington was announced as one of the professional dancers for the first series of Dancing with the Stars in Ireland. He was partnered with comedian and actress Katherine Lynch. They were eliminated in week nine of the competition, finishing in sixth place.

In 2018, Widdrington was partnered with camogie player Anna Geary. They reached the final of the show, finishing as joint-runners up alongside Deirdre O'Kane and John Nolan.

In 2019, Widdrington was partnered with teenage actress Demi Isaac Oviawe. They were eliminated in week seven of the competition, finishing in eighth place.

In 2020, Widdrington was paired with Miss Universe Ireland 2018, Gráinne Gallanagh. On 15 March 2020, it was announced that the scheduled semi-final had become the final due to precautions around the COVID-19 pandemic halting production early. Gallanagh and Widdrington were one of the four couples in the final, and they finished as runners-up to winners Lottie Ryan and Pasquale La Rocca.

Series	Partner	Place
1	Katherine Lynch	6th
2	Anna Geary	2nd
3	Demi Isaac Oviawe	8th
4	Gráinne Gallanagh	2nd

Highest and Lowest Scoring Per Dance

Dance	Partner	Highest	Partner	Lowest
American Smooth	Anna Geary	22		
Cha-cha-cha	Katherine Lynch	18	Demi Isaac Oviawe	10
Charleston	Anna Geary; Gráinne Gallanagh	30	Katherine Lynch	23
Contemporary Ballroom	Anna Geary; Gráinne Gallanagh	27		
Foxtrot	Katherine Lynch	28	Demi Isaac Oviawe	14
Jive	Anna Geary	29	Katherine Lynch	19
Paso Doble	Gráinne Gallanagh	25	Anna Geary	22
Quickstep	Gráinne Gallanagh	25	Katherine Lynch	21
Rumba	Anna Geary	24	Demi Isaac Oviawe	16
Salsa	Anna Geary	30	Demi Isaac Oviawe	20
Samba	Gráinne Gallanagh	22	Katherine Lynch	16
Showdance	Anna Geary	30		
Tango	Anna Geary	28	Gráinne Gallanagh	18
Viennese Waltz	Gráinne Gallanagh	30	Demi Isaac Oviawe	21
Waltz	Katherine Lynch	18		

^{1} This score was awarded during Switch-Up Week.

==== Series 1 ====
Celebrity partner: Katherine Lynch

Week	Dance	Music	Judges' Scores			Total Score	Result
Week	Dance	Music	Redmond	Barry	Benson (Note: Darren Bennett filled in for Julian Benson during Weeks 5-7.)	Total Score	Result
2	Waltz	"If You Go Away"	6	6	6	18	No Elimination
3	Cha-cha-cha	"Express Yourself"	6	6	6	18	Safe
4	Samba	"Voulez-Vous"	5	5	6	16	Safe
5	Foxtrot	"Summertime"	7	8	7	22	Safe
6	Quickstep	"You're the One That I Want"	7	7	7	21	Safe
7 (Note: Kai danced with Aoibhín Garrihy for this week only as it was Switch-Up Week.)	Foxtrot	"Big Bad Handsome Man"	9	10	9	28	No Elimination
8	Charleston	"Cabaret"	7	8	8	23	Safe
9	Jive	"Proud Mary"	6	6	7	19	Eliminated

==== Series 2 ====
Celebrity partner: Anna Geary

Week	Dance	Music	Judges' Scores			Total Score	Result
Week	Dance	Music	Redmond	Barry	Benson (Note: Darren Bennett filled in for Julian Benson during Week 2.)	Total Score	Result
2	Tango	"Rebel Rebel"	6	8	7	21	No Elimination
3	Samba	"New Rules"	6	6	6	18	Safe
4	Contemporary Ballroom	"Let It Go"	9	9	9	27	Safe
5	Paso Doble	"Titanium"	7	7	8	22	Safe
6 (Note: Kai danced with Alannah Beirne for this week only as it was Switch-Up Week.)	Tango	"Green Light"	9	9	9	27	No Elimination
7	Charleston	"Bang Bang"	10	10	10	30	Safe
8	American Smooth	"Achy Breaky Heart"	7	7	8	22	Safe
9	Rumba; Team Dance	"Secret Love Song" "Party Rock Anthem"	8; 8	8; 8	8; 9	24; 25	Safe
10	Jive; Swing-a-thon	"Time Warp" "You Can't Stop the Beat"	9	10	10	33 (Note: Anna & Kai were awarded 4 extra points for coming second place in the Swing-a-thon.)	Safe
11	Foxtrot; Salsa	"Dancing in the Moonlight (It's Caught Me in Its Spotlight)" "Don't Stop the Music"	8; 10	8; 10	8; 10	24; 30	Safe
12	Tango; Charleston; Showdance	"Rebel Rebel" "Bang Bang" "This Is Me"	9; 10; 10	10; 10; 10	9; 10; 10	28; 30; 30	Runners-up

==== Series 3 ====
Celebrity partner: Demi Isaac Oviawe

Week	Dance	Music	Judges' Scores (Note: Individual judges' scores are listed in the following order: Brian Redmond, Loraine Barry, Julian Benson.)			Total Score	Result
Week	Dance	Music	Redmond	Barry	Benson (Note: Darren Bennett filled in for Julian Benson during Week 7.)	Total Score	Result
2	Cha-cha-cha	"Cut to the Feeling"	3	3	4	10	No Elimination
3	Foxtrot	"After All"	4	5	5	14	Safe
4	Salsa	"One Night Only"	6	6	8	20	Safe
5	Rumba	"Dance with My Father"	5	5	6	16	Safe
6 (Note: Kai danced with Mairéad Ronan for this week only as it was Switch-Up Week.)	Salsa	"Dance Again"	8	8	9	26	No Elimination
7	Viennese Waltz	"Fallin'"	7	7	7	21	Eliminated

==== Series 4 ====
Celebrity partner: Gráinne Gallanagh

Week	Dance	Music	Judges' Scores			Total Score	Result
Week	Dance	Music	Redmond	Barry	Benson (Note: Darren Bennett filled in for Julian Benson during Weeks 8-11)	Total Score	Result
2	Tango	"Bang Bang"	6	6	6	18	No Elimination
3	Jive	"Dear Future Husband"	6	7	7	20	Safe
4	Salsa	"(I've Had) The Time of My Life"	7	7	7	21	Safe
5	Contemporary Ballroom	"Unstoppable"	9	9	9	27	Safe
6 (Note: Kai danced with Brian Dowling for this week only as it was Switch-Up Week.)	Quickstep	"Out of Our Heads"	7	8	8	23	No Elimination
7	Quickstep	"Paper Rings"	8	8	9	25	Safe
8	Viennese Waltz	"Waltz of the Flowers"	10	10	10 (Note: Darren Bennett filled in for Julian Benson during Week 8.)	30	Safe
9	Paso Doble; Team Dance	"I'd Do Anything for Love (But I Won't Do That)" "Physical"	8; 8	9; 8	8; 8 (Note: Darren Bennett also filled in for Julian Benson during Week 9.)	25; 24	Bottom Two
10	Samba; Rock-Til-You-Drop	"Wonder Woman Theme" "Happy Days"	7	8	7 (Note: Darren Bennett once again filled in for Julian Benson during Week 10.)	24 (Note: Gráinne & Kai were awarded 2 extra points for coming fourth place in the Rock-Til-You-Drop.)	Safe
11	Foxtrot; Charleston (Note: Gráinne & Kai danced their Charleston with Stephen Vincent.)	"Falling" "Dance Apocalyptic"	9; 10	9; 10	9; 10 (Note: Darren Bennett, for the fourth week running, filled in for Julian Benson during Week 11.)	27; 30	Runners-up

=== Strictly Come Dancing ===
From September 2021, he appeared as a professional dancer on the nineteenth series of Strictly Come Dancing, partnered with television presenter AJ Odudu. In their first week the couple topped the leaderboard with a score of 34 for their jive to Gold Dust by DJ Fresh. Judge Motsi Mabuse hailed the routine "the best dance of the evening, without a doubt." The couple qualified for the final but had to withdraw the day before after Odudu suffered an ankle injury.

For the twentieth series, Widdrington was partnered with Loose Women panellist, Kaye Adams. They were the first couple to be eliminated from the series after losing the first dance off to Matt Goss and Nadiya Bychkova. On 30 November 2022, it was announced he would dance with Alexandra Mardell for the 2022 Strictly Christmas Special; they eventually won the competition with a perfect score on their quickstep.

For the twenty-first series, Widdrington was partnered with television presenter and journalist, Angela Rippon. They finished 7th, being eliminated in week 9 after losing the dance off to Bobby Brazier and Dianne Buswell.

In 2024 Widdrington returned for the twenty-second series but was not paired with a celebrity partner. He went on to win the Christmas Special dancing a Cha-cha-cha with Welsh drag queen Tayce, in December 2024, with Tayce becoming the first drag queen to compete on Strictly Come Dancing. The pair scored maximum points from all four judges.

For the twenty-third series, Widdrington was partnered with television personality Vicky Pattison. They finished in 8th place, being eliminated in week 8 after losing the dance off to Balvinder Sopal and Julian Caillon. On 24 November 2025, it was announced he would dance with Melanie Blatt for the 2025 Strictly Christmas Special; they danced Theatre/Jazz and received a score of 36.

For the twenty-fourth series, Widdrington was partnered with singer-songwriter Delta Goodrem.

Series	Partner	Place	Average score
19	AJ Odudu	3rd	34.6
20	Kaye Adams	15th	21.5
21	Angela Rippon	7th	30.1
23	Vicky Pattison	8th	28.8
24	Delta Goodrem	TBD	30.7

Highest and Lowest Scoring Per Dance

Dance	Partner	Highest	Partner	Lowest
American Smooth	AJ Odudu	35	Angela Rippon	28
Argentine Tango	AJ Odudu	35	Angela Rippon	34
Cha-cha-cha	Delta Goodrem	31	Vicky Pattison	23
Charleston	AJ Odudu	39	Kaye Adams	22
Couple's Choice	AJ Odudu	36	Vicky Pattison	33
Foxtrot	AJ Odudu; Angela Rippon	31	Vicky Pattison	24
Jive	AJ Odudu	34	Vicky Pattison	27
Paso Doble	Angela Rippon	32	AJ Odudu	28
Quickstep	AJ Odudu	40	Angela Rippon	26
Rumba	AJ Odudu	39	Angela Rippon	31
Salsa	Delta Goodrem	33	AJ Odudu	30
Samba	Vicky Pattison; Delta Goodrem	29	AJ Odudu	28
Showdance				
Tango	Vicky Pattison	39	Kaye Adams	21
Viennese Waltz	AJ Odudu	40	Delta Goodrem	33
Waltz	AJ Odudu	38	Angela Rippon	28

==== Series 19 ====
Celebrity partner: AJ Odudu

Week	Dance	Music	Judges' Scores				Total Score	Result
Week	Dance	Music	Horwood (Note: Cynthia Erivo filled in for Craig Revel Horwood during Week 9.)	Mabuse (Note: Cynthia Erivo also filled in for Motsi Mabuse during Week 10.)	Ballas	Du Beke	Total Score	Result
1	Jive	"Gold Dust"	8	8	9	9	34	No Elimination
2	Foxtrot	"Tears Dry on Their Own"	7	9	7	8	31	Safe
3	American Smooth	"I Have Nothing"	8	9	9	9	35	Safe
4	Samba	"Don't Go Yet"	5	7	8	8	28	Safe
5	Argentine tango	"Edge of Seventeen"	8	8	10	9	35	Safe
6	Viennese waltz	"Dangerous Woman"	9	10	9	9	37	Safe
7	Charleston	"Don't Bring Lulu"	9	10	10	10	39	Safe
8	Paso doble	"Game of Survival"	6	7	7	8	28	Safe
9	Waltz	"Edelweis"	9	10	10	9	38	Safe
10	Couple's Choice	"Make Me Feel"	9	8	10	9	36	Safe
11	Salsa	"Rhythm Is Gonna Get You" / "Get on Your Feet"	7	8	8	7	30	Bottom two
12	Quickstep; Rumba	"Sing Sing Sing" "Show Me Heaven"	10; 9	10; 10	10; 10	10; 10	40; 39	Withdrew

==== Series 20 ====
Celebrity partner: Kaye Adams

Week	Dance	Music	Judges' scores				Total score	Result
Week	Dance	Music	Horwood	Mabuse	Ballas	Du Beke	Total score	Result
1	Tango	"Voulez-Vous"	6	5	5	5	21	No Elimination
2	Charleston	"Music! Music! Music!"	4	6	6	6	22	Eliminated

==== Series 21 ====
Celebrity partner: Angela Rippon

Week	Dance	Music	Judges' Scores				Total Score	Result
Week	Dance	Music	Horwood	Mabuse	Ballas	Du Beke	Total Score	Result
1	Cha-cha-cha	"Get the Party Started"	7	7	7	7	28	No Elimination
2	Foxtrot	"You Make Me Feel So Young"	8	8	7	8	31	Safe
3	Quickstep	"Do-Re-Mi"	6	7	6	7	26	Safe
4	Rumba	"Rise Like a Phoenix"	8	7	8	8	31	Safe
5	Argentine tango	"Tanguera"	8	9	8	9	34	Safe
6	Charleston	"Theme from Murder, She Wrote"	9	8	8	8	33	Safe
7	Waltz	"Fascination"	7	8	6	7	28	Bottom Two
8	Paso doble	"Hung Up"	8	8	8	8	32	Bottom Two
9	American Smooth	"Tea for Two"	6	7	7	8	28	Eliminated

==== Series 23 ====
Celebrity partner: Vicky Pattison

Week	Dance	Music	Judges' Scores				Total Score	Result
Week	Dance	Music	Horwood	Mabuse	Ballas	Du Beke	Total Score	Result
1	Cha-cha-cha	"Best of My Love"	5	6	6	6	23	No Elimination
2	Foxtrot	"Rein Me In"	6	6	6	6	24	Safe
3	Charleston	"A Little Party Never Killed Nobody (All We Got)"	5	7	6	7	25	Safe
4	Samba	"La Isla Bonita"	7	7	7	8	29	Safe
5	Couple's choice	"Fight for This Love"	8	8	8	9	33	Safe
6	American Smooth	"Total Eclipse of the Heart"	7	8	8	8	31	Safe
7	Tango	"The Fate of Ophelia"	9	10	10	10	39	Safe
8	Jive	"Sound of the Underground"	6	7	7	7	27	Eliminated

==== Series 24 ====
Celebrity partner: Delta Goodrem

Week	Dance	Music	Judges' Scores				Total Score	Result
Week	Dance	Music	Horwood	Mabuse	Ballas	Du Beke	Total Score	Result
1	Samba	"Baianá"	7	8	7	7	29	No; Elimination
2	American; Smooth	"I'll Never Love Again"	8	7	7	8	30	Safe
3	Salsa	"Always There" / Ain't Nobody"	8	9	8	8	33	Safe
4	Bye Week (Note: Due to injury, Delta was unable to dance and was granted a bye through to the next week.)							
5	Rumba	"It's All Coming Back to Me Now"	7	9	8	10	34	Safe
6	Viennese waltz	"Unchained Melody"	8	8	9	9	33	Safe
7	Cha-cha-cha	"Let's Get Loud"	7	8	7	9	31	Safe
8 (Note: Due to illness, Kai was unable to dance. This week, Delta danced with Aljaž Škorjanec.)	Argentine tango	"Missing"	9	9	8	9	35	Safe
9								

==== Christmas Specials ====
Year	Celebrity partner	Dance	Music	Judges' scores (Note: Individual judges' scores are listed in the following order: Craig Revel Horwood, Motsi Mabuse, Shirley Ballas, Anton Du Beke.)				Total score	Result
2022	Alexandra Mardell	Quickstep	"Sleigh Ride"	10	10	10	10	40	Winners
2024	Tayce	Cha-cha-cha	"100 Degrees"	10	10	10	10	40	Winners
2025	Melanie Blatt	Theatre/Jazz	"Santa Baby"	8	9	10	9	36	Participant

== Personal life ==
From 2016 to 2021, Widdrington was in a relationship with professional dancer and fellow Dancing with the Stars professional, Giulia Dotta. In June 2022, it was reported that he was in a relationship with fellow Strictly professional dancer, Nadiya Bychkova, but they were reported to have ended their relationship in July 2024.

== Dance tours ==
In September 2026, Widdrington & Lauren Oakley announced they were to appear at "Dancing With The Stars Weekends" 2027.
