= Dancing with the Stars (Irish TV series) series 1 =

Dancing with the Stars
- Series 1
- Presented by: Amanda Byram; Nicky Byrne
- Judges: Julian Benson; Loraine Barry; Brian Redmond; Darren Bennett (guest)
- Celebrity winner: Aidan O'Mahony
- Professional winner: Valeria Milova
- No. of episodes: 12

Release
- Original network: RTÉ One
- Original release: 8 January – 26 March 2017

Series chronology
- Next → Series 2

Dancing with the Stars is an Irish reality television series, airing on RTÉ One that started on 8 January 2017, hosted by Amanda Byram and Nicky Byrne. The show is based on the original UK version, and is part of the Dancing with the Stars franchise. The judging panel consists of Julian Benson, Loraine Barry and Brian Redmond.

== Couples ==
In November 2016, it was reported that former Big Brother contestant, Hughie Maughan, would be participating in the competition. On 20 November 2016, it was reported that former RTÉ News reader, Teresa Mannion will be taking part in the series.

Des Bishop was confirmed as the first celebrity on 9 December 2016, during an appearance on The Late Late Show; RTÉ later confirmed he would be taking part in the series on Twitter. On 11 December 2016, former Fair City actress Aoibhín Garrihy, Red Rock actress Denise McCormack and model Thalia Heffernan were confirmed to take part in the series. On 12 December 2016, RTÉ confirmed the remaining seven contestants. Later that week, the professional dancing line-up was confirmed.

Celebrity	Known for	Professional	Status
Hughie Maughan	Big Brother UK runner-up	Emily Barker	Eliminated 1st on 22 January 2017
Thalia Heffernan	Model	Curtis Pritchard	Eliminated 2nd on 29 January 2017
Dr. Eva Orsmond	Television personality	Sean Smullen	Eliminated 3rd on 5 February 2017
Des Bishop	Stand-up comedian	Giulia Dotta	Eliminated 4th on 12 February 2017
Teresa Mannion	RTÉ News reporter	John Nolan; Ryan McShane (Week 7)	Eliminated 5th on 26 February 2017
Katherine Lynch	Comedian & actress	Kai Widdrington; Vitali Kozmin (Week 7)	Eliminated 6th on 5 March 2017
Des Cahill	RTÉ Sport broadcaster	Karen Byrne; Ksenia Zsikhotska (Week 7)	Eliminated 7th on 12 March 2017
Dayl Cronin	Former HomeTown singer	Ksenia Zsikhotska; Valeria Milova (Week 7)	Eliminated 8th on 19 March 2017
Denise McCormack	Red Rock actress	Ryan McShane; John Nolan (Week 7)	Runners-up on 26 March 2017
Aoibhín Garrihy	Former Fair City actress	Vitali Kozmin; Kai Widdrington (Week 7)	Runners-up on 26 March 2017
Aidan O'Mahony	Former Kerry GAA footballer	Valeria Milova; Karen Byrne (Week 7)	Winners on 26 March 2017

== Scoring chart ==
Couple	Place	1	2	3	1/2+3	4	5	6	7	8	7+8	9	10	11	12
Aidan & Valeria	1	19	—	16	35	16	21	19	15	22	37	28	22+2=24	20+24=44	25+25+30=80
Aoibhín & Vitali	2	—	21	22	43	26	25	28	28	26	54	29	25+4=29	30+30=60	29+29+30=88
Denise & Ryan	2	—	22	26	48	26	27	25	26	27	53	22	30+3=33	28+27=55	30+30+30=90
Dayl & Ksenia	4	23	—	19	42	27	26	22	30	28	58	25	27+5=32	28+26=54	
Des C. & Karen	5	16	—	18	34	14	18	12	17	19	36	17	19+1=20		
Katherine & Kai	6	—	18	18	36	16	22	21	21	23	44	19			
Teresa & John	7	—	16	15	31	12	16	15	18	16	34				
Des B. & Giulia	8	18	—	21	39	23	24	24							
Dr. Eva & Sean	9	—	13	18	31	12	14								
Thalia & Curtis	10	—	16	21	37	20									
Hughie & Emily	11	15	—	17	32										

Red numbers indicate the couples with the lowest score for each week.
Green numbers indicate the couples with the highest score for each week.
the couple eliminated that week
the returning couple that was called forward and eventually last to be called safe, but was not necessarily in the bottom
the returning couple that finished in the bottom two and competed in the Dance-Off
the winning couple
the runner-up couple

=== Average chart ===
This table only counts for dances scored on a traditional 30-points scale. Extra points from the "Ballroom Blitz" are not included.

Rank by average	Place	Couple	Total points	Number of dances	Total average
1	2	Aoibhín & Vitali	378	14	27.0
2	2	Denise & Ryan	376	14	26.9
3	4	Dayl & Ksenia	281	11	25.6
4	8	Des B. & Giulia	110	5	22.0
5	1	Aidan & Valeria	302	14	21.6
6	6	Katherine & Kai	158	8	19.8
7	10	Thalia & Curtis	57	3	19.0
8	5	Des C. & Karen	150	9	16.7
9	11	Hughie & Emily	32	2	16.0
10	7	Teresa & John	108	7	15.4
11	9	Dr. Eva & Sean	57	4	14.3

== Highest and lowest scoring performances ==
The highest and lowest performances in each dance according to the judges' scale are as follows.

Dance	Celebrity	Highest score	Celebrity	Lowest score
Tango	Denise McCormack	30	Teresa Mannion	16
Cha-cha-cha	Denise McCormack	27	Des Cahill	12
Salsa	Dayl Cronin; Denise McCormack	30	Dr. Eva Orsmond	13
Foxtrot	Aoibhín Garrihy	28	Teresa Mannion	15
Charleston	Denise McCormack; Aoibhín Garrihy	30	Dayl Cronin; Katherine Lynch	23
Waltz	Aidan O'Mahony	22	Hughie Maughan	17
Quickstep	Dayl Cronin	26	Teresa Mannion	12
Jive	Aoibhín Garrihy	29	Teresa Mannion	18
Rumba	Aoibhín Garrihy	29	Thalia Heffernan	21
Paso doble	Dayl Cronin	27	Aidan O'Mahony; Teresa Mannion	16
American Smooth	Denise McCormack; Aidan O'Mahony	25	Dr. Eva Orsmond	12
Contemporary Ballroom	Aoibhín Garrihy	30	Des Bishop	23
Samba	Denise McCormack	27	Aidan O'Mahony	15
Viennese waltz	Dayl Cronin; Denise McCormack	26	Des Cahill	19
"Ballroom Blitz"	Dayl Cronin	5	Des Cahill	1
Showdance	Aidan O'Mahony; Aoibhín Garrihy; Denise McCormack	30		

== Couples' highest and lowest scoring dances ==
Couple	Highest scoring dance	Lowest scoring dance
Aidan & Valeria	Showdance (30)	Samba (15)
Aoibhín & Vitali	Contemporary Ballroom; Charleston; Showdance (30)	Cha-cha-cha (21)
Denise & Ryan	Charleston; Tango; Salsa; Showdance (30)	Jive; Quickstep (22)
Dayl & Ksenia	Salsa (30)	Tango (19)
Des C. & Karen	Viennese waltz Jive (19)	Cha-cha-cha (12)
Katherine & Kai	Charleston (23)	Samba (16)
Teresa & John	Jive (18)	Quickstep (12)
Des B. & Giulia	Cha-cha-cha; Paso doble (24)	Tango (18)
Dr. Eva & Sean	Foxtrot (18)	American Smooth (12)
Thalia & Curtis	Rumba (21)	Quickstep (16)
Hughie & Emily	Waltz (17)	Cha-cha-cha (15)

== Weekly scores and songs ==
Unless indicated otherwise, individual judges scores in the charts below (given in parentheses) are listed in this order from left to right: Brian Redmond, Loraine Barry, Julian Benson.

=== Week 1 ===
Running order (Men)

Couple	Score	Dance	Music
Des B. & Giulia	18 (5, 6, 7)	Tango	"Libertango"—Astor Piazzolla
Hughie & Emily	15 (4, 5, 6)	Cha-cha-cha	"King"—Years & Years
Aidan & Valeria	19 (6, 6, 7)	Salsa	"Fireball"—Pitbull feat. John Ryan
Des C. & Karen	16 (5, 5, 6)	Foxtrot	"Moondance"—Van Morrison
Dayl & Ksenia	23 (7, 8, 8)	Charleston	"My Way"—Calvin Harris

=== Week 2 ===
Running order (Women)

Couple	Score	Dance	Music
Aoibhín & Vitali	21 (7, 7, 7)	Cha-cha-cha	"Want to Want Me"—Jason Derulo
Katherine & Kai	18 (6, 6, 6)	Waltz	"If You Go Away"—Damita Jo DeBlanc
Thalia & Curtis	16 (5, 5, 6)	Quickstep	"Counting Stars"—OneRepublic
Dr. Eva & Sean	13 (4, 4, 5)	Salsa	"Dr. Beat"—Miami Sound Machine
Teresa & John	16 (5, 5, 6)	Tango	"Here Comes the Rain Again"—Eurythmics
Denise & Ryan	22 (7, 7, 8)	Jive	"Shake It Off"—Taylor Swift

=== Week 3 ===
Running order

Couple	Score	Dance	Music	Result
Katherine & Kai	18 (6, 6, 6)	Cha-cha-cha	"Express Yourself"—Madonna	Safe
Dayl & Ksenia	19 (6, 6, 7)	Tango	"Drag Me Down"—One Direction	Safe
Aidan & Valeria	16 (5, 5, 6)	Quickstep	"Little Talks"—Of Monsters and Men	Safe
Dr. Eva & Sean	18 (6, 6, 6)	Foxtrot	"Let's Do It, Let's Fall in Love"—Ella Fitzgerald	Last to be called safe
Des B. & Giulia	21 (7, 7, 7)	Salsa	"Club Tropicana"—Wham!	Safe
Hughie & Emily	17 (5, 6, 6)	Waltz	"What the World Needs Now is Love"—Will Young	Eliminated
Teresa & John	15 (5, 5, 5)	Cha-cha-cha	"Stronger (What Doesn't Kill You)"—Kelly Clarkson	Safe
Thalia & Curtis	21 (7, 7, 7)	Rumba	"High Hopes"—Kodaline	Last to be called safe
Denise & Ryan	26 (8, 9, 9)	Tango	"El Tango de Roxanne"—from Moulin Rouge!	Safe
Des C. & Karen	18 (6, 6, 6)	Paso doble	"Malagueña"—Ernesto Lecuona	Safe
Aobhín & Vitali	22 (7, 7, 8)	Quickstep	"Crazy Stupid Love"—Cheryl Cole feat. Tinie Tempah	Safe

=== Week 4: Movie Week ===
Running order

Couple	Score	Dance	Music	Movie	Result
Aidan & Valeria	16 (5, 5, 6)	Paso doble	"The Raiders March"—John Williams	Raiders of the Lost Ark	Safe
Teresa & John	12 (3, 4, 5)	Quickstep	"9 to 5"—Dolly Parton	9 to 5	Last to be called safe
Katherine & Kai	16 (5, 5, 6)	Samba	"Voulez-Vous—ABBA	Mamma Mia!	Safe
Denise & Ryan	26 (8, 9, 9)	Rumba	"I See Fire"—Ed Sheeran	The Hobbit: The Desolation of Smaug	Safe
Dayl & Ksenia	27 (9, 9, 9)	Jive	"Footloose"—Kenny Loggins	Footloose	Last to be called safe
Dr. Eva & Sean	12 (3, 4, 5)	American Smooth	"A Spoonful of Sugar"—Julie Andrews	Mary Poppins	Safe
Des C. & Karen	14 (4, 5, 5)	Salsa	"Soul Bossa Nova"—Quincy Jones	Austin Powers: International Man of Mystery	Safe
Aoibhín & Vitali	26 (8, 9, 9)	Rumba	"Falling Slowly"—Glen Hansard & Markéta Irglová	Once	Safe
Thalia & Curtis	20 (6, 7, 7)	Jive	"Happy"—Pharrell Williams	Despicable Me 2	Eliminated
Des B. & Giulia	23 (7, 8, 8)	Contemporary Ballroom	"Writing's on the Wall"—Sam Smith	Spectre	Safe

=== Week 5 ===
Individual judges scores in the charts below (given in parentheses) are listed in this order from left to right: Brian Redmond, Loraine Barry, Darren Bennett.

Due to an illness, dancer Darren Bennett filled in for Julian Benson for the night.

Running order

Couple	Score	Dance	Music	Result
Denise & Ryan	27 (9, 9, 9)	Samba	"Cheap Thrills"—Sia feat. Sean Paul	Safe
Des C. & Karen	18 (5, 7, 6)	Tango	"Jealousy"—Billy Fury	Safe
Teresa & John	16 (5, 6, 5)	Salsa	"Boogie Wonderland"—Earth, Wind & Fire	Safe
Dayl & Ksenia	26 (8, 9, 9)	Viennese waltz	"Iris"—Goo Goo Dolls	Safe
Katherine & Kai	22 (7, 8, 7)	Foxtrot	"Summertime"—Eva Cassidy	Last to be called safe
Dr. Eva & Sean	14 (5, 5, 4)	Cha-cha-cha	"Nowhere to Run"—Martha and the Vandellas	Eliminated
Aoibhín & Vitali	25 (8, 9, 8)	Viennese waltz	"Dangerous Woman"—Ariana Grande	Safe
Des B. & Giulia	24 (8, 8, 8)	Cha-cha-cha	"Uptown Funk"—Mark Ronson feat. Bruno Mars	Last to be called safe
Aidan & Valeria	21 (7, 7, 7)	American Smooth	"My Baby Just Cares for Me"—Michael Bublé	Safe

=== Week 6: Valentines Week ===
Individual judges scores in the charts below (given in parentheses) are listed in this order from left to right: Brian Redmond, Loraine Barry, Darren Bennett.

Darren Bennett once again filled in for Julian Benson this week.

Running order

Couple	Score	Dance	Music	Result
Teresa & John	15 (5, 5, 5)	Foxtrot	"Somethin' Stupid"—Frank Sinatra & Nancy Sinatra	Safe
Aoibhín & Vitali	28 (9, 10, 9)	Jive	"Dead Ringer for Love"—Meat Loaf feat. Cher	Safe
Aidan & Valeria	19 (6, 7, 6)	Tango	"Easy Lover"—Philip Bailey & Phil Collins	Safe
Katherine & Kai	21 (7, 7, 7)	Quickstep	"You're the One that I Want"—John Travolta & Olivia Newton-John	Safe
Dayl & Ksenia	22 (7, 8, 7)	Foxtrot	"Marvin Gaye"—Charlie Puth feat. Meghan Trainor	Safe
Des B. & Giulia	24 (8, 8, 8)	Paso doble	"When Love Comes to Town"—U2 & B. B. King	Eliminated
Des C. & Karen	12 (4, 4, 4)	Cha-cha-cha	"Don't Go Breaking My Heart"—Elton John & Kiki Dee	Last to be called safe
Denise & Ryan	25 (8, 9, 8)	American Smooth	"Anything Goes"—Tony Bennett & Lady Gaga	Last to be called safe

=== Week 7: Switch-Up Week ===
Individual judges scores in the charts below (given in parentheses) are listed in this order from left to right: Brian Redmond, Loraine Barry, Darren Bennett.

As with the previous two weeks, Darren Bennett once again filled in for Julian Benson.

Guest act: The cast of Sunny Afternoon, performing 'Lola' and 'You Really Got Me'.

Running order

Couple	Score	Dance	Music
Des C. & Ksenia	17 (5, 6, 6)	Samba	"Quando, quando, quando"—Engelbert Humperdinck
Denise & John	26 (8, 9, 9)	Viennese waltz	"Powerful"—Major Lazer feat. Ellie Goulding & Tarrus Riley
Katherine & Vitali	21 (7, 7, 7)	Paso doble	"O Fortuna"—Carl Orff
Dayl & Valeria	30 (10, 10, 10)	Salsa	"Give Me Everything"—Pitbull feat. Ne-Yo, Afrojack & Nayer
Aoibhín & Kai	28 (9, 10, 9)	Foxtrot	"Big Bad Handsome Man"—Imelda May
Teresa & Ryan	18 (6, 6, 6)	Jive	"Tutti Frutti"—Little Richard
Aidan & Karen	15 (5, 5, 5)	Samba	"Mas Que Nada"—Sérgio Mendes

=== Week 8 ===
Individual judges scores in the charts below (given in parentheses) are listed in this order from left to right: Brian Redmond, Loraine Barry, Darren Bennett.

Darren Bennett once again filled in for Julian Benson this week.

Guest act: Róisín O performing 'Give it Up'.

Running order

Couple	Score	Dance	Music	Result
Dayl & Ksenia	28 (9, 9, 10)	Contemporary Ballroom	"Hall of Fame"—The Script feat. will.i.am	Safe
Teresa & John	16 (5, 5, 6)	Paso doble	"Habañera"—Charlotte Church	Eliminated
Denise & Ryan	27 (9, 9, 9)	Salsa	"Vivir Mi Vida"—Marc Anthony	Bottom two
Des C. & Karen	19 (6, 7, 6)	Viennese waltz	"The Marino Waltz"—The Dubliners	Safe
Katherine & Kai	23 (7, 8, 8)	Charleston	"Cabaret"—Liza Minnelli	Safe
Aidan & Valeria	22 (7, 8, 7)	Waltz	"Fly Me to the Moon"—Buddy Greco	Safe
Aoibhín & Vitali	26 (9, 8, 9)	Paso doble	"Spectrum (Say My Name)"—Florence and the Machine	Last to be called safe

Dance-Off

Judges' votes to save

- Bennett: Denise & Ryan
- Redmond: Denise & Ryan
- Barry: Did not vote, but would have voted to save Denise & Ryan.

=== Week 9: Icons Week ===
Julian Benson returned to the judges table after a four-week absence.

Guest act: The cast of Thriller - Live performing 'Man in the Mirror'.

Running order

Couple	Score	Dance	Music	Result
Katherine & Kai	19 (6, 6, 7)	Jive	"Proud Mary"—Tina Turner	Eliminated
Denise & Ryan	22 (7, 7, 8)	Quickstep	"Valerie"—Mark Ronson feat. Amy Winehouse	Safe
Dayl & Ksenia	25 (8, 8, 9)	Cha-cha-cha	"What Do You Mean?"—Justin Bieber	Bottom two
Aidan & Valeria	28 (9, 10, 9)	Charleston	"I Got a Woman"— Rudedog feat. Ray Charles	Last to be called safe
Aoibhín & Vitali	29 (9, 10, 10)	Salsa	"Crazy in Love"—Beyoncé feat. Jay Z	Safe
Des C. & Karen	17 (5, 6, 6)	American Smooth	"Uptown Girl"—Billy Joel	Safe

Dance-Off

Judges' votes to save

- Benson: Dayl & Ksenia
- Redmond: Dayl & Ksenia
- Barry: Did not vote, but would have voted to save Dayl & Ksenia.

=== Week 10 ===
Guest act: Lyra performing 'Emerald'.

Running order

Couple	Score	Dance	Music	Result
Aoibhín & Vitali	25 (8, 8, 9)	Tango	"Objection (Tango)"—Shakira	Bottom two
Des C. & Karen	19 (6, 6, 7)	Jive	"Do You Love Me"—The Contours	Eliminated
Aidan & Valeria	22 (7, 7, 8)	Cha-cha-cha	"Cake by the Ocean"—DNCE	Safe
Denise & Ryan	30 (10, 10, 10)	Charleston	"A Little Party Never Killed Nobody (All We Got)"—Fergie, Q-Tip & GoonRock	Safe
Dayl & Ksenia	27 (9, 9, 9)	Paso doble	"Bamboléo"—Gipsy Kings	Safe
Des C. & Karen; Aidan & Valeria; Denise & Ryan; Aoibhín & Vitali; Dayl & Ksenia	1; 2; 3; 4; 5	"Ballroom Blitz"	"The Ballroom Blitz"—The Sweet	

Dance-Off

Judges' votes to save

- Benson: Aoibhín & Vitali
- Redmond: Aoibhín & Vitali
- Barry: Did not vote, but would have voted to save Aoibhín & Vitali.

=== Week 11: Semifinal ===
Guest act: Riverdance

Running order

Couple	Score	Dance	Music	Result
Denise & Ryan	28 (9, 10, 9)	Contemporary Ballroom	"Take Me to Church"—Hozier	Bottom two
Denise & Ryan	27 (9, 9, 9)	Cha-cha-cha	"Fiebre"—La Lupe	Bottom two
Aidan & Valeria	20 (6, 7, 7)	Jive	"Drive It Like You Stole It"—from Sing Street	Safe
Aidan & Valeria	24 (8, 8, 8)	Viennese waltz	"Somebody to Love"— The cast of Glee	Safe
Dayl & Ksenia	28 (9, 10, 9)	Rumba	"What About Now"—Westlife	Eliminated
Dayl & Ksenia	26 (8, 9, 9)	Quickstep	"Peroxide Swing"—Michael Bublé	Eliminated
Aoibhín & Vitali	30 (10, 10, 10)	Contemporary Ballroom	"Nothing Compares 2 U"—Sinéad O'Connor	Safe
Aoibhín & Vitali	30 (10, 10, 10)	Charleston	"Do Your Thing"—Basement Jaxx	Safe

Dance-Off
For the Dance-Off, Dayl & Ksenia danced their Quickstep, while Denise & Ryan danced their Contemporary Ballroom.

Judges' votes to save

- Benson: Denise & Ryan
- Redmond: Dayl & Ksenia
- Barry: Denise & Ryan

=== Week 12: The Final ===
Guest act: The Vamps performing 'All Night'.

Running order

Couple	Score	Dance	Music	Result
Aidan & Valeria	25 (8, 8, 9)	American Smooth	"My Baby Just Cares for Me"—Michael Bublé	Winner
Aidan & Valeria	25 (8, 8, 9)	Salsa	"Fireball"—Pitbull feat. John Ryan	Winner
Aidan & Valeria	30 (10, 10, 10)	Showdance	"Holding Out for a Hero"—Bonnie Tyler	Winner
Aoibhín & Vitali	29 (9, 10, 10)	Jive	"Dead Ringer for Love"—Meat Loaf feat. Cher	Runner-up
Aoibhín & Vitali	29 (9, 10, 10)	Rumba	"Falling Slowly"—Glen Hansard & Markéta Irglová	Runner-up
Aoibhín & Vitali	30 (10, 10, 10)	Showdance	"Chandelier—Sia	Runner-up
Denise & Ryan	30 (10, 10, 10)	Tango	"El Tango de Roxanne"—from Moulin Rouge!	Runner-up
Denise & Ryan	30 (10, 10, 10)	Salsa	"Vivir Mi Vida"—Marc Anthony	Runner-up
Denise & Ryan	30 (10, 10, 10)	Showdance	"Imagine"—Eva Cassidy	Runner-up

== Dance chart ==
Highest scoring dance
Lowest scoring dance
No dance performed

Couple	Week 1	Week 2	Week 3	Week 4	Week 5	Week 6	Week 7	Week 8	Week 9	Week 10		Week 11		Week 12		
Aidan & Valeria	Salsa	N/A	Quickstep	Paso doble	American Smooth	Tango	Samba (with Karen)	Waltz	Charleston	Cha-cha-cha	Ballroom Blitz	Jive	Viennese waltz	American Smooth	Salsa	Showdance
Aoibhín & Vitali	N/A	Cha-cha-cha	Quickstep	Rumba	Viennese waltz	Jive	Foxtrot (with Kai)	Paso doble	Salsa	Tango	Ballroom Blitz	Contemporary Ballroom	Charleston	Jive	Rumba	Showdance
Denise & Ryan	N/A	Jive	Tango	Rumba	Samba	American Smooth	Viennese waltz (with John)	Salsa	Quickstep	Charleston	Ballroom Blitz	Contemporary Ballroom	Cha-cha-cha	Tango	Salsa	Showdance
Dayl & Ksenia	Charleston	N/A	Tango	Jive	Viennese waltz	Foxtrot	Salsa (with Valeria)	Contemporary Ballroom	Cha-cha-cha	Paso doble	Ballroom Blitz	Rumba	Quickstep			
Des C. & Karen	Foxtrot	N/A	Paso doble	Salsa	Tango	Cha-cha-cha	Samba (with Ksenia)	Viennese waltz	American Smooth	Jive	Ballroom Blitz					
Katherine & Kai	N/A	Waltz	Cha-cha-cha	Samba	Foxtrot	Quickstep	Paso doble (with Vitali)	Charleston	Jive							
Teresa & John	N/A	Tango	Cha-cha-cha	Quickstep	Salsa	Foxtrot	Jive (with Ryan)	Paso doble								
Des B. & Giulia	Tango	N/A	Salsa	Contemporary Ballroom	Cha-cha-cha	Paso doble										
Dr. Eva & Sean	N/A	Salsa	Foxtrot	American Smooth	Cha-cha-cha											
Thalia & Curtis	N/A	Quickstep	Rumba	Jive												
Hughie & Emily	Cha-cha-cha	N/A	Waltz													
