= Luisella Costamagna =

Italian journalist and television presenter

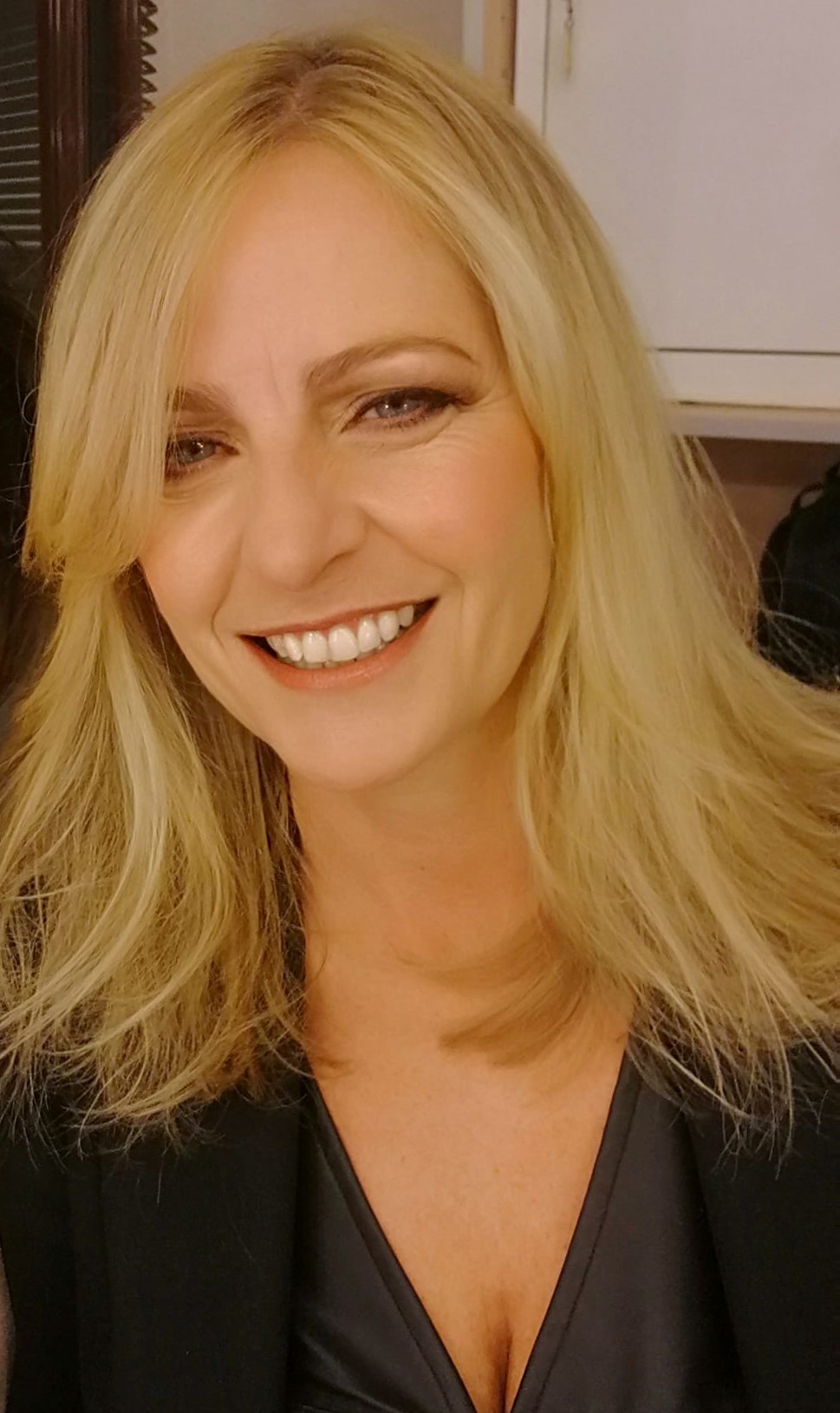
- Born: 16 December 1968 (age 57); Turin, Italy
- Occupations: Journalist and television presenter
- Years active: 1995–present
- Height: 1.74 m (5 ft 9 in)
- Partner: Dario Buzzolan
- Children: Davide Buzzolan

Luisella Costamagna (born 16 December 1968) is an Italian journalist and television presenter.

== Biography ==
Born in Turin, she graduated in Philosophy and became journalist. From 1996 to 1999, she worked as an investigative journalist for Michele Santoro's show "Moby Dick". In the same years she hosted Studio Aperto, the news program of Italia 1. In the following years, she still collaborated with Santoro in some shows broadcast by RAI and hosted Omnibus on La7.

In 2008, she was one of the authors of the TV show AnnoZero. From June 2010 to September 2011, she hosted on La7 the journalistic broadcast "In Onda", together with Luca Telese. In 2011, the broadcaster replaced Costamagna with the journalist Nicola Porro. Costamagna and Telese argued through interviews, and she defined her replacement as "an injustice", accusing the network of male chauvinism. Two months later, Costamagna was hired by Rai 3, where she hosted the prime-time show "Robinson". She was also columnist for the magazines "Diva e donna" and "Il salvagente".

In 2014, she hosted a political news broadcast on Agon Channel and later became a columnist for the newspapers Il Fatto Quotidiano and La Verità. From September 2020 to September 2022, she hosted the daily program Agorà on Rai 3.

From October to December 2022, she participated as a contestant in the seventeenth edition of the famous reality show Ballando con le stelle, the Italian version of Dancing with the Stars, partnering with Pasquale La Rocca. After six weeks, they announced their withdrawal from the competition, on account of an injury suffered by Luisella. However, in the tenth week of programming, Luisella and Pasquale competed for a repechage together with the other couples eliminated from the game and they were voted back by the audience. In the final episode of the show, Luisella and Pasquale were voted as the winners of the contest.

She is an atheist.

== Television ==
- Moby Dick (Italia 1, 1996–1999)
- Studio Aperto (Italia 1, 1999–2000)
- Il raggio verde (Rai 2, 2000–2001)
- Sciuscià (Rai 1, 2000; Rai 2, 2001–2002)
- Donne (Rai 2, 2002)
- Maurizio Costanzo Show – Raccontando (Canale 5, 2004–2005)
- Tutte le mattine (Canale 5, 2004–2006)
- Omnibus (La7, 2007–2010)
- Così stanno le cose (La7, 2007)
- In Onda (La7, 2010–2011)
- Robinson (Rai 3, 2012)
- Servizio pubblico (La7, 2012–2013)
- Giovani a rischio (Crime + Investigation, 2014)
- Lei non-sa chi sono io (Agon Channel, 2014–2015)
- Ieri oggi italiani (Rete 4, 2018)
- Fuori dal coro (Rete 4, 2018–2020) – Panelist
- Agorà (Rai 3, 2020–2022)
- Ballando con le Stelle 17 (Rai 1, 2022) – Winner
