= Ryan Andrews =

Ryan Andrews may refer to:

- Ryan Andrews (director) (born 1981), Welsh film and music video director
- Ryan Andrews (actor) (born 1993), Irish actor
- Ryan Andrews (footballer) (born 2004), English footballer
