= Ballando con le Stelle series 17 =

Ballando con le Stelle
- Season 17
- Celebrity winner: Luisella Costamagna
- Professional winner: Pasquale La Rocca

Release
- Original network: RAI 1
- Original release: 8 October – 23 December 2022

Series chronology
- ← Previous; Series 16 Next → Series 18

The seventeenth series of Ballando con le Stelle was broadcast from 8 October 2022 to 23 December 2022 on RAI 1 and was presented by Milly Carlucci with Paolo Belli and his Big Band.

== Couples ==
| Celebrity | Age | Occupation | Professional partner | Status |
|---|---|---|---|---|
| Marta Flavi | 71 | Television & radio presenter | Simone Arena then Luca Urso | Eliminated 1st on 15 October 2022 |
| Giampiero Mughini | 81 | Journalist & television presenter | Veera Kinnunen | Eliminated 2nd on 5 November 2022 |
| Dario Cassini | 55 | Comedian | Lucrezia Lando | Eliminated 3rd on 12 November 2022 |
| Paola Barale | 55 | Showgirl & television presenter | Roly Maden | Eliminated 4th on 12 November 2022 |
| Enrico Montesano | 77 | Actor, singer & television presenter | Alessandra Tripoli | Ejected |
| Lorenzo Biagiarelli | 31 | Television chef & author | Anastasia Kuzmina | Eliminated 5th on 19 November 2022 |
| Gabriel Garko | 50 | FIlm & television actor | Giada Lini | Walked on 23 December 2022 |
| Iva Zanicchi | 82 | Singer & television presenter | Samuel Peron | Fourth place on 23 December 2022 |
| Rosanna Banfi | 59 | Film & television actress | Simone Casula | Fourth place on 23 December 2022 |
| Alex Di Giorgio | 32 | Former olympic swimmer & model | Moreno Porcu | Fourth place on 23 December 2022 |
| Ema Stokholma | 37 | Television & radio presenter | Angelo Madonia | Third place on 23 December 2022 |
| Alessandro Egger | 31 | Model & actor | Tove Villför | Second place on 23 December 2022 |
| Luisella Costamagna | 52 | Journalist & television presenter | Pasquale La Rocca | Walked on 12 November 2022; Voted back on 18 December 2022; Winners on 23 December 2022 |

== Scoring chart ==
| Couple | Place | 1 | 2 | 1+2 | 3 | 4 | 5 | 3+4+5 | 6 | 7 | 8 | 9 | 8+9 | 10 | 11 |
|---|---|---|---|---|---|---|---|---|---|---|---|---|---|---|---|
| Luisella & Pasquale | 1 | 42 | 37 | 79 | 13 | 25 | 39 + 25 = 64 | 102 | — | | | | | 49 + 30 = 79 | 47 |
| Alessandro & Tove | 2 | 41 | 43 | 84 | 36 | 48 | 36 | 120 | 48 | 37 + 10 + 30 = 77 | 46 | 47 + 10 = 57 | 103 | 40 | 71 |
| Ema & Angelo | 3 | 34 | 40 | 74 | 30 | 44 + 10 = 54 | 40 + 10 = 50 | 134 | 44 | 43 + 10 = 53 | 35 + 28 = 63 | 33 + 10 = 43 | 106 | 47 | 68 |
| Alex & Moreno | 4 | 33 | 44 | 77 | 30 | 46 | 40 | 116 | 48 | 31 | 43 + 10 = 53 | 47 + 10 + 35 = 92 | 145 | 32 + 10 = 42 | 64 |
| Rosanna & Simone | 4 | 22 | 36 | 58 | 47 | 26 + 10 = 36 | 49 + 25 = 74 | 170 | 38 | 34 | 42 | 44 | 86 | 37 – 20 = 17 | 49 |
| Iva & Samuel | 4 | 20 + 25 = 45 | 21 + 10 = 31 | 76 | 32 | 31 + 30 = 61 | 38 | 131 | 35 | 43 | 33 + 29 = 62 | 32 | 94 | 32 – 20 + 10 = 22 | 41 |
| Gabriel & Giada | 7 | 44 | 47 | 91 | 42 | 42 + 10 = 52 | 45 | 139 | 33 + 25 = 58 | 49 + 30 = 79 | 48 | 44 + 10 + 35 = 89 | 137 | 20 | — |
| Lorenzo & Anastasia | 8 | 32 | 32 | 64 | 31 | 39 | 32 | 102 | 38 + 25 = 63 | 42 | | | | 41 + 30 = 71 | |
| Enrico & Alessandra | 9 | 40 | 33 | 73 | 46 | 48 + 30 = 78 | 45 + 10 = 55 | 179 | 43 | | | | | | |
| Paola & Roly | 10 | 28 | 31 | 59 | 28 + 24 = 52 | 31 | 30 – 10 = 20 | 113 | 27 | | | | | — | |
| Dario & Lucrezia | 11 | 22 | 18 – 10 = 8 | 40 | 26 + 24 = 50 | 20 | 18 | 88 | 17 | | | | | 30 | |
| Giampiero & Veera | 12 | 17 + 25 = 42 | 30 + 30 = 60 | 102 | 14 | 26 | 25 – 10 = 15 | 65 | | | | | | 31 | |
| Marta & Simone/Luca | 13 | 29 | 16 | 45 | | | | | | | | | | 41 | |

Red numbers indicate the lowest score for each week.
Green numbers indicate the highest score for each week.
indicates the couple eliminated that week.
indicates the returning couples that finished in the bottom two/three was saved by a second public vote.
indicates the returning couples that finished in the top position and received a bonus for the next week.
indicates the returning couples that finished in the bottom position and received a malus for the next week.
indicates the returning couple that received a bonus.
indicates the couple who quit the competition.
indicates the couple who was ejected from the competition.
indicates the couple was voted back into the competition.
indicates the couple was eliminated but was voted back into the competition by "safe-conduct".
indicates the couple was voted back into the competition but then re-eliminated.
indicates the winning couple.
indicates the runner-up couple.
indicates the third-place couple.
