= Rosanna Lambertucci =

Italian television presenter and writer

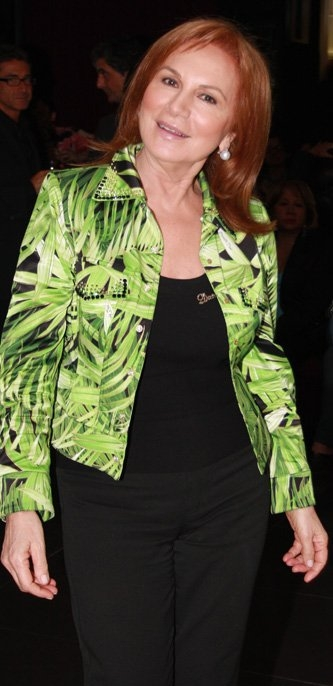
- Born: 30 November 1945 (age 80); Rome, Italy
- Occupations: Author; television presenter; nutrition divulgator
- Years active: 1978–present
- Spouses: Alberto Amodei (m. 1965–2014) Mario Di Cosmo (m. 2023)
- Children: Angelica Amodei

Rosanna Lambertucci (born 30 November 1945) is an Italian author, and television presenter.

== Biography ==
Born in Rome, in 1978 she began working in radio as an author. In 1981, she debuted on national TV as presenter of the program Più sani e più belli (More Healthy and More Beautiful), created by herself. The show, which dealt with topics relating to well-being, medicine and lifestyle, was very popular and successful. It continued to air for seventeen seasons, until 1997. Lambertucci became a journalist and, following the success of her broadcasts, she became a widely followed author. Starting in the 1980s, she published numerous volumes dedicated to health and diets.

In addition to her work as a life coach, Rosanna also hosted entertainment television programs. From 1994 to 1997 she was one of the presenters of the popular game show Luna Park and its spin-off La zingara (The Gypsy).

In 2004 she was among the hosts of the morning show Unomattina Estate. Between 2004 and 2009 she hosted her own regular column on the Sunday show Domenica in. Subsequently, she worked for some satellite and thematic broadcasters including Alice TV and QVC.

In 2023, she took part as a contestant in the eighteenth edition of the dance talent show Ballando con le stelle; eliminated during the fifth episode, she was then brought back in the semi-final, thus reaching the final.

In 1965 she married the television executive Alberto Amodei. They separated in 1988 and had a daughter, Angelica. Over the course of their marriage, Rosanna had five miscarriages and a newborn baby girl who suddenly died. Alberto Amodei died in 2014. Since 2015, Rosanna Lambertucci has been romantically linked to the businessman Mario Di Cosmo, whom she married in 2023.

She considers herself Roman Catholic.

== Television ==
- DSE - Viaggio nella notte secca (Rete 2, 1979)
- DSE - La salute del bambino (Rete 3, 1981)
- DSE - Francesco, ieri e oggi (Rete 2, 1981)
- Più sani e più belli (Rete 2, 1981; Rai 1 1982–1997)
- Esse - Settimanale della Salute (Rai 2, 1982)
- Luna Park (Rai 1, 1994–1997)
- La zingara (Rai 1, 1995–1996)
- Unomattina Estate (Rai 1, 2004)
- Domenica in (Rai 1, 2004–2009)
- Miss Italia (La7, 2016–2017) - Jury
- La salute vien mangiando (Alice TV, 2016–2023)
- Home Shopping (QVC, 2017–2023)
- In gran forma (Alma TV, 2022–2023)
- Ballando con le Stelle (Rai 1, 2023) – Contestant
- BellaMa' (Rai 2, 2024)
