= Des Bishop =

American-Irish comedian (born 1975)

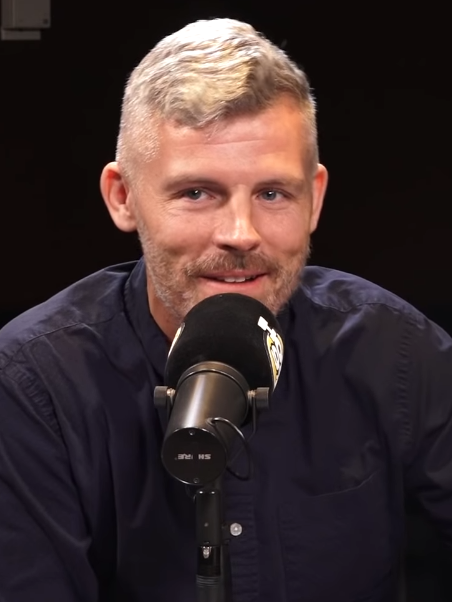
- Bishop in 2018
- Born: Desmond Ryan Bishop; November 12, 1975 (age 50); London, England
- Other names: Deasún Mac an Easpaig; Bi Hansheng (毕瀚生)
- Education: University College Cork (B.A.)
- Occupation: Stand-up comedian
- Spouse: Hannah Berner (m. 2022)
- Website: www.desbishop.net

Desmond Ryan Bishop (Irish: Deasún Mac an Easpaig; born November 12, 1975) is an American-Irish comedian. Born in London, he was brought up in New York and moved to Ireland at the age of 14.

== Early life ==
Bishop attended St. Francis Preparatory School in the Fresh Meadows neighbourhood of the New York City borough of Queens. At the age of 16, he began school at St Peter's College, Wexford in Ireland. He later re-sat his Leaving Certificate at Blackrock College, Dublin. He has a degree in English and history from University College Cork.

== Career ==
Bishop has worked as a comic in Ireland since the late 1990s. He began hosting shows and honing his act at the International Comedy Cellar, a venue set up by Irish comics such as Ardal O'Hanlon, Kevin Gildea, and Barry Murphy.

Bishop appeared in the 2002 film In America, in which he played a high stockbroker rapping in the back of a New York taxi cab.

He reached a broader audience after his TV show The Des Bishop Work Experience screened on RTÉ Two in 2004. The show featured him attempting to survive for one month working a minimum wage job in various parts of Ireland. During the series, he worked at Abrakebabra, Waterford; The Aqua-dome, Tralee; Superquinn, Dundalk; and the Central Hotel, Dublin.

A 2006 TV show named Joy in the Hood featured him travelling to deprived areas of Ireland's major cities and mentoring local people in stand-up comedy.

Bishop received significant criticism during a show in 2006 for ableist comments he aimed at an audience member who was in a wheelchair and had an intellectual disability. Bishop later apologised for his actions.

In 2017, Bishop took part in the first series of the Irish version of Dancing with the Stars. He was partnered with Italian dancer Giulia Dotta. They were eliminated in the sixth week of the competition, finishing in eighth place.

== Personal life ==
Bishop's brother Aidan works as a comedian in Ireland. Both are involved in running the International Comedy Club. His father died from lung cancer in February 2011, and on March 19, 2019, his mother Eileen died at the age of 77, after a long illness. Bishop's cousin is the Social Democrats politician Sinéad Gibney.

In February 2021, Bishop became engaged to Hannah Berner, a comedian and former main cast member on the Bravo reality television series Summer House. They married at Bishop's home in The Hamptons in New York State on May 13, 2022.

After being diagnosed with testicular cancer in 2000, Bishop turned his experiences into comedy material.

=== Languages ===
Bishop speaks fluent Mandarin Chinese and has also worked in China where he has adopted the Chinese stage name Bi Hansheng (毕瀚生) and has appeared in a few Chinese dating shows.

Bishop's TV show In the Name of the Fada premiered in 2008. It chronicles Bishop's undertaking to learn Irish to a level sufficient to perform a stand-up act in the language. During this period he achieved fluency in the language. He later used his Irish-language skills to sing an Irish-language version of the song "Jump Around" called Léim Thart.

== Works ==
=== Standup DVDs ===
- Des Bishop – Live at Vicar Street (2003)
- Des Bishop – Live (2005)
- Des Bishop – Fitting In (2006)
- Des Bishop – Tongues (2007)
- Des Bishop – Desfunctional (2009)
- Des Bishop - Of All People (2024)

=== Book ===
- Bishop, Des (2011). My Dad Was Nearly James Bond. Penguin Ireland. ISBN 978-1-84488-278-6. LCCN 2012358505. OCLC 751728732. OL 26038309M.
