= Silver Studs =

Australian band

Silver Studs / The Studs
- Origin: Brisbane, Australia
- Genres: Pop rock
- Years active: 1975–1977
- Labels: Philips Records, Wizard Records
- Past members: Lance Reynolds; Gino Latorre; Keith Reed; Paul Stevens; Vivien Grayson

Silver Studs was an Australian rock 'n' roll band formed in 1975 by Lance Reynolds, Keith Reed and Gino Latorre.

The group released one studio album which peaked at number 26 on the Australian charts in 1976.

The band renamed themselves as The Studs in 1977.

== History ==
The Silver Studs originated in Brisbane in 1975. They signed to the Philips label and released the single "My Teenage Dream".

In February 1976, they supported The Hollies on their Australian tour and in May 1976, released their rendition of "Happy Days", the theme song to the US TV comedy of the same name. The song peaked at number 5 on the charts, which was followed by "Dance with a Dolly", which peaked at number 17 in September. The band's debut album Happy Days was released in September 1976 and peaked at number 26.

In 1977, the band, now a duo consisting of Reynolds and Latorre renamed themselves The Studs.

The first single was "Funky Feet", written by ABBA’s Benny Anderson and Bjorn Ulvaeus, in June 1977 which peaked at number 20. The duo completed an album which was released in 1978.

== Discography ==
=== Albums ===
List of studio albums, with Australian positions
Title	Details	Peak chart positions
Title	Details	AUS
Happy Days (As The Silver Studs)	Released: September 1976; Label: Philips (6357 042-2); Formats: LP	26
The New Studs Album (As The Studs)	Released: 1987; Label: Big Time/ Wizard (BZL 224); Formats: LP, Cassette	-

=== Singles ===
List of singles, with Australian chart positions
Year	Title	Peak chart positions	Album
Year	Title	AUS	Album
Credited as The Silver Studs
1975	"My Teenage Dream"	-	non album single
1976	"Happy Days"	5	Happy Days
1976	"Dance with a Dolly (With a Hole in Her Stockin')"	17	Happy Days
Credited as The Studs
1977	"Funky Feet"	20	The New Studs Album
1978	"Today I Met The Girl I'm Gonna Marry"	-	The New Studs Album
1978	"Dr. Bop"	43	The New Studs Album
