= Omnibus (talk show) =

- Starring: theme song intro the xx
- Country of origin: Italy
- Original language: Italian

Production
- Running time: 75 mins.

Original release
- Network: La7
- Release: March 18, 1998

Omnibus is an Italian breakfast television news and talk show, broadcast on La7 since 1998.
