= Ksenia Zsikhotska =

Ukrainian dancer and choreographer

- Born: 11 August 1989 (age 36); Ivano-Frankivsk, Ukrainian SSR, Soviet Union
- Occupations: Dancer, Choreographer
- Known for: Dancing with the Stars (Irish series)

Ksenia Zsikhotska (Ukrainian: Ксенія Ціхоцька, sometimes romanised Zhikhotska; born 11 August 1989) is a Ukrainian dancer and choreographer. She is best known for her role as a professional dancer on Dancing with the Stars. She, alongside professional partner, Ryan McShane, were the 2016 United Kingdom & British Latin Professional Champions & British Show Dance Champions.

== Early life ==
Zsikhotska was born in Ivano-Frankivsk, Ukraine. She started folk dancing at the age of four and took up ballroom when she moved to United Kingdom with her mother.

== Career ==
In 2015, Zsikhotska toured with Strictly Come Dancing professional Brendan Cole's A Night to Remember tour across the UK and Ireland.

In 2016, Zsikhotska and partner, Ryan McShane, were crowned United Kingdom & British Latin Professional Champions & British Show Dance Champions.

== Television career ==
=== Got to Dance ===
In 2013, Zsihotska took part in the Sky One dance competition show, Got to Dance alongside partner, Ryan McShane. They received three gold stars from the judges and advanced to the next round before being eliminated.

=== Britain's Got Talent (series 8) ===
In 2014, Zsikhotska helped establish the ballroom dance group, Kings & Queens, alongside future Strictly Come Dancing professionals, Katya Jones and Neil Jones as well as her future Dancing with the Stars fellow professionals, Ryan McShane and Kai Widdrington on Britain's Got Talent. Kings & Queens reached the semi-finals of the series before being eliminated.

=== Dancing with the Stars Ireland ===
In 2017, Zsikhotska was announced as one of the professional dancers for the first series of Dancing with the Stars. She was partnered with singer, Dayl Cronin. Cronin and Zsikhotska made it all the way to the semifinals of the competition before being eliminated and finishing in 4th place.

In 2018, Zsikhotska was partnered with RTÉ broadcaster, Marty Morrissey. Despite receiving low scores throughout their time on the show, the couple made it all the way to week 8 of the competition, finishing in seventh place.

In 2019, Zsikhotska was partnered with Ireland and Munster Rugby player, Peter Stringer. The couple made it to week 8 of the competition; marking the second year in a row that Zsikhotska finished in seventh place.

Series	Partner	Place
1	Dayl Cronin	4th
2	Marty Morrissey	7th
3	Peter Stringer	7th

Highest and Lowest Scoring Per Dance

Dance	Partner	Highest	Partner	Lowest
American Smooth	Peter Stringer	20	Marty Morrissey	15
Cha-cha-cha	Dayl Cronin	25	Marty Morrissey	8
Charleston	Peter Stringer	25	Marty Morrissey	12
Contemporary Ballroom	Dayl Cronin	28		
Foxtrot	Dayl Cronin	22	Marty Morrissey	16
Jive	Dayl Cronin	27		
Paso Doble	Dayl Cronin	27	Peter Stringer	20
Quickstep	Dayl Cronin	26	Marty Morrissey	12
Rumba	Dayl Cronin	28	Marty Morrissey	16
Salsa	Peter Stringer	16		
Samba	Des Cahill^{1}	17		
Showdance				
Tango	Dayl Cronin	21		
Viennese Waltz	Dayl Cronin	26	Peter Stringer	19
Waltz				

^{1} This score was awarded during Switch-Up Week.

=== Series 1 ===
Celebrity partner
Dayl Cronin; Average: 25.5; Place: 4th

Week No.	Dance/Song	Judges' score			Total	Result
Week No.	Dance/Song	Redmond	Barry	Benson	Total	Result
1	Charleston / "My Way"	7	7	7	21	No elimination
2	No dance performed	-	-	-	-	No elimination
3	Tango / "Drag Me Down"	7	7	7	21	Safe
4	Jive / "Footloose"	9	9	9	27	Safe
5	Viennese Waltz / "Iris"	8	9	9	26	Safe
6	Foxtrot / "Marvin Gaye"	7	8	7	22	Safe
7	Samba / "Quando quando quando"	5	6	6	17	No elimination Switch-Up Week with Des Cahill
8	Contemporary Ballroom / "Hall of Fame"	9	9	10	28	Safe
9	Cha-cha-cha / "What Do You Mean?"	8	8	9	25	Bottom two
10	Paso Doble / "Bamboléo"; Ballroom Blitz / "The Ballroom Blitz"	9 Extra	9; 5	9 Points	27; 32	Safe
11	Rumba / "What About Now"; Quickstep / "Peroxide Swing"	9; 8	10; 9	9; 9	28; 26	Eliminated

=== Series 2 ===
Celebrity partner
Marty Morrissey; Average: 13.3; Place: 7th

Week No.	Dance/Song	Judges' score			Total	Result
Week No.	Dance/Song	Redmond	Barry	Benson	Total	Result
1	Quickstep / "You're Such a Good Looking Woman"	3	4	5	12	No elimination
2	No dance performed	-	-	-	-	No elimination
3	Cha-cha-cha / "I Got You (I Feel Good)"	2	2	4	8	Safe
4	American Smooth / "Pretty Irish Girl"	4	5	6	15	Safe
5	Charleston / "We No Speak Americano"	3	4	5	12	Safe
6	Quickstep / "L-O-V-E"	5	5	6	16	No elimination Switch-Up Week with Rob Heffernan
7	Foxtrot / "Raindrops Keep Fallin' on My Head"	5	5	6	16	Safe
8	Rumba / "The Lady in Red"	5	5	6	16	Eliminated

=== Series 3 ===
Celebrity partner
Peter Stringer; Average: 18.6; Place: 7th

Week No.	Dance/Song	Judges' score			Total	Result
Week No.	Dance/Song	Redmond	Barry	Benson	Total	Result
1	Salsa / "Come with Me"	5	5	6	16	No elimination
2	No dance performed	-	-	-	-	No elimination
3	Quickstep / "Wake Me Up"	5	4	5	14	Safe
4	Paso Doble / "Un Poco Loco"	6	7	7	20	Safe
5	Viennese Waltz / "A Thousand Years"	6	6	7	19	Safe
6	Quickstep / "Are You Gonna Be My Girl"	6	6	7	19	No elimination Switch-Up Week with Johnny Ward
7	Charleston / "Pencil Full of Lead"	8	9	8	25	Safe
8	American Smooth / "New York, New York"	6	7	7	20	Eliminated

== Personal life ==
Zsikhotska and professional partner, Ryan McShane were in a relationship previously.
