= Teresa Mannion =

Irish journalist and broadcaster

- Born: 15 September 1961 (age 64); Ballygall, Dublin, Ireland
- Occupation: RTÉ News regional reporter
- Employer: RTÉ
- Spouse: Dave O'Connell
- Children: 2

Teresa Mannion (born 15 September 1961) is an Irish journalist and broadcaster with RTÉ, Ireland's national radio and television station, where she has been the RTÉ News regional reporter based in the west of Ireland since 2007.

In December 2015, Mannion's live reporting from Galway during Storm Desmond went on to go viral online. Her subsequent rise in fame led to becoming a contestant on the first Irish series of Dancing with the Stars.

== Career ==
After completing media studies at the former College of Commerce in Rathmines in the 1980s, Mannion became a children's television presenter. She presented many programmes for the RTÉ children's department, including Top Club, Blockbuster, Zero and Youngline, for which she won a national Jacob's Award in 1983. Mannion has worked as a broadcast news reporter for RTÉ News since 2000. She initially worked on the RTÉ Television desk, reported for Morning Ireland and presented on Oireachtas TV. Mannion has been the RTÉ regional reporter based in the west of Ireland since April 2007. She also frequently reports for the Nationwide magazine programme.

In June 2026, Mannion announced her retirement from RTÉ after over 40 years in the organisation and is due to leave RTÉ in September 2026.

=== Storm Desmond ===
Mannion reported for RTÉ News from Salthill during 2015's Storm Desmond. Due to the dramatic nature of her delivery, footage from the reports for Six One and Nine O'Clock News, both raw and altered (merged with fictional storms, or songified) was shared over social media, and soon became a viral phenomenon.

Mannion was interviewed by Ryan Tubridy's The Late Late Show and Seven Network's The Morning Show about her new-found fame. She was a contestant on Dancing with the Stars in 2017.

== Personal life ==
Mannion, one of seven siblings, was raised in Ballygall in the northern suburbs of Dublin city and lived for a time in Terenure. She attended St. Mary's Holy Faith secondary school. Her father was a train driver with the DART and her mother was a homebuilder. Mannion moved to Galway in 2007 when she was appointed RTÉ's regional reporter, having lived previously in Athlone. Mannion is married to journalist and group editor of the Connacht Tribune, Dave O'Connell; they have two adult sons, Tom and Cian. Mannion is a survivor of triple-negative breast cancer (TNBC), for which she was diagnosed in 2013.
