= Pratt & McClain =

American musical duo

- Origin: United States
- Genres: Rock and roll
- Label: Dunhill
- Past members: Truett Pratt; Jerry McClain

Pratt & McClain were an American musical duo known originally called Brother Love consisting of Jerry McClain and Truett Pratt, along with various sidemen. They scored a Billboard No. 5 hit in 1976 with "Happy Days", the theme to the sitcom of the same name, written and performed in a nostalgic 1950s rock and roll style. It was their only success, making them a one-hit wonder.

== Band history ==
Truett Pratt grew up in San Antonio, Texas, and sang in his church choir. Jerry McClain also sang in the choir in his hometown of Pasadena, California.

McClain formed his first band, American Scene, with Michael Omartian in the mid-1960s. In 1970, Omartian began a successful record producing career, eventually recording hits for Michael Bolton, Christopher Cross, Donna Summer, Rod Stewart, Amy Grant, Gary Chapman and 4HIM, among others. In the early 1970s he introduced McClain to Pratt. They formed a band called Brother Love and began recording commercial jingles.

In 1974, the duo decided to expand into mainstream rock and roll. They changed the act's name to Pratt & McClain, signed a recording contract with Dunhill Records and recorded an eponymous album. In 1976, the band jumped to Reprise Records (a Warner Bros. Records subsidiary).

That year, the producers of ABC-TV's successful sitcom Happy Days decided to replace its theme song, Bill Haley and the Comets' "Rock Around the Clock", with a new song written especially for the show. The tune was written by Norman Gimbel and Charles Fox, who also wrote themes for Love, American Style, Wonder Woman, Laverne & Shirley and The Love Boat. Omartian was chosen to produce the song and he recommended Pratt & McClain to record it. Multiple short arrangements were produced for the show and its promotional vehicles, and a full-length version was recorded for popular release.

"Happy Days" went to No. 5 in the Billboard Hot 100 chart in early 1976, and was included on Pratt & McClain's second LP, Pratt & McClain Featuring Happy Days. The single also peaked at No. 31 in the UK Singles Chart. The follow-up, a cover of Mitch Ryder's "Devil with the Blue Dress On", peaked at US No. 71 in the summer of 1976.

The band never charted again, but their lone top-40 single endures on the Happy Days perpetual syndication run, MeTV's nightly lineup, and "oldies" radio stations around the country.

Truett Pratt now runs a production/consulting company named Let's Dance Productions in San Antonio.Truett also owns the Elbow Room in San Antonio where he jams every Saturday. Jerry McClain owns Happy Days Rock Revival in Los Angeles.

== Discography ==
=== Albums ===
- Pratt & McClain (Dunhill, 1974)
- Pratt & McClain feat. Happy Days (Reprise/Warner Brothers, 1976), peak #190

=== Singles ===
- "Happy Days" (Reprise/Warner Brothers, 1976) U.S. Billboard Hot 100 #5, AUS #20
- "Devil with a Blue Dress On" (Reprise/Warner Brothers, 1976) U.S. #71

== See also ==
- List of 1970s one-hit wonders in the United States
