= Ryan Andrews (actor) =

Irish actor from Donaghmede, Dublin

- Born: 31 March 1993 (age 32); Dublin, Ireland
- Occupation: Actor
- Television: Fair City

Ryan Andrews (born 31 March 1993) is an Irish actor from Donaghmede, Dublin. He is best known for his role as Sean Cassidy in the Irish soap opera, Fair City, for which he has starred in since 2008.

== Career ==
Andrews rose to prominence in 2007 following his supporting role in the popular Irish RTÉ drama series, The Clinic.

In 2008, Andrews was cast as schoolboy, Sean Cassidy, in the RTÉ soap opera, Fair City. Sean has been at the centre of some of the programme's biggest storylines, including being a suspect in the 2018 Karen O'Neill murder storyline.

Over the years, Andrews has appeared in many short films including 2010's Tribeca Film Festival-nominated, The Pool.

In 2012, Andrews joined Pauline McLynn and Deirdre O'Kane in the Gaiety Theatre production of Fiona Looney's play, Greener. In 2013, he starred alongside Seána Kerslake in the Irish touring production of The Bruising of Clouds. In 2016, Andrews played, Irish poet and writer, Brendan Behan, in the Jim and Peter Sheridan production of Meet the Quare Fellow starring alongside Gary Cooke.

Andrews has been a mainstay in the Irish Christmas pantomime scene since 2004, having appeared in the Olympia Theatre annual panto every single year since his debut.

Andrews appeared on the fourth season of the Irish edition of Dancing with the Stars in 2020.

== Personal life ==
Andrews was born and raised in Donaghmede, a suburb in North Dublin.

Andrews has been in a relationship with actress, dancer, and primary school teacher Michaela O'Neill since 2009. They met while starring in the Olympia Theatre panto together. In August 2021, the couple announced their engagement.

Since 2016, Andrews has been the Director of Drama in the Dublin stage school, StageKidz Academy with two locations in Dublin.

== Filmography ==
Year	Film/Television	Role	Notes
2007	Frankie	Frankie	Short film
2007	The Sound of People	Boy at pool	Short film
2007–2008	The Clinic	Ian Smith	
2008–	Fair City	Sean Cassidy	
2009	Savage	Youth 1	
2010	The Pool	Charlie	Short film
2011	Prodigal Son	Joe	Short film
2012	Shooting the Director	Ryan	Short film
2012	Alia	Danny	Short film
2013	A Dry Christmas	James	Short film
2015	Achill	Aedan	Short film
2017	Gone	Paul	Short film
2020	Dancing with the Stars	Runner-Up, Series 4	
