= Pasquale La Rocca =

Italian dancer and choreographer

- Born: 24 June 1989 (age 37); Naples, Italy
- Occupations: Dancer; Choreographer
- Years active: 15
- Known for: Dancing with the Stars Belgium; Dancing with the Stars Ireland; Ballando con le Stelle
- Height: 1.82 m (6 ft 0 in)

Pasquale La Rocca is an Italian professional dancer and choreographer. He is best known for his performances on Burn the Floor, Strictly Come Dancing, and Dancing with the Stars, where he achieved a record five consecutive wins across the franchise.

== Early life ==
La Rocca was born in Naples, Italy, and began dancing at a young age. He trained in multiple styles before focusing on Ballroom and Latin. He went on to become Italian Champion and World Finalist in the Under-21 category.

== Competitive Dance Career ==
In 2014, Pasquale La Rocca joined the Broadway production Burn the Floor, touring internationally across London's West End, the United States, Australia, Japan, South Africa, and China. During this period, he rose to the positions of principal dancer, dance captain, and assistant choreographer.

In 2017, he performed as principal dancer alongside Flavia Cacace in the Tango Moderno tour.

In 2018, he appeared on the Strictly Come Dancing Blackpool Special, and in the years that followed he continued to feature in several Strictly Come Dancing specials.

In 2019, he joined Dianne Buswell, Amy Dowden, and Chloe Hewitt on their Here Come the Girls UK tour, and the same year made his debut as a professional on Dancing with the Stars Belgium, where he secured his first victory on the show.

In 2020, he continued his winning streak, joining Dancing with the Stars Ireland and once again taking home the trophy.

In 2022, Pasquale enjoyed one of the most significant years of his career: he returned to DWTS Ireland for another victorious season, achieved a Guinness World Record with Strictly star Dianne Buswell, and reunited with Burn the Floor for its 25th Anniversary Tour, performing in a limited UK season alongside Strictly Come Dancing professionals, which closed with a celebrated run in London's West End. That same year, he was invited as a guest choreographer on ITV's The Masked Dancer and joined Italy's Ballando con le Stelle, where he quickly became a fan favourite.

In 2023 and 2024, Pasquale starred as principal dancer and dance captain in Giovanni Pernice's UK shows.

== Television career ==
La Rocca first appeared on television with Strictly Come Dancing (BBC One). He later joined Dancing with the Stars, where he made history by winning five consecutive seasons across Belgium, Ireland, and Italy—the longest winning streak in the franchise's history.

In Italy, he became a professional dancer on Ballando con le Stelle (Rai 1), the Italian version of Strictly Come Dancing. Over five consecutive seasons, he won two, finished runner-up in the third, and came in third in the fourth.

In 2026, he competed in and won the second season of the Italian reality television series The Traitors Italia, broadcast on Amazon Prime Video.

== Dancing with the Stars ==
=== Belgium ===
In September 2019, La Rocca joined the cast of the second series of the second incarnation (seventh overall) of the Belgian version of Dancing with the Stars. He was partnered with influencer, Julie Vermeire. On 10 November 2019, Vermeire and La Rocca won the series.

Series	Partner	Place
7	Julie Vermeire	1st

==== Performances with Julie Vermeire ====
Week No.	Dance/Song	Judges' score				Total	Result
Week No.	Dance/Song	Brocatus	Louwyck	Leunis	Kooijman	Total	Result
1	Samba / "Shape of You"	7	7	6	6	26	No elimination
2	Tango / "Copycat"	7	8	7	8	30	Safe
3	Freestyle / "Counting Stars"	7	8	7	8	30	Safe
4	Rumba / "Read All About It, Pt. III"	8	9	7	8	32	Safe
5	Salsa / "Súbeme la Radio"; Jive Marathon / "Faith"	8 Awarded	9; 12	9 extra	9 points	35; 47	Safe
6	Modern / "Bad Guy"	9	9	8	10	36	Safe
7	Quickstep / "Puttin' On the Ritz"; Cha-Cha-Cha / "El Anillo"	9; 8	9; 9	10; 9	10; 9	38; 35	Safe
8	Jive / "Dance with Me Tonight"; Freestyle / "Instruction"; Freestyle / "Counting Stars"	9; 10; No	9; 10 scores	8; 10 were	9; 10 awarded	35; 40 -	Winners

=== Ireland ===
On 12 November 2019, just two days after he won the Belgian version, it was confirmed that La Rocca would be joining the cast of the fourth series of the Irish version of the show as a professional dancer. He partnered radio broadcaster, Lottie Ryan. Due to the COVID-19 pandemic, the series was cut short by one week. On 15 March 2020, Ryan and La Rocca won the series.
During the fifth series of the show, La Rocca partnered former jockey, Nina Carberry. On 27 March 2022, Carberry and La Rocca won the series, marking his second consecutive win on the show and third of the worldwide franchise. On 24 November 2022, due to scheduling conflicts resulting from his participation in the Italian series, La Rocca announced that he was not returning for the sixth series in 2023.

Series	Partner	Place
4	Lottie Ryan	1st
5	Nina Carberry	1st

Highest and Lowest Scoring Per Dance

Dance	Partner	Highest	Partner	Lowest
American Smooth	Lottie Ryan; Nina Carberry	29		
Cha-cha-cha	Lottie Ryan	30	Nina Carberry	21
Charleston	Nina Carberry	30	Lottie Ryan	25
Contemporary Ballroom	Lottie Ryan	25		
Foxtrot				
Jive	Nina Carberry	26	Lottie Ryan	21
Paso Doble	Nina Carberry	30	Lottie Ryan	28
Quickstep	Lottie Ryan	30	Nina Carberry	19
Rumba	Nina Carberry	25		
Salsa	Lottie Ryan	28	Nina Carberry	24
Samba	Lottie Ryan	29		
Showdance	Nina Carberry	29		
Tango	Lottie Ryan	23	Nina Carberry	19
Viennese Waltz	Nina Carberry	30	Lottie Ryan	28
Waltz				

==== Performances with Lottie Ryan ====
Week No.	Dance/Song	Judges' score			Total	Result
Week No.	Dance/Song	Redmond	Barry	Benson	Total	Result
1	Jive / "Whole Lotta Shakin' Goin' On"	7	7	7	21	No elimination
2	Contemporary Ballroom / "Castles"	8	8	9	25	Safe
3	Salsa / "Dora The Explorer Theme"	9	9	10	28	Safe
4	Tango / "Radio"	8	7	8	23	Safe
5	Charleston / "Woman Up"	8	8	9	25	No elimination
6	Viennese Waltz / "One of a Kind"	9	9	10	28	Safe
7	American Smooth / "Big Spender"	9	10	10	29	Bottom two
8	Samba / "Tip Toe"; Team Dance / "Sing, Sing, Sing (With a Swing)"	9; 9	10; 9	10; 9	29; 27	Safe
9	Paso Doble / "Theme from Mission: Impossible"; Rock-Til-You-Drop / "Happy Days"	9 Awarded	9; 5	10 points	28; 33	Bottom two
10	Quickstep / "It Don't Mean a Thing (If It Ain't Got That Swing)"; Cha-Cha-Cha (with Ryan McShane) / "Turn Me On"	10; 10	10; 10	10; 10	30; 30	Winners

==== Performances with Nina Carberry ====
Week No.	Dance/Song	Judges' score			Total	Result
Week No.	Dance/Song	Redmond	Barry	Gourounlian	Total	Result
1	Quickstep / "Black Horse and the Cherry Tree"	6	6	7	19	No elimination
2	Rumba / "Starlight"	8	8	9	25	Safe
3	Tango / "Elevation (Tomb Raider mix)"	6	6	7	19	Safe
4	Cha-cha-cha / "If the World Just Danced"	7	7	7	21	Safe
5	Salsa / "Starships"	8	8	8	24	No elimination
6	Viennese Waltz / "At Last"	10	10	10	30	Safe
7	Charleston / "Doop"	10	10	10	30	Safe
8	Jive / "Faith"	8	9	9	26	Safe
9	American Smooth / "A Foggy Day (in London Town)"; Team Dance / "Istanbul (Not Constantinople)"	9; 9	10; 10	10; 10	29; 29	Safe
10	Paso Doble / "Get Ready"; Bust-a-Move Marathon / "I'm So Excited"	10; Awarded	10; 4	10 points	30; 34	Safe
11	Viennese Waltz / "At Last"; Showdance / "If My Friends Could See Me Now"	10; 9	10; 10	10; 10	30; 29	Winners

=== Italy ===
On 3 September 2022, La Rocca announced via Instagram that he would be joining the Italian version of the show, Ballando con le Stelle for its seventeenth season as a professional dancer. He partnered journalist Luisella Costamagna. In the second week of the competition, Costamagna suffered a knee injury, this negatively affected the couple's performances forcing her to sit and move very little throughout most of them. This caused controversy, with many viewers questioning whether Costamagna and La Rocca should have remained in the competition when Costamagna was physically unable to dance. Judge Selvaggia Lucarelli was particularly vocal with her opinions, stating that she felt the couple should have bowed out gracefully and scored them 'zero' three weeks in a row. At the beginning of the sixth live show, Costamagna and La Rocca announced their decision to withdraw from the competition as Costamagna's injury had not healed sufficiently enough for her to continue. They were the third couple to leave the competition. Costamagna and La Rocca returned in the tenth week of the season to compete in the 'Repechage' - which saw five couples who had the competition return to dance again to win back a place in the following week's grand finale. Costamagna and La Rocca won the public vote and were, therefore, made finalists. On 23 December 2022, Costamagna and La Rocca were voted winners of the series, giving La Rocca his fourth consecutive win in a row - continuing his undefeated streak. On 23 December 2023, La Rocca won the eighteenth season of the show alongside Argentine showgirl Wanda Nara, securing his fifth consecutive victory across the Dancing with the Stars franchise. In 2024, he initially competed in the nineteenth season with singer Nina Zilli, though the couple were forced to withdraw from the competition after Zilli sustained an injury. Later in the season, he was paired with former Olympic swimmer Federica Pellegrini, with whom he finished in second place. In 2025, La Rocca took part in the spin-off Sognando... Ballando con le stelle, partnered with dancer Janiya Mami; however, he had to withdraw after the second episode due to health reasons (Mami went on to finish as runner-up with replacement partners). Later that year, he competed in the twentieth season of the main show alongside television presenter Barbara D'Urso, finishing in third place. In 2026, he returned for the twenty-first season, competing alongside actress Ornella Muti.

Series	Partner	Place
17	Luisella Costamagna	1st
18	Wanda Nara	1st
19	Nina Zilli	Withdrew
19	Federica Pellegrini	2nd
Spin-off	Janiya Mami	Withdrew
20	Barbara D'Urso	3rd
21	Ornella Muti	Participating

==== Performances with Luisella Costamagna ====
Week No.	Dance/Song	Judges' score					Bonus points	Total	Result
Week No.	Dance/Song	Zazzaroni	Canino	Smith	Lucarelli	Mariotto	Bonus points	Total	Result
1	Tango / "Beggin'"	8	8	9	7	10	-	42	No elimination
2	Modern / "Ricordati di me"	8	9	7	6	7	-	37	Safe
3	Waltz / "Il mondo"	5	6	2	0	0	-	13	No elimination
4	Bachata / "Killing Me Softly with His Song"	5	5	5	0	10	-	25	No elimination
5	Showdance / "All That Jazz"	9	10	10	0	10	25	64	Safe
6	No dance performed	-	-	-	-	-	-	-	Withdrew
7	Did not compete	-	-	-	-	-	-	-	N/A
8	Did not compete	-	-	-	-	-	-	-	N/A
9	Did not compete	-	-	-	-	-	-	-	N/A
10	Paso Doble / "Survivor"; Freestyle / "Trouble"	10; Won	10 majority	10 of	9 public	10 vote	30 -	79; 62%	Won Repechage
11	Argentine Tango / "Codigo de Barra"; Paso Doble / "Survivor"; Showdance / "All That Jazz"; Swing / "Trouble"; Bachata / "Killing Me Softly with His Song"; Waltz / "Il mondo"	10; Won; Finished; No; No; Winners	10 the in scores scores of	10 knockout the were were the	7 challenge top awarded awarded final	10 dance two here here vote	- - - - - -	47; 51% 35.7% - - 57%	Winners

==== Performances with Wanda Nara ====
Week No.	Dance/Song	Judges' score					Bonus points	Total	Result
Week No.	Dance/Song	Zazzaroni	Canino	Smith	Lucarelli	Mariotto	Bonus points	Total	Result
1	Rumba / "Caruso"	10	8	8	8	9	-	43	No elimination
2	Samba / "Magalenha"	10	10	10	10	10	-	50	Safe
3	Paso Doble / "Believer"	10	10	9	7	10	10	56	Safe
4	Waltz / "Unchained melody"	10	10	10	8	9	-	47	Safe
5	Salsa / "Despacito"	10	10	10	10	9	-	49	Safe
6	Charleston / "Do Your Thing"	10	10	10	10	10	8	58	Safe
7	Showdance / "I Put a Spell on You"	10	10	10	9	10	37	86	Safe
8	Bachata / "Déjà vu"	9	10	9	9	8	8	53	Safe
9	Modern / "La vita splendida"	10	10	10	10	10	35	85	Safe
10	Argentine Tango / "Por una cabeza/la cumparsita" Paso Doble / "Believer"; Samba / "Magalenha"; Salsa / "Despacito"; Charleston / "Do Your Thing"; Waltz / "Unchained melody" Paso Doble / "Believer"	10; No; Finished; No; No; No; Winners	10 scores in scores scores scores of	10 were the were were were the	10 awarded top awarded awarded awarded final	10 here two here here here vote	- - - - - - -	50 - 67% - - - 70%	Winners

==== Performances with Nina Zilli ====
Week No.	Dance	Judges' score					Bonus points	Total	Result
Week No.	Dance	Zazzaroni	Canino	Smith	Lucarelli	Mariotto	Bonus points	Total	Result
1	Quickstep	9	8	6	8	10	-	37	No elimination
2	Waltz	10	9	9	9	10	25	72	No elimination
3	Charleston	8	8	8	7	7	20	58	Safe
4	Slowfox	8	9	8	8	10	25	68	Safe
5	Freestyle	7	10	7	0	10	-	34	Safe
6	No dance performed	-	-	-	-	-	-	-	Withdrew
7	Did not compete	-	-	-	-	-	-	-	N/A
8	Did not compete	-	-	-	-	-	-	-	N/A
9	Did not compete	-	-	-	-	-	-	-	N/A
10	No dance performed	-	-	-	-	-	-	-	Withdrew
11	Did not compete	-	-	-	-	-	-	-	N/A
12	Did not compete	-	-	-	-	-	-	-	N/A

==== Performances with Federica Pellegrini ====
Week No.	Dance	Judges' score					Bonus points	Total	Result
Week No.	Dance	Zazzaroni	Canino	Smith	Lucarelli	Mariotto	Bonus points	Total	Result
10	Paso Doble	10	9	9	9	-	25	62	Safe
11	Modern	10	10	10	10	10	30	80	Safe
12	Quickstep; Argentine Tango; Modern; Salsa; Charleston; Slowfox; Paso Doble	10; Finished; Finished; No; No; No; 2nd	10 in in scores scores scores in	9 the the were were were the	10 top top awarded awarded awarded final	- three two here here here vote	- - - - - - -	50 - 75% - - - 39%	2nd

==== Performances with Janiya Mami ====
Week No.	Dance	Judges' score					Bonus points	Total	Result
Week No.	Dance	Zazzaroni	Canino	Smith	Lucarelli	Mariotto	Bonus points	Total	Result
1	Waltz	10	10	10	10	10	-	50	Safe
2	Boogie-woogie	10	10	10	0	0	5	35	Safe

==== Performances with Barbara D'Urso ====
Week No.	Dance	Judges' score					Bonus points	Total	Result
Week No.	Dance	Zazzaroni	Canino	Smith	Lucarelli	Mariotto	Bonus points	Total	Result
1	Rumba	9	8	8	7	7	-	39	No elimination
2	Tango	7	9	7	7	7	-	37	No elimination
3	Freestyle	10	9	9	9	10	-	47	No elimination
4	Quickstep	10	9	10	9	8	35	81	No elimination
5	Salsa	8	8	8	6	7	10	47	Safe
6	Waltz	9	10	10	9	9	-	47	Safe
7	Salsa Modern	- 9	- 10	- 10	- 9	- 9	10 -	57	Safe
8	Samba Bachata	8 -	9 -	8 -	7 -	6 -	50 10	88 25%	No elimination
9	- Slowfox	- 9	- 9	- 8	- 9	- 10	20 -	75	Safe
10	Paso Doble Freestyle	10 Finished	10 in	10 the	8 first	9 semifinal	10 -	57 56%	Safe
11	Waltz	8	9	9	6	8	-	40	Safe
12	Argentine Tango	10	10	10	8	9	30	77	Safe
13	Waltz Argentine Tango	10 3rd	10 in	10 the	8 final	9 vote	- -	47 35%	3rd

==== Performances with Ornella Muti ====
Week No.	Dance	Judges' score					Bonus points	Total	Result
Week No.	Dance	Zazzaroni	Matano	Smith	D'Urso	Mariotto	Bonus points	Total	Result
1	Tango	8	9	6	7	10	-	40	No elimination
2	Rumba	9	9	8	6	10	20	62	No elimination
3	Paso Doble	10	10	8	10	10	30	78	Safe
4	Waltz	10	10	8	7	10	50	95	Safe
5	Freestyle	10	10	8	8	10	-	46	Safe
6	Samba	6	6	3	5	10	-	30	Safe
7	Samba	9	9	8	9	10	-	45	Safe
8									
9									
10									
11									
12									

== Choreography ==
As a choreographer, La Rocca has worked on television productions including The Masked Dancer (ITV). He also collaborated on the 20th anniversary of Strictly Come Dancing, assisting Emmy Award-winning choreographer Mandy Moore on professional routines.
