= Happy Days (TV theme) =

Single by Pratt & McClain

from the album Pratt & McClain featuring "Happy Days"
- B-side: "Cruisin' with the Fonz"
- Released: March 1976
- Recorded: 1975
- Studio: ABC, Los Angeles, California
- Genre: Rock and roll, Doo-wop, theme song
- Length: 2:40
- Label: Reprise Records
- Songwriters: Charles Fox, Norman Gimbel
- Producers: Steve Barri, Michael Omartian

Pratt & McClain singles chronology
""Whachersign"" (1976)	"Happy Days" (1976)	"Devil with a Blue Dress" (1976)

"Happy Days" is a song written by Norman Gimbel and Charles Fox. It is the theme of the 1970s television series Happy Days. The song was written and performed in a style similar to 1950s rock and roll appropriate to the era depicted in the series, with male vocals singing doo-wop influenced harmonies, and can be heard during the TV show's opening and closing credits as it runs in perpetual rerun syndication.

"Happy Days" was first recorded in 1974 by Jim Haas with a group of other session singers for the first two seasons. These versions were used only during the closing credits of Seasons 1 and 2, with an updated take on "Rock Around the Clock" by Bill Haley and His Comets used as the opening theme. "Happy Days" was re-recorded by Pratt & McClain at ABC Recording Studios in Los Angeles in December 1975 with different lyrics for both the opening and closing credits for Seasons 3 through 10, with the duo including the song on their 1976 album Pratt & McClain featuring "Happy Days" and releasing it as a single. Bobby Arvon recorded an updated version in 1983 for Season 11, with the same lyrics as the version used for seasons 3-10.

Pratt & McClain's album version of the song peaked at No. 5 on the Billboard Hot 100, No. 7 on the Easy Listening chart, and No. 31 on the UK Singles Chart. In Canada, "Happy Days" reached No. 3.

Australian band Silver Studs did a rendition of the theme for their debut album. It became their biggest hit single in Australia, reaching No. 4 in June 1976.

In 2014, a re-recording of the song was used in commercials for Target. An instrumental version of the song plays in the background of some of the "Cooking with Sara" Flash games.

== Personnel ==
- Jerry McClain, Truett Pratt, and later Bobby Arvon (1983–84 TV only) – lead vocals
- Charles Fox, Michael Ormartian – keyboards

== Chart history ==
=== Weekly charts ===
Chart (1976)	Peak position
Australia (Kent Music Report)	20
Canada RPM Top Singles	3
UK	31
U.S. Billboard Hot 100	5
U.S. Billboard Adult Contemporary	7
U.S. Cash Box Top 100	6

=== Year-end charts ===
Chart (1976)	Rank
Canada	52
U.S. Cash Box	78

== Silver Studs version ==
Australian group Silver Studs released a version in 1976.

=== Weekly charts ===
Weekly chart performance for Silver Studs' version
Chart (1976)	Peak position
Australia (Kent Music Report)	5

=== Year-end charts ===
Year-end chart performance for Silver Studs' version
Chart (1976)	Position
Australia (Kent Music Report)	27

== See also ==
- List of 1970s one-hit wonders in the United States
