= Lottie Ryan =

Irish television and radio presenter

- Born: 15 October 1985 (age 40); Dublin, Ireland
- Occupation: Radio
- Agents: Noel Kelly; (until mid-2023)
- Known for: Broadcaster
- Style: Chatty
- Television: The Daily Show; Can’t Stop Dancing 2018
- Parent(s): Gerry Ryan; Morah Brennan

Lottie Ryan (born 15 October 1985) is an Irish television and radio presenter with RTÉ, Ireland's public service radio and television broadcaster.

She is a daughter of the broadcaster Gerry Ryan, and shared his agent, Noel Kelly, until she announced their separation shortly after his involvement in the RTÉ secret payment scandal was made public. She studied media and television in college for five years before moving to New York City where she worked for CBS on The Good Wife. Several radio stations, including Radio Nova 100FM, have requested her to go on air as a DJ.

She does the entertainment on RTÉ 2fm across weekdays and presented the national breakfast show Breakfast Republic in 2018 and 2019.

Ryan won the fourth season of the Irish edition of Dancing with the Stars in 2020.

She is a "brand ambassador" for Toyota, a deal arranged for her by her former agent, Noel Kelly of NK Management. In June 2023, she filmed a video in the RTÉ car park showing off a Toyota bZ4X, worth around €50,000. RTÉ reportedly reprimanded Ryan when it emerged in a newspaper report that she had used the Montrose campus to promote her brand.
