= Dancing with the Stars (Irish TV series) series 8 =

Irish tv show

Dancing with the Stars
- Series 8
- Presented by: Jennifer Zamparelli; Doireann Garrihy
- Judges: Arthur Gourounlian; Loraine Barry; Brian Redmond; Karen Byrne
- Celebrity winner: Rhys McClenaghan
- Professional winner: Laura Nolan
- No. of episodes: 11

Release
- Original network: RTÉ One
- Original release: 5 January – 16 March 2025

Series chronology
- ← Previous; Series 7 Next → Series 9

Dancing with the Stars returned for an eighth series on 5 January 2025 on RTÉ One.

On 30 August 2024, RTÉ confirmed that the show would return for an eighth series, with hosts Jennifer Zamparelli and Doireann Garrihy returning for their sixth and third seasons respectively.

On 8 December 2024 it was confirmed that two-time champion, Karen Byrne would join the judging panel for this series, bringing the panel from three to four for the first time ever. On 15 December the professional dancer line-up was confirmed. With Karen Byrne joining the judging panel, Kylee Vincent on maternity leave and Jillian Bromwich and Montel Hewson leaving to focus on their professional dancing careers, four new professional dancers; Alex Vladimirov, Daniela Roze, Maciej Zieba and Rebecca Scott, joined the show.

The final on 16 March 2025, was won by Rhys McClenaghan alongside partner Laura Nolan.

== Couples ==
On 9 December 2024, former Miss Universe Ireland, Aishah Akorede was announced as the first celebrity to take part. Celebrity reveals continued throughout the month until 15 December when Joanna Donnelly was revealed as the final celebrity taking part.

Celebrity	Known for	Professional	Status
Mickey Joe Harte	Singer-songwriter	Daniela Roze	Eliminated 1st on 19 January 2025
Elaine Crowley	Ireland AM presenter	Denys Samson	Eliminated 2nd on 26 January 2025
Joanna Donnelly	Meteorologist & weather presenter	Maciej Zieba	Eliminated 3rd on 9 February 2025
Yasmin Seky	Kin actress	Simone Arena	Eliminated 4th on 16 February 2025
Gearóid Farrelly	Stand-up comedian	Stephen Vincent	Eliminated 5th on 23 February 2025
Kevin Dundon	Chef	Rebecca Scott	Eliminated 6th on 2 March 2025
Aishah Akorede	Former Miss Universe Ireland	Robert Rowiński	Eliminated 7th on 9 March 2025
Danny O'Carroll	Mrs. Brown's Boys actor	Salome Chachua	Runners-up on 16 March 2025
Kayleigh Trappe	Social media personality	Ervinas Merfeldas	Runners-up on 16 March 2025
Jack Woolley	Taekwondo athlete	Alex Vladimirov	Runners-up on 16 March 2025
Rhys McClenaghan	Olympic artistic gymnast	Laura Nolan	Winners on 16 March 2025

== Scoring chart ==
Couple	Place	1	2	3	1+2+3	4	5	6	5+6	7	8	9	10	11
Rhys & Laura	1	31	32	30	93	29	33	39	72	31	39	39+39=78	40+5=45	40+40=80
Jack & Alex	2	30	32	33	95	23	38	35	73	40	37	35+35=70	40+4=44	40+40=80
Kayleigh & Ervinas	2	28	29	24	81	21	29	30	59	32	32	33+35=68	35+3=38	38+38=76
Danny & Salome	2	22	36	24	82	25	31	36	67	34	33	30+39=69	35+2=37	39+37=76
Aishah & Robert	5	29	27	30	86	24	31	30	61	33	36	32+39=71	35+1=36	
Kevin & Rebecca	6	17	13	18	48	8	22	25	47	20	24	21+35=56		
Gearóid & Stephen	7	28	28	30	86	22	28	31	59	32	33			
Yasmin & Simone	8	25	26	36	87	26	29	32	61	29				
Joanna & Maciej	9	15	23	19	57	17	24	23	47					
Elaine & Denys	10	23	23	20	66	18								
Mickey Joe & Daniela	11	19	14	28	61									

Red numbers indicate the couples with the lowest score for each week.
Green numbers indicate the couples with the highest score for each week.
the couple eliminated that week
the returning couple that was called forward and eventually last to be called safe, but was not necessarily in the bottom
the returning couple that finished in the bottom two and competed in the Dance-Off
the winning couple
the two/three runners-up
the couple was immune from elimination
"—" indicates the couple(s) did not dance that week

=== Average chart ===
This table only counts for dances scored on a traditional 40-points scale. It does not include the Team Dance or Marathon scores. Scores out of 30 were converted to the traditional 40-point scale.

Rank by average	Place	Couple	Total points	Number of dances	Total average
1	1	Rhys & Laura	432	12	36.0
2	2	Jack & Alex	431	12	35.9
3	2	Danny & Salome	390	12	32.5
4	5	Aishah & Robert	315	10	31.5
5	2	Kayleigh & Ervinas	376	12	31.3
6	8	Yasmin & Simone	212	7	30.3
7	7	Gearóid & Stephen	239	8	29.9
8	10	Elaine & Denys	90	4	22.5
9	9	Joanna & Maciej	127	6	21.2
10	11	Mickey Joe & Daniela	61	3	20.3
11	6	Kevin & Rebecca	171	9	19.0

== Highest and lowest scoring performances ==
The highest and lowest performances in each dance according to the judges' scale are as follows. Scores out of 30 were converted to the traditional 40-point scale.

Dance	Celebrity	Highest score	Celebrity	Lowest score
Tango	Kayleigh Trappe; Danny O'Carroll	35	Kevin Dundon	22
Cha-cha-cha	Jack Woolley; Aishah Akorede	32	Joanna Donnelly	15
Salsa	Jack Woolley	40	Elaine Crowley	20
Foxtrot	Aishah Akorede	35	Danny O'Carroll	22
Charleston	Rhys McClenaghan	40	Kevin Dundon	21
Waltz	Kevin Dundon	25	Elaine Crowley; Joanna Donnelly	23
Quickstep	Rhys McClenaghan	39	Kevin Dundon	18
Jive	Jack Woolley; Rhys McClenaghan	33	Kevin Dundon	11
Rumba	Kayleigh Trappe	33	Yasmin Seky	29
Paso Doble	Rhys McClenaghan	40	Mickey Joe Harte	19
American Smooth	Jack Woolley	40	Kevin Dundon	17
Contemporary Ballroom	Jack Woolley	40	Kayleigh Trappe	29
Samba	Jack Woolley	37	Kevin Dundon	13
Viennese Waltz	Danny O'Carroll	34	Kayleigh Trappe	29
Showdance	Jack Woolley; Rhys McClenaghan	40	Danny O'Carroll	37
Team Dance	Aishah Akorede; Danny O'Carroll; Rhys McClenaghan	39	Jack Woolley; Kayleigh Trappe; Kevin Dundon	35
Marathon	Rhys McClenaghan	5	Aishah Akorede	1

== Couples' highest and lowest scoring dances ==
Scores out of 20 were converted to the traditional 40-point scale.

Couple	Highest scoring dance	Lowest scoring dance
Rhys & Laura	Paso Doble, Charleston, & Showdance (40)	Cha-cha-cha (30)
Jack & Alex	Contemporary Ballroom, Salsa, American Smooth, & Showdance (40)	Viennese Waltz (30)
Danny & Salome	Charleston (39)	Foxtrot (22)
Kayleigh & Ervinas	Salsa & Showdance (38)	Cha-cha-cha (24)
Aishah & Robert	American Smooth (36)	Salsa (27)
Kevin & Rebecca	Waltz (25)	Jive (11)
Gearóid & Stephen	Charleston (33)	Tango, Cha-cha-cha & Paso Doble (28)
Yasmin & Simone	Charleston (36)	Samba (25)
Joanna & Maciej	Tango (24)	Cha-cha-cha (15)
Elaine & Denys	Jive (24)	Salsa (20)
Mickey Joe & Daniela	Foxtrot (28)	Jive (14)

== Weekly scores and songs ==
Unless indicated otherwise, individual judges scores in the charts below (given in parentheses) are listed in this order from left to right: Brian Redmond, Karen Byrne, Loraine Barry, Arthur Gourounlian.

=== Week 1 ===
Running order

Couple	Score	Dance	Music
Danny & Salome	22 (5, 6, 5, 6)	Foxtrot	"Obviously" – McFly
Yasmin & Simone	25 (6, 6, 6, 7)	Samba	"Oh Na Na" – Camila Cabello, Myke Towers & Tainy
Gearóid & Stephen	28 (6, 7, 8, 7)	Tango	"Training Season" – Dua Lipa
Jack & Alex	30 (7, 8, 7, 8)	Viennese Waltz	"Die with a Smile" – Lady Gaga & Bruno Mars
Joanna & Maciej	15 (3, 4, 4, 4)	Cha-cha-cha	"It's Raining Men" – The Weather Girls
Mickey Joe & Daniela	19 (5, 5, 5, 4)	Paso Doble	"Teenage Kicks" – The Undertones
Aishah & Robert	29 (7, 7, 7, 8)	Quickstep	"Stargazing" – Myles Smith
Kevin & Rebecca	17 (3, 5, 4, 5)	American Smooth	"Everybody Eats When They Come to My House" – John Lithgow
Kayleigh & Ervinas	28 (7, 7, 7, 7)	Jive	"Yes" – Merry Clayton
Elaine & Denys	23 (5, 6, 5, 7)	Waltz	"Three Times a Lady" – Commodores
Rhys & Laura	31 (7, 8, 8, 8)	Salsa	"Head & Heart" – Joel Corry feat. MNEK

=== Week 2 ===
Running order

Couple	Score	Dance	Music
Gearóid & Stephen	28 (6, 7, 7, 8)	Cha-cha-cha	"Disco Inferno" – The Trammps
Mickey Joe & Daniela	14 (3, 5, 3, 3)	Jive	"Mickey" – Toni Basil
Kayleigh & Ervinas	29 (7, 7, 7, 8)	Viennese Waltz	"Timeless" – Meghan Trainor
Kevin & Rebecca	13 (2, 4, 3, 4)	Samba	"Volare" – Gipsy Kings
Yasmin & Simone	26 (6, 7, 6, 7)	Foxtrot	"Birds of a Feather" – Billie Eilish
Rhys & Laura	32 (8, 8, 8, 8)	Tango	"Tanguera" – Sexteto Mayor
Joanna & Maciej	23 (5, 6, 6, 6)	Waltz	"Moon River" – Barbra Streisand
Elaine & Denys	23 (5, 6, 6, 6)	Paso Doble	"Standing in the Way of Control" – Gossip
Jack & Alex	32 (8, 8, 8, 8)	Cha-cha-cha	"Rush" – Troye Sivan
Aishah & Robert	27 (6, 7, 7, 7)	Salsa	"Deep Down" – Alok, Ella Eyre and Kenny Dope
Danny & Salome	36 (9, 9, 9, 9)	Charleston	"Don't Blame it On Me" – Michael Bublé

=== Week 3 ===
Running order

Couple	Score	Dance	Music	Result
Kayleigh & Ervinas	24 (6, 6, 6, 6)	Cha-cha-cha	"Espresso" – Sabrina Carpenter	Safe
Kevin & Rebecca	18 (4, 5, 4, 5)	Quickstep	"Soda Pop" – Robbie Williams feat. Michael Bublé	Last to be called safe
Aishah & Robert	30 (7, 8, 7, 8)	Tango	"I Like the Way You Kiss Me" – Artemas	Safe
Rhys & Laura	30 (7, 8, 7, 8)	Cha-cha-cha	"Treasure" – Bruno Mars	Safe
Joanna & Maciej	19 (4, 5, 5, 5)	Samba	"Gimme Hope Jo'anna" – DJ Jazzy D The GrooveMaster	Safe
Danny & Salome	24 (5, 7, 6, 6)	Jive	"C'mon Everybody" – Eddie Cochran	Last to be called safe
Gearóid & Stephen	30 (7, 8, 7, 8)	Viennese Waltz	"Everybody Hurts" – R.E.M.	Safe
Elaine & Denys	20 (5, 5, 5, 5)	Salsa	"Turn the Beat Around" – Gloria Estefan and Miami Sound Machine	Safe
Yasmin & Simone	36 (9, 9, 9, 9)	Charleston	"Been Like This" – Meghan Trainor and T-Pain	Safe
Mickey Joe & Daniela	28 (7, 7, 7, 7)	Foxtrot	"Too Sweet" – Hozier	Eliminated
Jack & Alex	33 (8, 8, 8, 9)	Jive	"Stay" – The Kid LAROI feat. Justin Bieber	Safe

=== Week 4: Movie Week ===
Individual judges scores in the chart below (given in parentheses) are listed in this order from left to right: Brian Redmond, Karen Byrne, Arthur Gourounlian.

Due to a family bereavement, head judge Loraine did not appear on this weeks show. This means that the total score was out of 30 instead of 40.

Running order

Couple	Score	Dance	Music	Movie	Result
Aishah & Robert	24 (8, 8, 8)	Cha-cha-cha	"Rescue Me" – Fontella Bass	Sister Act	Safe
Gearóid & Stephen	22 (7, 7, 8)	American Smooth	"Consider Yourself" – Max Bygraves	Oliver!	Last to be called safe
Kayleigh & Ervinas	21 (7, 7, 7)	Quickstep	"The Aristocats" – The Mike Sammes Singers	The Aristocats	Safe
Jack & Alex	23 (7, 8, 8)	Tango	"The Joker" – Lady Gaga	Joker: Folie à Deux	Last to be called safe
Joanna & Maciej	17 (5, 6, 6)	Quickstep	"Mrs. Robinson" – Simon & Garfunkel	The Graduate	Safe
Elaine & Denys	18 (6, 6, 6)	Jive	"You Can't Stop the Beat" – Hairspray cast	Hairspray	Eliminated
Danny & Salome	25 (8, 8, 9)	Paso Doble	"Now We Are Free (Remix) – Gabry Ponte, Blasterjaxx, 1 World & AntoNetta	Gladiator	Safe
Yasmin & Simone	26 (8, 9, 9)	Contemporary Ballroom	"How Far I'll Go" – Auliʻi Cravalho	Moana	Safe
Kevin & Rebecca	8 (2, 3, 3)	Jive	"I'm a Believer" – Smash Mouth	Shrek	Safe
Rhys & Laura	29 (9, 10, 10)	Charleston	"Spider-Man" – Shaun Johnson Big Band Experience	Spider-Man	Safe

=== Week 5: Dedicated Dance Week ===
Running order

Couple	Score	Dance	Music	Dedication	Result
Rhys & Laura	33 (8, 8, 8, 9)	Jive	"Gold Dust" – DJ Fresh	His coach, Luke Carson	Safe
Joanna & Maciej	24 (6, 6, 6, 6)	Tango	"Dreams" – The Cranberries	A couple she helped through her charity, 'Pomegranate'	Safe
Yasmin & Simone	29 (7, 7, 7, 8)	Rumba	"Halo" – Beyoncé	Her former youth service workers	Safe
Kevin & Rebecca	22 (5, 6, 5, 6)	Tango	"Let's Dance" – David Bowie	His wife, Catherine	Safe
Aishah & Robert	31 (8, 7, 8, 8)	Samba	"Kese (Dance)" – Wizkid	Her mother, Kemi	Safe
Gearóid & Stephen	28 (6, 7, 8, 7)	Paso Doble	"Holding Out for a Hero" – Bonnie Tyler	His parents, Eamon & Deirdre	Safe
Kayleigh & Ervinas	29 (7, 7, 8, 7)	Contemporary Ballroom	"Brave" – Sara Bareilles	Her niece, Fíadh	Safe
Jack & Alex	38 (9, 10, 9, 10)	American Smooth	"Grace" – The Wolfe Tones	His friend, Kellie Harrington	Granted immunity
Danny & Salome	31 (7, 8, 8, 8)	Cha-cha-cha	"She's a Lady" – Tom Jones	His father, Brendan	Safe

=== Week 6: Eurovision Week ===
Running order

Couple	Score	Dance	Music	Eurovision	Result
Joanna & Maciej	23 (5, 6, 6, 6)	Jive	"Waterloo" – ABBA	1st place, Sweden - 1974	Eliminated
Danny & Salome	36 (9, 9, 9, 9)	Contemporary Ballroom	"Arcade" – Duncan Laurence	1st place, The Netherlands - 2019	Safe
Jack & Alex	35 (8, 9, 9, 9)	Paso Doble	"Cha Cha Cha" – Käärijä	2nd place, Finland - 2023	Immune
Kayleigh & Ervinas	30 (7, 7, 8, 8)	Samba	"Fuego" – Eleni Foureira	2nd place, Cyprus - 2018	Safe
Gearóid & Stephen	31 (7, 8, 8, 8)	Contemporary Ballroom	"In Your Eyes" – Niamh Kavanagh	1st place, Ireland - 1993	Safe
Yasmin & Simone	32 (7, 8, 8, 9)	Salsa	"Qélé, Qélé" – Sirusho	4th place, Armenia - 2008	Last to be called safe
Rhys & Laura	39 (9, 10, 10, 10)	Quickstep	"Fairytale" – Alexander Rybak	1st place, Norway - 2009	Safe
Kevin & Rebecca	25 (6, 6, 7, 6)	Waltz	"Amar pelos dois" – Salvador Sobral	1st place, Portugal - 2017	Safe
Aishah & Robert	30 (7, 8, 8, 7)	Charleston	"Ooh Aah... Just a Little Bit" – Gina G	8th place, United Kingdom - 1996	Bottom two

Judges' votes to save

- Gourounlian: Aishah & Robert
- Byrne: Aishah & Robert
- Redmond: Aishah & Robert
- Barry: Did not vote, but would have voted for Aishah & Robert

=== Week 7: Love Week ===
Running order

Couple	Score	Dance	Music	Result
Kevin & Rebecca	20 (5, 5, 5, 5)	Paso Doble	"You Give Love a Bad Name" – Bon Jovi	Last to be called safe
Rhys & Laura	31 (7, 8, 8, 8)	Rumba	"Love Me like You Do" – Ellie Goulding	Safe
Yasmin & Simone	29 (7, 7, 7, 8)	Jive	"Tainted Love" – Imelda May	Eliminated
Danny & Salome	34 (8, 8, 9, 9)	Viennese Waltz	"This Year's Love" – David Gray	Safe
Aishah & Robert	33 (8, 8, 8, 9)	Paso Doble	"We Found Love" – Rihanna feat. Calvin Harris	Bottom two
Jack & Alex	40 (10, 10, 10, 10)	Contemporary Ballroom	"You've Got The Love" – Florence and the Machine	Safe
Gearóid & Stephen	32 (8, 8, 8, 8)	Quickstep	"You Can't Hurry Love" – Phil Collins	Safe
Kayleigh & Ervinas	32 (8, 8, 8, 8)	Salsa	"Let There Be Love" – Christina Aguilera	Safe

Judges' votes to save

- Gourounlian: Aishah & Robert
- Byrne: Aishah & Robert
- Redmond: Aishah & Robert
- Barry: Did not vote, but would have voted for Aishah & Robert

=== Week 8: Orchestra Night ===
Running order

Couple	Score	Dance	Music	Result
Kayleigh & Ervinas	32 (8, 8, 8, 8)	Charleston	"That's Entertainment" – Lady Gaga	Safe
Danny & Salome	33 (8, 8, 8, 9)	Salsa	"All Night Long (All Night)" – Lionel Richie	Bottom two
Kevin & Rebecca	24 (6, 6, 6, 6)	Foxtrot	"Livin' Thing" – Electric Light Orchestra	Safe
Jack & Alex	37 (9, 9, 9, 10)	Samba	"The Cup of Life" – Ricky Martin	Safe
Aishah & Robert	36 (8, 9, 9, 10)	American Smooth	"A Thousand Miles" – Vanessa Carlton	Last to be called safe
Rhys & Laura	39 (9, 10, 10, 10)	Contemporary Ballroom	"Bittersweet Symphony" – The Verve	Safe
Gearóid & Stephen	33 (8, 8, 9, 8)	Charleston	"Crazy in Love" – Emeli Sandé and The Bryan Ferry Orchestra	Eliminated

Judges' votes to save

- Gourounlian: Danny & Salome
- Byrne: Danny & Salome
- Redmond: Danny & Salome
- Barry: Did not vote, but would have voted for Danny & Salome

=== Week 9: Country Week ===
Running order

Couple	Score	Dance	Music	Result
Jack & Alex	35 (8, 9, 9, 9)	Quickstep	"Austin (Boots Stop Workin')" – Dasha	Safe
Kayleigh & Ervinas	33 (8, 8, 8, 9)	Rumba	"I Will Always Love You" – Dolly Parton	Safe
Kevin & Rebecca	21 (5, 5, 5, 6)	Charleston	"Rompin' Stompin'" – Scooter Lee	Eliminated
Rhys & Laura	39 (9, 10, 10, 10)	American Smooth	"Wagon Wheel" – Nathan Carter	Safe
Aishah & Robert	32 (8, 8, 8, 8)	Jive	"Hang Tight Honey" – Lainey Wilson	Bottom two
Danny & Salome	30 (7, 8, 7, 8)	Quickstep	"Ring of Fire" – Johnny Cash	Safe
Jack & Alex; Kayleigh & Ervinas; Kevin & Rebecca	35 (8, 9, 9, 9)	Freestyle ("Footloose")	"Footloose" – Kenny Loggins	
Aishah & Robert; Danny & Salome; Rhys & Laura	39 (9, 10, 10, 10)	Freestyle ("Timber")	"Timber" – Pitbull feat. Kesha	

Judges' votes to save

- Gourounlian: Aishah & Robert
- Byrne: Aishah & Robert
- Redmond: Aishah & Robert
- Barry: Did not vote, but would have voted for Aishah & Robert

=== Week 10: Fright Night (Semi-Final) ===
Guest act:

Running order

Couple	Score	Dance	Music	Theme	Result
Aishah & Robert	35 (8, 9, 9, 9)	Foxtrot	"Black Magic" – Little Mix	Witchcraft	Eliminated
Kayleigh & Ervinas	35 (8, 9, 9, 9)	Tango	"Hot to Go!" – Chappell Roan	Devils	Safe
Rhys & Laura	40 (10, 10, 10, 10)	Paso Doble	"O Fortuna" – Hidden Citizens	Vampire	Safe
Danny & Salome	35 (9, 9, 8, 9)	Tango	"Poison" – Alice Cooper	Snakes	Safe
Jack & Alex	40 (10, 10, 10, 10)	Salsa	"Red Alert" – Basement Jaxx	Aliens	Bottom two
Rhys & Laura; Jack & Alex; Kayleigh & Ervinas; Danny & Salome; Aishah & Robert	5; 4; 3; 2; 1	Scare-a-thon	"Time Warp" – Tenacious D	Rocky Horror	

Judges' votes to save

- Gourounlian: Jack & Alex
- Byrne: Jack & Alex
- Redmond: Jack & Alex
- Barry: Did not vote, but would have voted for Jack & Alex

=== Week 11: The Final ===
Running order

Couple	Score	Dance	Music	Result
Danny & Salome	39 (10, 10, 9, 10)	Charleston	"Don't Blame it On Me" – Michael Bublé	Runners-Up
Danny & Salome	37 (9, 10, 9, 9)	Showdance	"Rock This Party (Everybody Dance Now)" – Bob Sinclar and Cutee B feat. Dollarman, Big Ali & Makedah	Runners-Up
Jack & Alex	40 (10, 10, 10, 10)	American Smooth	"Grace" – The Wolfe Tones	Runners-Up
Jack & Alex	40 (10, 10, 10, 10)	Showdance	"The Edge of Glory" – Years & Years	Runners-Up
Kayleigh & Ervinas	38 (9, 10, 9, 10)	Salsa	"Let There Be Love" – Christina Aguilera	Runners-Up
Kayleigh & Ervinas	38 (9, 10, 9, 10)	Showdance	"Wildest Dreams (R3hab remix)" – Taylor Swift	Runners-Up
Rhys & Laura	40 (10, 10, 10, 10)	Charleston	"Spider-Man" – Shaun Johnson Big Band Experience	Winners
Rhys & Laura	40 (10, 10, 10, 10)	Showdance	"Beautiful Things" – Benson Boone	Winners

== Dance chart ==
Highest scoring dance
Lowest scoring dance
No dance performed
Not performed due to illness or injury
Immune from elimination

Couple	1	2	3	4	5	6	7	8	9		10		11	
Rhys & Laura	Salsa	Tango	Cha-cha-cha	Charleston	Jive	Quickstep	Rumba	Contemporary Ballroom	American Smooth	Freestyle (Timber)	Paso Doble	Scare-a-thon	Charleston	Showdance
Jack & Alex	Viennese Waltz	Cha-cha-cha	Jive	Tango	American Smooth	Paso Doble	Contemporary Ballroom	Samba	Quickstep	Freestyle (Footloose)	Salsa	Scare-a-thon	American Smooth	Showdance
Kayleigh & Ervinas	Jive	Viennese Waltz	Cha-cha-cha	Quickstep	Contemporary Ballroom	Samba	Salsa	Charleston	Rumba	Freestyle (Footloose)	Tango	Scare-a-thon	Salsa	Showdance
Danny & Salome	Foxtrot	Charleston	Jive	Paso Doble	Cha-cha-cha	Contemporary Ballroom	Viennese Waltz	Salsa	Quickstep	Freestyle (Timber)	Tango	Scare-a-thon	Charleston	Showdance
Aishah & Robert	Quickstep	Salsa	Tango	Cha-cha-cha	Samba	Charleston	Paso Doble	American Smooth	Jive	Freestyle (Timber)	Foxtrot	Scare-a-thon		
Kevin & Rebecca	American Smooth	Samba	Quickstep	Jive	Tango	Waltz	Paso Doble	Foxtrot	Charleston	Freestyle (Footloose)				
Gearóid & Stephen	Tango	Cha-cha-cha	Viennese Waltz	American Smooth	Paso Doble	Contemporary Ballroom	Quickstep	Charleston						
Yasmin & Simone	Samba	Foxtrot	Charleston	Contemporary Ballroom	Rumba	Salsa	Jive							
Joanna & Maciej	Cha-cha-cha	Waltz	Samba	Quickstep	Tango	Jive								
Elaine & Denys	Waltz	Paso Doble	Salsa	Jive										
Mickey Joe & Daniela	Paso Doble	Jive	Foxtrot											
