= Simone Arena =

Italian dancer and choreographer

- Born: 7 August 1993 (age 33); Catania, Italy
- Occupations: Dancer; Choreographer
- Known for: Dancing with the Stars Belgium; Ballando con le Stelle
- Height: 1.80 m (5 ft 11 in)

Simone Arena (born 7 August 1992) is an Italian dancer and choreographer. Best known as former Italian Ballroom and Latin Champion, Arena joined the third series of the Belgian version of Dancing with the Stars.

== Early life ==
Arena was born in Catania, Italy. He has been dancing since the age of seven.

== Amateur dancing career ==
By the age of sixteen Arena became the Vice Italian Latin Champion.

He briefly partnered Maria Laureante for a short time in 2007. After that partnership dissolved her teamed up with Federica Zapulla. They enjoyed some success, finishing inside the top ten in the IDSF Open which took place in Maribor, Slovenia on 16 December 2007.

Between 2009 and 2010, Arena partnered Malene Meihlen. Their most successful outing came in an IDSF International Open which took place in Aarhus, Denmark on 28 November 2009. He also teamed up with Slovakian dancer, Linda Manduchova for a time.

He later partnered with fellow Italian dancer, Alessia Vernuccio. Their best result was a top three finish in the WDSF Open which took place in Ancona on 7 October 2012.

== Professional dancing career ==
Arena joined in 2014 the Broadway production of Burn the Floor touring in London's West End and around the world including China, Australia and Japan. 2023 marked Arena's tenth consecutive year as part of the group.

In 2019, Arena was announced as part of the cast of Somnium: A Dancer's Dream with Strictly Come Dancing stars, Katya Jones and Neil Jones.

In 2020, Arena was announced to join the cast of Giovanni Pernice's 'This is Me' tour, however the tour was postponed due to the COVID-19 pandemic.

== Dancing with the Stars ==
=== Belgium ===
In December 2021, Arena joined the cast of the third series of the second incarnation (eighth overall) of the Belgian version of Dancing with the Stars. He was partnered with artistic gymnast, Nina Derwael. On 12 February 2022, Derwael and Arena won the series.

Series	Partner	Place
8	Nina Derwael	1st

==== Performances with Nina Derwael ====
Week No.	Dance/Song	Judges' score				Bonus points	Total	Result
Week No.	Dance/Song	Vanlessen	Leunis	Anane	Kooijman	Bonus points	Total	Result
1	Argentine Tango / "No Time to Die"	8	8	8	8	–	32	No elimination
2	Jive / "My Sharona"	8	7	8	7	–	30	Safe
3	Freestyle / "The Greatest"	8	8	8	9	–	33	Safe
4	Cha-cha-cha / "Move Your Feet; Jive Marathon / "Good 4 U"	9 Awarded	9; 12	9 extra	9 points	– –	36; 48	Safe
5	Rumba / "Easy on Me"	9	8	9	9	–	35	Safe
6	Rumba / "Wicked Game"; Disco Marathon / "Rasputin"	9 Awarded	9; 8	9 extra	8 points	5 –	38; 46	No elimination Switch-Up Week with Nora Gharib
7	Viennese Waltz / "It's a Man's Man's Man's World"; Modern / "Hurts" (with Jan Vanlessen)	10 –	10; 10	10; 10	10; 9	– –	40; 29	Safe
8	Paso Doble / "Let's Get It Started"; Samba / "Magalenha"; Freestyle / "Fly Me to the Moon"	9; 10; No	9; 10 scores	9; 10 were	9; 10 awarded	– – –	36; 40 –	Winners

=== Italy ===
Arena joined the Italian version of the show, Ballando con le Stelle for its seventeenth season as a professional dancer. He partnered TV presenter, Marta Flavi. The couple were the first to be eliminated from the competition. After the season ended, Arena spoke about his dissatisfaction with the overall production of the Italian version, stating he would not return for future editions.

Series	Partner	Place
17	Marta Flavi	13th

==== Performances with Marta Flavi ====
Week No.	Dance/Song	Judges' score					Bonus points	Total	Result
Week No.	Dance/Song	Zazzaroni	Canino	Smith	Lucarelli	Mariotto	Bonus points	Total	Result
1	Tango / "Ancora ancora ancora"	6	7	6	5	5	–	29	No elimination
2	Boogie woogie / "Ohi Marie"; Playoff dance - Salsa / "Cercami"	5 Losers	5 of	2 the	4 public	0 vote	– –	16; 40.6%	Eliminated

=== Ireland ===
On 28 November 2023, Arena was announced as one of the new professional dancers of the seventh series of the Irish version of Dancing with the Stars. He was partnered with RuPaul's Drag Race winner, Blu Hydrangea. They reached the final, finishing as joint runners-up to Jason Smyth & Karen Byrne. They broke the record of receiving the most perfect scores in a series, with 5. The previous record of 4 was held by Denise McCormack and Nina Carberry. They also received the most 10s (along with Carberry), with 18.

Arena returned for the eighth series in 2025, where he was partnered with Kin actress, Yasmin Seky. They were the fourth couple to be eliminated from the show after losing their dance off to Aishah Akorede & Robert Rowiński.

On 23 November 2025, Arena announced that he was leaving the show.

Series	Partner	Place
7	Blu Hydrangea	2nd
8	Yasmin Seky	8th

==== Performances with Blu Hydrangea ====
Week No.	Dance/Song	Judges' score			Total	Result
Week No.	Dance/Song	Redmond	Barry	Gourounlian	Total	Result
1	Cha-cha-cha / "You're Free"	8	8	8	24	No elimination
2	American Smooth / "True Blue"	6	7	7	20	No elimination
3	Tango / "Applause"	8	8	9	25	Safe
4	Salsa / "Dance the Night"	8	8	9	25	Safe
5	Contemporary Ballroom / "Tattoo"	8	8	9	25	Safe
6	Paso Doble / "Sissy That Walk"	7	8	9	24	No elimination
7	Viennese Waltz / "Lose Control"	9	10	10	29	Safe
8	Samba / "I Go to Rio"	10	10	10	30	Safe
9	Quickstep / "Texas Hold 'Em"; Team Dance / "Electric Energy"	10; 10	10; 9	10; 9	30; 28	Bottom two
10	Charleston / "Witch Doctor"; Scare-a-thon / "Dead Ringer for Love"	10; Awarded	10; 5	10 points	30; 35	Safe
11	Contemporary Ballroom / "Tattoo"; Showdance / "I Am What I Am"	10; 10	10; 10	10; 10	30; 30	Runners-up

==== Performances with Yasmin Seky ====
Week No.	Dance/Song	Judges' score				Total	Result
Week No.	Dance/Song	Redmond	Byrne	Barry	Gourounlian	Total	Result
1	Samba / "Oh Na Na"	6	6	6	7	25	No elimination
2	Foxtrot / "Birds of a Feather"	6	7	6	7	26	No elimination
3	Charleston / "Been Like This"	9	9	9	9	36	Safe
4	Contemporary Ballroom / "How Far I'll Go"	8	9	-	9	26	Safe
5	Rumba / "Halo"	7	7	7	8	29	Safe
6	Salsa / "Qélé, Qélé"	7	8	8	9	32	Safe
7	Jive / "Tainted Love"	7	7	7	8	29	Eliminated

== Personal life ==
Arena is in a relationship with former Strictly Come Dancing professional dancer, Michelle Tsiakkas.
