= Dancing with the Stars (Irish TV series) series 7 =

Irish tv show

Dancing with the Stars
- Series 7
- Presented by: Jennifer Zamparelli; Doireann Garrihy
- Judges: Arthur Gourounlian; Loraine Barry; Brian Redmond
- Celebrity winner: Jason Smyth
- Professional winner: Karen Byrne

Release
- Original network: RTÉ One
- Original release: 7 January – 17 March 2024

Series chronology
- ← Previous; Series 6 Next → Series 8

Dancing with the Stars returned for a seventh series on 7 January 2024 on RTÉ One.

On 29 August 2023, RTÉ confirmed that the show would return for a seventh season with hosts, Jennifer Zamparelli and Doireann Garrihy returning for their fifth and second seasons, respectively.

On 5 September 2023, professional dancer, and reigning champion, Emily Barker announced her departure from the show. On 31 October 2023, Maurizio Benenato confirmed that he, too, would not return having left the show two weeks into the previous season for personal reasons. On 12 November 2023, after six seasons, John Nolan became the third professional dancer to announce their decision to leave the programme. On 17 October 2023, it was reported that Irish dancers, Jillian Bromwich and Montel Hewson would join the professional line-up. On 28 November 2023, the professional line-up was confirmed with Bromwich and Hewson officially announced as joining the cast alongside former Dancing with the Stars Belgium champion professional dancer, Simone Arena. The announcement also confirmed that Michael Danilczuk and Hannah Kelly would not return to the cast.

The final on 17 March 2024, was won by Jason Smyth alongside partner Karen Byrne.

== Couples ==
On 1 December 2023, the first five celebrities taking part, Blu Hydrangea, David Whelan, Eileen Dunne, Miriam Mullins and Rosanna Davison, were revealed by Patrick Kielty on The Late Late Show. The remaining six celebrities were announced throughout the following week.

Celebrity	Known for	Professional	Status
Rory Cowan	Former Mrs. Brown’s Boys actor	Jillian Bromwich	Eliminated 1st on 21 January 2024
Miriam Mullins	Social media personality	Montel Hewson	Eliminated 2nd on 28 January 2024
Shane Quigley Murphy	Fair City actor	Laura Nolan	Eliminated 3rd on 4 February 2024
Eileen Dunne	Former RTÉ News presenter	Robert Rowiński	Eliminated 4th on 18 February 2024
Rosanna Davison	Author & Miss World 2003	Stephen Vincent	Eliminated 5th on 25 February 2024
Katja Mia	The Six O'Clock Show presenter	Ervinas Merfeldas	Eliminated 6th on 3 March 2024
Davy Russell	Former jockey	Kylee Vincent; Laura Nolan (Week 2)	Eliminated 7th on 10 March 2024
Blu Hydrangea	RuPaul's Drag Race: UK vs the World winner	Simone Arena	Runners-up on 17 March 2024
David Whelan	Wild Youth singer	Salome Chachua	Runners-up on 17 March 2024
Laura Fox	RTÉ 2fm & Ireland's Fittest Family presenter	Denys Samson	Runners-up on 17 March 2024
Jason Smyth	Former Paralympic sprint runner	Karen Byrne; Juliia Vasylenko (Week 2)	Winners on 17 March 2024

== Scoring chart ==
Couple	Place	1	2	3	1+2+3	4	5	6	7	6+7	8	9	10	11
Jason & Karen	1	17	17	24	58	18	18	20	23	43	21	23+29=52	27+2=29	28+30=58
Laura & Denys	2	21	22	23	66	22	27	25	24	49	27	30+29=59	26+4=30	30+30=60
David & Salome	2	23	24	24	71	27	24	28	26	54	28	28+29=57	30+3=33	30+30=60
Blu & Simone	2	24	20	25	69	25	25	24	29	53	30	30+28=58	30+5=35	30+30=60
Davy & Kylee	5	19	15	12	46	21	20	26	23	49	23	21+28=49	27+1=28	
Katja & Ervinas	6	21	22	24	67	23	23	26	27	53	26	28+28=56		
Rosanna & Stephen	7	17	23	20	60	24	26	26	22	48	22			
Eileen & Robert	8	14	13	17	44	17	17	17	19	38				
Shane & Laura	9	19	20	24	63	21	19							
Miriam & Montel	10	18	21	20	59	20								
Rory & Jillian	11	11	14	13	38									

Red numbers indicate the couples with the lowest score for each week.
Green numbers indicate the couples with the highest score for each week.
the couple eliminated that week
the returning couple that was called forward and eventually last to be called safe, but was not necessarily in the bottom
the returning couple that finished in the bottom two and competed in the Dance-Off
the winning couple
the two/three runners-up
the couple was immune from elimination
"—" indicates the couple(s) did not dance that week

=== Average chart ===
This table only counts for dances scored on a traditional 30-points scale. It does not include the Team Dance or Marathon scores.

Rank by average	Place	Couple	Total points	Number of dances	Total average
1	2	Blu & Simone	322	12	26.8
1	2	David & Salome	322	12	26.8
3	2	Laura & Denys	307	12	25.6
4	6	Katja & Ervinas	220	9	24.4
5	7	Rosanna & Stephen	180	8	22.5
6	1	Jason & Karen	266	12	22.2
7	5	Davy & Kylee	207	10	20.7
8	9	Shane & Laura	103	5	20.6
9	10	Miriam & Montel	79	4	19.8
10	8	Eileen & Robert	114	7	16.3
11	11	Rory & Jillian	38	3	12.7

== Highest and lowest scoring performances ==
The highest and lowest performances in each dance according to the judges' scale are as follows.

Dance	Celebrity	Highest score	Celebrity	Lowest score
Tango	Jason Smyth; Laura Fox	27	Eileen Dunne	17
Cha-cha-cha	Blu Hydrangea; Katja Mia; David Whelan; Laura Fox	24	Eileen Dunne	13
Salsa	David Whelan	30	Rory Cowan	13
Foxtrot	Katja Mia	22	Eileen Dunne; Jason Smyth	17
Charleston	Laura Fox; Blu Hydrangea	30	Rory Cowan	11
Waltz	Jason Smyth	21	Eileen Dunne; Rosanna Davison	17
Quickstep	Blu Hydrangea	30	Davy Russell	15
Jive	Laura Fox; David Whelan	30	Eileen Dunne	17
Rumba	David Whelan	28	Jason Smyth	18
Paso Doble	David Whelan	28	Jason Smyth	17
American Smooth	Katja Mia; Laura Fox	26	Eileen Dunne	14
Contemporary Ballroom	Blu Hydrangea	30	Laura Fox	22
Samba	Blu Hydrangea	30	Davy Russell	12
Viennese Waltz	Blu Hydrangea	29	Rory Cowan	14
Showdance	Laura Fox; Jason Smyth; David Whelan; Blu Hydrangea	30		
Team Dance	David Whelan; Jason Smyth; Laura Fox	29	Blu Hydrangea; Davy Russell; Katja Mia	28
Marathon	Blu Hydrangea	5	Davy Russell	1

== Couples' highest and lowest scoring dances ==
Couple	Highest scoring dance	Lowest scoring dance
Jason & Karen	Showdance (30)	Foxtrot & Paso Doble (17)
Blu & Simone	Samba, Quickstep, Charleston, Contemporary Ballroom & Showdance (30)	American Smooth (20)
David & Salome	Salsa, Jive & Showdance (30)	Tango (23)
Laura & Denys	Charleston, Jive & Showdance (30)	Jive (21)
Davy & Kylee	Viennese Waltz (27)	Samba (12)
Katja & Ervinas	Salsa (28)	Samba (21)
Rosanna & Stephen	Charleston & Rumba (26)	Waltz (17)
Eileen & Robert	Paso Doble (19)	Cha-Cha-Cha (13)
Shane & Laura	Jive (24)	Salsa & Rumba (19)
Miriam & Montel	Samba (21)	Quickstep (18)
Rory & Jillian	Viennese Waltz (14)	Charleston (11)

== Weekly scores and songs ==
Unless indicated otherwise, individual judges scores in the charts below (given in parentheses) are listed in this order from left to right: Brian Redmond, Loraine Barry, Arthur Gourounlian.

=== Week 1 ===
Running order

Couple	Score	Dance	Music
Katja & Ervinas	21 (6, 7, 8)	Samba	"My Love" – Leigh-Anne feat. Ayra Starr
Davy & Kylee	19 (6, 6, 7)	Paso Doble	"Crazy Horses" – The Osmonds
Laura & Denys	21 (7, 7, 7)	Jive	"River Deep – Mountain High" – Glee cast
Shane & Laura	19 (6, 6, 7)	Salsa	"Where Did You Go?" – Jax Jones feat. MNEK
Eileen & Robert	14 (4, 5, 5)	American Smooth	"I'm a Woman" – Peggy Lee
Jason & Karen	17 (5, 6, 6)	Foxtrot	"They Can't Take That Away from Me" – Frank Sinatra & Natalie Cole
Blu & Simone	24 (8, 8, 8)	Cha-cha-cha	"You're Free" – Icona Pop x Ultra Naté
Rosanna & Stephen	17 (6, 5, 6)	Waltz	"Come Away with Me" – Norah Jones
David & Salome	23 (7, 7, 9)	Tango	"Bad Habits" – Ed Sheeran feat. Bring Me the Horizon
Miriam & Montel	18 (6, 6, 6)	Quickstep	"Fascination" – Alphabeat
Rory & Jillian	11 (3, 4, 4)	Charleston	"When I'm Sixty-Four" – Jive Bunny and the Mastermixers

=== Week 2 ===
Running order

Couple	Score	Dance	Music
Rosanna & Stephen	23 (7, 8, 8)	Salsa	"Hips Don't Lie" – Shakira feat. Wyclef Jean
Miriam & Montel	21 (7, 7, 7)	Samba	"Calm Down" – Rema feat. Selena Gomez
Shane & Laura	20 (6, 7, 7)	Waltz	"At This Moment" – Michael Bublé
Rory & Jillian	14 (4, 5, 5)	Viennese Waltz	"That's Amore" – Dean Martin
Laura & Denys	22 (7, 7, 8)	Contemporary Ballroom	"Cruel Summer" – Taylor Swift
Katja & Ervinas	22 (7, 7, 8)	Foxtrot	"Killer Queen" – Queen
Jason & Juliia*	17 (5, 6, 6)	Paso Doble	"Run to You" – Bryan Adams
Blu & Simone	20 (6, 7, 7)	American Smooth	"True Blue" – Madonna
Davy & Laura*	15 (5, 5, 5)	Quickstep	"Giddy Up!" – Shania Twain
Eileen & Robert	13 (5, 4, 4)	Cha-cha-cha	"Let's Get Loud" – Jennifer Lopez
David & Salome	24 (8, 8, 8)	Charleston	"Bad Boy Good Man" – Tape Five

*Pro dancers Karen Byrne and Kylee Vincent did not perform due to illnesses. Instead, Jason Smyth danced with Juliia Vasylenko and Davy Russell danced with Laura Nolan respectively.

=== Week 3 ===
Running order

Couple	Score	Dance	Music	Result
Laura & Denys	23 (7, 8, 8)	Paso Doble	"Don't Let Me Be Misunderstood" – Santa Esmeralda	Safe
Davy & Kylee	12 (4, 4, 4)	Samba	"Iko Iko (My Bestie)" – Justin Wellington feat. Small Jam	Last to be called safe
David & Salome	24 (8, 8, 8)	Viennese Waltz	"Good" – John Legend	Safe
Rory & Jillian	13 (3, 5, 5)	Salsa	"Macarena" – Los del Río	Eliminated
Rosanna & Stephen	20 (6, 7, 7)	Quickstep	"Things" – Robbie Williams & Jane Horrocks	Safe
Eileen & Robert	17 (5, 6, 6)	Waltz	"Try to Remember" – Liza Minnelli	Safe
Katja & Ervinas	24 (8, 8, 8)	Cha-cha-cha	"Cuff It" – Beyoncé	Safe
Miriam & Montel	20 (7, 6, 7)	Foxtrot	"Heaven" – Niall Horan	Last to be called safe
Shane & Laura	24 (8, 8, 8)	Jive	"All These Nights" – Tom Grennan	Safe
Blu & Simone	25 (8, 8, 9)	Tango	"Applause" – Lady Gaga	Safe
Jason & Karen	24 (8, 8, 8)	Contemporary Ballroom	"Show Me What I'm Looking For" – Carolina Liar	Safe

=== Week 4: Movie Week ===
Running order

Couple	Score	Dance	Music	Movie	Result
Shane & Laura	21 (7, 7, 7)	Quickstep	"Mr. Blue Sky" – Electric Light Orchestra	The Super Mario Bros. Movie	Last to be called safe
Jason & Karen	18 (6, 6, 6)	Rumba	"With These Hands" – Tom Jones	Edward Scissorhands	Safe
Rosanna & Stephen	24 (8, 8, 8)	Contemporary Ballroom	"Just Like Fire" – Pink	Alice Through the Looking Glass	Safe
Eileen & Robert	17 (5, 6, 6)	Tango	"Super Trouper" – Cher	Mamma Mia! Here We Go Again	Safe
David & Salome	27 (9, 9, 9)	Jive	"You Never Can Tell"/"Misirlou" – Chuck Berry/Dick Dale	Pulp Fiction	Safe
Katja & Ervinas	23 (7, 8, 8)	Paso Doble	"Queen of the Night" – Whitney Houston	The Bodyguard	Safe
Davy & Kylee	21 (7, 7, 7)	Charleston	"Star Wars Theme/Cantina Band" – Meco	Star Wars	Safe
Miriam & Montel	20 (6, 7, 7)	Cha-cha-cha	"Can't Stop the Feeling!" – Justin Timberlake	Trolls	Eliminated
Laura & Denys	22 (7, 7, 8)	Viennese Waltz	"Somewhere Over The Rainbow" – Lea Michele	The Wizard of Oz	Last to be called safe
Blu & Simone	25 (8, 8, 9)	Salsa	"Dance the Night" – Dua Lipa	Barbie	Safe

=== Week 5 ===
Running order

Couple	Score	Dance	Music	Result
Davy & Kylee	20 (6, 7, 7)	American Smooth	"Ain't Misbehaving" – Rod Stewart	Safe
Laura & Denys	27 (9, 9, 9)	Samba	"Échame La Culpa" – Luis Fonsi & Demi Lovato	Safe
David & Salome	24 (8, 8, 8)	Cha-cha-cha	"Lil Boo Thang" – Paul Russell	Last to be called safe
Shane & Laura	19 (6, 6, 7)	Rumba	"How Will I Know?" – Sam Smith	Eliminated
Eileen & Robert	17 (5, 6, 6)	Jive	"Let's Twist Again" – Chubby Checker	Last to be called safe
Rosanna & Stephen	26 (8, 9, 9)	Charleston	"Dr. Wanna Do" – Caro Emerald	Safe
Blu & Simone	25 (8, 8, 9)	Contemporary Ballroom	"Tattoo" – Loreen	Safe
Jason & Karen	18 (6, 6, 6)	Salsa	"Don't Stop Dancing" – Olly Murs	Safe
Katja & Ervinas	23 (7, 8, 8)	Viennese Waltz	"Keep Holding On" – Avril Lavigne	Safe

=== Week 6: Dedicated Dance Week ===
There was no elimination in Week 6. The judges still scored and the public still voted. However, in a twist, the couple who received the highest combined points was immune from the following week's first Dance-Off, therefore securing their place in the competition until Week 8. The couple granted immunity was Davy & Kylee.

Running order

Couple	Score	Dance	Music	Dedication	Result
Blu & Simone	24 (7, 8, 9)	Paso Doble	"Sissy That Walk" – RuPaul	Their mentor, RuPaul	Safe
Jason & Karen	20 (6, 7, 7)	Viennese Waltz	"Daughters" – John Mayer	His daughters, Evie & Lottie	Safe
Katja & Ervinas	26 (8, 9, 9)	Tango	"Sisters Are Doing It for Themselves" – Eurythmics feat. Aretha Franklin	Her sisters, Andrea & Fiona	Safe
David & Salome	28 (9, 10, 9)	Rumba	"Fields of Gold" – Sting	His father, Jim	Safe
Davy & Kylee	26 (8, 9, 9)	Contemporary Ballroom	"Roar" – Katy Perry	His wife, Edelle	Granted Immunity
Eileen & Robert	17 (5, 6, 6)	Foxtrot	"Proud Mary" – Creedence Clearwater Revival	Her friend and former colleague, Mary Kennedy	Safe
Laura & Denys	25 (8, 8, 9)	Quickstep	"Galway Girl" – Sharon Shannon feat. Mundy	Her grandmother, Nora	Safe
Rosanna & Stephen	26 (8, 9, 9)	Rumba	"Lady in Red" – Chris de Burgh	Her father, Chris de Burgh	Safe

=== Week 7 ===
Running order

Couple	Score	Dance	Music	Result
Eileen & Robert	19 (6, 6, 7)	Paso Doble	"Viva Torero" – A La Carte	Eliminated
David & Salome	26 (8, 9, 9)	Quickstep	"Almost Like Being in Love" – Bradley Walsh	Safe
Rosanna & Stephen	22 (7, 7, 8)	Tango	"Together in Electric Dreams" – Giorgio Moroder & Philip Oakey	Bottom two
Jason & Karen	23 (8, 8, 7)	Samba	"Rhythm Divine" – Enrique Iglesias	Safe
Davy & Kylee	23 (8, 7, 8)	Tango	"Whatever Lola Wants (Gotan Project remix) – Sarah Vaughan	Immune
Laura & Denys	24 (8, 8, 8)	Cha-cha-cha	"yes, and?" – Ariana Grande	Last to be called safe
Blu & Simone	29 (9, 10, 10)	Viennese Waltz	"Lose Control" – Teddy Swims	Safe
Katja & Ervinas	27 (9, 9, 9)	Charleston	"I Need You" – Jon Batiste	Safe

Dance-Off

Judges' votes to save

- Gourounlian: Rosanna & Stephen
- Redmond: Rosanna & Stephen
- Barry: Did not vote, but would have voted to save Rosanna & Stephen

=== Week 8: Orchestra Night ===
Running order

Couple	Score	Dance	Music	Result
Katja & Ervinas	26 (8, 9, 9)	American Smooth	"Everlasting Love" – Love Affair	Bottom two
Laura & Denys	27 (9, 9, 9)	Tango	"Take On Me" – A-ha	Safe
Davy & Kylee	23 (7, 8, 8)	Jive	"Everybody Needs Somebody to Love" – The Blues Brothers	Safe
Blu & Simone	30 (10, 10, 10)	Samba	"I Go to Rio" – Hugh Jackman	Safe
Jason & Karen	21 (7, 7, 7)	Waltz	"Watermark" – Enya	Last to be called safe
Rosanna & Stephen	22 (7, 7, 8)	Paso Doble	"Toreador Song" – Georges Bizet	Eliminated
David & Salome	28 (9, 9, 10)	Contemporary Ballroom	"Paradise" – Coldplay	Safe

Dance-Off

Judges' votes to save

- Gourounlian: Katja & Ervinas
- Redmond: Katja & Ervinas
- Barry: Did not vote, but would have voted to save Katja & Ervinas

=== Week 9: Team Dance Week ===
Running order

Couple	Score	Dance	Music	Result
Jason & Karen	23 (7, 8, 8)	Jive	"Runaway" – OneRepublic	Safe
Laura & Denys	30 (10, 10, 10)	Charleston	"Do Your Thing" – Basement Jaxx	Safe
Blu & Simone	30 (10, 10, 10)	Quickstep	"Texas Hold 'Em" – Beyoncé	Bottom two
Davy & Kylee	21 (7, 7, 7)	Cha-cha-cha	"Spicy Margarita" – Jason Derulo & Michael Bublé	Safe
David & Salome	28 (9, 9, 10)	Paso Doble	"Whole Lotta Love" – Led Zeppelin	Safe
Katja & Ervinas	28 (9, 9, 10)	Salsa	"Levitating" – Mandinga	Eliminated
David & Salome; Jason & Karen; Laura & Denys (Team Captain: Jennifer Zamparelli with Robert)	29 (9, 10, 10)	Freestyle ("Jen's Party Animals")	"A Little Party Never Killed Nobody (All We Got)" – Fergie, Q-Tip and GoonRock	
Blu & Simone; Davy & Kylee; Katja & Ervinas (Team Captain: Doireann Garrihy with Montel)	28 (10, 9, 9)	Freestyle ("Doireann's Dancing Divas")	"Electric Energy" – Ariana DeBose, Boy George and Nile Rodgers	

Dance-Off

Judges' votes to save

- Gourounlian: Blu & Simone
- Redmond: Blu & Simone
- Barry: Did not vote, but would have voted to save Blu & Simone

=== Week 10: Fright Night (Semi-Final) ===
Guest act: Brooke performing her single, 'Love Bomb'.

Running order

Couple	Score	Dance	Music	Theme	Result
David & Salome	30 (10, 10, 10)	Salsa	"Wrapped Up" – Olly Murs	Mummy	Bottom two
Laura & Denys	26 (8, 9, 9)	American Smooth	"Monster Mash" – Bobby Pickett	Frankenstein	Safe
Jason & Karen	27 (9, 9, 9)	Tango	"Disturbia" – Rihanna	Clown	Safe
Davy & Kylee	27 (9, 9, 9)	Viennese Waltz	"Never Tear Us Apart" – INXS	Skeleton	Eliminated
Blu & Simone	30 (10, 10, 10)	Charleston	"Witch Doctor" – The Cartoons	Witch	Safe
Blu & Simone; Laura & Denys; David & Salome; Jason & Karen; Davy & Kylee	5; 4; 3; 2; 1	Scare-a-thon	"Dead Ringer for Love" – Meat Loaf feat. Cher	Monsters	

Dance-Off

Judges' votes to save

- Gourounlian: David & Salome
- Redmond: David & Salome
- Barry: Did not vote, but would have voted to save David & Salome

=== Week 11: The Final ===
Guest act: Riverdance with The DWTS All-Stars including: Marty Morrissey, Bernard O'Shea, Cliona Hagan, Brian Dowling, Ryan Andrews, Lottie Ryan & Ellen Keane.

Running order

Couple	Score	Dance	Music	Result
Laura & Denys	30 (10, 10, 10)	Jive	"River Deep – Mountain High" – Glee cast	Runners-up
Laura & Denys	30 (10, 10, 10)	Showdance	"Make It Look Easy" – DITA	Runners-up
Jason & Karen	28 (9, 10, 9)	Samba	"Rhythm Divine" – Enrique Iglesias	Winners
Jason & Karen	30 (10, 10, 10)	Showdance	"Go the Distance" – Michael Bolton	Winners
David & Salome	30 (10, 10, 10)	Jive	"You Never Can Tell/Misirlou" – Chuck Berry & Dick Dale	Runners-up
David & Salome	30 (10, 10, 10)	Showdance	"All That Really Matters" – Illenium & Teddy Swims	Runners-up
Blu & Simone	30 (10, 10, 10)	Contemporary Ballroom	"Tattoo" – Loreen	Runners-up
Blu & Simone	30 (10, 10, 10)	Showdance	"I Am What I Am" – John Barrowman	Runners-up

== Dance chart ==
Highest scoring dance
Lowest scoring dance
No dance performed
Not performed due to illness or injury
Immune from elimination

Couple	1	2	3	4	5	6	7	8	9		10		11	
Jason & Karen	Foxtrot	Paso Doble	Contemporary Ballroom	Rumba	Salsa	Viennese Waltz	Samba	Waltz	Jive	Freestyle (Jen's Party Animals)	Tango	Scareathon	Samba	Showdance
Laura & Denys	Jive	Contemporary Ballroom	Paso Doble	Viennese Waltz	Samba	Quickstep	Cha-cha-cha	Tango	Charleston	Freestyle (Jen's Party Animals)	American Smooth	Scareathon	Jive	Showdance
David & Salome	Tango	Charleston	Viennese Waltz	Jive	Cha-cha-cha	Rumba	Quickstep	Contemporary Ballroom	Paso Doble	Freestyle (Jen's Party Animals)	Salsa	Scareathon	Jive	Showdance
Blu & Simone	Cha-cha-cha	American Smooth	Tango	Salsa	Contemporary Ballroom	Paso Doble	Viennese Waltz	Samba	Quickstep	Freestyle (Doireann's Dancing Divas)	Charleston	Scareathon	Contemporary Ballroom	Showdance
Davy & Kylee	Paso Doble	Quickstep	Samba	Charleston	American Smooth	Contemporary Ballroom	Tango	Jive	Cha-cha-cha	Freestyle (Doireann's Dancing Divas)	Viennese Waltz	Scareathon		
Katja & Ervinas	Samba	Foxtrot	Cha-cha-cha	Paso Doble	Viennese Waltz	Tango	Charleston	American Smooth	Salsa	Freestyle (Doireann's Dancing Divas)				
Rosanna & Stephen	Waltz	Salsa	Quickstep	Contemporary Ballroom	Charleston	Rumba	Tango	Paso Doble						
Eileen & Robert	American Smooth	Cha-cha-cha	Waltz	Tango	Jive	Foxtrot	Paso Doble							
Shane & Laura	Salsa	Waltz	Jive	Quickstep	Rumba									
Miriam & Montel	Quickstep	Samba	Foxtrot	Cha-cha-cha										
Rory & Jillian	Charleston	Viennese Waltz	Salsa											
