= Adam Best =

Adam Best may refer to:

- Adam Best (actor) (born 1983), actor from Northern Ireland
- Adam Best (EastEnders), a character from the BBC soap opera EastEnders
- Adam Best (businessman) (born 1978), American entrepreneur and film producer
