= Michelle Tsiakkas =

Cypriot Sri-Lankan dancer

- Born: 29 August 1995 (age 31); Cyprus
- Occupations: Ballroom dancer, Latin dancer, choreographer
- Known for: Burn the Floor; Strictly Come Dancing
- Partner: Simone Arena

Michelle Tsiakkas (born 29 August 1995) is a Cypriot professional ballroom and Latin dancer, who appeared as a professional on the BBC television dance show Strictly Come Dancing between 2022 and 2025.

== Early and personal life ==
Tsiakkas was born in Cyprus on 29 August 1995. She is of Sri Lankan heritage. She first started dancing at the age of six in her home country and has reached Latin dance champion status, having won national titles consecutively between 2001 and 2011 before moving to London to study.

Tsiakkas is in a relationship with Simone Arena, a professional dancer on the Belgian, Italian and Irish versions of Dancing with the Stars.

== Career ==
Tsiakkas has appeared in the live dance show Burn the Floor alongside fellow Strictly professionals Dianne Buswell, Graziano Di Prima, Johannes Radebe and Jowita Przystał.

=== Strictly Come Dancing ===
In July 2022, it was announced that Tsiakkas was joining the twentieth series of Strictly Come Dancing as a professional dancer, alongside Vito Coppola, Carlos Gu, and Lauren Oakley. Tsiakkas received her first partner, EastEnders actor Jamie Borthwick, in the twenty-second series. They were eliminated in Week 10. She did not receive a partner for the twenty-third series, however danced with Brian McFadden in the 2025 Christmas Special. In March 2026, it was announced that Tsiakkas had been axed from the show along with several other professional dancers. Speaking on the decision not to renew her contract, Tsiakkas said her "dream was shattered" and that she was "grieving for her job".

Series	Partner	Place	Average Score
22	Jamie Borthwick	7th	31.7

==== Series 22 ====
Celebrity partner: Jamie Borthwick

Week No.	Dance/Song	Judges' score (Note: Individual judges' scores are listed in the following order: Craig Revel Horwood, Motsi Mabuse, Shirley Ballas, Anton Du Beke.)				Total	Result
1	Viennese waltz / "Beautiful Things"	6	6	5	6	23	No Elimination
2	Rumba / "Ain't No Sunshine"	6	7	7	7	27	Safe
3	Quickstep / "I'm Still Standing"	8	8	7	7	30	Safe
4	Salsa / "Danza Kuduro"	8	9	9	8	34	Safe
5	Paso doble / "Malagueña"	9	10	10	10	39	Safe
6	American Smooth / "The Addams Family Theme"	9	10	10	9	38	Safe
7	Samba / "Faith"	7	8	8	8	31	Safe
8	Argentine tango / "Do I Wanna Know?"	7	8	7	8	30	Safe
9	Jive / "The Ketchup Song (Aserejé)"	8	8	8	9	33	Safe
10	Foxtrot / “Stand By Me”	8	8	7	9	34 (Note: The couple was awarded two additional points for their dance to "Samba (Conga)" and "La Vida Es Un Carnaval" in the Samba-thon.)	Eliminated

- Green numbers indicates when Jamie and Michelle were at the top of the leaderboard.
- Red numbers indicates when Jamie and Michelle were at the bottom of the leaderboard.

==== Strictly Come Dancing Christmas Special ====
Tsiakkas danced with Brian McFadden for the 2025 Strictly Come Dancing Christmas Special.

=== Dance tours ===
In November 2025, Tsiakkas announced she was to appear at "Dancing With The Stars Weekends" 2026.

=== Saga Cruises ===
Tsiakkas, together with former Strictly professional, Vincent Simone, and Dancing with the Stars professionals Victoria Martin and Simone Arena began a new dance venture with Saga Cruises in 2026. Beginning on 6 December 2026 they would be performing an Eras "dance spectacular" as well as Tsiakkas providing salsa classes.

== Other activities ==
After her departure from Strictly Come Dancing, in 2026 Tsiakkas joined the mental health charity, SANE, as an ambassador.
