= YFA =

YFA may refer to:

- Yemen Football Association, the governing body of football in Yemen
- Young Film Academy, an English educational institution
- Fort Albany Airport (IATA code)
- Youth Fire Association - see Junior firefighter
