= Garryvoe =

Civil parish in County Cork, Ireland

Coordinates: 51.8595°N 8.0033°W

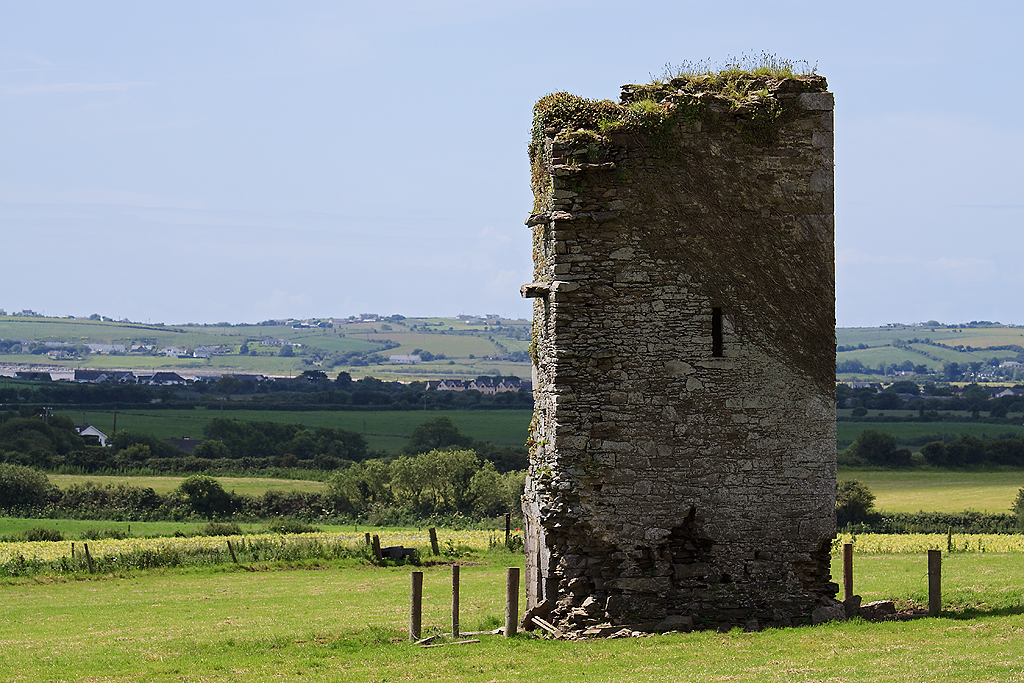
Garryvoe Castle tower house

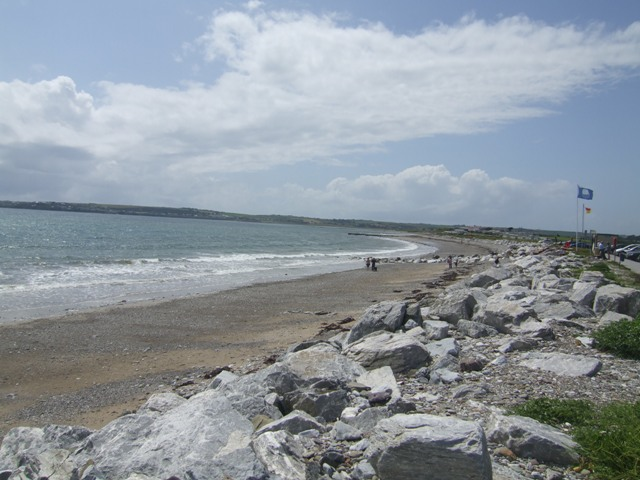
Beach at Garryvoe

Garryvoe (Irish: Garraí Bhoithe) is a civil parish in the historical barony of Imokilly in County Cork, Ireland. The civil parish is centred on a small settlement, also referred to as Garryvoe, which lies on the R632 regional road between Ladysbridge, and Shanagarry and fronts onto Garryvoe Beach.

Evidence of ancient settlement in the area includes a number of ringfort, fulacht fiadh and enclosure sites in the townlands of Garryvoe Lower, Garryvoe Upper and Ballybutler. Garryvoe Castle, a ruined tower house in the townland of Garryvoe Lower, is sometimes associated with the Anglo-Norman Carew family. A ruined medieval church and graveyard is located nearby.

While previously classified as a Blue Flag beach, as of 2020 the beach at Garryvoe was classified as an "identified bathing water" area of "sufficient" quality.

The TikTok personality and radio presenter, Miriam Mullins, is from the area.
