= Murder Most Puzzling =

British television series

- Genre: Cosy; Mystery; Crime
- Created by: Dominique Moloney
- Based on: The Puzzle Lady series by Parnell Hall
- Directed by: Tom Dalton
- Starring: Phyllis Logan; Charlotte Hope; Adam Best; Alistair Brammer; Richard Croxton; Nick Danan; Jack Weise; Simon Haines; Amber Mendez-Martin; Conor Sánchez; Yasmin Seky
- Country of origin: United Kingdom
- Original language: English
- No. of series: 1
- No. of episodes: 6

Production
- Executive producers: Todd Berger; Jennifer Chen; Julie Di Cresce; Robert Franke; Patrick Irwin; Daniel Mekinda; Dominique Moloney
- Producers: Emily Dalton; Tom Dalton; Brett Wilson
- Running time: 120 minutes
- Production companies: Paramount; ZDF; 5 Channel Zero; PBS

Original release
- Network: 5
- Release: 19 June 2025 – present

Murder Most Puzzling is a 2025 crime mystery television series starring Phyllis Logan and Charlotte Hope, which premiered on 19 June 2025 on 5. It was released on the PBS network on February 26, 2026, under the title The Puzzle Lady.

== Premise ==
Eccentric celebrity cruciverbalist Cora Felton (aka The Puzzle Lady) and her niece Sherry have moved to the sleepy English town of Bakerbury to escape from a mysterious pursuer from their past. But when a teenage girl is found dead with a crossword clue on her chest, the local police call on The Puzzle Lady to help solve the crime.

== Cast ==
=== Main ===
- Phyllis Logan as Cora Felton (The Puzzle Lady)
- Charlotte Hope as Sherry Carter
- Adam Best as DCI Derek Hooper
- Richard Croxford as Mayor Firth
- Alistair Brammer as Anton Grant
- Nick Danan as DS Sam Brody
- Jack Weise as PC Danny Finley
- Simon Haines as Rod Reed
- Trevor Kaneswaran as Sunil Baidwan
- Amber Mendez-Martin as Katy Hooper
- Conor Sánchez as Jimmi Potter
- Yasmin Seky as Becky Baidwan

=== Guest ===
- Julie Michelo as Ellen Hooper
- Kevin McNally as Gilbert Sullivan
- Ashionye Michelle Raccah as Babs Dufresne
- Fiona Browne as Edith Potter
- Catherine Rees as Dr Nadia Burke
- Conor Grimes as Mr Trotter
- David Crowley as Stuart Tanner
- Ben Waddell as Gary Gibson
- Amy Morgan as Sioned
- Ben Freeman as Dennis Pride
- Chris Patrick-Simpson as Ray Hendrie
- Tabitha Smythe as Stacey Gallivan
- Jacob Baird as Julian Hendrix
- Maggie Hayes as Ally Brindle
- Sarah Alexander as Gloria Hendrix
- Amanda Doherty as Olivia Lemon
- Matthew Sharpe as Darren Duggan
- Aidan McArdle as Governor Peacock
- Louise Parker as Vicki Tanner
- Declan O’Connor as Dante

== Production ==
The six-part series is written and created by Dominique Moloney, based on the best-selling Puzzle Lady series of novels by Parnell Hall. Phyllis Logan was announced in the lead role in October 2024. Filming took place in Northern Ireland in late 2024.

== Episodes ==
No. overall	No. in series	Title	Directed by	Written by	Original release date
1	1	"Episode 1"	Tom Dalton	Dominique Moloney	19 June 2025
2	2	"Episode 2"	Tom Dalton	Dominique Moloney	26 June 2025
3	3	"Episode 3"	Tom Dalton	Dominique Moloney	3 July 2025
4	4	"Episode 4"	Tom Dalton	Dominique Moloney	12 March 2026
5	5	"Episode 5"	Tom Dalton	Dominique Moloney	19 March 2026
6	6	"Episode 6"	Tom Dalton	Dominique Moloney	26 March 2026

== Broadcast ==
It premiered as The Puzzle Lady in Belgium on BBC First on 17 March 2026. It started showing as The Puzzle Lady in the Netherlands on BBC NL on 26 May 2026.

== Reception ==
Philip Cunnington in the Lancashire Post wrote: "This uneasy mix of the cosy and the corrupt ... finds it hard to sustain interest over its two-hour running time".
