= Yasmin Seky =

Irish actress (born 1998)

- Born: 6 July 1998 (age 27); Cabra, Dublin, Ireland
- Occupation: Actress
- Television: Kin

Yasmin Seky (born 6 July 1998) is an Irish actress. She is best known for her role as Nikita Murphy in the RTÉ One drama series Kin.

== Early life ==
Seky was born in the Dublin suburb of Cabra, to a Ghanaian father and Irish mother. She is the eldest of four children. She has spoken about how her father discouraged her from acting to find a "good, steady job".

== Career ==
Seky rose to prominence in 2021 following her supporting role in the drama series, Kin. Despite never acting professionally before, Seky was contacted on Facebook by casting director, Louise Kiely, to audition for the role. Seky had auditioned for Kiely ten years previously in which she was cast as the character 'T' in the short film 'Messers' by Colin Thornton. In April 2022, Seky received the 'Best Newcomer' award at the Irish RTS Awards for her breakout performance in the show.

In January 2025, she took part in Dancing with the Stars partnering Simone Arena. They were eliminated in the seventh week of the show.

== Personal life ==
Outside of acting, Seky has maintained a career in banking.

== Filmography ==
Year	Film/Television	Role	Notes
2011	Messers	T	Short film
2021–2023	Kin	Nikita Murphy	TV series
2025	Dancing with the Stars	Contestant	TV series
2025	Murder Most Puzzling	Becky Baidwan	TV series
