= Beauty and the Geek (British TV series) =

British reality television series

- Genre: Reality
- Created by: Ashton Kutcher
- Presented by: Matt Edmondson (2022); Mollie King (2022)
- Starring: Alex Purves (2006)
- Narrated by: David Mitchell (2006)
- Country of origin: United Kingdom
- Original language: English
- No. of series: 2
- No. of episodes: 14

Production
- Running time: 60 minutes (inc. adverts)
- Production companies: September Films (2006); Initial (2022)

Original release
- Network: E4 (2006); Discovery+ (2022)
- Release: 7 February 2006 – present

Related
- Beauty and the Geek

Beauty and the Geek is a British reality television show that first aired on E4 from 7 February to 14 March 2006. A second series premiered exclusively on the Discovery+ streaming service on 25 September 2022.

== Overview ==
Beauty and the Geek was first aired in the United Kingdom on E4 on 7 February 2006, following the success of the format in the United States, and was advertised similarly as "the Ultimate Social Experiment".

Like its US counterpart, the show matches physically attractive, but intellectually challenged women with geeky-looking, socially inept, "genius" men, and have them try to learn from each other. The women try to learn about academia such as rocket science or anatomy from the men, while the men try to learn social skills from the women. Each pair must share a room (for some this meant sleeping in the same bed) in a large Scottish castle (Blairquhan Castle in Ayrshire) that provides the setting for the show for the first series.

== Series 1 (2006) ==
The first series premiered on 7 February 2006 and ended on 14 March 2006 on E4, before being repeated on Channel 4 beginning on 31 March 2006. In the first series there is no host per se, although voiceovers are provided by David Mitchell of Peep Show fame and the physical actions normally requiring a host are performed by a silent "butler" known as "Gates" (actor Alex Purves).

The show began with seven female "beauties" and seven male "geeks". The men and women took turns choosing partners by introducing themselves in gender-divided rooms. Once paired off, the teams worked together to become proficient in unfamiliar areas of study. Their skills are tested in a series of competitions, usually one for the men and one for the women - the winners of which get to choose one team each to go to an elimination round. In the elimination room, the team members face three questions each on their respective areas of study and the team with the most points (or the winner of the tiebreaker in the event of a tie) remains in the competition, with the other team leaving immediately. The last team remaining wins £40,000 to share.

=== Teams ===
Teams		Status
The Beauties	The Geeks	Status
Teri Marquez (Page 3 Girl)	John Gethin (Theologian/Philosopher)	Winner
Sam Wyness (Essex Girl)	Edmund Bolton (Former Child Prodigy)	Runner-up
Alex Slater (Boxing Ring Beauty)	Will Goodhand (Young Conservative)	Eliminated in episode 5
Elissa Friday (Model/Aspiring Actress)	Ben Jewell (Wildlife Fundraiser)	Eliminated in episode 4
Natalie Pike (High Street Honey)	Jamie Sawyer (Mathmo)	Eliminated in episode 3
Hayley Dixon (Podium Dancer)	David Booth (Evolutionary Biologist)	Eliminated in episode 2
Carrie Watson (Booty Dancer)	Philip Scott (Computer Scientist)	Eliminated in episode 1

=== Challenges and eliminations ===
Episode	Beauty challenge (winner)	Geek challenge (winner)	Up for Elimination	Eliminated
1	Spelling Bee (Natalie)	Dancing Competition (Ben)	Hayley & David; Carrie & Phillip	Carrie & Philip
2	Human Body (Natalie)	Massage (Will)	Hayley & David; Elissa & Ben	Hayley & David
3	Rocket Science (Elissa)	Women's Fashion (John)	Natalie & Jamie; Sam & Edmund	Natalie & Jamie
4 (Note: This episode featured two challenges, which were judged as a combined effort - the winning team got to select both of the bottom two.)	Get Drinks Bought (Alex)	Acquire Phone Numbers (Will)	Elissa & Ben; Teri & John	Elissa & Ben
5 (Note: This episode featured one challenge, which was judged as a combined effort - the winning team was safe, leaving the other two teams up for elimination.)	Outdoor Challenge (Sam & Edmund)		Alex & Will; Teri & John	Alex & Will
6	How much do you know about your Partner? (Teri & John) (Note: There was no challenge in the final episode - the winner was determined by the outcome of the final quiz.)			

=== Episode progress ===
#	Contestants	Episodes					
#	Contestants	1	2	3	4	5	6
1	Teri	SAFE	SAFE	SAFE	RISK	RISK	WINNER
1	John	SAFE	SAFE	WIN	RISK	RISK	WINNER
2	Sam	SAFE	SAFE	RISK	SAFE	WIN	RUNNER-UP
2	Edmund	SAFE	SAFE	RISK	SAFE	WIN	RUNNER-UP
3	Alex	SAFE	SAFE	SAFE	WIN	OUT	
3	Will	SAFE	WIN	SAFE	WIN	OUT	
4	Elissa	SAFE	RISK	WIN	OUT		
4	Ben	WIN	RISK	SAFE	OUT		
5	Natalie	WIN	WIN	OUT			
5	Jamie	SAFE	SAFE	OUT			
6	Hayley	RISK	OUT				
6	David	RISK	OUT				
7	Carrie	OUT					
7	Philip	OUT					

The contestants won the competition.
The contestant won the challenge and their pair was safe from elimination.
The contestant's partner won the challenge and they were safe from elimination.
The contestant did not win the challenge but their pair was safe from elimination.
The contestant and their partner survived elimination.
The contestant and their partner was eliminated.

== Series 2 (2022) ==
In 2022, following the success of the rebooted Australian version, streaming service Discovery+ commissioned a new eight-episode British version of the show with Matt Edmondson and Mollie King as hosts. The show was ordered from production company Initial (part of the Banijay group) and was commissioned by Discovery alongside another British dating show called Zodiac Island (with this format coming from Barefaced TV/STV Studios). It began streaming on 25 September 2022. Teams compete for an increased £50,000 prize fund.

=== Teams ===
Teams		Status
The Beauties	The Geeks	Status
Aishah Akorede (Model)	Martin Thompson, 24 (Model Plane Enthusiast)	Winner
Charlotte Lily, 24 (Florist)	James Smith, 25 (Cosplayer)	Runner-up
Julie, 27 (Music Teacher)	Henry Calvert, 20 (Star Wars Fanatic)	Runner-up
Manon Roberts (IT Manager)	Nitish Doolub, 34 (Pokémon Trading Card Game Player)	Eliminated in episode 7
Eden (Beauty Therapist)	Sebastian (Dungeons & Dragons Player)	Eliminated in episode 4 Returned in episode 6 Re-eliminated in Episode 7
Sacha Jones (Beautician)	Liam O'Leary, 29 (Medical Writer)	Eliminated in episode 5
Saskia Mastin (Cheerleader)	James "JB" (Lego Creator)	Quit in episode 4
Abi Malc (Model)	Steven Anderson, 30 (Comic Book Seller)	Eliminated in episode 3

=== Episode progress ===
#	Contestants	Ep 1 (Note: There were no eliminations in the first two episodes - all challenge winners in Episodes 1 & 2 won a date with their partner. Matt & Mollie re-paired some contestants after each Episode's mixer in Episodes 1 & 2.) (Note: Beauties and Geeks alternated picking their original partners in Episode 1.)	Ep 2	Ep 3	Ep 4	Ep 5	Ep 6	Ep 7	Ep 8
1	Aishah	SAFE	SAFE (Note: Aishah was originally paired with Martin. She re-paired with Nitish.)	SAFE (Note: Aishah was originally re-paired with Nitish. She re-paired back with Martin.)	WIN	SAFE	SAFE	WIN	WINNER
1	Martin	SAFE	SAFE (Note: Martin was originally paired with Aishah. He re-paired with Eden.)	SAFE (Note: Martin was originally re-paired with Eden. He re-paired back with Aisha.)	SAFE	SAFE	SAFE	WIN	WINNER
2	Charlotte	SAFE	SAFE (Note: Charlotte was originally paired with Steven. She re-paired with James.)	WIN	SAFE	WIN	SAFE	WIN	RUNNER-UP
2	James	HIGH	SAFE (Note: James was originally paired with Abi. He re-paired with Charlotte.)	WIN	SAFE	WIN	SAFE	WIN	RUNNER-UP
2	Henry	HIGH	WIN	SAFE	SAFE	WIN	SAFE	RISK	RUNNER-UP
2	Julie	HIGH	SAFE	SAFE	SAFE	WIN	SAFE	RISK	RUNNER-UP
4	Manon	WIN	SAFE (Note: Manon was originally paired with Sebastian. She re-paired with Nitish.)	SAFE	WIN	RISK	WIN	OUT	
4	Nitish	SAFE	SAFE (Note: Nitish was originally paired with Eden. He re-paired with Aishah.)	SAFE (Note: Nitish was originally re-paired with Aishah. He re-paired again with Manon.)	SAFE	RISK	SAFE	OUT	
5	Eden	SAFE	SAFE (Note: Eden was originally paired with Nitish. She re-paired with Martin.)	SAFE (Note: Eden was originally re-paired with Martin. She re-paired again with Sebastian.)	OUT		IN	OUT	
5	Sebastian	WIN	SAFE	SAFE (Note: Sebastian was originally paired with Manon. He re-paired with Eden.)	OUT		IN	OUT	
6	Liam	SAFE	SAFE	RISK	RISK	OUT	OUT		
6	Sacha	SAFE	SAFE	RISK	RISK	OUT	OUT		
7	"JB"	WIN	SAFE	SAFE	QUIT				
7	Saskia	WIN	SAFE	SAFE	QUIT				
8	Abi	HIGH	SAFE (Note: Abi was originally paired with James. She re-paired with Steven.)	OUT			OUT		
8	Steven	SAFE	SAFE (Note: Steven was originally paired with Charlotte. He re-paired with Abi.)	OUT			OUT		

The contestants won the competition.
The contestants claimed the runner-up position in the competition.
The contestant won the challenge and won a date with their partner and/or was safe from elimination.
The contestant's partner won the challenge and won a date with their partner and/or was safe from elimination.
The contestant did not win the challenge but their pair was safe from elimination.
The contestant and their partner survived elimination.
The contestant quit the competition, eliminating them and their partner.
The contestant and their partner was eliminated.
The contestants were brought back into the competition.
The contestants competed to return to the competition, but did not succeed.

=== Challenges and eliminations ===
Episode	Beauty challenge (winner)	Geek challenge (winner)	Up for Elimination	Eliminated
1	Science Experiments (Saskia & JB and Manon & Sebastian) (Note: Four pairs won their head-to-head competitions in the Science Experiment challenge - two of whom were then chosen to go on a date.)			
2		Street Dance Battle (Henry)		
3	Radio Show (James (Note: This challenge winner won a makeover in lieu of a date with their partner.) & Charlotte)		Liam & Sacha; Abi & Steven	Abi & Steven
4	London Tour Guide (Manon and Aishah)		Eden & Sebastian; Liam & Sacha	Eden & Sebastian
5		Comedy Club Routine (James and Henry)	Nitish & Manon; Liam & Sacha	Liam & Sacha
6 (Note: All remaining geeks who had not received a makeover received one following the challenge.)	Live Action Roleplaying (Manon)		None (Note: For winning the challenge, Manon and her partner Nitish were given the choice to bring back one of the three eliminated teams (not including JB & Saskia). They chose Eden & Sebastian.)	
7	Supper Club (Aishah & Martin and Charlotte & James)		Eden & Sebastian; Henry & Julie; Manon & Nitish	Manon & Nitish; Eden & Sebastian (Note: Eden & Sebastian were announced as scoring the lowest in the elimination challenge and were therefore eliminated in fifth place.)
8	Cabaret Performance (Aishah & Martin)		None (Note: Eliminated teams voted for their winning pair.)	
