= Tracy Ifeachor =

British actress (born 1985)

- Born: Chinwe Tracy Ifeachor; February 13, 1985 (age 41); Plymouth, Devon, England
- Education: Webber Douglas Academy of Dramatic Art (BA)
- Occupation: Actress
- Years active: 2007–present

Tracy Ifeachor (//; born 13 February 1985) is a British television and theatre actress. She is best known for playing Aya Al-Rashid in The CW vampire series The Originals, and Abigail Naismith in the Doctor Who Christmas special, "The End of Time". She also starred as duty solicitor Cleo Roberts in the 2021 BBC drama, Showtrial. She had a leading role in Season 1 of the HBO Max series The Pitt as Dr. Heather Collins.

== Early life and education ==
Tracy Ifeachor was born on February 13, 1985 in Plymouth, Devon, England, to parents of Nigerian Igbo descent. She attended Plymouth College preparatory school and Eggbuckland College secondary school.

She then entered the Raleigh School of Speech and Drama under the tutorship of Norma Blake and the Deborah Bond Dance academy, where she enjoyed the ISTD syllabus in tap, ballet, modern, and jazz dance.

After completing her A-levels, Ifeachor used her gap year to audition for London drama schools and won a scholarship to the Webber Douglas Academy of Dramatic Art in London (later merged into the Central School of Speech and Drama).

== Career ==
After graduation from drama school, Ifeachor appeared in her first feature film, Blooded, directed by Ed Boase, and also appeared in two commercials. She made her theatre debut as Minerva in the Royal Shakespeare Company's production of Noughts & Crosses, directed and adapted by Dominic Cooke, before making her television debut as Leila in the "No Going Back" episode of BBC One's Casualty.

Ifeachor went on to play Rosalind in Tim Supple's As You Like It for the opening of the new Curve Theatre in Leicester. Whilst rehearsing, Ifeachor was offered the role of Abigail Naismith in David Tennant’s final two Doctor Who episodes ("The End Of Time" Parts One and Two) which were broadcast at Christmas 2009 and on New Year's Day 2010. She played the daughter of the billionaire Joshua Naismith (David Harewood) who wanted his daughter to achieve immortality.

Ifeachor played the role of Beneatha in Lorraine Hansberry's A Raisin in the Sun, directed by Michael Buffong, for the Royal Exchange Theatre in Manchester, which opened to rave reviews. She also played Ismene at The National Theatre in the premiere of Moira Buffini's play Welcome to Thebes, directed by Richard Eyre, from 15 June to September 2010.

Ifeachor's radio work includes the role of Queenie in the 2011 BBC Radio 4 Classic Serial production of Edna Ferber's Show Boat.

In 2016, Ifeachor was cast in the ABC thriller series Quantico in the recurring role of Lydia Hall.

She had the lead role as duty solicitor Cleo Roberts in the 2021 BBC drama, Showtrial.

== Other activities ==
Ifeachor is a member of the Royal Central School of Speech and Drama's independent equity committee and was made an honorary fellow of the school in 2022.

== Filmography ==
=== Film ===
Year	Film	Role	Notes	Ref.
2011	Blooded	Eve Jourdan		
2016	Billionaire Ransom	Nora Paulson	Originally titled Take Down	
2021	Confetti	Ms. Rachel		
2023	Wonka	Dorothy Smith	Cameo	
2026	Remain	Theresa		
2027	Air Bud Returns	Jasmine	Post-production	

=== Television ===
Year	Title	Role	Notes	Ref.
2009	Casualty	Lila	Episode: "No Going Back"	
2009–2010	Doctor Who	Abigail Naismith	Episodes: "The End of Time (Parts 1 & 2)"	
2012	Strike Back	Lilian Lutulu	Episodes: "Vengeance: Parts 7 & 8"	
2013	Jo	Laure	Episode: "Invalides"	
2014	Crossbones	Nenna Ajanlekoko	Main role; 9 episodes	
2014	Hawaii Five-0	Eris	Episode: "Ina Paha"	
2015–2016	The Originals	Aya Al-Rashid	Recurring role; 9 episodes (season 3)	
2016	Spark	Logan Reese	(unknown episodes)	
2016–2017	Quantico	Lydia Bates	Recurring role; 11 episodes (season 2)	
2017–2018	Legends of Tomorrow	Kuasa Jiwe	Recurring role; 7 episodes (season 3)	
2019	Treadstone	Tara Coleman	Main role; 8 episodes	
2021	Showtrial	Cleo Roberts	Main role; 5 episodes (series 1)	
2022	Curious George	Ciku	Voice role; Episode: "Count on George to Deliver / The Baby Elephant"	
2022	Mayflies	Iona	Miniseries; 2 episodes	
2022	Treason	Dede Alexander	Miniseries; 5 episodes	
2024	Twilight of the Gods	Freya	Voice role; Episodes: "You Will Gladden His Ravens" & "If I Had a Hammer"	
2025	The Pitt	Dr. Heather Collins	Main role; 11 episodes (season 1)	
2025	The Diplomat	Thema Aseidu-Dennison	Episode: "Schrodinger's Wife"	

=== Video games ===
Year	Title	Role	Notes	Ref.
2016	Star Wars: The Old Republic - Knights of the Eternal Throne	Elarea Aldraste / Lord Adacin / Major Korven	Voice role	
2023	Star Wars Jedi: Survivor	Santari Khri	Voice role	
2023	Starfield	Anna Imani / Abigail Morgan	Voice role	
2023	Spider-Man 2	Kraven's Hunters	Voice role	
