= Simon Haines =

British actor and filmmaker

- Born: Bristol, England
- Education: Selwyn College, Cambridge; Guildhall School of Music & Drama
- Occupations: Actor, director, writer
- Years active: 2009–present

Simon Haines is a British actor, director and writer. He portrayed Malendol in the fantasy series The Lord of the Rings: The Rings of Power, Owen Michaels in Emmerdale and Rod Reed in Murder Most Puzzling.

== Early life and education ==
Simon Haines was born in Bristol and grew up in Clevedon, Somerset. He studied English at Selwyn College, Cambridge and trained as an actor at the Guildhall School of Music & Drama, at the same time as Michaela Coel and Paapa Essiedu. He also trained in the Meisner technique, and with American acting and directing coach Adrienne Weiss. He received a Laurence Olivier Bursary from SOLT and he was highly commended at the Michael Bryant Awards by Sir Nicholas Hytner.

== Career ==
Whilst at Cambridge, Haines wrote and performed with the Cambridge Footlights, co-writing and performing the comedy sketch show Good Clean Men with Joey Batey, Ben Ashenden and Alex Owen (The Pin). He played Claudius in a production of Hamlet in Elsinore Castle and wrote a translation of Chekhov's The Seagull, starring Lily Cole, Joey Batey and Genevieve Gaunt.

His first professional role after drama school was as Demetrius/Flute in A Midsummer Night's Dream for London's Orange Tree Theatre. He made his West End debut as Christopher Wren in Agatha Christie's The Mousetrap in 2017. He has played a variety of stage roles including leading roles of Patrick, a "smoothly menacing" Hollywood screenwriter, in the 2018 UK premiere of Mart Crowley's play For Reasons That Remain Unclear, and Drew (the role originated by Armie Hammer on Broadway) in the UK premiere of Young Jean Lee's Straight White Men.

On screen, he portrayed the young Pope Boniface VIII in the Knights Templar series Knightfall, and he played pathologist Dr Benjamin Swift in ITV's true-crime drama Litvinenko, with David Tennant. His feature film debut was playing the role of police Sergeant Dan Byrne in the 2024 British crime thriller, Forgive Me Father, directed by Fredi Nwaka. He also played Paul Weyland ("the Einstein-killer from Berlin") in the Netflix feature film Einstein and the Bomb, sociologist Bezalel Sherman in BBC-PBS film Bombing Auschwitz, and the leading role of Jonas in the film Honeywell.

In 2024, he played the recurring role of elf commander Malendol in Amazon's The Lord of the Rings: The Rings of Power. He was already a Tolkien fan, but in preparing to play the role, he read Unfinished Tales and The Fall of Gondolin.

In 2025, he played villain Owen Michaels in 4 episodes of Emmerdale, until the character's death. He plays regional news anchorman Rod Reed in cozy crime series Murder Most Puzzling opposite Phyllis Logan. He improvised several of his character's news reports.

He plays an antagonist in Edgar Wright's 2025 feature film The Running Man, opposite Glen Powell. Wright and his co-writer Michael Bacall added some of Haines's improvisations from his audition into the final screenplay.

He plays Marine Sergeant Davis Carter in Ponies opposite Emilia Clarke and White Lotus star Haley Lu Richardson.

He stars in upcoming A24 comedy series It Gets Worse as Lucas, opposite Lena Dunham and Andrew Scott.

== Filmmaking ==
Haines's debut film as writer/director, Senior Consultant, premiered at the 2025 BAFTA-qualifying London Comedy Film Festival (LOCO). He admires the work of filmmaker Mike Leigh.

== Personal life ==
Haines is bisexual and dyspraxic. He was assessed for dyspraxia whilst studying at Cambridge University; he said: "The diagnosis was super helpful to just have the label and to sort of have a gentler relationship with myself". He plays jazz piano and supports Manchester United F.C.

== Filmography ==
=== Film ===
Year	Title	Role
2024	Forgive Me Father	Sgt. Dan Byrne
2024	Einstein and the Bomb	Paul Weyland
2024	Honeywell	Jonas (lead)
2025	The Running Man	Technico
2026	World on Fire	Mitch

=== Television ===
Year	Title	Role	Notes
2019	Bombing Auschwitz	Bezalel Sherman	Television film
2019	Knightfall	Father Benedetto	2 episodes
2022	Litvinenko	Benjamin Swift	2 episodes
2024	The Lord of the Rings: The Rings of Power	Malendol	3 episodes
2025	Emmerdale	Owen Michaels	4 episodes
2025–26	Murder Most Puzzling	Rod Reed	6 episodes
2026	Ponies	Sgt Davis Carter	
2026	It Gets Worse	Lucas	

=== Stage ===
Year	Title	Role	Venue
2008–2011	Cambridge Footlights	Writer/Performer	
2010	Twelfth Night	Orsino	Cambridge Arts Theatre
2011	Much Ado About Nothing	Leonato	Cambridge Arts Theatre
2011	The Seagull	Trigorin	ADC Theatre, Cambridge
2011	Hamlet	Claudius	Elsinore Castle, Denmark
2011	Animals and Children	Max	Het Nationale Theater (Dutch National Theatre)
2014	Sam Wanamaker Festival	Iachimo	Shakespeare's Globe
2014	A Midsummer Night's Dream	Demtrius/Flute	Orange Tree Theatre
2014	Told Look Younger	Obrad/Marco/Louise	Jermyn Street Theatre
2015	The Rubenstein Kiss	Matthew Rubenstein	Nottingham Theatre
2015	Posh	Dmitri	Nottingham Playhouse / Yvonne Arnaud Theatre
2016–2017	The Mousetrap	Christopher Wren	West End (London)
2018	For Reasons That Remain Unclear	Patrick	King's Head Theatre
2018	Europe After the Rain	Max	Mercury Theatre
2019	Wireless Operator	Alf (voice)	Park Theatre / Edinburgh Festival
2020	Everything Is Absolutely Fine	Anxiety	Theatr Clwyd
2021	Straight White Men	Drew	Southwark Playhouse
2022	Distinguished Villa	Alec	Finborough Theatre

=== Video games ===
Year	Title	Role	Notes
2024	Age of Empires II: Battle for Greece	Brasidas	Voice
