= Paul Weyland =

German antisemitic activist and novelist

Paul Wilhelm Gustav Weyland (20 January 1888, Berlin – 6 December 1972, Bad Pyrmont) was the antisemitic leader of the Anti Einstein League.

In 1919 Weyland published the novel Hie Kreuz - hie Triglaff (The Cross against the Triglav), which gives a chauvinistic account of the historical events of the tenth century A.D. in Pomerania. It ends with an open allusion to the contemporary conflicts between Germans and Poles in Upper Silesia. A second book Der Tanz als kulturelles Ausdrucksmittel (Dancing as an expression of culture) was promised, with a chapter on modern dance as a sign of cultural decline. However this book never appeared and Weyland was to move on to scientific theory.

Weyland was a key figure involved in organising an antisemitic campaign against relativity. In August 1920 he organised a mass meeting at the Berliner Philharmonie to contest Einstein's theory of relativity. After ensuring the meeting had been well-advertised in the newspapers, Weyland delivered a vituperative attack on Einstein, described as "with heavy artillery" in one newspaper. This attack consisted primarily of unsubstantial insults against the theory of relativity alongside claims that it was promoted by "the clique of [Einstein's] academic supporters". Weyland claimed that the theory constituted a form of hypnotic mass suggestion and Jewish arrogance, which was a product of an unsettling spiritually chaotic period and that it, amongst other repellent ideas, was poisoning German thought. It was this speech which culminated in the statement: "Relativity theory is scientific Dadaism".

He was later granted American citizenship.

== In popular culture ==
He was portrayed in the Netflix feature film Einstein and the Bomb by British actor Simon Haines.
