= James Walker (writer/filmmaker) =

British writer and filmmaker (born 1979)

James Walker (born 19 June 1979) is a British writer and filmmaker. He lives in London and studied at Radley College and Trinity College, Cambridge University where he read English and received a 1st Class Honors Degree. He is a director of Magma Pictures and the Young Film Academy. His first feature film, Blooded, had a UK cinema release on 1 April 2011 and was released on the UK DVD market. Blooded caused a great deal of controversy at the time of the film's release, promotional viral videos were removed from video-sharing websites following action by animal rights protesters.

== Directing credits ==
Into Swans
(Short film: 15 mins, 16mm) Drama (2004).

One Small Leap
(Short film: 3 mins, 16mm) Comedy (2002).

Taboo
(Short film: 30 mins, BetaSP) Thriller (1998).

Gemini
(Theatre) Produced ADC Theatre, Cambridge (2000).

On the Breast of a Woman
(Theatre) Produced ADC Theatre, Cambridge (2001).

== Writing credits ==
Blooded
(Feature film) Thriller (2011).

Proving Mr Jennings
(Theatre) Winner, King's Cross New Writing Award (2004).

Into Swans
(Short film) Drama (2003).

One Small Leap
(Short film) Comedy (2002).

On The Breast of a Woman
(Theatre) Drama. Produced Queens’ Theatre, Cambridge (2001).

Born to be Wild
(Theatre) Produced C Venues, Edinburgh Festival (2000).
Broadcast on BBC World Service, December (2000).

Gemini
(Theatre) Produced ADC Theatre, Cambridge (2000).

== Awards ==
=== Film ===
Winner, Best UK Short, Raindance 2003.

Winner, Cocotte-Minute Prix, Brest European Short Film Festival 2003.

HTV Award, Brief Encounters 2002.

Best Director, Capalbio International Film Festival 2003.

F.I.C.E Award, Capalbio International Film Festival 2003.

Runner-up, Aprille Award, Milan Film Festival 2002.

=== Theater ===
Winner, King’s Cross New Writing Award, 2004.

Nominated for London Writers Award, 2002.

Winner, BATS New Writing Award, 2000.

Selected to participate in the Berlinale Talent Campus, 2003.

== Blooded critical response ==
The film's topic has provoked reactions from parties on both side of the hunting debate in the UK. In promoting the film, its makers originally asserted that it was a re-creation of an actual event that occurred after the enactment of the 2005 hunting ban in England, maintaining that the film, rather than trying to make any political points, only investigates "the nature of extremism" in any form, and "encourages debate". The Evening Standard wrote that the film "caused outrage after graphic scenes showing activists attacking five deer-stalkers were posted on the internet, in a viral publicity campaign." The Independent noted the film's controversial stance, and that as the film's asserted protagonists were a group of extreme animal activists, it generated "much chatter on the interweb" after clips appeared on Youtube. They wrote however, "it all has the whiff of a clever publicity stunt". This is a stance echoed in many other online reviews with suggestions that it is a mockumentary that leaves the viewer with [sic] "no doubt that it is fabricated". The List classed it as an example of a "fantastic piece of filmmaking that shows what is achievable if you get creative within your budget".
