= Joanna Donnelly =

Irish meteorologist and weather presenter (born 1970)

- Born: 23 September 1970 (age 55); Dublin, Ireland
- Occupations: Met Eireann meteorologist RTÉ News weather presenter
- Employer: RTÉ
- Spouse: Harm Luijkx
- Children: 3

Joanna Donnelly (born 23 September 1970) is an Irish meteorologist and weather presenter.

== Career ==
Donnelly studied applied mathematics in Dublin City University. In 1995, Donnelly joined Met Éireann as meteorological assistant before being promoted to meteorologist in 2000. Donnelly has been working as a forecaster and broadcasting on RTÉ Radio 1 since February 2002. She began TV broadcasting in December 2015 and presents RTÉ One and RTÉ2 weather bulletins.

In January 2025, she took part in Dancing with the Stars. She was the third celebrity to be eliminated.

On 21 April 2025, at the end of an RTÉ weather bulletin, Donnelly announced that "That is my last broadcast". She later issued a statement that her departure was "nothing to do with my work product" and that "I hope anybody that's wondering what happened [knows] it wasn't the forecast". Donnelly went on to say that "A lot of people have been asking if I will talk. No, I'll talk next week when I'm back". She said that she remained a Met Éireann forecaster "for now".

While, on 2 September 2025, Donnelly announced an intention to seek a nomination for the 2025 Irish presidential election, by 5 September 2025 she had reportedly withdrawn from the nomination process and the election.

== Other work ==
In 2010, Donnelly and her friend, Fiona McPhillips, set up the charity, Pomegranate, which helps families to pay for fertility treatment.

Donnelly is also a published author having written two books, The Great Irish Weather Book, published in 2018 and From Malin Head to Mizen Head, published in 2023.

== Personal life ==
Donnelly married fellow meteorologist Harm Luijkx in 2000. They have three children together. One of her daughters is a model and artist. They reside in the Dublin suburb of Portmarnock. Donnelly has spoken openly about her struggles with pregnancy, having experienced seven miscarriages. Donnelly has spoken about the effect of grief can have mentally, having lost her brother at the age of 34 as well as her father when she was three years old, and her mother in 2021.

Donnelly has spoken out about suffering from insomnia for the last thirty years. She has opened up about experience with sexual harassment early in her career. In 2020, Donnelly was a victim of a road rage assault when a motorist strangled her.

Donnelly's interests include yoga and taking part in triathlons. In 2015 she completed the Dublin City Marathon. Donnelly is also an accomplished seamstress and knitter. She also enjoys the cinema and going to the theatre. Donnelly has a tattoo of a lightning bolt on her stomach emphasising the stretch marks she received from giving birth.
