= Miriam Mullins =

Irish media personality

- Born: 21 December 1995 (age 30); Garryvoe, County Cork, Ireland
- Occupations: Social media personality; radio presenter
- Years active: 2020–present
- Parents: Martin (father); Mary (mother)
- Relatives: Padraig (brother) Havier (stepfather)

TikTok information
- Page: miriammullins_
- Followers: 2.1 million

Miriam Mullins (born 21 December 1995) is an Irish social media personality and radio presenter. She is known for her comedy videos on the social media platform, TikTok.

== Career ==
Mullins first gained a social media following, during the COVID-19 pandemic, with pranks, comedy and other videos. In December 2021, Mullins was described by an article in the Irish Examiner as "the most famous person in Ireland you've never heard of" due to her social media following.

In early 2023, Mullins joined Cork's Red FM as the host of the 7pm–12am show 'Red Hits'.

Mullins has appeared on several Irish television programmes including The Late Late Show, The 6 O'Clock Show and Today. She appeared in a 2022 episode of Eating with the Enemy on Virgin Media One.

In December 2023, Mullins was announced as one of the eleven celebrities taking part in the seventh season of Dancing with the Stars. Her participation was revealed during an appearance on The Late Late Show. Mullins and her partner Montel Hewson were the second pairing to be voted off.

== Personal life ==
Mullins was in a relationship with South African social media influencer, Tiaan Heyns but they are no longer dating.
