= Magma Pictures =

Production company based in London

Magma Pictures Limited is a film production company based in London, founded in 2004 by directors James Walker and Ed Boase who have been working together in the film industry. Magma Pictures' educational sister company is Young Film Academy. Magma Pictures specialises in feature films and corporate films.

== History ==
Magma Pictures' films have been shown in over fifty festivals worldwide and broadcast on BBC Four, HTV, Canal+ and Rai 1, among others. Their awards include Best UK Short (Raindance Film Festival), Cocotte-Minute Grand Prix ( Brest European Short Film Festival ) and Best Director (Capalbio International Film Festival). James Walker (director) graduated from Trinity College, Cambridge in 2001. He was nominated for the London Writer's Award in 2002 and won the King's Cross New Writing Award, 2004. He has since been commissioned by the National Theatre and is writing for television. Ed Boase (director) graduated from the London College of Printing in 2001. His latest short film Home Video was shortlisted for Best Newcomer at the Rushes Short Film Festival and won the Silver Melies award at the Leeds International Film Festival 2006. Magma Pictures' first feature film is Blooded, which received UK theatrical and DVD release in April 2011.

== Films ==
Magma's films include:

- Blooded
- Taboo
- One Small Leap
- Trigger
- Into Swans
- ctrl+z
- Home Video

== Awards ==
- Best Newcomer Rushes Short Film Festival 2006
- Silver Melies Leeds International Film Festival 2006
- Winner, Best UK Short, Raindance 2003
- Winner, Cocotte-Minute Prix, Brest Film Festival 2003
- HTV Award, Brief Encounters 2002
- Best Director, Capalbio International Film Festival 2003
- F.I.C.E. Award, Capalbio International Film Festival 2003
- Runner-up, Aprille Award, Milan Film Festival 2002

== Screening ==
Screened on BBC Four, HTV, Canal +, Rai Uno.

== Blooded ==
In June 2008, directors Ed Boase and James Walker completed principal photography on their first feature film, Blooded, set on the Isle of Mull in Scotland. The film, made with collaborator Nick Ashdon (Ptarmigan ACP), had a UK release on 1 April 2011 by Revolver Entertainment.
