= Oliver Boot =

English actor (born 1979)

- Born: 1979 (age 46–47); Camden, London, England
- Occupation: Actor
- Spouses: Helen George (m. 2011; div. 2015) Emma Harrold (m. 2023)

Oliver Boot (born 1979) is an English actor. He trained at RADA, and has appeared on both stage and screen. His theatre credits include Antony and Cleopatra, In Extremis (in the role of Abelard), Three Musketeers, Hayfever, Tartuffe, Jamaica Inn and an award-winning world tour of Othello with Cheek by Jowl. He has starred as Demetrius in Shakespeare's A Midsummer Night's Dream and as Ventidius in Timon of Athens, at the Globe, in London.

In 2006 he was asked to perform Henry V for Elizabeth II and Prince Philip at a private dinner party thrown by the American embassy. He has also acted in the popular TV series Two Pints of Lager and a Packet of Crisps, As If, The Time of Your Life, Hotel Babylon, Distant Shores, Holby City, Garrow's Law and My Family.

His film credits include Blooded an independent British film about the hunting ban in the '90s and more recently he played opposite Mark Strong and Dominic West in the Disney film John Carter.

== Filmography ==
=== Film ===
Year	Title	Role	Notes
2011	Blooded	Charlie Bell	
2012	John Carter	Bodyguard	
2021	Liberté	Hans Josef Kieffer	Short

=== Television ===
Year	Title	Role	Notes
2002-2003	Two Pints of Lager and a Packet of Crisps	Andy	4 episodes
2004	As If	Max	Episode: "Nicki's POV"
2007	The Time of Your Life	Matt	Mini-series
2008	Hotel Babylon	Andrew	1 episode
2008	Distant Shores	Jake	Recurring role
2009	Holby City	Ben Woodman	9 episodes
2009	Garrow's Law	Charles Lynam	1 episode
2011	My Family	Andre	2 episodes
2012	One Night	Mr. Walker	Mini-series
2013	Great Night Out	Wayne	2 episodes
2020	Endeavour	Tony Jakobssen	Episode: "Oracle"
