= Jillian Bromwich =

Irish ballroom dancer and choreographer (born 2002)

- Born: 23 January 2002 (age 24); Templeogue, Dublin
- Occupations: Dancer; Choreographer

Jillian Bromwich (born 23 January 2002) is an Irish ballroom and Latin dancer and choreographer and World Youth Under 21 Latin Champion with her partner, Montel Hewson.

== Early life ==
Bromwich started dancing when she was six years old. Bromwich speaks about how she was an incredibly shy child growing up and had trouble speaking up for herself. Dancing was seen as an avenue for her to help express her personality.

== Career ==
Since November 2018, Bromwich has danced with her current partner, Montel Hewson. They have achieved noteworthy results in several competitions including coming third at the WDC AL Rising Star Latin competition. at Last 78 finish in Blackpool Youth Under 21 Latin on 25 May 2019. On 9 November 2019, the couple finished in 15th place at Under 19 in a competition held in De Bonte Wever in Netherlands. In May 2022, the couple won the World Dance Organisation World Youth Under 21 Latin Championships. The couple were named All Ireland Open Latin Amateur Champions on 25 June 2022.

== Dancing with the Stars ==
In October 2023, it was reported that Bromwich would join the seventh series of the Irish version of Dancing with the Stars. The news was officially confirmed on 28 November 2023. On 17 December 2023, it was confirmed that Bromwich would partner former Mrs. Brown's Boys actor, Rory Cowan for the seventh season of the show. They were the first couple to be eliminated from the competition. Bronwich departed the programme after one series.

Series	Partner	Place
7	Rory Cowan	11th

Series 7 – with celebrity partner Rory Cowan

Week No.	Dance/Song	Judges' score			Total	Result
Week No.	Dance/Song	Redmond	Barry	Gourounlian	Total	Result
1	Charleston / "When I'm Sixty-Four"	3	4	4	11	No elimination
2	Viennese Waltz / "That's Amore"	4	5	5	14	No elimination
3	Salsa / "Macarena"	3	5	5	13	Eliminated

== Personal life ==
Bromwich is in a relationship with her professional dance partner, Montel Hewson.
