= Victoria Martin =

British professor of collider physics

Victoria Martin FRSE
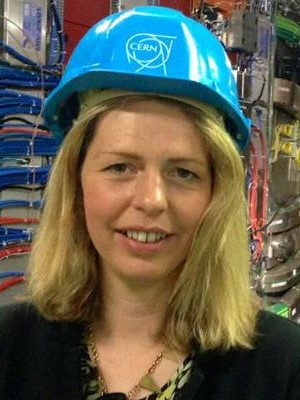
- Victoria Martin at the CMS experiment at CERN
- Born: Victoria Jane Martin
- Education: University of Edinburgh (BSc, PhD)
- Awards: MacMillan Lecture (2013)
- Scientific career
- Workplaces: University of Edinburgh; Northwestern University; CERN
- Thesis: A measurement of the CP violation parameter Re(e'/e) (2000)
- Doctoral advisor: Alan Walker; Ian Knowles
- Website: www.ph.ed.ac.uk/people/victoria-martin

Victoria Jane Martin FRSE is a Scottish physicist who is Professor of Collider Physics at the University of Edinburgh. She works on the Higgs boson as part of the ATLAS experiment.

== Early life and education ==
Martin studied mathematical physics at the University of Edinburgh, graduating with a Bachelor of Science degree in 1996. She remained there for her postgraduate studies, working on CP violation on the NA48 experiment. She completed her PhD thesis A measurement of the CP violation parameter Re(e'/e) in 2000. During her PhD she visited CERN, where she enjoyed the diverse disciplines of people she worked with. She was a student of Peter Higgs.

== Research and career ==
Martin spent five years as a postdoctoral researcher at Northwestern University. She returned to Edinburgh in 2005, where she was appointed a lecturer. She is a member of the Royal Society of Edinburgh Young Academy.

Martin works on the ATLAS experiment and Compact Linear Collider. She has received significant funding from the Science and Technology Facilities Council to support upgrades to the particle collider. She is searching for the Higgs boson production, in association with top quarks. She looks for how it couples to the fermions of the Standard Model. She gave the 2013 MacMillan Lecture at the Institution of Engineers and Shipbuilders in Scotland. She took a sabbatical at CERN in 2015. During this time, she delivered the Royal Institution lecture Big Bucks for Big Bosons: Should we still be paying for the Large Hadron Collider?. In 2017 she took part in a British Council tour of India, talking about the Higgs boson. Martin is the Chair of the Science and Technology Facilities Council (STFC) peer review panel and the theme leader for the Scottish Universities' Physics Alliance. She is also involved in the teaching and administration of several courses at The University of Edinburgh.

Martin is on the Board of Trustees of the Royal Society of Edinburgh and the advisory board of Perspective Realism. She took part in the Edinburgh Festival Fringe. She has taken part in several interviews with the BBC.

Martin was elected a Fellow of the Royal Society of Edinburgh in 2024.
