= Montel Hewson =

Irish ballroom and Latin dancer

- Born: 15 May 2001 (age 23); Templeogue, Dublin
- Occupation(s): Dancer; Choreographer

Montel Hewson (born 15 May 2001) is an Irish ballroom and Latin dancer and choreographer and World Youth Under 21 Latin Champion with his partner, Jillian Bromwich.

== Early life ==
Hewson was born in Dublin in 2001. At a couple of months old he moved to Romania with his mother and two siblings. He began Latin and Ballroom dancing at the age of two. He continued dancing up to the age of nine competing all around Romania falling in love with all types of dancing.

Before his tenth birthday Hewson family moved to Spain and his dancing career was put on hold to pursue a football career in a leading Spanish youth football academy.

Hewson and his family returned to Ireland when he was twelve and he began dancing again where he met his current professional partner and girlfriend, Jillian Bromwich. However, they didn't begin dancing together as a couple until 2018.

== Career ==
Hewson began his amateur dance career dancing with Dion Radu between May 2013 and June 2014. Together, they competed in several Irish Open competitions earning numerous first places. From January 2015 to June 2016, Hewson partnered with Megan Brack. They accomplished high results in both Junior and Youth competitions throughout their time together. From November 2016 to December 2017, Hewson teamed up with Georgia Hendrick competing in both Irish and UK Championships. They also competed together in China.

Since November 2018, Hewson has danced with his current partner, Jillian Bromwich. They have achieved noteworthy results in several competitions including coming third at the WDC AL Rising Star Latin competition. at Last 78 finish in Blackpool Youth Under 21 Latin on 25 May 2019. On 9 November 2019, the couple finished in 15th place at Under 19 in a competition held in De Bonte Wever in Netherlands. In May 2022, the coupled won the World Dance Organisation World Youth Under 21 Latin Championships. The couple were named All Ireland Open Latin Amateur Champions on 25 June 2022.

== Dancing with the Stars ==
In October 2023, it was reported that Hewson would join the seventh series of the Irish version of Dancing with the Stars. The news was officially confirmed on 28 November 2023. On 17 December 2023, it was announced that Hewson would partner social media personality, Miriam Mullins for the seventh season of the show. They were the second couple to be eliminated from the competition.

Series	Partner	Place
7	Miriam Mullins	10th

Series 7 – with celebrity partner Miriam Mullins

Week No.	Dance/Song	Judges' score			Total	Result
Week No.	Dance/Song	Redmond	Barry	Gourounlian	Total	Result
1	Quickstep / "Fascination"	6	6	6	18	No elimination
2	Samba / "Calm Down"	7	7	7	21	No elimination
3	Foxtrot / "Heaven"	7	6	7	20	Safe
4	Cha-cha-cha / "Can't Stop the Feeling!"	6	7	7	20	Eliminated

== Personal life ==
In 2019, Hewson lost his sister, Alli MacDonnell to suicide. He has spoken openly about the effect the loss had on him and how he dedicates every dance to her and believes he is doing her proud. Hewson is in a relationship with his professional dance partner, Jillian Bromwich.
