= Adam Best (actor) =

Northern Ireland actor (born 1983)

- Born: 16 November 1983 (age 42); Donaghadee, County Down, Northern Ireland
- Education: Royal Welsh College of Music and Drama
- Occupation: Actor
- Years active: 2004–present

Adam Best (born 16 November 1983) is an actor from Northern Ireland, known for his roles in Holby City, Say Nothing, Blue Lights, Black Doves, Kneecap and Murder Most Puzzling.

== Early life and education ==
Adam Best was born in Donaghadee, County Down on 16 November 1983. He attended Donaghadee Primary School and Bangor Grammar School and gained experience with the Ulster Youth Theatre and Drama School.

He trained at the Royal Welsh College of Music and Drama for three years and graduated in 2004.

== Career ==
Best played Matt Parker on the BBC One drama Holby City from 2005 to 2007. He has also appeared in episodes of Silent Witness, The Bill, and Waking the Dead, as well as The Catherine Tate Show Christmas Special in 2007.

In 2011 Best took part in an advertisement for Meteor.

He played the role of Joe Lynskey in the 2024 TV drama about The Troubles in Northern Ireland, Say Nothing. In the same year, he played Doyle in the BAFTA-winning feature film Kneecap.

In 2025, he played series regular DCI Derek Hooper in the TV adaption of Parnell Hall’s Puzzle Lady books, Murder Most Puzzling.

== Filmography ==
=== Film ===
- Cup Cake (2010) as PJ Johnson
- Blooded (2011) as Ben Fitzpatrick
- Kneecap (2024) as Doyle

=== Television ===
Year	Title	Role	Notes	Ref.
2004	Silent Witness	Young David Kelman	Episode: "A Time to Heal: Part 1"	
2005–2007	Holby City	Matt Parker	Series regular	
2007	The Catherine Tate Show	Various characters	Episode: "Christmas Special"	
2009	The Bill	Connor Deegan	Episode: "On the Money"	
2009	Waking the Dead	Young Father Quinn	2 episodes	
2012	Silent Witness	D.S. Winter	Episode: "Death Has No Dominion: Part 1"	
2017	Doctors	Tony Marshall	Episode: "Seven Years"	
2019	Giri/Haji	Terry	Episode #1.6	
2022	Peaky Blinders	Sam Ryan	2 episodes	
2022	The Lazarus Project	D.S. Cooper	2 episodes	
2023	The Crown	Journalist Nick	2 episodes	
2024	Hope Street	Jared Power	Episode #3.12	
2024	Blue Lights	Keith Wylie	4 episodes	
2024	Say Nothing	Joe Lynskey	3 episodes	
2024	Black Doves	Jim Perryman	2 episodes	
2024	All Creatures Great and Small	Major Robertson	Episode: "All God's Creatures"	
2025	Murder Most Puzzling	DCI Hooper	6 episodes	

== Theatre ==
Year	Title	Role	Company	Director	Notes
2014	Long Day's Journey into Night	James Tyrone Jr.	Lyceum Theatre, Edinburgh	Tony Cownie	

Other stage roles include:

- The Caucasian Chalk Circle (1998) as Old Man
- The Wizard of Oz (2000) as Wizard
- Blackout (2003) as Danny
- The Woman in Black (2012) as The Actor
- Public Enemy (2013) as Horster
- The Beauty Queen of Leenane as Pato; Lyric Theatre (Hammersmith), London (2021)
