= Aishah Akorede =

Irish model (born 1999)

- Born: 17 October 1999 (age 26); Leixlip, Ireland
- Occupation: Model
- Height: 1.79 m (5 ft 10 1/2 in)
- Beauty pageant titleholder
- Title: Miss Universe Ireland 2023
- Major competitions: Miss Universe Ireland 2023 (Winner); Miss Universe 2023 (Unplaced)

Aishah Akorede (born 17 October 1999) is an Irish model and beauty pageant titleholder who was crowned Miss Universe Ireland 2023 and represented her country at the Miss Universe 2023 pageant. Originating from County Kildare, Akorede is a Queen's University Belfast graduate.

Akorede took over Katherine Walker, a Northern Irish model and nurse who won in 2021.

She holds a Master of Law in International Corporate Governance with a Degree Plus Employability Award from Queen's University and is pursuing a Chartered Governance Qualification Programme. She is ethnic Yoruba.

== Pageantry ==
Akorede represented Ireland at the 72nd Miss Universe competition held in El Salvador on 18 November 2023.

== Media career ==
In 2022, Akorede appeared in the British series Beauty and the Geek on Discovery+ hosted by Mollie King and Matt Edmondson. Akorede partnered model plane-enthusiast, Martin Thompson. The team eventually won the show, winning £50,000.

On 9 December 2024, Akorede was the first celebrity announced to be taking part in the eighth season of the Irish version of Dancing with the Stars.

Awards and achievements
Preceded by Katharine Walker	Miss Universe Ireland; 2023	Succeeded by Sofia Labus
