= Young Film Academy =

English educational institution

The Young Film Academy (YFA), based in London, is an English educational institution and the sister company to Magma Pictures. The academy is the UK's leading provider of practical filmmaking programs to young people aged 8–18. YFA works with over 80 of the UK's leading independent and state schools with their flagship programs, the "One Day Film School". YFA is also the workshop provider for UK arts festivals, including the Guardian Hay Festival and The Edinburgh International Film Festival, The Minghella Film Festival, The High Tide Festival, and the Barbican's London Children's Film Festival.

== History ==
Directors James Walker (writer/filmmaker) and Ed Boase co-founded Young Film Academy in 2004. Today, Young Film Academy (YFA) provides to young people aged 6–19 filmmaking courses, school filmmaking programs, community filmmaking projects, filmmaking outreach events, and kids' film parties.

Based in London, YFA also works internationally to help over 7,500 young people each year complete their first digital films, including West End-premiered movies and curriculum-linked film projects in schools.

Young Film Academy is a hub partner in the British Film Institute (BFI) Film Academy Network helping to find top UK emerging talent. YFA designs and delivers educational film projects for the UKʼs largest arts institutions but also helps small groups of kids who just want to make movies as a hobby or host filmmaking parties at home.

In 2025, YFA partnered with EE and the British Academy of Film and Television Arts (BAFTA) to deliver Set the Stage, a hands-on experience in film production and an insight into the screen industries for young and aspiring filmmakers. The initiative brought together 16 teenage participants who collaborated to produce a short film under the mentorship of industry professionals, including BAFTA-nominated actor Daisy Edgar-Jones and David Jonsson, winner of the EE Rising Star Award in 2025. YFA delivered the practical components of the programme. The project was designed to encourage young people to apply skills developed through digital media, gaming and technology to filmmaking, demonstrating potential career pathways within the creative industries.

Each year, YFA hosts The Young Film Academy Awards to recognise and reward outstanding young filmmakers and screen actors who participate in its programmes. The awards ceremony has taken place at the BFI at the end of each summer and in 2025, the awards were held for the first time at the Prince Charles Cinema. In 2024, an Open Category was introduced to recognise young filmmaking talent from around the world, open to participants who are not students of Young Film Academy programmes.

In February 2026, YFA hosted The Young Film Academy Awards: ALL STARS celebrating ten years of its annual awards ceremony. Nominees and their guests attended a red carpet, awards ceremony and after-party at the historic Genesis Cinema. The celebration featured a retrospective competition in which the best films and performances from the first ten years of the Young Film Academy Awards competed for an “All Star” title. The ten categories were judged by a line-up of industry professionals from across the film and television industry. The judges included actors Chinenye Ezeudu and Kedar Williams-Stirling, known for their roles as Viv and Jackson in the television series Sex Education; film editor Eddie Hamilton, whose credits include Top Gun: Maverick and recent entries to the Mission: Impossible franchise; actor Kate Phillips, known for her roles in Peaky Blinders, The Crown and Downton Abbey; and art director Olly Williams, whose work includes Gladiator II and Bohemian Rhapsody. The panel also included executive producer Jamie Campbell, cinematographer and director Steven Bernstein, film critic Anna Smith, film festival strategist Rebekah Louisa Smith, and animal trainer for film & TV Grace Dickinson. An additional Audience Award for Best Comedy was decided by public vote.

== Programs of study ==
Young Film Academy provides several types of filmmaking and screen acting courses, workshops and products including:

- Residential summer camps
- Project Paradiso, a prestige project offering a select group of YFA’s most promising students the chance to create a stunning short film in Sicily, Italy
- Day courses
- Extended courses
- Weekend courses and clubs
- Online and remote courses
- Single-day film programs for schools
- Advanced workshops for schools
- Prospectus films for schools
- Rough-cut workshop
- Filmmaking parties for youth
- Star-in music videos or film parties

== Media coverage ==
Young Film Academy has been featured positively in several publications. Website IOM Today wrote, "The academy is seen as an investment in the future of British film," and TimeOut London wrote, "Ed Boase and James Walker have come up with an exciting party concept: kids shoot, edit and screen a film in a single day. Its success boils down to a combination of talent and teamwork.".
