= A La Carte (group) =

German pop-disco girl group

- The A La Carte trio in March 1980 (from left to right: Patsy Fuller, Katie Humble and Jenny Renshaw)

Background information
- Origin: London, England
- Genres: Euro disco; Disco; Electronic
- Years active: 1978–1984
- Labels: Hansa Records
- Past members: Patsy Fuller (1978 - 1980); Julia (1978 - 1979); Elaine (1978 - 1979); Jennifer Renshaw (1979 - 1984); Denise Distell (1979 - 1980); Katie Humble (1980 - 1981); Linda Daniels (1981 - 1984); Joy Martin (1981 - 1984)

A La Carte was a pop-disco girl group formed in 1978, and based in Germany. Producers Tony Hendrik and Karin Hartmann helped with the start up of the group. The trio originally included three British girls: Patsy Fuller, Julia and Elaine. Their first song was When the Boys Come Home, released in March 1979. With a performance in the Musikladen TV show, the group gained immense popularity in Germany. For unknown reasons, the line-ups often changed with the release of new singles. Jenny Renshaw became the only permanent member when she joined the group in October 1979. By 1981, the group was made up of Jenny Renshaw, Linda Daniels and Joy Martin. Together, they released the album Viva. The group underwent many more line-up changes afterwards also. In 1982, they recorded their "Rockin' Oldies" album, which included numerous covers of 1960s songs. The group disbanded in 1984. The final line-up featured Jenny Renshaw, Joy Martin and Katie Humble. Other women disco groups like A La Carte were very popular in Europe at the time. Such as, Arabesque, (also from Germany), Luv' and Maywood (both from the Netherlands) and Baccara (from Spain). Popularity for the disco music genre as a whole declined with the development of newer music styles, which ultimately led to the girl groups breaking up.

== Discography ==
Studio albums :

- 1980: Do Wah Diddy Diddy Round
- 1981: Viva
- 1983: Rockin' Oldies

=== Singles ===
- 1979: "When The Boys Come Home" / "Price Of Love"
- 1979: "Doctor Doctor (Help Me Please)" / "It Was A Night Of Wonder"
- 1980: "Do Wah Diddy Diddy" / "Farewell, Farewell To Carlingford"
- 1980: "Ring Me, Honey" / "Jimmy Gimme Reggae"
- 1981: "You Get Me On The Run" / "Red Indian Drums"
- 1981: "River Blue" / "Morning Songbird"
- 1981: "Have You Forgotten (Wolga Song)" / "Bananas"
- 1982: "Viva Torero" / "Try A Little Tenderness"
- 1982: "In The Summer Sun Of Greece" / "Cubatao"
- 1982: "Ahe Tamouré" / "Wanted (Jean Le Voleur)"
- 1983: "Radio" / "You're Still My Fantasy"
- 1983: "On Top Of Old Smokie" / "Cotton Fields"
- 1984: "Jimmy Gimme Reggae" / "Lightyears Away From Home"
