= Kin (Irish TV series) =

Crime drama on Irish TV

- Promotional poster for the first series
- Genre: Crime drama
- Created by: Peter McKenna; Ciaran Donnelly
- Showrunner: Peter McKenna
- Written by: Peter McKenna
- Directed by: Diarmuid Goggins; Tessa Hoffe
- Starring: Charlie Cox; Clare Dunne; Aidan Gillen; Emmett J. Scanlan; Maria Doyle Kennedy; Sam Keeley; Yasmin Seky; Ciarán Hinds; Francis Magee; Danielle Galligan
- Theme music composer: David Holmes
- Country of origin: Ireland
- Original language: English
- No. of seasons: 2
- No. of episodes: 16

Production
- Executive producers: Peter McKenna; Ciaran Donnelly; Christian Baute; David Davoli; Samantha Thomas; Steven Thibault; Aaron L. Gilbert; Laurence Lenica; Franck Calderon; Tom Sherry
- Producers: James Flynn; Edmund Sampson
- Production location: Dublin
- Cinematography: James Mather
- Editor: Edel McDonnell
- Running time: 50 minutes
- Production companies: RTÉ; Bron Studios; Headline Pictures; Nordic Entertainment Group

Original release
- Network: RTÉ One
- Release: 9 September 2021 – 7 May 2023

Kin is an Irish crime drama television series, co-created by Peter McKenna and Ciaran Donnelly, that was first broadcast on 9 September 2021 on RTÉ One. The series revolves around a fictional Dublin family embroiled in gangland war, and stars Aidan Gillen and Ciarán Hinds as rival gang leaders Frank Kinsella and Eamon Cunningham. It became one of the most-watched series in Ireland. A second series followed in 2023. A third series is in production as of July 2026. The series was acquired by the BBC in 2023 and by Netflix in 2024.

== Background ==
The series was first announced in November 2020, with co-creator Peter McKenna set as showrunner and Diarmuid Goggins as director of the first four episodes. Tessa Hoffe was later announced as director of episodes five to eight.

Prior to the series' premiere, several news outlets stated the series was inspired by the Kinahan gang and the Hutch–Kinahan feud, and noted similarities to former RTE staple Love/Hate. A show "insider" stated that "This is not the Kinahans' story, but people can draw their own conclusions. Viewers will be able to make up their own mind about it."

== Cast and characters ==
=== Main ===
- Charlie Cox as Michael Kinsella ("The Magician"), Jimmy's younger brother, Brendan's youngest son; Frank and Bridget's nephew; Eric's cousin and Anna's father
- Clare Dunne as Amanda Kinsella, Jimmy's wife, Michael's sister-in-law, Jamie and Anthony's mother, and Brendan's daughter-in-law
- Aidan Gillen as Frank Kinsella, Jimmy and Michael's uncle, Bridget and Brendan's brother and Eric's father
- Emmett J. Scanlan as Jimmy Kinsella, Brendan's eldest son, Amanda's husband, Michael's older brother, Frank and Bridget's nephew and Eric's cousin
- Maria Doyle Kennedy as Bridget "Birdy" Goggins, Frank and Brendan's sister, Jimmy and Michael's aunt
- Sam Keeley as Eric "Viking" Kinsella, Frank's son, Nikita's boyfriend, Jimmy and Michael's cousin and Bridget and Brendan's nephew
- Yasmin Seky as Nikita Murphy, Eric's girlfriend
- Ciarán Hinds as Eamon Cunningham (series 1), Dublin-based crime boss
- Francis Magee as Brendan "Bren" Kinsella (series 2; guest series 1), Michael and Jimmy's father, Frank and Bridget's brother; Amanda's father-in-law; Eric's uncle and Jamie, Anthony and Anna's grandfather
- Danielle Galligan as Molly (series 2; guest series 1)

=== Supporting ===
- Hannah Adeogun as Anna Areoye, Michael's daughter, Jimmy's niece and Brendan's granddaughter
- Mark Mckenna Jr as Anthony Kinsella, Jimmy and Amanda's son
- Keith McErlean as Con Doyle, Eamon Cunningham's enforcer
- Ryan Lincoln as Isaac "Kem" Kemela, Kinsella family enforcer
- Ben Carolan as Glen Wright, a cold, young hitman
- Shane Quigley Murphy as Dean Fearon, a local street dealer
- Neill Fleming as Dotser Reid, a veteran lieutenant and driver fiercely loyal to Frank Kinsella
- Thommas Kane Byrne as Francis "Fudge" Flynn, a close associate and friend of Eric "Viking" Kinsella.
- Cian Fitzsimons as Jamie Kinsella, Jimmy and Amanda's son
- Fiona Bell as Angela Cunningham, Eamon's wife
- Lloyd Cooney as Caolán Moore, a low-level dealer working for the Cunningham cartel
- Stephen Jones as Noel Lawlor, a local associate who helps the Kinsellas with logistics and vehicles
- Denise McCormack as Jenny Lawlor, Noel's sister
- Öykü Karayel as Nuray Batuk (series 2), an intelligent, stylish, and ruthless leader of a Turkish international drug cartel
- Kenan Ece as Hamza (series 2), a powerful Turkish gangster and Nuray's chief rival within her own cartel.

== Episodes ==
=== Series overview ===
Series	Episodes	Originally released	
Series	Episodes	First released	Last released
1	8	12 September 2021	31 October 2021
2	8	19 March 2023	7 May 2023

=== Series 1 (2021) ===
No. overall	No. in season	Title	Directed by	Written by	Original release date	Ireland viewers (millions)
1	1	"Episode 1"	Diarmuid Goggins	Peter McKenna	12 September 2021	N/A
A feud between local gang leaders Frank Kinsella and Eamon Cunningham is intensified when Frank's son Eric tries to take out one of Eamon's dealers, Caolan Moore, over a petty feud.
2	2	"Episode 2"	Diarmuid Goggins	Peter McKenna	19 September 2021	N/A
Reeling from the death in the family, the Kinsellas argue about whether or not they should retaliate, going against Frank who just struck a deal with Cunningham.
3	3	"Episode 3"	Diarmuid Goggins	Peter McKenna	26 September 2021	N/A
The day of the funeral arrives, and the Kinsellas decide to strike back at those who were ultimately responsible for the murder, but not everything goes to plan.
4	4	"Episode 4"	Diarmuid Goggins	Peter McKenna	3 October 2021	N/A
5	5	"Episode 5"	Tessa Hoffe	Peter McKenna	10 October 2021	N/A
6	6	"Episode 6"	Tessa Hoffe	Peter McKenna	17 October 2021	N/A
7	7	"Episode 7"	Tessa Hoffe	Peter McKenna	24 October 2021	N/A
8	8	"Episode 8"	Tessa Hoffe	Peter McKenna	31 October 2021	N/A
Amanda’s plan to take down Eamon comes into fruition.

=== Series 2 (2023) ===
No. overall	No. in season	Title	Directed by	Written by	Original release date	Ireland viewers (millions)
9	1	"Episode 1"	Felix Thompson	Peter McKenna	19 March 2023	N/A
10	2	"Episode 2"	Felix Thompson	Peter McKenna	26 March 2023	N/A
11	3	"Episode 3"	Christine Molloy and Joe Lawlor	Peter McKenna	2 April 2023	N/A
12	4	"Episode 4"	Christine Molloy and Joe Lawlor	Peter McKenna	9 April 2023	N/A
13	5	"Episode 5"	Kate Dolan	Peter McKenna	16 April 2023	N/A
14	6	"Episode 6"	Kate Dolan	Peter McKenna	22 April 2023	N/A
15	7	"Episode 7"	Felix Thompson	Peter McKenna	30 April 2023	N/A
16	8	"Episode 8"	Felix Thompson	Peter McKenna	7 May 2023	N/A

== Production ==
Peter McKenna is the creator and main writer of the series.

== Release ==
Kin aired on RTÉ in 2021, with the second season following in 2023. The series quickly gained popularity in Ireland after premiering in 2021, as well as garnering praise from critics. Its ratings broke records on both linear and streaming platforms, attracting more than four million lifetime streams by October 2023. The second season averaged a 40% audience share, and its finale was the most-watched programme of the year outside of sport.

In February 2022, the series premiered in the United States and Canada on AMC+, with Sundance Now premiering the series in the UK.

A second series was announced on 10 February 2022, with production beginning in July. Season 2 began airing on 12 March 2023 on RTÉ One and RTÉ Player.

The series was acquired by the BBC and began showing on BBC One and BBC iPlayer on 18 November 2023. The broadcaster also acquired the second series, which was shown on BBC One from 14 February 2024, with the whole series available on BBC iPlayer.

All episodes of Season 1 started streaming on SBS on Demand in August 2023, Australian public broadcaster SBS Television's platform, before being broadcast on linear TV. Both series were shown by SBS.

Kin won an even larger international audience after becoming available on Netflix on 1 May 2024.

The series was put on hold after season 2, after BRON Studios went bankrupt. Discussions were being held about a possible third season, but there had been no announcements by April 2024. The London Standard reported on 20 February 2025 that a third season of Kin had been officially confirmed in October 2024, with filming due to start in Dublin in 2025. However, in May 2025, series star Charlie Cox denied the report of renewal, stating that "I don't believe that that is true. I'd love for that to be the case."

RTÉ confirmed in July 2026 that a third season, produced by Irish company Metropolitan Pictures and House of Juno, was already in production, which would air on RTÉ in 2027.

== Critical reception ==
The review aggregator website Rotten Tomatoes reported a 100% approval rating of season 1, with an average rating of 7.0/10, based on 11 critic reviews in October 2024.

Ed Power in The Irish Times called the show "RTÉ’s best drama in years". Alex McLevy of The A.V. Club gave the series a B− and wrote: "It's simply an opportunity to watch some gifted actors do what they do, very well, with a story that glides along in entertaining but unoriginal manner."
