= List of Britain & Ireland's Next Top Model contestants =

This is a list of contestants who have appeared on the British television show Britain & Ireland's Next Top Model. Contestants compete against each other to become the next British and Irish top model. They are judged by model Abigail Clancy (previously Lisa Butcher, Lisa Snowdon, and Elle Macpherson) and her panel of judges to win a modeling contract with Models 1, a cover and/or spread in a magazine, and a cosmetics campaign. The series first aired in 2005 and as of 2017, there have been twelve "cycles" that have aired. In its twelve years running, twelve models have been crowned Britain's Next Top Model: Lucy Ratcliffe, Lianna Fowler, Lauren McAvoy, Alex Evans, Mecia Simson, Tiffany Pisani, Jade Thompson, Letitia Herod, Lauren Lambert, Chloe Keenan, Olivia Wardell & Ivy Watson.

== Contestants ==
The contestant won the competition
The contestant participated a second time in the 18th cycle of America's Next Top Model, which featured contestants from the US vs the UK.
The contestant competed in a previous cycle of the series

| Name | Age | Hometown | Season | Finish | Reference |
|---|---|---|---|---|---|
| Marina Fallahi | 19 | Cheshire, England | Cycle 1 | 12th | |
| Claire Hillier | 20 | Bridgend, Wales | Cycle 1 | 11th | |
| Shauna Breen | 23 | Derry, England | Cycle 1 | 10th | |
| Anne Kent | 21 | Sheffield, England | Cycle 1 | 9th (quit) | |
| Hayley Wilkins | 19 | West Sussex, England | Cycle 1 | 8th | |
| Marisa Heath | 24 | Surrey, England | Cycle 1 | 7th | |
| Stephanie Jones | 22 | Birmingham, England | Cycle 1 | 6th | |
| Naomi Teal | 22 | Leeds, England | Cycle 1 | 5th | |
| Tashika "Tashi" Brown | 24 | Leeds, England | Cycle 1 | 4th | |
| Jennipher Lee "Jenilee" Harris | 20 | Sittingbourne, England | Cycle 1 | 3rd | |
| Edwina Joseph | 18 | Bristol, England | Cycle 1 | Runner-Up | |
| Lucy Ratcliffe | 20 | Newcastle upon Tyne, England | Cycle 1 | Winner | |
| Yvette Stubbs | 19 | West Sussex, England | Cycle 2 | 13th | |
| Nina Malone | 23 | Cambridge, England | Cycle 2 | 12th | |
| Ashlea "Asha" Hibbert | 20 | York, England | Cycle 2 | 11th | |
| Lucy Flower | 25 | Sheffield, England | Cycle 2 | 10th | |
| Sophia Price | 20 | Hemel Hempstead, England | Cycle 2 | 9th | |
| Samantha Gerrard | 20 | Newport, Wales | Cycle 2 | 8th | |
| Tamar Higgs | 23 | Kent, England | Cycle 2 | 7th/6th | |
| Georgina Edewor-Thorley | 19 | London, England | Cycle 2 | 7th/6th | |
| Sarah Butler | 20 | Surrey, England | Cycle 2 | 5th | |
| Amber Niemann | 19 | Pembrokeshire, Wales | Cycle 2 | 4th | |
| Jasmia Robinson | 18 | London, England | Cycle 2 | 3rd | |
| Abigail Clancy | 20 | Liverpool, England | Cycle 2 | Runner-Up | |
| Lianna Fowler | 18 | Derby, England | Cycle 2 | Winner | |
| Danielle "Dani" Lawrence | 20 | Durham, England | Cycle 3 | 12th | |
| Krystal Hancock | 22 | South Wales, Wales | Cycle 3 | 11th | |
| Abigail Galatia | 19 | Cornwall, England | Cycle 3 | 10th | |
| Natalie Nwagbo | 22 | London, England | Cycle 3 | 9th | |
| Holly Alexander Ritchie | 19 | Glasgow, Scotland | Cycle 3 | 8th | |
| Carly Thompson | 18 | Plymouth, England | Cycle 3 | 7th | |
| Sherece Campbell | 24 | Sheffield, England | Cycle 3 | 6th | |
| Lucy Bennett | 20 | Cheltenham, England | Cycle 3 | 5th | |
| Stefanie Webber | 20 | West Sussex, England | Cycle 3 | 4th | |
| Rebecca White | 19 | Manchester, England | Cycle 3 | 3rd | |
| Louise Watts | 20 | Essex, England | Cycle 3 | Runner-Up | |
| Lauren McAvoy | 20 | Essex, England | Cycle 3 | Winner | |
| Sophie Roberts | 18 | Norfolk, England | Cycle 4 | 14th | |
| Musayeroh Barrie | 20 | London, England | Cycle 4 | 13th | |
| Louise Heywood | 20 | Rochdale, England | Cycle 4 | 12th | |
| Lauren Donaldson-Stanley | 18 | Portsmouth, England | Cycle 4 | 11th | |
| Lindsey "Lynzi" Arnott | 24 | Aldershot, England | Cycle 4 | 10th | |
| Lisa-Jane "Lisa" Fowler | 22 | Potters Bar, England | Cycle 4 | 9th | |
| Martha Braddell | 18 | Oxford, England | Cycle 4 | 8th/7th | |
| Leanne Nagle | 18 | Colchester, England | Cycle 4 | 8th/7th | |
| Aaron Hunt | 18 | Nottingham, England | Cycle 4 | 6th | |
| Charlotte Denton | 20 | Liverpool | Cycle 4 | 5th | |
| Rachael Cairns | 19 | Leeds, England | Cycle 4 | 4th | |
| Stefanie Wilson | 22 | Kingston upon Thames, England | Cycle 4 | 3rd | |
| Catherine Thomas | 18 | Folkestone, England | Cycle 4 | Runner-Up | |
| Alexandra "Alex" Evans | 18 | Cranleigh, England | Cycle 4 | Winner | |
| Lisa-Ann Hillman | 20 | Newquay, England | Cycle 5 | 13th | |
| Lauren Wee | 21 | Coleraine, England | Cycle 5 | 12th | |
| Chloe Cummings | 18 | Liverpool, England | Cycle 5 | 11th/10th | |
| Kasey Wynter | 23 | London, England | Cycle 5 | 11th/10th | |
| Madeleine Wheatley | 18 | Farnham, England | Cycle 5 | 9th | |
| Hayley Buchanan | 21 | Glasgow, Scotland | Cycle 5 | 8th | |
| Annaliese Dayes | 22 | London, England | Cycle 5 | 7th | |
| Daisy Payne | 22 | London, England | Cycle 5 | 6th | |
| Csilla "Viola" Szekely | 18 | Surrey, England^{1} | Cycle 5 | 5th | |
| Ashley Brown | 20 | Livingston, Scotland | Cycle 5 | 4th | |
| Jade McSorley | 20 | Middlesbrough, England | Cycle 5 | 3rd | |
| Sophie Sumner | 18 | Oxford, England | Cycle 5 | Runner-Up | |
| Mecia Simson | 19 | Plymouth, England | Cycle 5 | Winner | |
| Hannah Goodeve | 22 | Cheshire, England | Cycle 6 | 14th (quit) | |
| Rachelle Harry | 20 | Surrey, England | Cycle 6 | 13th | |
| Susan Loughnane | 23 | Dublin, Ireland | Cycle 6 | 12th | |
| Harleen Kaur Nottay | 19 | Glasgow, Scotland | Cycle 6 | 11th | |
| Delita Cole | 18 | Liverpool, England | Cycle 6 | 10th | |
| Amba Hudson-Skye | 20 | Bournemouth, England | Cycle 6 | 9th | |
| Nicola Wright | 20 | Coventry, England | Cycle 6 | 8th | |
| Kirsty Parsons | 21 | Cardiff, Wales | Cycle 6 | 7th | |
| Olivia Oldham-Stevens | 20 | London, England | Cycle 6 | 6th | |
| Amelia Thomas | 22 | Port Talbot, Wales | Cycle 6 | 5th | |
| Charlotte Holmes | 21 | Cornwall, England | Cycle 6 | 4th | |
| Joy McLaren | 20 | London, England | Cycle 6 | 3rd | |
| Alisha White | 18 | London, England | Cycle 6 | Runner-Up | |
| Tiffany Pisani | 18 | Attard, Malta | Cycle 6 | Winner | |
| Kimberleigh Spreadbury | 20 | Surrey, England | Cycle 7 | 13th/12th | |
| Joanne Northey | 19 | Dublin, Ireland | Cycle 7 | 13th/12th | |
| Ufuoma Itoje | 20 | London, England^{2} | Cycle 7 | 11th | |
| Hannah Devane | 21 | Dublin, Ireland | Cycle 7 | 10th | |
| Holly Higgins | 23 | Cardiff, Wales | Cycle 7 | 9th/8th | |
| Amy Woodman | 22 | Norwich, England | Cycle 7 | 9th/8th | |
| Tanya Mihailovic | 23 | Birmingham, England^{3} | Cycle 7 | 7th/6th | |
| Stacey Haskins | 19 | Belfast, Northern Ireland | Cycle 7 | 7th/6th | |
| Jessica Abidde | 23 | London, England | Cycle 7 | 5th | |
| Imogen Leaver | 19 | Southend-on-Sea, England | Cycle 7 | 4th/3rd | |
| Anastasija Bogatirjova | 19 | Reading, England^{4} | Cycle 7 | 4th/3rd | |
| Juste Juozapaityte | 20 | London, England^{5} | Cycle 7 | Runner-Up | |
| Jade Thompson | 20 | Stoke on Trent, England | Cycle 7 | Winner | |
| Amelia Raven | 18 | Leicester, England | Cycle 8 | 14th (quit) | |
| Emma Sharratt | 18 | Newcastle upon Tyne, England | Cycle 8 | 13th | |
| Penelope Williamson | 20 | Leeds, England | Cycle 8 | 12th | |
| Tasmin Golding | 21 | London, England^{6} | Cycle 8 | 11th | |
| Anne Winterburn | 23 | Bedfordshire, England | Cycle 8 | 10th | |
| Kellie Forde | 21 | Cork, Ireland | Cycle 8 | 9th | |
| Jennifer Joint | 19 | Hampshire, England | Cycle 8 | 8th | |
| Madeleine Taga | 20 | London, England^{7} | Cycle 8 | 7th | |
| Roxanne O'Connor | 22 | London, England | Cycle 8 | 6th | |
| Risikat Oyebade | 22 | London, England^{8} | Cycle 8 | 5th | |
| Lisa Madden | 18 | Cork, Ireland | Cycle 8 | 4th | |
| Anita Kaushik | 19 | Southampton, England | Cycle 8 | 3rd | |
| Emma Grattidge | 19 | Swansea, Wales | Cycle 8 | Runner-Up | |
| Letitia Herod | 18 | Surrey, England | Cycle 8 | Winner | |
| Christina Chalk | 19 | Dunblane, Scotland | Cycle 9 | 14th | |
| Danielle Sandhu | 20 | Retford, England | Cycle 9 | 13th | |
| Jessica "Jess" Patterson | 19 | Knocklyon, Dublin, Ireland | Cycle 9 | 12th | |
| Abigail Sakari Johns | 19 | London, England | Cycle 9 | 11th | |
| Laura Young | 19 | Malvern, England | Cycle 9 | 10th | |
| Emily Garner | 18 | Chelmsford, England | Cycle 9 | 9th | |
| Saffron Williams | 19 | Batley, England | Cycle 9 | 8th | |
| Holly Carpenter | 21 | Dublin, Ireland | Cycle 9 | 7th | |
| Angel Mbonu | 18 | Middlesex, England | Cycle 9 | 6th | |
| Naomi Pelkiewicz | 22 | Bristol, England | Cycle 9 | 5th | |
| Sophie Ellson | 19 | Bournemouth, England | Cycle 9 | 4th | |
| Sarah Kennedy | 23 | Donegal, Ireland | Cycle 9 | Runner-Up | |
| Emma Ward | 20 | Leeds, England | Cycle 9 | Runner-Up | |
| Lauren Lambert | 23 | Wallington, Surrey, England^{9} | Cycle 9 | Winner | |
| Jasmine Hodge | 18 | Hampshire, England | Cycle 10 | 12th | |
| Amreen Akhtar | 22 | Yorkshire, England | Cycle 10 | 11th (quit) | |
| Alex Needham | 22 | Sheffield, England | Cycle 10 | 10th | |
| Jenna McMahon | 19 | Liverpool, England | Cycle 10 | 9th | |
| Megan Brunell | 21 | Blackwood, Wales | Cycle 10 | 8th/7th | |
| Georgia Butler | 19 | Norwich, England | Cycle 10 | 8th/7th | |
| Billie Downes | 21 | London, England | Cycle 10 | 6th | |
| Alex "Lexi" Kelly | 18 | Walsall, England | Cycle 10 | 5th | |
| Bethan Sowerby | 19 | Oldham, England | Cycle 10 | 4th | |
| Jessica Workman | 20 | Chester, England | Cycle 10 | Runner-Up | |
| Angel Cole | 19 | London, England | Cycle 10 | Runner-Up | |
| Chloe Keenan | 22 | Llandudno, Wales | Cycle 10 | Winner | |
| Anastasia Ellis | 20 | Crewe, England | Cycle 11 | 12th | |
| Abby Heaton | 19 | Manchester, England | Cycle 11 | 11th | |
| Victoria Clay | 23 | Liverpool, England | Cycle 11 | 10th | |
| Eleanor Sippings | 18 | Colchester, England | Cycle 11 | 9th (quit) | |
| Talulah-Eve Brown | 22 | Birmingham, England | Cycle 11 | 8th | |
| Bianca Thomas | 22 | Lowestoft, England | Cycle 11 | 7th | |
| Chloe Lockley-Middleton | 20 | Huddersfield, England | Cycle 11 | 6th | |
| Simone Murphy | 22 | Edinburgh, Scotland | Cycle 11 | 5th | |
| Tallulah Steed-Fassett | 19 | London, England | Cycle 11 | 4th | |
| Alannah Beirne | 22 | Naas, Ireland | Cycle 11 | 3rd | |
| Jennifer Malengele | 18 | London, England | Cycle 11 | Runner-Up | |
| Olivia Wardell | 18 | Romsey, England | Cycle 11 | Winner | |
| Georgia Mason-Mottram | 18 | Surrey, England | Cycle 12 | 12th | |
| Alisia Grant | 19 | Birmingham, England | Cycle 12 | 11th | |
| Tamsin Hough | 19 | Cornwall, England | Cycle 12 | 10th | |
| Efi Muntoni-Clements | 21 | London, England | Cycle 12 | 9th (quit) | |
| Shaunagh Slattery | 21 | Port Talbot, Wales | Cycle 12 | 8th | |
| Louisa Northcote | 20 | London, England | Cycle 12 | 7th | |
| Martha Miller | 23 | Brighton, England | Cycle 12 | 6th (quit) | |
| Cirrah Leah Webb | 18 | Manchester, England | Cycle 12 | 5th | |
| Sophia Chawki | 20 | Brentwood, England | Cycle 12 | 4th | |
| Kira MacLean | 23 | Nairn, Scotland | Cycle 12 | Runner-Up | |
| Eleanor Sippings | 19 | Colchester, England | Cycle 12 | Runner-Up | |
| Ivy Watson | 22 | Lincoln, England | Cycle 12 | Winner | |

^{1} Originally from Hungary
^{2} Originally from Nigeria
^{3} Originally from Serbia
^{4} Originally from Russia/Latvia
^{5} Originally from Lithuania
^{6} Originally from Jamaica
^{7} Originally from France
^{8} Originally from The Congo/Ukraine
^{9} Originally from St. Lucia

== Notes ==
^1 Contestant's ages are at the time of the season's filming.
