= Ebonee Davis =

American model and activist (born 1992)

- Born: Eboni Davis; November 16, 1992 (age 33); Seattle, Washington, U.S.
- Modeling information
- Height: 1.78 m (5 ft 10 in)
- Hair color: Brown
- Eye color: Brown
- Agency: CAA (New York); LUMIEN Creative (New York); SMG (Seattle) (mother agency)

Eboni Davis (born November 16, 1992), known professionally as Ebonee Davis, is an American model and activist. She appeared in season 18 of America's Next Top Model. She gave a TED Talk on the experience of being an African-American model in the fashion industry. She is known for her Calvin Klein campaign, in which she wore her natural hair.

== America's Next Top Model ==
Davis won one challenge and received one first call-out in week 5. She was also part of a non-elimination bottom four with American contestant Candace Smith, former Britain's Next Top Model, Cycle 6 Runner-Up Alisha White and former Britain's Next Top Model, Cycle 5 contestant Ashley Brown in week 3 after former Britain's Next Top Model, Cycle 3 Runner-Up Louise Watts decided to quit the competition. She also survived a bottom two appearance over American contestant Seymone Cohen-Fobish in week 8 and was eliminated ninth in week 10 where Alisha White who survived also decided to quit the competition immediately in order to accommodate Davis. White was allowed to leave however Davis' elimination decision was final. This resulted in the first time in the show's history that more than one contestant decided to quit during the same season and also the first time where all three remaining contestants (the last American contestant Laura LaFrate and former Britain's Next Top Model, Cycle 5 contestants Annaliese Dayes and Sophie Sumner who eventually won America's Next Top Model, Cycle 18) made it to the next judging without ever appearing in the bottom two at any time throughout the competition.

== Career ==
Davis began her career by going to an open casting call in Seattle, Washington. She starred in season 18 of America's Next Top Model, she was eliminated during the show's tenth episode.

She has since appeared in magazines like Sports Illustrated's Swimsuit Issue, Glamour, Teen Vogue, and Harper's Bazaar UK. She has also been featured in advertisements for Calvin Klein, L'Oreal, Pantene, Urban Outfitters, Victoria's Secret Pink, and GAP. She was also one of the models in Kanye West's Season 4 fashion show.
