= Britain & Ireland's Next Top Model series 7 =

Britain & Ireland's Next Top Model
- Season 7
- Judges: Elle Macpherson; Julien Macdonald; Charley Speed; Grace Woodward
- No. of contestants: 13
- Winner: Jade Thompson
- No. of episodes: 13

Release
- Original network: Sky Living
- Original release: 4 July – 26 September 2011

Season chronology
- ← Previous; Cycle 6 Next → Cycle 8

The seventh cycle of Britain & Ireland's Next Top Model premiered on 4 July 2011 on Sky Living. The show's title was changed from Britain's Next Top Model to Britain and Ireland's Next Top Model, as the show was broadcast in, and auditioned contestants from, the Republic of Ireland as well as the United Kingdom beginning with this cycle. The judging panel from the show's previous cycle remained unchanged.

Cycle 7 auditioned contestants in Glasgow, London, Cardiff, Birmingham, Manchester and Dublin in November and December 2010. This was the first and only installment of the series to feature an audition tour, which was covered in the first three episodes of the cycle. The series re-adopted the traditional casting week format for cycle 8 the following year.

The prizes for this cycle included a modelling contract with Models 1, a fashion spread and cover feature in Company magazine, a contract with Revlon cosmetics, an international fashion campaign for Miss Selfridge, a luxury holiday trip at Sandals Resorts in Jamaica courtesy of British Airways, and a brand new Peugeot RCZ

The winner of the competition was 20-year-old Jade Thompson from Stoke-on-Trent.

Runner-up of this competition Juste Juozapaityte was chosen as one of the 14 contestants in the fifth season of Russia's Next Top Model, in which she once again runner-up.

== Cast ==
=== Contestants ===
(Ages stated are at start of contest)

Contestant	Age	Height	Hometown	Finish	Place
Kimberleigh Spreadbury	20	1.83 m (6 ft 0 in)	Surrey, England	Episode 5	13-12
Joanne Northey	19	1.78 m (5 ft 10 in)	Greystones, Republic of Ireland	Episode 5	13-12
Ufuoma Itoje	20	1.75 m (5 ft 9 in)	London, England	Episode 6	11
Hannah Devane	21	1.78 m (5 ft 10 in)	Dublin, Republic of Ireland	Episode 7	10
Holly Higgins	23	1.80 m (5 ft 11 in)	Cardiff, Wales	Episode 8	9-8
Amy Woodman	22	1.80 m (5 ft 11 in)	Norwich, England	Episode 8	9-8
Tanya Mihailovic	23	1.83 m (6 ft 0 in)	Birmingham, England	Episode 9	7-6
Stacey Haskins	19	1.78 m (5 ft 10 in)	Belfast, Northern Ireland	Episode 9	7-6
Jessica Abidde	23	1.83 m (6 ft 0 in)	London, England	Episode 11	5
Imogen Leaver	19	1.78 m (5 ft 10 in)	Southend-on-Sea, England	Episode 12	4-3
Anastasija Bogatirjova	19	1.80 m (5 ft 11 in)	Reading, England	Episode 12	4-3
Juste Juozapaityte	20	1.83 m (6 ft 0 in)	London, England	Episode 13	2
Jade Thompson	20	1.78 m (5 ft 10 in)	Stoke-on-Trent, England	Episode 13	1

=== Judges ===
- Elle Macpherson (host)
- Julien Macdonald
- Charley Speed
- Grace Woodward

== Episodes ==
No. overall	No. in season	Title	Original release date	UK viewers (millions)
70	1	"Episode 1"	4 July 2011	0.33 (334,000) (Note: Episode viewing figures from BARB)
The judges began the first ever audition tour to find the seventh winner of Britain & Ireland's Next Top Model in Scotland, holding auditions in the city of Glasgow, where Charley Speed scoured the streets for model potential. They later flew to London, and saw the next wave of hopefuls at the Stamford Bridge stadium.
71	2	"Episode 2"	11 July 2011	0.45 (451,000)
The audition tour continued in Wales, where the judges auditioned the next set of hopefuls in Cardiff, and Julian sought out potential in the streets of the city. They later travelled back to England to hold auditions in Birmingham, as the spots in the bootcamp quickly began to dwindle.
72	3	"Episode 3"	18 July 2011	0.35 (351,000)
The judges travelled to Ireland and held auditions in the city of Dublin, where Elle made an excursion to Grafton Street to seek out potential contestsnts. The judges then flew back to England and held auditions at Manchester's Old Trafford stadium, choosing the last of the 85 contestants.: Special guests: Roland Keating, Yvonne Keating
73	4	"Episode 4"	25 July 2011	0.44 (448,000)
The 85 contestants who'd been chosen during the auditions arrived at model boot camp. During their first task the contestants were divided into several groups for a photo shoot meant to test their skills in front of the camera, the results of which were broadcast in real time for the judges in a separate room. Immediately after the session the judges called out the names of the 22 contestants who would be moving on to the next round. The remaining contestants had a black and white color splash photo shoot for Sekonda watches in a confined space where they had to work in pairs. The judges deliberated on the results of the final shoot and later selected the top 12 contestants who would move into the model house, a number which was later expanded to 13 in order to accommodate Ufuoma as an additional contestants.
74	5	"Episode 5"	1 August 2011	0.47 (474,000)
The top 13 moved into the top model house, and later met former model and America's Next Top Model judge Janice Dickinson at the Royal Botanic Gardens for a catwalk training session and challenge in the garden's Treetop Walkway. Tanya was deemed to be the best performer, and was allowed to bring Amy, Jade, and Stacey with her for a shopping spree at Swarovski. The contestants also took part in a mad hatter photo shoot for Lipton Tea where they were tasked with portraying the essence of some of the brand's different flavors. Sophie Ellis-Bextor was introduced as the week's guest judge at panel, and Holly received picture of the week. Anastasija, Joanne, and Kimberleigh landed in the bottom three, and the latter two left the competition in a double elimination.: Special guests: Janice Dickinson, Marie Carrere, Sophie Ellis-Bextor; Featured photographer: Clive Arrowsmith
75	6	"Episode 6"	8 August 2011	0.50 (500,000)
The top 11 contestants received makeovers at the Paul Percival salon, and later had a nude photo shoot for All For Eve bath and beauty products meant to celebrate the female form. On set, concerns were raised by Elle regarding Stacey's low body weight. Back at the house the contestants received a visit from British rapper Chip. Radio and TV resenter George Lamb was introduced as the week's guest judge at panel, where Jessica received picture of the week. Stacey and Ufuoma landed in the bottom two, and Ufuoma was eliminated from the competition.: Special guests: Paul Percival, Liz Hotchin, Chip, George Lamb; Featured photographer: Nihat Odabaşı
76	7	"Episode 7"	15 August 2011	0.48 (487,000)
Elle Macpherson met the top 10 contestants immediately following the previous episode's elimination, and announced that they would be flying to Ireland for their next task. The contestants were introduced to Yvonne Keating at Dublin's Carton House, where they took part in a high-end editorial photo shoot with a falcon on the grounds of the estate. Back in England the contestants were treated to a soiree at the house with some male models from Charley Speed's agency. The contestants later had a styling and runway challenge for Miss Selfridge, where they met supermodel Alek Wek. Juste was chosen as the best performer, and received a rack of clothing from the brand. Designer Jasmine Guinness was introduced as the week's guest judge at panel, where Jade received picture of the week. Amy and Hannah landed in the bottom two, and Hannah was eliminated from the competition.: Special guests: Yvonne Keating, Julian Miachon, Yasmin Yusuf, Alek Wek, Jasmine Guinness; Featured photographer: Barry McCall
77	8	"Episode 8"	22 August 2011	0.45 (456,000)
The top 9 contestants received a visit from presenter Emma Willis and were taken to a recording studio for a challenge in which they had to interview the band members of The Wanted as they tried to test the girls' ability to think on their feet. Anastasija was chosen as the best performer, and was allowed to take Juste and Stacey with her to an evening out with the past three winners of the show. The contestants were later taken to the Royal Opera House for a ballet photo shoot with principal dancers Edward Watson and Federico Bonelli. Designer Henry Holland was introduced as the week's guest judge at panel, where Anastasija received picture of the week. Jade, Amy, and Holly landed in the bottom three, and the latter two left the competition in a double elimination.: Special guests: Emma Willis, The Wanted, Alex Evans, Mecia Simson, Tiffany Pisani, Edward Watson, Federico Bonelli, Henry Holland; Featured photographer: Charlotte Macmillan
78	9	"Episode 9"	29 August 2011	0.53 (537,000)
The top 7 contestants were taken to the Sea Life London Aquarium, and took part in an underwater sea goddess photo shoot for Westwood Rocks jewelry. Due to her fear of the water, Tanya refused to participate in the shoot. After a personal lunch with Elle Macpherson at the Savoy Hotel, the contestants had to cry on command during a black and white beauty shoot with photographer Nicky Johnston. Model and TV personality Katie Price was introduced as the week's guest judge at panel, where Jade received picture of the week. Imogen, Stacey, and Tanya landed in the bottom three, and the latter two left the competition in another double elimination.: Special guests: Lauren Westwood, Rachel Wicks, Katie Price; Featured photographers: Candice Farmer, Nicky Johnston
79	10	"Episode 10"	5 September 2011	0.45 (452,000)
The top five contestants arrived at Holborn Studios and took part in a beauty shoot for Revlon. Jade and Juste were chosen as the best performers during the photo shoot, and were both invited to London Fashion Week as a result. Back at the house the contestants learned that the remainder of the competition would be taking place in Miami. Anastasija's passport was refused during check-in at the airport, and she was unable to board the flight to Miami. Her status in the competition remained unclear throughout the rest of the episode. The other contestants moved into the penthouse suite at the Fontainebleau resort in Miami Beach, and later had a vintage editorial photo shoot for Company magazine with judge Charley Speed at Magic City Farm. Socialite Olivia Palermo was introduced as the week's guest judge at elimination, where the judges revealed that no one would be eliminated from the competition.: Special guests: Carly O'Connor, Paul Percival, Victoria White, Olivia Palermo; Featured photographers: Seb Winter (Revlon shoot), Rony Shram (Company shoot)
80	11	"Episode 11"	12 September 2011	0.53 (532,000)
The top 5 contestants were taken to Telemundo Studios for an acting challenge with Jencarlos Canela in which they had to memorize lines from a script written in Spanish. As the winner of the challenge, Jessica was treated to a pampering session for two at the Fontainebleau spa, which she chose to share with Juste. The models later had a second challenge at the Sun Life Stadium in which they had to memorize and perform a routine with the Miami Dolphins Cheerleaders, which was also won by Jessica. At the end of the week the contestants had a bridal photo shoot for Wedding magazine in the Everglades, where it was revealed that Anastasija would be rejoining them in the competition. Male supermodel Tyson Beckford was introduced as the week's guest judge at panel, where Juste received picture of the week. Anastasija and Jessica landed in the bottom two, and Jessica was eliminated from the competition.: Special guests: Raul Arrieta, Jencarlos Canela, Dorie Grogan, Jenny Swire, Tyson Beckford; Featured photographer: Michael Philnow
81	12	"Episode 12"	19 September 2011	0.40 (400,000)
The top 4 contestants had a go-sees challenge with swimwear designer Red Carter and agents from Next Model Management in Miami. As the winner of the challenge, Jade was allowed to take Imogen with her for a shopping spree at the Aventura Mall valued at US$2,000. The contestants later had a runway show at Nikki Beach with professional models for the monthly fashion series, What Women Want, featuring designs by Ema Koia. On set for the photo shoot, judge Elle Macpherson revealed that only two of the contestants would be taking part in the finale back in London. The models had one final swimwear photo shoot on the beach under the judges' watchful eyes, and at the end of the week, Jade and Juste were chosen as the finalists.: Special guests: Grace Puc, Ron Gerard, Red Carter, Lisa Hollister, Ema Koia; Featured photographer: Joseph Montezinos
82	13	"Episode 13"	26 September 2011	0.52 (524,000)
The finalists were flown back to London and shared an apartment at 51 Buckingham Gate as they prepared to walk in a final runway show for designer Mark Fast. At the venue of the final show, the finalists received training from runway coach J. Alexander. The previously eliminated contestants and family members of the finalists were present at the final judging, and after the final deliberation Jade was crowned as the winner of the competition.: Special guests: J. Alexander, Terry Hart, Mark Fast, Daisy Lowe, Tiffany Pisani, Katy B

== Results ==
Order	Episode								
Order	5	6	7	8	9	10	11	12	13
1	Holly	Jessica	Jade	Anastasija	Jade	Imogen; Jade; Jessica; Juste	Juste	Juste	Jade
2	Juste	Tanya	Stacey	Jessica	Anastasija	Imogen; Jade; Jessica; Juste	Imogen	Jade	Juste
3	Stacey	Holly	Anastasija	Juste	Jessica	Imogen; Jade; Jessica; Juste	Jade	Anastasija; Imogen	
4	Tanya	Juste	Imogen	Imogen	Juste	Imogen; Jade; Jessica; Juste	Anastasija	Anastasija; Imogen	
5	Ufuoma	Hannah	Jessica	Stacey	Imogen	Anastasija	Jessica		
6	Hannah	Anastasija	Juste	Tanya	Stacey; Tanya				
7	Jade	Imogen	Tanya	Jade	Stacey; Tanya				
8	Amy	Jade	Holly	Amy; Holly					
9	Jessica	Amy	Amy	Amy; Holly					
10	Imogen	Stacey	Hannah						
11	Anastasija	Ufuoma							
12	Joanne; Kimberleigh								
13	Joanne; Kimberleigh								

The contestant was eliminated
The contestant was temporarily removed from the competition
The contestant won the competition

- In episode 10, Anastasija was unable to fly to Miami due to issues with her visa. At that weeks judging the remaining four contestants were collectively put through to the next episode. Anastasija rejoined the competition during the photo shoot in episode 11.

=== Average call-out order ===
Episode 4, 10 & 13 are not included.

Rank by average	Place	Model	Call-out total	Number of call-outs	Call-out average
1	2	Juste	21	7	3.00
2	1	Jade	29	7	4.14
3	5	Jessica	25	6	4.17
4	3-4	Anastasija	30	7	4.29
5-7	3-4	Imogen	35	7	5.00
5-7	6-7	Tanya	25	5	5.00
5-7	8-9	Holly	20	4	5.00
8	6-7	Stacey	26	5	5.20
9	10	Hannah	21	3	7.00
10	11	Ufuoma	16	2	8.00
11	8-9	Amy	34	4	8.50
12-13	12-13	Joanne	12	1	12.00
12-13	12-13	Kimberleigh	12	1	12.00

=== Bottom two/three ===
Episode	Contestants	Eliminated
5	Anastasija, Joanne & Kimberleigh	Joanne
5	Anastasija, Joanne & Kimberleigh	Kimberleigh
6	Stacey & Ufuoma	Ufuoma
7	Amy & Hannah	Hannah
8	Amy, Holly & Jade	Amy
8	Amy, Holly & Jade	Holly
9	Imogen, Stacey & Tanya	Stacey
9	Imogen, Stacey & Tanya	Tanya
11	Anastasija & Jessica	Jessica
12	Anastasija, Imogen, Jade & Juste	Anastasija
12	Anastasija, Imogen, Jade & Juste	Imogen
13	Jade & Juste	Juste

The contestant was eliminated after their first time in the bottom two
The contestant was eliminated after their second time in the bottom two
The contestant was eliminated in the semi-final judging and placed third
The contestant was eliminated in the final judging and placed as the runner-up
