= Taking New York =

- Genre: Reality television
- Opening theme: "Change" by Mapei
- Country of origin: United Kingdom
- Original language: English
- No. of series: 1
- No. of episodes: 8 (list of episodes)

Production
- Executive producers: David Clews; Andrew Mackenzie; Sharyn Mills
- Production location: New York City
- Running time: 60 minutes
- Production company: Twofour

Original release
- Network: E4
- Release: 9 February – 30 March 2015

Taking New York is a structured-reality television series broadcast by E4 in the United Kingdom. Taking New York chronicles the lives of a group of twenty-something British friends striving to make their American Dream come true. Featured locations include Brooklyn, Manhattan and Staten Island.

== History ==
The show was first announced following a Channel 4 press release in August 2014. A first series of eight episodes was commissioned by Channel 4’s Head of Formats Dom Bird. The first series began on Monday 9 February 2015.

=== Main cast ===
Cast member	Age	Occupation/role	Series
Amy Purssey	26	Curator/Art Director for a gallery in the Westside of Manhattan	1
Megan Purssey	26	Chinese and Business graduate seeking to launch her career. She graduated from London's SOAS	1
Ben Waddell	28	Model	1
Danny Schwarz	28	Model	1
Gagan Chadha	27	Joint business owner of a printing company and now opening his own bar	1
Georgina Leigh	25	Graduate/Marketing Intern previously worked for Abercrombie & Fitch in Savile Row & stars in the seventeenth series of Big Brother UK	1
Henry Rogers	21	Model and club promoter. He attended Merchant Taylors' School in the UK	1
James Rees	29	Actor	1
Jamie Jewitt	24	Model. Previously worked for Abercrombie & Fitch in Savile Row. Later took part in the third series of Love Island	1
Matt Charles	28	Bar general manager	1
Sophie Pape	28	Special events producer. Previously involved with UK Vogue, ELLE and Harper's BAZAAR.	1
Sophie 'Sumner' Sumner	25	Model/Presenter/Blogger. She won America's Next Top Model, Cycle 18 and was also the runner-up of Britain's Next Top Model, Cycle 5	1
Isabella 'Belle' Orson-Hughes	21	Model and aspiring fashion designer. She attended Southbank University in the UK	1

== Ratings ==
Series	Episodes	Series premiere	Series finale	Average viewers
1	8	9 February 2015	30 March 2015	

These viewing figures are taken from BARB.

== Series ==
=== Series 1 (2015) ===
The reality-series was announced in August 2014. E4 reads "Taking New York is a reality series that follows the lives and loves of a group of British twenty-somethings as they battle to build their American Dream life in The Big Apple". Filming for the series took place between June and September 2014. The first series full-length trailer was revealed on 29 December 2014, six weeks before the official series premiere. The first series of Taking New York began on Monday 9 February 2015 for eight episodes.

== Reception ==
Reviews for the first series were positive, with Radio Times saying, "Taking New York has the glossiness and drama of Made in Chelsea with the likability and comedy of The Only Way Is Essex - and it's silly, fun and completely addictive".

== International broadcast ==
The series premiered in Australia on 21 June 2015 on LifeStyle You.

== See also ==
- The Only Way Is Essex
- Made in Chelsea
- Geordie Shore
- Desperate Scousewives
- The Real Housewives of Cheshire
- Ladies of London
- The Valleys
- Desi Rascals
