= Jasmia Robinson =

British model and singer (born 1987)

- Born: Jasmia Tyshier Robinson; 21 April 1987 (age 39); Hackney, London, England
- Occupations: Model; singer
- Modeling information
- Hair color: Dark Brown
- Eye color: Brown
- Agency: Charles&Ko Model Agency

Jasmia Tyshier Robinson (born 21 April 1987) is a model and singer. Robinson was the last eliminated on the second cycle of Britain's Next Top Model. Robinson has worked with the likes of L’Oreal, Sensationnel and Burberry. Robinson is now developing a music career and writes for NXG Magazine with a regular feature. After that, Robinson joined the eighteenth cycle of America's Next Top Model, but she was eliminated first.

== Early life ==
Robinson was born in Hackney, East London, to a Scottish mother and a father of Jamaican descent. Robinson is the second youngest of 10 siblings. At 4 months old Robinson’s family moved to Highgate, North London, where she attended Ashmount Primary School and went on to Highgate Wood Performing Arts College. Robinson later trained to be a make-up artist at Barnet College, earning a diploma in Theatrical and Media Makeup. She also graduated from Harrow Wheald College completing an Art History course.

== Britain’s Next Top Model Cycle 2 ==
Robinson applied to Living TV’s Britain's Next Top Model, Cycle 2 at 18. In the show Robinson won three tasks the highest amount from all the contestants. She also received two first call-outs and appeared twice in the two bottom two where she survived over Yvette Stubbs and was eliminated when Abbey Clancy survived her second bottom two appearance. She became the last contestant to be eliminated in the competition.

== Modeling ==
In 2010 Robinson featured as one of the models at the 2010 Afro Hair and Beauty Show with the likes of model Annaliese Dayes.

Robinson was also a chosen model at London Fashion Week in 2010 walking for independent designer Georgie W Couture's autumn/winter 2010-2011 collection.

== TV appearances ==
After the Top Model shows, Robinson made TV appearances as a model on programs such as The Friday Night Project as one of rapper Kanye West's "Golden Girls" and on BBC 2's Never Mind the Buzzcocks as Beyoncé.

In 2010 she appeared as an underwear model for Trinny and Susannah on The Alan Titchmarsh Show.

== America's Next Top Model Cycle 18 ==
Robinson, amongst six other past Britain's Next Top Model contestants, appeared on the upcoming cycle of America's Next Top Model Cycle 18: British Invasion, which premiered on 29 February 2012. It involved seven American model hopefuls against seven British all-stars from Britain's Next Top Model. The other girls appearing were Louise Watts of Cycle 3, Catherine Thomas of Cycle 4, Ashley Brown, Annaliese Dayes, and Sophie Sumner all of Cycle 5, and Alisha White of Cycle 6. Robinson was the first to be eliminated in the cycle, because Brown was saved for having a better personality. Robinson placed fourteenth overall in her first-ever bottom two appearance. Tyra noted Robinson wasn't strong on America's Next Top Model but strong on Britain's Next Top Model.

== Campaigns ==
Robinson is currently the face of the UK hair brand Sensationnel. She also took part in the Mayor of London's Barclays Cycle Hire scheme in 2010.

In January 2011 Robinson appeared as a guest speaker at the Inspirational You event celebrating the success of young people.

== Awards ==
In 2009, Robinson was nominated and won the ‘Best Female Model’ category at the Black Entertainment Fashion, Film and Television Awards (BEFFTAS).

== Music ==
In 2010, Robinson began her music career. In 2011, Robinson was amongst the headline acts at Flavour Live, performing her first original single, "Diva Style", and a cover of the song "Ghetto Girl".
