= Britain's Next Top Model series 6 =

Britain's Next Top Model
- Season 6
- Judges: Elle Macpherson; Charley Speed; Grace Woodward; Julien Macdonald
- No. of contestants: 14
- Winner: Tiffany Pisani
- No. of episodes: 14

Release
- Original network: Sky Living
- Original release: 5 July – 4 October 2010

Season chronology
- ← Previous; Series 5 Next → Cycle 7

The sixth cycle of Britain's Next Top Model, premiered on 5 July 2010 on Sky Living. This cycle featured a completely revamped judging panel. Host Lisa Snowdon was replaced by model Elle Macpherson. The new judging panel consisted of fashion designer Julien McDonald, fashion stylist Grace Woodward, and male model Charley Speed.

The prizes for this cycle included a modelling contract with Models 1, a fashion spread and cover feature in Company magazine, and a £100,000 contract with Revlon cosmetics, which included a photo shoot for the company's Colorburst Lipstick and campaigns posing as the face of Revlon's Autumn/Winter 2010 trend collection launching in the UK in November.

The winner of the competition was 18-year-old Tiffany Pisani, from the island country of Malta. Pisani beat fellow contestants Alisha White and Joy Mclaren in a public vote during a live finale, a first for Britain's Next Top Model. She is the first and only non-British winner.

Runner-up Alisha White participated as a contestant on America's Next Top Model Cycle 18 along with six other former BNTM contestants. White quit the competition in the tenth episode explaining that she did not want to take the opportunity away from girls who wanted to be there more than her, and that she had lost her spirit. This marked the first time in ANTM history that more than one contestant decided to quit during the same season as former BNTM Cycle 3 runner-up Louise Watts quit in the third episode initially.

It was revealed that Amelia Thomas was supposed to take part as a contestant on ANTM as the eighth former BNTM Contestant. However, due to stress and other factors, Amelia withdrew before the competition aired.

== Cast ==
=== Contestants ===
(Ages stated are at start of contest)

Contestant	Age	Height	Hometown	Finish	Place
Hannah Goodeve	22	1.83 m (6 ft 0 in)	Cheshire, England	Episode 2	14 (quit)
Rachelle Harry	20	1.78 m (5 ft 10 in)	Surrey, England	Episode 3	13
Susan Loughnane	23	1.73 m (5 ft 8 in)	Malahide, Ireland	Episode 4	12
Harleen Kaur Nottay	19	1.73 m (5 ft 8 in)	Midlothian, Scotland	Episode 4	11
Delita Cole	18	1.73 m (5 ft 8 in)	Liverpool, England	Episode 5	10
Amba Hudson-Skye	20	1.80 m (5 ft 11 in)	Bournemouth, England	Episode 6	9
Nicola Wright	20	1.73 m (5 ft 8 in)	Coventry, England	Episode 7	8
Kirsty Parsons	21	1.73 m (5 ft 8 in)	Cardiff, Wales	Episode 8	7
Olivia Oldham-Stevens	20	1.78 m (5 ft 10 in)	London, England	Episode 9	6
Amelia Thomas	22	1.75 m (5 ft 9 in)	Port Talbot, Wales	Episode 11	5
Charlotte Holmes	21	1.74 m (5 ft 8 1/2 in)	Torpoint, England	Episode 12	4
Joy McLaren	20	1.75 m (5 ft 9 in)	Leeds, England	Episode 14	3
Alisha White	18	1.78 m (5 ft 10 in)	South London, England	Episode 14	2
Tiffany Pisani	18	1.75 m (5 ft 9 in)	Attard, Malta	Episode 14	1

=== Judges ===
- Elle Macpherson (host)
- Charley Speed
- Grace Woodward
- Julien Macdonald

== Episodes ==
No. overall	No. in season	Title	Original release date	UK viewers (millions)
56	1	"Episode 1"	5 July 2010	0.39 (398,000) (Note: Episode viewing figures from BARB)
The 25 contestants arrived to the top model academy and met the new judges before getting their head shots taken, being put to their paces on the catwalk, and meeting the judges for one on one interviews. After an elimination that saw five contestants leave the competition, the top 20 contestants took part in a St Trinian's themed photo shoot session in groups with photographer Nicky Johnston. The judges then deliberated over the final results, and the judges chose the top 14.: Featured photographer: Nicky Johnston
57	2	"Episode 2"	12 July 2010	0.38 (387,000)
The top 14 contestants had a pose off challenge with Charley Speed. The winning group (Alisha, Amba, Harleen, Joy, Nicola, Susan & Tiffany), was given the privilege to enter the top model home first. The contestants later had a runway training session with Julien Macdonald and casting director Sarah Murray wearing golden jumpsuits, for which the best performers, Amelia and Kirsty, were given the chance to walk at London Fashion Weekend. On set for the photo shoot, the girls had to pose with male models in pairs while wearing lingerie. At elimination, Delita and Hannah landed in the bottom two, and Hannah decided to quit the competition.: Featured photographer: Shane Woodward; Special guests: Victoria Holt, Sarah Murray, Rebekah Roy
58	3	"Episode 3"	19 July 2010	0.48 (487,000)
The top 13 contestants arrived at a warehouse to meet Miquita Oliver for a styling challenge, which was won by Amba. As the winner, she was given the chance to steal five minutes from another contestants' photo shoot, which she chose to take from Kirsty. After receiving makeovers, the contestants were photographed in a campaign for Links of London wearing expensive couture jewelry whilst holding a light stick. At elimination, Olivia and Rachelle landed in the bottom two, and Rachelle was eliminated from the competition.: Featured photographer: Pete Pedonomou; Special guests: Miquita Oliver, James Galvin, Louise Galvin, Kim Johnson, Elizabeth Galton, Noemie Lenoir
59	4	"Episode 4"	26 July 2010	0.37 (378,000)
The top 12 contestants arrived to the offices of Models 1, where it was announced that they would be attending castings for several clients. Immediately after the challenge the contestants were met by Grace Woodward and Charley Speed, who announced that the bookers from Models 1 had felt so strongly about Susan's poor performance, that they had decided to eliminate her. The top 11 contestants later had to pose with items from Product Red in a challenge which was won by Alisha, and took part in a photo shoot session for a campaign against abuse and bullying. At elimination, Amelia and Harleen landed in the bottom two, and Harleen was eliminated from the competition.: Featured photographer: Adam Lawrence, David Fairweather; Special guests: Fraser Belk, Julien Miachon, Daniele Sismondi, William Tempest, Seb Bishop, Nicola Roberts, Sherry Adhami

=== Episode 5 ===
Original Airdate: 2 August 2010

The top 10 contestants shot a TV ad for Beyoncé's new fragrance for the challenge. Kirsty won the challenge and a night out and chose Nicola and Amelia to join her. Charlotte seemed disappointed by this, but didn't act upon her disappointment. The contestants had a photo shoot for covered in chocolate with nude for a body product shop campaign. Nicola's photo was the favourite of the company director, thus earning her the first call-out. Delita and Tiffany were announced as the bottom two, Delita for producing her only good photograph, but overall the weakest film, and Tiffany for what seemed to be a lack of versatility. Tiffany's previous strong performances spared her and an unsurprised Delita was sent home.

- Featured photographer: Rhys Frampton
- Special guests: Beyoncé (In a video message), Olivia Fletcher, Dave Berry, Karl Plewka, Lorraine Clough, Rachel Higgin, Rihanna

=== Episode 6 ===
Original Airdate: 9 August 2010

The top 9 contestants arrived in Birmingham to be greeted by R'n'B singer Alesha Dixon with a challenge to sell her latest brand of jewellery live on TV. After an hour of practicing, the contestants were thrown in the deep end and presented on GemsTV. Charlotte was initially nervous but Alesha stated she was a natural, Alisha used her energetic and bubbly personality to sell the products, Tiffany was extremely nervous at first but decided she wanted to smile and focus more on looking friendly than messing up. However, it was Joy who felt the full brunt of presenting on live TV and she sadly succumbed to nervousness and swore twice. The contestants were then taken to Gatwick Airport to be greeted by Grace who gave them £500 each to shop around the airport before they were jetted off to Alicante, Spain for a swimsuit photo shoot. At judging, Amba and Nicola were in the bottom two. In the end, a shocked Amba was eliminated in a very emotional elimination.

- Featured photographer: Javier Galue
- Special guests: Alesha Dixon, Angeline Davies, Melissa Odabash

=== Episode 7 ===
Original Airdate: 16 August 2010

This week the top 8 contestants went to the location and set of Hollyoaks for an acting challenge. Joy won and was given a speaking part in an episode and a night out with two cast members. She chose to take Alisha as well. The main photo shoot was a Horror-based Scream Queens shoot, featuring the contestants in horror situations.

At Panel Most of the contestants excelled, especially Olivia, gaining her first call-out. The judges felt that Nicola's photo was not as strong as her previous photos, even though it was a decent shot, and deemed Amelia's photo as "super fake" and she was told to get real and to not just focus on her beauty at shoots. Despite the comments from the judges that seemed to imply that Amelia would be sent packing, Nicola was eliminated despite having 2 first call-outs. Amelia's levels of versatility, personality and modelling ability seemed to be ignored, a decision that many fans of the show disliked, and Nicola was sent home as she was deemed to be forgettable in the personality department and her photos were declining as the competition progressed.

- Featured photographer: Matthew Brindle
- Special guests: Ricky Whittle, Bronagh Waugh, Hollie-Jay Bowes, Melissa Walton, Kevin Sacre, Paul Marquess, Nathalie Emmanuel, Jessica Fox, Rachel Hardy, Penny Shales, Stuart Russell

=== Episode 8 ===
Original Airdate: 23 August 2010

This week, the top 7 contestants did a challenge on the high street. They had to pick clothes from a store and present them on camera. Charlotte won the challenge for welcoming and friendly presenting skills. The judges of the challenge didn't like Olivia's choice of clothes because they were too revealing and risque.

When they arrived home, they were told they were going to Norway. Once they had arrived they embarked on a helicopter ride to a glacier which they did their photo shoots wearing outfits created from plastic bottles. The best photo would win a campaign with their photo.

At the photo shoot, it was -5 degrees. Alisha and Kirsty worried about the cold. This then led to Alisha struggling with the cold in her photo shoot. Tiffany also struggled with the cold and it proved a big challenge for everyone. the photographer was disappointed with Tiffany who seemed to have the attitude that she wanted to just get it over with.

At panel, Charlotte is told she won the campaign. Tiffany's attitude comes up at panel. Olivia and Joy don't do well. The judges feel Kirsty is constantly producing only amateur photos. The judges thought Alisha's body and her face just weren't working together. Amelia, however, told that her photo was amazing and a very nice bounce back after last week's atrocious photo.

During elimination, Amelia was told she would've been called first if Charlotte had not won the campaign, so she was called second. Alisha and Kirsty find themselves in the bottom two, and a not-so-surprised Kirsty is eliminated.

- Featured photographer: Ole Marius Fossen
- Special guests: Steph Theobold, Charlotte Carey, Peter Krogh, Stephen Jones, Giles Deacon

=== Episode 9 ===
Original Airdate: 30 August 2010

The top 6 contestants have to do a beauty shot for Revlon which piles on the pressure as the show's eventual winner will be given a Revlon campaign. Then the contestants are reaching new heights as they perform in a falling photo shoot for Galaxy Ripple which pushes some contestants, especially Amelia and Olivia, to the limit. After Amelia received injury taking part in the shoot and she called an ambulance, Olivia became scared and could not do the jump, resulting in the decision that she should not take part in the shoot.

At panel, nobody managed to do well on both shoots. Amelia and Charlotte are lauded for strong beauty shot, but their campaign photo weren't amazing, just good. Alisha was praised for perfect beauty shot, but her horrible campaign photo turns the judges down. Tiffany and Joy failed to do well on both shoots, while Olivia didn't do the campaign shoot, her beauty shot was horrible as well. In the end, Alisha shockingly called first, ahead of Amelia and Charlotte, but Tiffany and Olivia find themselves in the bottom two. Tiffany was spared and Olivia was sent home.

- Featured photographer: Hugh O'Malley, Neale Haynes
- Special guests: Sarah Harper, Jim Dowdall

=== Episode 10 ===
Original Airdate: 6 September 2010

The tables turn on the top five contestants when Nicky Johnston sets them a challenge to be the photographer on a shoot based in their model house. Then the contestants have to perform a relaxed yet sexy photo shoot with George Lamb, before being photographed with a rugby team by legendary Terry O'Neill. Amelia, Joy and Tiffany were praised for both their photo's, Alisha managed to produce a phenomenal photo with George Lamp but her wasp shot was considered a miss, Charlotte's wasp shot on the other hand received strong positive criticism but her photo with George Lamp was too commercial, At elimination, Elle says for Charlotte and Joy to both pack their bags, because they (as well as the other three contestants) are going overseas to Malaysia, meaning that no one would be eliminated.

- Featured photographer: Simon Lipman, Terry O'Neill
- Special guests: Nicky Johnston, George Lamb, Victoria White, Kirsty Hathaway

=== Episode 11 ===
Original Airdate: 13 September 2010

The top 5 contestants reach Kuala Lumpur and meet with famous designer Jimmy Choo. They then take part in a dancing challenge, followed by a rooftop photo shoot for Baby G watches. One contestant will be picked to represent the brand following the end of Pixie Lott's contract with the company.

Amelia was told her photo was stunning on its own, but the judges are concerned about her progress during the competition (as she started strong, but then tumbled down until she's getting better and better). Charlotte and Alisha's photo was universally criticized, but Tiffany's photo was heavily praised. Joy received the best feedback, but Amelia and Charlotte ended up in the bottom two again, though both of them produced the two best photos of the week.

Though she has progressed tremendously the past few weeks, Amelia was eliminated.

- Special guests: Jimmy Choo, Datin Azanin Dato' Ahmad, Sarah Earlam, Dato' Sri Dr Ng Yen Yen

=== Episode 12 ===
Original Airdate: 20 September 2010

The top 4 contestants did a commercial for Tourism Malaysia introducing Durian and fish spa. The next day, they have their go-see challenge around Kuala Lumpur meeting three top Malaysian fashion designers. The contestants shot this week's photo shoot in the heart of Bukit Cahaya, the shots will appear in a top high society magazine in Malaysia. Malaysian Fashion Designer Bernard Chandran joins panel this week, Elle announces that the top 3 will be walking in London Fashion Week 2010 in Bernard Chandran's design.

- Featured director: Juan Zainal
- Featured photographer: Allan Casal
- Special guests: Faisol Abdullah, Tom Abang Saufi, Carven Ong, Bernard Chandran

=== Episode 13 ===
Original Airdate: 27 September 2010

The top 3 contestants received an E-mail telling them to pack their bags for the following morning, where they were taken to Pangkor Laut Resort on Pangkor Island. There, they were treated to massages and a sunset cruise before meeting with Elle the next morning. She gave each contestant an iconic photo from her archive which they would have to reproduce for their last photo shoot. Upon returning to Kuala Lumpur, the contestants then had to prepare for their catwalk finale in Dato Bernard Chandran's fashion show. During judging, Elle mentioned that she could not choose and revealed to the contestants that they would be participating in a show-first, a live finale back in Britain.

- Featured photographer: Aaron Lee
- Special guests: Bernard Chandran, Andrew Tan

=== Episode 14: Live Finale ===
Original Airdate: 4 October 2010

The show came to a massive end, as the top 3 contestants took to the final show. There were live performances from McFly, The Saturdays and Tinchy Stryder. After the first round of votes were counted, it was decided that Joy was eliminated.

With Joy now eliminated, the finalists, took to a final, live runway, with alumni of previous cycles Britain's Next Top Model, including Cycle 1, 3, 4 and 5 winners, Lucy Ratcliffe, Lauren McAvoy, Alex Evans and Mecia Simson, as well as Cycle 5 runners-up, Sophie Sumner and Jade McSorley. After this, the final votes were counted, and Tiffany was revealed to be the winner of the competition.

- Special guests: Dave Berry, McFly, The Saturdays, Tinchy Stryder, Lucy Ratcliffe, Lauren McAvoy, Alex Evans, Mecia Simson, Sophie Sumner, Jade McSorley, Sarah Harper

== Results ==
Order	Episode													
Order	1	2 (Note: In episode 2, Hannah quit the competition while she was in the bottom two with Delita. Therefore, no further elimination took place.)	3	4 (Note: In episode 4, Susan was eliminated outside of judging panel for performing the worst in the casting challenge.)	5	6	7	8	9	10	11	12	14	
1	Tiffany	Joy	Nicola	Alisha	Nicola	Charlotte	Olivia	Charlotte	Alisha	Alisha	Joy	Tiffany	Alisha	Tiffany
2	Joy	Amelia	Amba	Charlotte	Charlotte	Olivia	Joy	Amelia	Charlotte	Tiffany	Tiffany	Joy	Tiffany	Alisha
3	Amba	Kirsty	Kirsty	Tiffany	Alisha	Amelia	Tiffany	Joy	Amelia	Amelia	Alisha	Alisha	Joy	
4	Harleen	Harleen	Tiffany	Olivia	Kirsty	Tiffany	Charlotte	Tiffany	Joy	Charlotte; Joy	Charlotte	Charlotte		
5	Charlotte	Charlotte	Charlotte	Nicola	Amba	Alisha	Kirsty	Olivia	Tiffany	Charlotte; Joy	Amelia			
6	Amelia	Amba	Delita	Joy	Olivia	Joy	Alisha	Alisha	Olivia					
7	Rachelle	Susan	Alisha	Delita	Amelia	Kirsty	Amelia	Kirsty						
8	Olivia	Alisha	Susan	Kirsty	Joy	Nicola	Nicola							
9	Hannah	Olivia	Joy	Amba	Tiffany	Amba								
10	Delita	Tiffany	Harleen	Amelia	Delita									
11	Nicola	Nicola	Amelia	Harleen										
12	Kirsty	Rachelle	Olivia	Susan										
13	Alisha	Delita	Rachelle											
14	Susan	Hannah												

The contestant quit the competition
The contestant was eliminated
The contestant was eliminated outside the judging panel
The contestant was part of a non-elimination bottom two
The contestant won the competition

=== Average call-out order ===
Final two is not included.

Rank by average	Place	Model	Call-out total	Number of call-outs	Call-out average
1	4	Charlotte	33	11	3.00
2	2	Alisha	45	12	3.75
3	1	Tiffany	49	12	4.08
4	3	Joy	50	12	4.17
5	7	Kirsty	37	7	5.29
6	5	Amelia	53	10	5.30
7	6	Olivia	45	8	5.63
8	8	Nicola	34	6	5.67
9	9	Amba	31	5	6.20
10	12	Susan	15	2	7.50
11	11	Harleen	25	3	8.33
12	10	Delita	36	4	9.00
13	13	Rachelle	25	2	12.50
14	14	Hannah	14	1	14.00

=== Bottom two ===
Episode	Contestants	Eliminated
2	Delita & Hannah	Hannah
3	Olivia & Rachelle	Rachelle
4	Amelia & Harleen	Harleen
5	Delita & Tiffany	Delita
6	Amba & Nicola	Amba
7	Amelia & Nicola	Nicola
8	Alisha & Kirsty	Kirsty
9	Olivia & Tiffany	Olivia
10	Charlotte & Joy	None
11	Amelia & Charlotte	Amelia
12	Alisha & Charlotte	Charlotte
14	Alisha, Joy & Tiffany	Joy
14	Alisha & Tiffany	Alisha

The contestant was eliminated after her first time in the bottom two
The contestant was eliminated after her second time in the bottom two
The contestant was eliminated after her third time in the bottom two
The contestant quit the competition
The contestant was eliminated in the final judging and placed third
The contestant was eliminated in the final judging and placed as the runner-up

== Ratings ==
Episode Viewing figures from BARB

Episode	Date	Total Viewers	Living Weekly Ranking
1	5 July 2010	398,000	3
2	12 July 2010	387,000	3
3	19 July 2010	487,000	1
4	26 July 2010	378,000	2
5	2 August 2010	429,000	2
6	9 August 2010	365,000	3
7	16 August 2010	449,000	2
8	23 August 2010	364,000	2
9	30 August 2010	432,000	2
10	6 September 2010	463,000	2
11	13 September 2010	346,000	2
12	20 September 2010	346,000	2
13	27 September 2010	373,000	2
14	4 October 2010	419,000	1
