= Britain's Next Top Model series 5 =

Season of television series

Britain's Next Top Model
- Season 5
- Series 5 cast
- Judges: Lisa Snowdon; Huggy Ragnarsson; Louis Mariette
- No. of contestants: 13
- Winner: Mecia Simson
- No. of episodes: 13

Release
- Original network: Living
- Original release: 20 April – 6 July 2009

Series chronology
- ← Previous; Series 4 Next → Series 6

Series 5 of Britain's Next Top Model premiered on Sky Living on 20 April 2009. The series introduced several changes to the show's format. Lisa Snowdon and Huggy Ragnarsson returned as judges, while head garment designer Louis Mariette joined the panel, replacing Gerry DeVeaux. This marked Lisa Snowdon's final season as host, with model Elle Macpherson taking over in series 6 the following year.

This was the first series to include a casting episode, featuring 20 semi-finalists—the largest number of contestants since the show's inception in 2005. Seven were eliminated in the premiere, and the remaining 13 finalists moved into the Top Model house in London.

The series was won by 19-year-old Mecia Simson from Plymouth. Her prizes included a contract with Models 1, a campaign for Max Factor cosmetics, and a cover and six-page editorial in Company Magazine.

Runner-up Sophie Sumner, along with fellow contestants Annaliese Dayes and Ashley Brown, later competed on America's Next Top Model: British Invasion, alongside four other former Britain's Next Top Model contestants. Brown and Dayes were eliminated in episodes 5 and 11, respectively, while Sumner went on to win the competition.

== Cast ==
=== Contestants ===
Contestant	Age	Height	Hometown	Finish	Place
Lisa-Ann Hillman	20	1.75 m (5 ft 9 in)	Newquay, England	Episode 2	13
Lauren Wee	21	1.74 m (5 ft 8 1/2 in)	Coleraine, Northern Ireland	Episode 4	12
Chloe Cummings	18	1.73 m (5 ft 8 in)	Liverpool, England	Episode 5	11–10
Kasey Wynter	23	1.80 m (5 ft 11 in)	London, England	Episode 5	11–10
Madeleine Wheatley	18	1.72 m (5 ft 7 1/2 in)	Farnham, England	Episode 6	9
Hayley Buchanan	21	1.79 m (5 ft 10 1/2 in)	East Dunbartonshire, Scotland	Episode 7	8
Annaliese Dayes	22	1.70 m (5 ft 7 in)	Hackney, England	Episode 8	7
Daisy Payne	22	1.80 m (5 ft 11 in)	London, England	Episode 9	6
Csilla 'Viola' Szekely	18	1.78 m (5 ft 10 in)	Surrey, England	Episode 10	5
Ashley Brown	20	1.73 m (5 ft 8 in)	Livingston, Scotland	Episode 11	4
Jade McSorley	20	1.73 m (5 ft 8 in)	Middlesbrough, England	Episode 12	3
Sophie Sumner	18	1.75 m (5 ft 9 in)	Oxford, England	Episode 13	2
Mecia Simson	19	1.75 m (5 ft 9 in)	Plymouth, England	Episode 13	1

=== Judges ===
- Lisa Snowdon
- Huggy Ragnarsson
- Louis Mariette

== Episodes ==
No. overall	No. in season	Title	Original release date
43	1	"The Girls Go To Boot Camp"	20 April 2009
The top twenty contestants arrived at a countryside manor before being whisked off to a gruelling model boot camp for a series of assault courses at Henfold Lakes Dorking. Following an Ed Hardy runway challenge and subsequent elimination, the top fifteen contestants participated in an army-inspired photoshoot challenge, photographed by judge Huggy Ragnarsson. At the end of the week, the judges selected the top thirteen contestants.: Featured photographer: Huggy Ragnarsson
44	2	"Quizzes and Castings"	27 April 2009
The top 13 contestants moved into their new home and were divided into teams for a fashion quiz, competing to win a set of designer watches. They later took part in a film advert challenge at Millennium Bridge wearing Elizabeth Emanuel bridal wear where they were required to kiss a male model, with Kasey being chosen as the winner. The models also met J. Alexander for a runway lesson, before ending their week with a nude mango bath photoshoot session for Simple Cosmetics. At elimination, Sophie and Lisa-Ann landed in the bottom two, and Lisa-Ann was eliminated from the competition.: Featured photographer: Chris Bissell; Special guests: Simon Withington, Elizabeth Emanuel, J. Alexander, Lloyd Nwagboso, Rachel Snary
45	3	"Re-style and Rhythm"	4 May 2009
After a heated exchange between Annaliese and Chloe, the top 12 contestants were taken to the Daniel Galvin salon for a round of makeovers, where Viola was selected to star in the salon's 50th anniversary ad campaign. For the weekly challenge the contestants had to perform a dance routine in groups of four at London's Movida nightclub, with the winning group (Ashley, Daisy, Hayley, & Kasey) being treated to a night out. On set at the photoshoot, the contestants were paired up for a grunge sapphic themed session at an underground carpark. At elimination, Ashley and Chloe landed in the bottom two, but were both allowed to remain in the competition.: Featured photographer: Nicky Johnston; Special guests: James Galvin, Louise Galvin, Jaime Karitzis, Daniele Sismondi, Alex Evans, Leanne Nagle, Rachael Cairns
46	4	"Charity"	11 May 2009
Featured photographer: Matthew Brindle; Special guests: Johnny Vaughan, Jo Wood, Leah Wood (in video message), Lina El-Solh, Robbie LeBlanc, Claire Everett, Alison Walsh
47	5	"Kylie Couture"	18 May 2009
Featured photographer: Johnny Blue-Eyes; Special guests: Belinda White, Louise Redknapp, Hilary Alexander, Kylie Minogue (in video messages), Rachel Hardy, Giles Pearson
48	6	"Ice Queens"	25 May 2009
Featured photographer: Huggy Ragnarsson; Special guests: Andrea Brabin
49	7	"Sink or Swim"	1 June 2009
Featured photographer: Michele Civelli (challenge), Zena Holloway (photo shoot); Special guests: Alistair Monteith, Ruth Ross, Debbie Gething
50	8	"Surprise Casting"	8 June 2009
Featured photographer: Rachel Joseph; Special guests: Fraser Belk, Abigail Clancy, Caroline Copsey, Julia Anderton, Eira Ellis, Pearl Lowe, Dahlia Schaeffer
51	9	"Face, Face, Face"	15 June 2009
Featured photographer: Diana Gomez (Company photo shoot), Terry O'Neill (Kate Moss photo shoot); Special guests: Sarah Cumming, Brendan Cole, The Script, Victoria White
52	10	"Time to Tango"	22 June 2009
Featured photographer: Rachel Joseph; Special guests: Ignacio Archain, Ivan Valdivizzo, Caroline Reynolds, Beltran Zuberbuhler
53	11	"Latino Dancing and Latino Loving"	29 June 2009
Featured photographer: Candelaria Gil; Special guests: Benito Fernandez, Pablo Ramirez, Jimena Nahon, Ivan Valdivizzo, Ginette Reynal, Belén Vińas
54	12	"The Finale is Coming"	6 July 2009
Featured photographer: Huggy Ragnarsson
55	13	"Finale"	6 July 2009
Special guests: Fraser Belk, Rosie Huntington-Whiteley, Peaches Geldof, Sara Nathan, Jodie Kidd, Abigail Clancy, Lee Lapthorne, Percy Parker, Amy Molyneux

== Results ==
Order	Episodes												
Order	1 (Note: In episode 1, the pool of 20 semifinalists was reduced to 13 contestants who moved on to the main competition.)	2	3 (Note: In episode 3, Ashley and Chloe landed in the bottom two, but neither of them was eliminated.)	4	5 (Note: In episode 5, Chloe and Kasey were both eliminated whilst in the bottom two.)	6 (Note: In episode 6, Daisy was exempt from elimination.)	7	8	9	10	11	12	13
1	Mecia	Kasey	Kasey	Sophie	Jade	Daisy	Jade	Mecia	Jade	Sophie	Jade	Sophie	Mecia
2	Viola	Daisy	Jade	Jade	Daisy	Jade	Viola	Viola	Viola	Jade	Sophie	Mecia	Sophie
3	Hayley	Mecia	Daisy	Ashley	Annaliese	Mecia	Ashley	Jade	Sophie	Mecia	Mecia	Jade	
4	Kasey	Hayley	Lauren	Daisy	Mecia	Hayley	Sophie	Ashley	Mecia	Ashley	Ashley		
5	Lauren	Annaliese	Hayley	Viola	Ashley	Ashley	Annaliese	Daisy	Ashley	Viola			
6	Madeleine	Ashley	Viola	Madeleine	Madeleine	Sophie	Mecia	Sophie	Daisy				
7	Annaliese	Viola	Madeleine	Chloe	Hayley	Viola	Daisy	Annaliese					
8	Jade	Jade	Annaliese	Hayley	Sophie	Annaliese	Hayley						
9	Chloe	Lauren	Mecia	Annaliese	Viola	Madeleine							
10	Sophie	Madeleine	Sophie	Mecia	Chloe; Kasey								
11	Lisa-Ann	Chloe	Ashley; Chloe	Kasey	Chloe; Kasey								
12	Daisy	Sophie	Ashley; Chloe	Lauren									
13	Ashley	Lisa-Ann											

The contestant was eliminated
The contestant was part of a non-elimination bottom two
The contestant was exempt from elimination
The contestant won the competition

== Post–Top Model careers ==
- Lisa-Ann Hillman took a number of test shots and appeared in a magazine editorial for Cornwall Wed September 2010. She also modeled for Finisterre, Kernow Clothing, D'Lacey Design, Seasalt Cornwall, Uneeka, Louis Mariette, County Cream Bridal House, and walked the runways for Phase Eight, Nichole de Carle, Louis Mariette, Bishop Phillpott, and Goldwell Hair Show 2010. She retired from modeling in 2011.
- Lauren Wee took a number of test shots, before retiring from modeling in 2010.
- Chloe Cummings walked for several shows during Liverpool Fashion Week. She appeared in magazine editorials for Loaded April 2012, Love SS13, and FHM March 2013. Besides modeling, she was also one of the main cast of the reality show Desperate Scousewives. Cummings retired from modeling in 2014.
- Kasey Wynter took a number of test shots, and walked the runway for Holly Jade O'Leary SS19. Besides modeling, she also competed on Love Island in 2016. She retired from modeling in 2020.
- Madeleine Wheatley signed with Mot Models. She took a number of test shots and modeled for Rimmel. She retired from modeling in 2012.
- Hayley Buchanan signed with Model Team Glasgow, Colours Model & Talent Agency, Industry Model Management and Bareface Model Agency in Dubai. She took a number of test shots and modeled for Adidas, Boudiche Buoutique, Luca Carati Jewellery, Rox Jewellery, Synsam Norway, Tombo Clothing, Buchanan Galleries, Ness Clothing, and St. Enoch Centre Summer 2017. She has appeared on magazine covers and editorials in Sunday Herald Life, Marie Claire China, Tie the Knot Scotland October–November 2014, The Herald May 2016, Trend Aberdeen October–November 2016, and walked the runway for Swarovski, Pam Hogg, Jenny Packham, Roksanda Ilinčić, Monsoon Accessorize, Brambles, Bibbidi Bobbidi Boo Bridal Boutique, Harvey Nichols SS15, Opus Atelier, Jane Davidson, Joyce Young, Tarik Ediz, Tiger Lily Boutique, Blues & Browns, Mirka Bridal Couture, and Kavelle Couture.
- Annaliese Dayes signed with Oxygen Model Management, Mot Models, Zone Models, Milk Model Management and RCM Talent. She has modeled for Pond's, Olay, Cath Kidston, H&M, Figleaves, Very, Boohoo, No. 7, Avon South Africa, Frills By AD SS14, B. Cosmetics Superdrug, Gold Collagen, Peacocks Fall 2015, Pep & Co, MUA Cosmetics SS19, The Good Stuff Hair, Soap & Glory Cosmetics, Next Home UK, Smirnoff, and Strictly Come Dancing. She has walked the runway for Monsoon Accessorize, Nichole de Carle, Louis Mariette, Derek Lawlor SS10, Triarchy SS12, Travis Taddeo SS12, Anndra Neen, Siki Im, Giulietta by Sofia Sizzi, Julian Louie, Jaeger London, and LBM Designs St. Lucia. She has taken a number of test shot and appeared on magazine covers and editorials for Pride, Woman & Home, Black Beauty & Hair, Blackhair, The Guardian August 2012, Fashion Affair US February 2013, Flavour March 2013, 2Nite St. Lucia #21 March 2013, Woman April 2013, We Are Collision April 2013, The Star St. Lucia May 2013, TYD September 2013, She Caribbean #62 Winter 2013–2014, Health & Beauty July 2014, Wired UK March 2015, Cosmopolitan April 2016, Specsavers FW18, Fabulous January 2019, Boyfriend #5 May 2019, and Rock n Roll Bride #49 March 2023. Besides modeling, Dayes also competed on season 18 o America's Next Top Model and also worked as a presenter for several radio stations and fashion events in the United Kingdom, including Kiss 100, Heart, Clothes Show Live, and QVC.
- Daisy Payne signed with M+P Models. She appeared in a magazine editorials for Marie Claire in May 2016, and walked the runway for Jasper Garvida SS10. She retired from modeling in 2017.
- Viola Szekely took a number of test shots and walked the runway for Jasper Garvida SS10. She retired from modeling in 2011.
- Ashley Brown signed with Superior Model Management and Model Team Glasgow. She took a number of test shots and modeled for Rebel Nails, Delicious Dresses, Hush Hair & Beauty Summer 2011, and Kingsfield Golf Center. Besides modeling, she competed on season 18 of America's Next Top Model, and is also the owner of Ashley Brown Esteem Model School. She retired from modeling in 2016.
- Jade McSorley signed with Models 1, Established Models, Blow Models, Nevs Models, Priscillas Model Management in Sydney, Bravo Models in Tokyo, Photogenics Media in Los Angeles, Premium Models in Paris, Touché Models in Amsterdam, Core Artist Management in Hamburg, Metro Models in Zurich, Joy Model Management & Monster Management in Milan, One Management & Muse Management in New York City. She has taken a couple of test shot and modeled for Stella McCartney, Diesel, Fred Perry, Asos, Boots, House of Fraser, Pull&Bear, The Body Shop, Very, Topshop, Westfield Group, Burt's Bees, Bruno Banani, Justine Tabak, Swatch SS10, Hasan Hejazi FW10, Austique London, My Wardrobe HQ, Tallulah Love, Primark SS11, Urban Outfitters Fall 2012, San Marina Shoes FW12, Gap SS13, Rachel Entwistle SS14, Jack Wills Fall 2014, Ron Herman Japan, Urban Research Japan, Beams Japan SS15, Emmi Japan SS15, Taro Horiuchi Pre-Fall 2015, Blindreason Jewelry, Lodovico Zordanazzo SS16, Carlo Rino SS16, Glasshouse Salon, Bizzbee, Dadie Clayton SS18, Rebelle, The Modist, B&C Collection, Coggles FW19, Retold Vintage. She has walked the runway for John Lewis, Jasper Garvida SS10, Danny Tang FW10, Phoebe English SS12, Krystof Strozyna FW11.12, Tome NYC Pre-Fall 2015, Sadie Clayton SS16, and appeared in magazine covers and editorials for Fabulous, Jan Netherlands, Elle Netherlands, Elle Girl Japan, Compônere #3 April 2010, Fiasco July 2010, Used FW11, Grazia Italia February 2012, As You Are #14 May 2012, Nylon August 2012, Purple France #18 FW12, ContentMode #8 Fall 2012, Volt US September 2012, Gioia Italia #35 September 2013, VS Denmark September 2013, Neon Germany April 2014, You UK June 2014, L'Officiel Ukraine August 2014, Teeth US October 2014, Creem US January 2015, Ginza Japan March 2015, Irish Tatler July 2015, Sicky US September 2015, Allegra Germany May 2016, J’N’C Germany June 2016, Mojeh UAE August 2017, Twenty6 December 2017, Turnt Germany #5 Summer 2018, and Commons & Sense March 2020. Besides modeling, McSorley is also the co-founder of the clothing line Loanhood.
- Sophie Sumner signed with Storm Management, Next Management, Look Models International in Vienna, LA Models in Los Angeles, Q Model Management & New York Model Management in New York City. She has taken a couple of test shots and walked the runway of Jasper Garvida SS10, Pink Tartan SS12, UNTTLD SS12, Triarchy SS12, Travis Taddeo SS12, Attitude Jay Manuel SS12, Anndra Neen, Siki Im, Giulietta by Sofia Sizzi, Julian Louie, Thomas Wee SS13, OwnMuse SS13, Frederick Lee, Bench Philippines. She has modeled for People Tree, Puma, Hodinkee, Bench Philippines, Rimmel US, Target, Juicy Couture, Krewe US, Mayors Jewelers, Revolve US, Headmasters UK, Lizzie McQuade, Derek Lawlor FW10, Paul Edmonds FW11, Me + Em, Rush Hair & Beauty, Marisa Zeman SS13, Charriol Philippines SS13, Catherine André SS13, Slices Scarves SS13, Knight$ of New York Jewelry, Pandora Philippines, Rafe New York SS18, Minnie Rose Cashmere, Scarselli Diamonds US, Manila Hotel Philippines, and appeared on magazine cover and editorials for Vogue Italia, Daily Front Row US, Fabulous, Meg Philippines, Fellowshiphair July 2010, Ozon Greece September 2010, Woman Austria July 2011, Creative Head September 2011, Marie Claire Czech September 2011, Compônere #10 December 2011-April 2012, People US June 2012, Moda! Woman June 2012, British Vogue November 2012, Beauty In Vogue Italia May 2013, Bello US #49 August 2013, Manila Bulletin Style Weekend Philippines October 2014, Mega Philippines December 2014, L'Officiel Hommes China December 2014, The Glass FW16, Viral Fashion US Fall 2016, VMSD US April 2017, Elléments US October 2017, Jez US #4 November 2020. Besides modeling, Sumner has competed and won America's Next Top Model season 18, also one of the main cast of the reality show Taking New York and is currently the host of Amazon Live.
- Mecia Simson has collected her prizes and signed with Models 1. She is also signed with Wilhelmina Models, Nevs Models, Milk Model Management, Established Models, Base Model Agency in Cape Town and Q Model Management in New York City. She has taken a couple of test shots and modeled for Max Factor, Stella McCartney, Argos, Wrangler, Reebok, Sears, Debenhams, Sweaty Betty, Apricot Clothing, Markham South Africa, Xinnatex US SS13, Glassworks London, Illustrated People, Fremlin Walk Autumn 2015, Souluxe, Illamasqua, Cefinn SS18, LSahaSS20, Vodafone. Simson has walked the runway of Stella McCartney, David's Bridal, House of Blueeyes, Derek Lawlor SS10, Staci Sherrí SS13, Anna Francesca SS13, Designer's Collective SS13, Tahir Sultan FW13.14, Vicedomini, Kristina Viirpalu, and appeared on magazine cover and editorials for InStyle, Marie Claire South Africa, Company August 2009, Your Hair #104 April 2010, Inspired UK SS10, More!, Six UK June 2012, Women's Health December 2012, Viya March 2013, Mixmag November 2013, Men's Health December 2013, OK! February 2014, The Sun March 2014, BLVD Kazakhstan August 2015, Marie Claire September 2015, Revamp June 2023, Wonderland June 2023, Country & Town House June 2023. Besides modeling, she is also competed on Model Turned Superstar, appeared in several music videos such as "Oh My Goodness" by Olly Murs, "Criminal" by Vox Halo ft. LaDolla, "Pushing It" by The Family Rain, and also pursuing an acting career which she played Francesca Findabair in The Witcher.

== Viewership ==
Episode viewing figures retrieved from the Broadcasters Audience Research Board.

Episode	Date	Total viewers	Ranking
1	20 April 2009	247,000	4
2	27 April 2009	295,000	3
3	4 May 2009	365,000	2
4	11 May 2009	104,000	10
5	18 May 2009	268,000	4
6	25 May 2009	167,000	5
7	1 June 2009	276,000	4
8	8 June 2009	285,000	4
9	15 June 2009	363,000	5
10	22 June 2009	327,000	6
11	29 June 2009	328,000	4
12	6 July 2009 (20:00)	274,000	5
13	6 July 2009 (22:00)	393,000	2
