= Sophie Sumner =

English model

- Born: 15 January 1990 (age 36); Oxford, England
- Education: Teesside University
- Occupations: Fashion model; actress
- Modeling information
- Height: 5 ft 9 in (1.75 m)
- Hair color: Blonde
- Eye color: Blue
- Agency: Storm Models; LA Models; New York Model Management; UTA; Artists First
- Website: sophiesumner.com

Sophie Sumner (born 15 January 1990) is an English fashion model and actress. She is best known for winning cycle 18 of America's Next Top Model and previously the runner-up of cycle 5 of Britain's Next Top Model.

== Early life ==
Sumner was born and raised in Oxford. She attended school at Cherwell School, the Manor Preparatory, and Headington School, a private day and boarding school for girls. Sumner had plans to complete a degree at Teesside University, but decided to defer her studies after successfully auditioning for Britain's Next Top Model.

== Career ==
=== Britain's Next Top Model Cycle 5 ===
Sumner was the tenth contestant selected for the top thirteen on Britain's Next Top Model Cycle 5. Over her stay, Sumner received three first call-outs and survived two bottom two appearances over Lisa-Ann Hillman and eventual America's Next Top Model Cycle 18: British Invasion contestant, Annaliese Dayes. She was placed as the runner-up in the finale where Mecia Simson won.

=== Britain's Next Top Model Cycle 6 ===
With Joy McLaren eliminated, Sumner appeared in the season finale of Britain's Next Top Model Cycle 6 with fellow contestant Jade McSorley and previous winners, Lucy Ratcliffe, Lauren McAvoy, Alex Evans and Mecia Simson from Britain's Next Top Model Cycles 1, 3, 4 and 5, respectively, to participate in the final runway show with Tiffany Pisani who later won the series and eventual runner up and America's Next Top Model Cycle 18: British Invasion contestant, Alisha White.

=== Winning America's Next Top Model Cycle 18: British Invasion ===
America's Next Top Model Cycle 18: British Invasion premiered on 29 February 2012. It involved seven US contestants hopefuls against seven British all-star contestants from Britain's Next Top Model. Sumner was chosen as one of the seven British All-Star contestants to compete, including both her former fellow Cycle 5 contestants Annaliese Dayes who was the seventh contestant eliminated and Ashley Brown who was the tenth contestant eliminated. The other Britain's Next Top Model contestants appearing were last contestant eliminated Jasmia Robinson of Cycle 2 and Louise Watts, Catherine Thomas and Alisha White from Cycles 3, 4 and 6, respectively, who all runner-up.

The judges said of her personality that it "lit up a room", leading to Sumner being labeled "Illuminata" by Tyra Banks herself. Over her stay, Sumner won three challenges and received two first call-outs. In the final judging, the judges selected Sumner over the runner-up Laura LaFrate from America. Sumner became the fifth winner to have never appeared in the bottom two during her time on America’s Top Model.

Sumner became the first-ever foreign winner of America's Next Top Model.

=== After Top Model ===
Sumner released a single entitled "Aiming For You" on iTunes and her photos for Vogue Italia are featured in the August 2012 issue. She has made billboard advertisements for CoverGirl and for the America's Next Top Model perfume, Dream Come True. She is active in raising funds for Breast Cancer Research with the help of her pink dog, Darcy.

In 2012, Sumner appeared as Deepika Padukone's friend in the Bollywood film Cocktail, including dancing sequences. Sumner, along with co-stars Allison Harvard and Dominique Reighard, was featured and walked in the 25th anniversary of Bench Universe Denim and Underwear Show in September 2012. In December of the same year, she was a covergirl for MEG Magazine for their December 2012/January 2013 issue. She also attended a fashion show in Montego Bay for Cycle 19 with the contestants.

In 2013, Sumner opened the runway and wore the designs of Singaporean designer Frederick Lee during the finale of Asia's Next Top Model, Cycle 1. In 2015, Sumner starred as "Summer" in the reality TV show Taking New York on E4. In October 2016, Sumner was guest judge in the coronation night of Miss Earth 2016, in the Mall of Asia Arena, Pasay, Metro Manila, Philippines.

In 2023, Sumner made her big screen acting debut in Killington, a dark comedy/horror film by Matt Vita and Mark Dudzinski, co-directed by Frank Perz. The film was released in 2024.

Preceded by Lisa D'Amato	America's Next Top Model winner Cycle 18 (2012)	Succeeded by Laura James
