= Rachael Cairns =

British model and actress

- Born: 11 August 1988 (age 38); Leeds, Yorkshire, United Kingdom
- Other name: Rachael St. Rose
- Occupations: Model; actress; podcaster
- Modelling information
- Height: 5 ft 9 in (1.75 m)
- Hair colour: Dark brown
- Eye colour: Blue
- Agency: Nevs
- Website: rachelcairns.ca

Rachael Cairns (born 11 August 1988) is an English model, actress and podcaster. She is known for participating in the fourth series of Britain's Next Top Model, in which she became the eleventh eliminated. She also appeared in Doctors as Emily Fenton, as well as an episode of Waterloo Road as Tasha Lefton. Since 2022, she has hosted the podcast Aborsh.

== Career ==
In 2008, Cairns was announced as one of the fourteen girls who participated in the fourth series of Britain's Next Top Model. During her run in the competition, she accumulated 3 first call-outs, tying with eventual winner Alex Evans, and one bottom two appearance. After landing in the bottom two with eventual last eliminated contestant Stefanie Wilson, the judges decided to send her home.

Cairns was then signed to Models 1 in London after appearing on the show, being the first non-winning Britain's Next Top Model contestant to be signed by the prize agency. A year later, she had left Models 1 and joined Nevs, another agency based in London. She also appeared on ITV2's The Fashion Show along with Britain's Next Top Model, Cycle 3 winner, Lauren McAvoy, and walked for Graeme Black at London Fashion Week. In 2006, she appeared in the recurring role of Emily Fenton on the BBC soap opera Doctors. She then made an appearance in Series 4, Episode 17 of Waterloo Road as disruptive pupil, Tasha Lefton, which was aired on 29 April 2009 on BBC1.

== Filmography ==
Year	Title	Role	Notes
2006	Casualty	Amy Harkins	Episode: "A Problem Halved"
2006	Robin Hood	Eleri	Episode: "Brothers in Arms"
2006	Past Sins	Gloria Bradford	
2006	Doctors	Emily Fenton	Recurring role
2008	Britain's Next Top Model	Herself	Contestant - Cycle 4
2009	Waterloo Road	Tasha Lefton	1 episode
2013	Filthy Betrayal	Adeline Durkheim	
