= Henfold Lakes =

Group of lakes in Surrey, England

Henfold Lakes are a series of small lakes with adjoining trees and meadows, covering 95 acres (38 ha) of Surrey countryside. The barraged lakes of hill-draining streams rising less than 2 miles (3.2 km) west, they are on the boundary of the parishes of Holmwood and Newdigate in the south of Mole Valley. The lakes have been nurtured to be a prime habitat for carp, bream, crucian, roach and golden tench. The maximum depth is seven feet.

The leisure park is centred 3 miles (4.8 km) south south-east of Dorking, Surrey. The site abuts Brook Copse on its north eastern corner and has fishing through five lakes, joined by weirs and an interconnecting stream, and a touring caravan site. Outdoor pursuits at Henfold Lakes include coarse fishing, barbecues, bonfires, camping, falconry and cycling stop-overs.

Henfold Lakes In The Early Afternoon

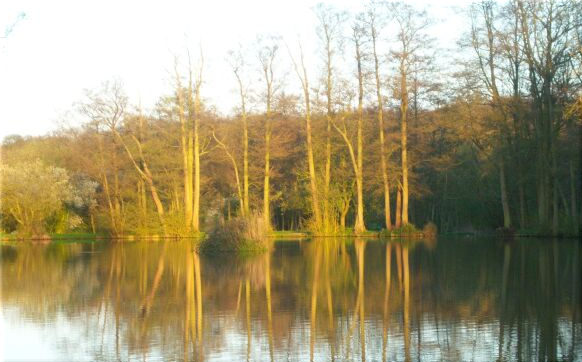
Henfold Lakes In The Morning
