= Phase Eight =

British womenswear brand

- Company type: Private limited company
- Industry: Apparel stores
- Founded: Wandsworth (1979)
- Successor: Foschini Group
- Headquarters: London, United Kingdom
- Area served: United Kingdom; Ireland; Switzerland; Germany; Sweden; Australia; UAE
- Products: Women's clothing Women's accessories Women's shoes
- Owner: Foschini Group
- Website: www.phase-eight.com

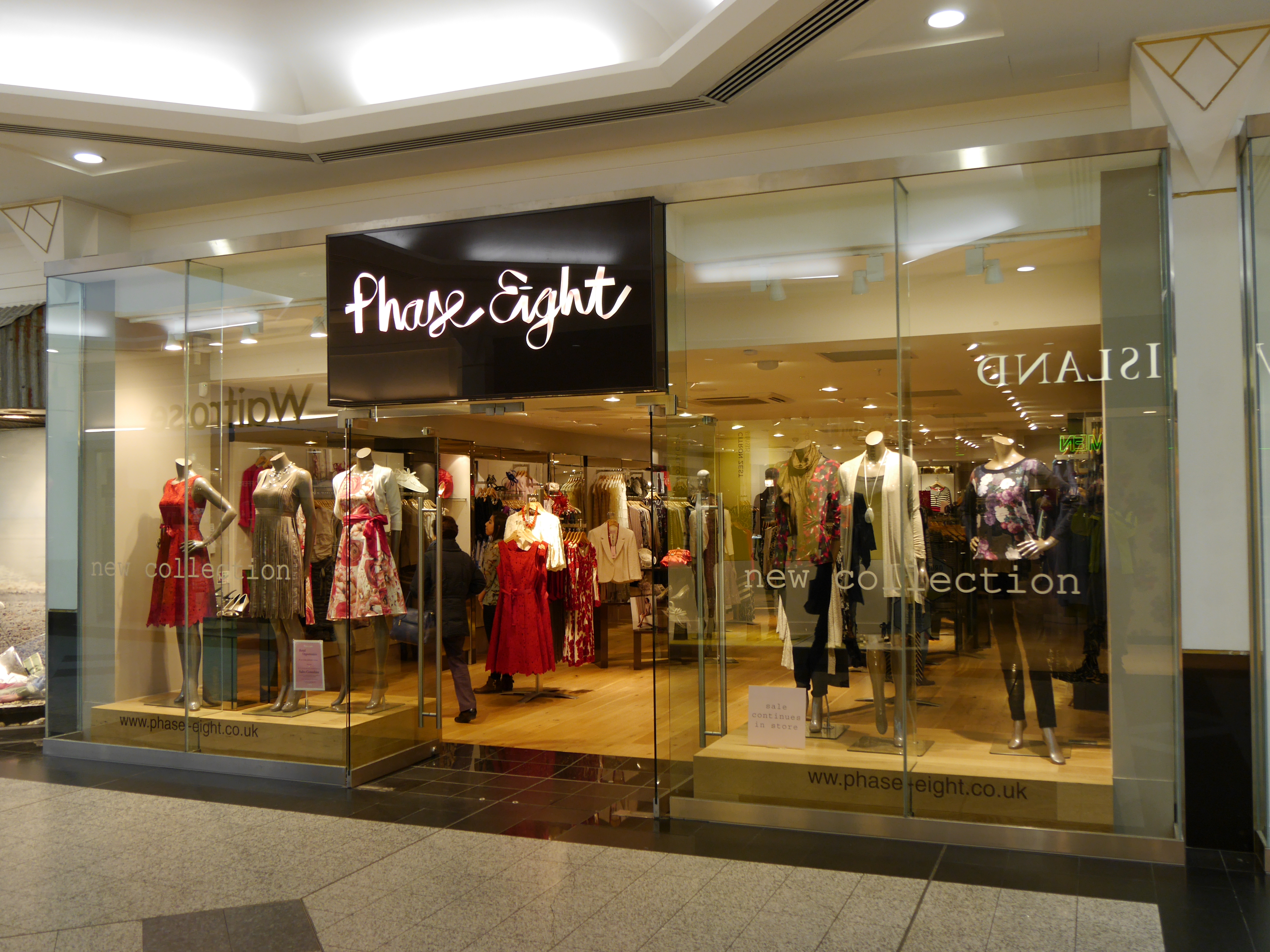
Phase Eight, Putney Exchange, London

Phase Eight is a British women's wear clothing brand. The company has stores and concessions in the United Kingdom, Ireland, Switzerland, Germany, Sweden, Australia, UAE, and other countries.

== History ==
Phase Eight was first established by Patsy Seddon in London in 1979 in a small boutique in Wandsworth Common. The name originated from a combination of P. Hayes, Patsy's maiden name, and the address of the first shop, 8 Bellevue Road. The retailer provides women's clothing designed in house, including Bridalwear and accessories.

Phase Eight was purchased by the South African retailer Foschini Group in 2015.

== Stores ==
As of 2014, the retailer had 106 stores and 207 concessions in the UK, and 18 stores and 128 concessions internationally.

Internationally, Phase Eight opened four stores in Switzerland and seven concessions in Germany through its subsidiaries and joint venture partners in 2013.
