= America's Next Top Model season 18 =

America's Next Top Model
- Season 18
- Judges: Tyra Banks; Nigel Barker; Kelly Cutrone
- No. of contestants: 14
- Winner: Sophie Sumner
- No. of episodes: 13

Release
- Original network: The CW
- Original release: February 29 – May 30, 2012

Additional information
- Filming dates: October 5 – November 18, 2011

Season chronology
- ← Previous; Season 17 Next → Season 19

The eighteenth cycle of America's Next Top Model (subtitled as America's Next Top Model: British Invasion) premiered on February 29, 2012, and was the twelfth season to air on The CW. It occupied the time slot of the final two scheduled episodes of Remodeled. This was the first American edition of Top Model to be filmed and broadcast in high definition (HD). The cycle featured fourteen contestants, placing seven British contestants who had competed in previous cycles of Britain & Ireland's Next Top Model alongside seven all-new American contestants.

Fashion industry public relations maven Kelly Cutrone replaced Vogue editor André Leon Talley as a judge for the series. The rest of the judging panel remained the same.

The international destinations for this cycle were Toronto, Ontario, Canada, and the special administrative regions of Macau and Hong Kong in China. This marked the second time the series filmed in China.

The prizes for this cycle included a modeling contract with LA Models & NY Model Management, a guest correspondent placement with Extra, a fashion spread in Vogue Italia, and both the cover and a spread in Beauty in Vogue, becoming the face of America's Next Top Model fragrance "Dream Come True", production of a record single released by CBS Records, and a US$100,000 contract with CoverGirl cosmetics.

The winner of the competition was 21-year-old British contestant Sophie Sumner from Oxford, England. American contestant Laura LaFrate placed as the runner up. British contestant Annaliese Dayes placed third. This is also the first cycle in the history of America's Next Top Model in which none of the top three contestants ever landed in the bottom two during judging.

It was also the second cycle that the last contestant to be eliminated has no first call-out.

== Casting ==
The cycle featured seven contestants from previous cycles of Britain's Next Top Model for a second chance to win the title. Cycles 1 and 7 were both unrepresented, cycles 2, 3, 4 and 6 were each represented by one contestant, and cycle 5 was represented by three contestants. Amelia Thomas from cycle 6 was supposed to also compete this season, but dropped out during casting.

== Cast ==
=== Contestants ===
(Ages stated are at start of contest)

Country	Contestant	Age	Height	Hometown	Original Cycle	Original Placement	Finish	Place
UK	Jasmia Robinson	24	1.75 m (5 ft 9 in)	London, England	BNTM 2	3	Episode 1	14
USA	Mariah Watchman	20	1.78 m (5 ft 10 in)	Pendleton, Oregon	—N/a	—N/a	Episode 2	13
UK	Louise Watts	25	1.75 m (5 ft 9 in)	Essex, England	BNTM 3	2	Episode 3	12 (quit)
USA	Candace Smith	22	1.75 m (5 ft 9 in)	Bedford-Stuyvesant, New York	—N/a	—N/a	Episode 4	11
UK	Ashley Brown	22	1.73 m (5 ft 8 in)	Armadale, Scotland	BNTM 5	4	Episode 5	10
USA	Ashley Marie 'AzMarie' Livingston	24	5 ft 10 in (1.78 m)	Milwaukee, Wisconsin	—N/a	—N/a	Episode 6	9
USA	Ashley 'Kyle' Gober	20	1.78 m (5 ft 10 in)	Magnolia, Texas	—N/a	—N/a	Episode 7	8
USA	Seymone Cohen-Fobish	19	1.80 m (5 ft 11 in)	Augusta, Georgia	—N/a	—N/a	Episode 8	7
UK	Catherine Thomas	21	1.75 m (5 ft 9 in)	Folkestone, England	BNTM 4	2	Episode 9	6
USA	Eboni Davis	18	1.75 m (5 ft 9 in)	Seattle, Washington	—N/a	—N/a	Episode 10	5
UK	Alisha White	20	1.80 m (5 ft 11 in)	South London, England	BNTM 6	2	Episode 10	4 (quit)
UK	Annaliese Dayes	24	1.70 m (5 ft 7 in)	London, England	BNTM 5	7	Episode 11	3
USA	Laura LaFrate	20	1.79 m (5 ft 10 1/2 in)	Scotia, New York	—N/a	—N/a	Episode 13	2
UK	Sophie Sumner	21	1.75 m (5 ft 9 in)	Oxford, England	BNTM 5	2	Episode 13	1

=== Judges ===
- Tyra Banks
- Nigel Barker
- Kelly Cutrone

== Episodes ==
No episode aired on April 4, 2012 due to the CW's broadcast of One Tree Hill series finale.

No. overall	No. in season	Title	Original release date	US viewers (millions)
213	1	"Kelly Osbourne"	February 29, 2012	1.17
The competition starts at Universal CityWalk in Hollywood, seven new contestants from US finding out that they would battle against previous contestants from Britain's Next Top Model. The culture clash begins with a fashion parade with the models on top of a float. The American contestants receive love from their fans, while the British contestants are welcomed by silence from the crowd. After the parade, the models take part in a runway challenge with legendary boxing ring announcer Michael Buffer as master of ceremonies. In the challenge, Ashley is offended when Candace calls her a trick, while Jasmia throws her jacket at AzMarie's face. After the show, the contestants arrive at their new home. The US contestants begin skinny dipping in the pool, which shocks the British contestants. The very first photo shoot had the contestants portraying American and British public figures while jumping on a trampoline, with sixty cameras capturing them in a 3D shot. The last duo, Seymone and Sophie, receive the most praise; while Kyle, Catherine and Laura were also lauded for their good photos. Alisha breaks down into tears, Jasmia and Mariah fall flat in their photo, while Ashley is scolded for thinking beyond the shot. At panel, Tyra states that although she is American, she would be unbiased towards judging the contestants in the competition. Catherine, Kyle, Laura, Seymone and Sophie received praise, while Louise, Alisha, Annaliese, Ashley and Jasmia struggle to make it work. Ashley and Jasmia landed in the bottom two where Tyra hands the last photograph to Ashley and Jasmia was the very first contestants eliminated.: Special guests: Kelly Osbourne, Oliver Tolentino, Michael Buffer
214	2	"Kris Jenner"	March 7, 2012	1.32
The top thirteen contestants received their makeovers at Sally Hershberger's salon. Most of the contestants were content with their makeovers except Louise, who was very dismayed with her short, darker colored makeover. Meanwhile, Eboni is burned with a curling iron upon the completion of her makeover and becomes upset for the rest of the day. The following day, the contestants had an eating challenge where they must eat some delicacies from the other team's nation including haggis, marmite, grits, chitterlings, blood pudding, pig's feet, and peanut butter. Candace irritated Seymone when she joked about Seymone eating haggis all by herself. For the photo shoot, the contestants had to pose as toddlers in groups, with Kris Jenner posing as their mother and her real-life daughters Kendall and Kylie posing as their sisters. At panel, the judges deemed that the UK contestants outperformed the US contestants in every shot, but Laura received the first call out. Seymone was criticized for simply looking "pretty" in her shot, while Mariah was reprimanded for being too sexy. AzMarie also struggled to get into character, which led to Ashley outshining her in their shot. Mariah and Seymone found themselves in the bottom two: Mariah for being unmemorable and Seymone for falling to the back of the pack and having what Tyra called "beginners' luck". Ultimately, Tyra handed the last photograph to Seymone, whose personality saved her, while Mariah became the first US contestants to leave the competition.: Featured photographer: Douglas Friedman; Special guests: Kris Jenner, Kendall Jenner, Kylie Jenner, Sally Hershberger, Victoria Recaño, Neeko, Amy Nadine
215	3	"Cat Deeley"	March 14, 2012	1.01
After the elimination of the previous episode, The British contestants pull a prank on Seymone by throwing paper balls at her while she sleeps, which leads to a clash between Seymone and the British contestants. The next morning, Tyra visits the contestants to teach and gives them their super model powers, or their "Intoxibella" powers, from her book Modelland. She also speaks to the contestants about the "Super Mogul", which is about being a businesswoman and having other jobs related to modeling. Later, the contestants meet Kelly Cutrone for their photo shoot, which is an ad campaign for Very. After the contestants are divided into groups by nation, they assign themselves a concept for the photo shoot, a leader for the group, wardrobe, hair and make-up, props, and castings for male models which are done via Virgin Mobile. At the photo shoot, Candace struggles to give more expression with her face, while Eboni fails to sell the dress. Ashley looks "disgusted" in her session, while Louise blames Annaliese for wasting time and not acting as a leader. During the session, Kelly castigates Louise for her behavior on set. After the photo shoot, the contestants are allowed to choose their final photo. Back at the house, the British contestants discuss Annaliese's disorganized leadership. At the panel, Sophie and Catherine receive praise, while Alisha and Ashley do not. During Louise's critique, Nigel calls her "mean" and Kelly calls her rude which results in Louise telling Kelly she was being rude. This ultimately leads to the judges commenting on Louise's attitude which causes her to dramatically break down and walk off-set, subsequently quitting the competition. During the elimination ceremony, Louise's name is called eighth and Tyra reveals that she would have remained in the competition had she not quit on her own accord (despite having a bad attitude and talking back to the judges). Alisha, Ashley, Candace and Eboni are all called forward as the bottom four, all of whom were not liked by the client. Nevertheless, Tyra hands the contestants a single sheet with all four of their photographs and decides to not send any of them home, partially due to them being able to handle criticism and showing potential. Louise is then seen stating that she made the right decision to quit.: Featured photographer: Jerry Metellus; Special guest: Cat Deeley
216	4	"J. Alexander"	March 21, 2012	1.25
After Louise's walk out, the British contestants become emotional after panel. Eboni becomes frustrated over her brand (30-Never) and she feels she can't portray this youthful and innocent title due to her troubled upbringing. She develops tension towards Kyle when Eboni complains about her shot at panel. The contestants are later introduced to Martin Lindstrom for their challenge, which is to present and sell a fictional product while remaining true to their brands. The judges for the challenge are a group of regular people chosen off the streets of Los Angeles. Annaliese and Sophie receive good feedback, while Eboni is criticized for coming across as a "know-it-all". Kyle receives good feedback from the crowd, which angers some of the contestants, who had thought her commercial wasn't good. Eboni and Alisha continue to attack Kyle, which pushes to her limits and makes her consider leaving the competition. Annaliese ultimately wins the reward challenge, and wins the prize with the British contestants. For the photo shoot, the contestants are taken to the Sepulveda Dam at the Los Angeles River, where they pose with vintage American cars while wearing hats by Irish designer Philip Treacy. Most of the contestants receive good feedback and do generally well, while Sophie, Seymone, and Candace struggle during the shoot. At panel, AzMarie and Laura receive strong praise for their photos. Despite having a good shot, Kyle is reprimanded for not looking like a model. Sophie is confronted by the panel for failing to deliver, but it was Seymone and Candace who ultimately find themselves in the bottom two for their mediocre photographs. Seymone is saved once again and Candace is sent home from the competition.: Featured photographer: Nigel Barker; Special guest: Martin Lindstrom
217	5	"Beverly Johnson"	March 28, 2012	1.38
The top ten contestants are informed that they will go to Toronto for the LG Fashion Week. The top ten contestants undergo castings for several different fashion shows. Ashley, Catherine and Seymone fail to book any shows, while Laura and Kyle are fired from the Pink Tartan show after being viewed as inexperienced. Eboni and Sophie end up winning the reward challenge for booking the most shows and for their excellent performance, as well. For the photo shoot, the contestants are covered with maple syrup and leaves. The contestants fly back to Los Angeles for panel and most of the praise goes to the American contestants. While her photo is critiqued, Catherine breaks down to tears for not booking any of the shows in Toronto. Eboni's excellent photograph earns her first call-out, while Ashley and Catherine land in the bottom two for not booking any of the castings. Catherine is ultimately saved due to the sheer strength of her photograph, while Ashley is sent home from the competition despite her endearing personality.: Featured photographer: Miguel Jacob; Special guests: Beverly Johnson, Kim Newport-Mimran, Jairo Betancur, Hans Koechling, Adam Taubenfligel, Travis Taddeo, Cassie Dee, Pao Lim, Danielle Martin, Jose Manuel St. Jacques, Simon Belanger, George Antonopoulos, Cynthia Florek, Erika Larva, Patrick Rahme, Anita Patrickson
218	6	"Jessica Sutta & Nadine Coyle"	April 11, 2012	1.08
In the beginning of the episode, some of the contestants accidentally rip Laura's stuffed elephant, which was given to her by her deceased friend Kevin, and throw the ear into the swimming pool. Laura then displaces her anger towards Kyle, who was trying to help but instead pushes Laura over the edge. Later, All-Star winner Lisa D'Amato informs the contestants that they will have to perform in a group music video. At the recording studio, the UK contestants do substantially better than the US contestants while Catherine excelled that performance while Kyle, Eboni, AzMarie and Sophie struggled. Later, Tyra teaches the contestants about the different types of "booty tooch". AzMarie refuses to participate in the lesson after refusing to wear the butt pad. During the music video shoot, the British contestants excelled the shoot, except for Sophie, who selling a lipstick and struggles with her shoot, while the American contestants fail to work as a team. Kyle pulls down the performance of her teammates and she runs out of the bathroom, while AzMarie is castigated for her attitude on set. At panel, all of the British contestants receive good feedback, with Sophie and Alisha deemed the contenders. This leads to Alisha earning a first call-out during the elimination ceremony, making her the first British contestants to receive one. She is quickly followed the remaining Brits: Sophie, Catherine and Annaliese. Most of the US contestants receive mixed feedback from the judges, but it is Kyle and AzMarie who ultimately land in the bottom two. AzMarie is reprimanded for being overconfident, while Kyle is told that she doesn't own her "model look". Despite her previous strong performances, AzMarie is sent home after Tyra hands the last screen-grab to Kyle.: Featured director: Tony Croll; Special guests: Nadine Coyle, Jessica Sutta, Lisa D'Amato, Tom Polce
219	7	"Estelle"	April 18, 2012	1.31
After the elimination, Laura and Sophie are still furious with Kyle. For the challenge, the contestants are separated into teams of two (UK vs US) to shoot an anti-bullying commercial for Tyra's B.I.O. campaign. Later, they are introduced to their partners, who turn out to be bullied contestants. Alisha got emotional with her partner Anahi because of her story. The British contestants won the challenge and were rewarded with video messages from their loved ones via Virgin Mobile. For the photo shoot, the contestants pose as an art installation at a dinner party with guest star Estelle in groups while "booty tooching". Some of the contestants were irritated with Kyle after she was allowed to have a butt pad while the rest of the contestants had to tooch on their own. Despite the advantage, Kyle struggles on set, along with Alisha and Catherine. At panel, Sophie received the first call-out, while Alisha and Kyle landed in the bottom two: Alisha for failing to translate her beauty into her pictures and Kyle for her declining progress and lack of versatility. In the end, Tyra hands the last photo to Alisha and Kyle is sent home.: Featured photographer: Ben Shaul; Special guest: Estelle
220	8	"Georgina Chapman"	April 25, 2012	1.15
The contestants were sent to the Beverly Hills Hotel where they met with Kelly and announced that they would do castings for the Dorchester Collection. Alisha, Annaliese and Sophie were all chosen to open for a fashion show collection. During the challenge, Catherine slipped during rehearsals while Seymone got irritated by her feedback. Alisha won the challenge after her show (Anndra Neen) was deemed the best. For the week's photo shoot, the remaining contestants wear heavy couture dresses made of Hello Kitty-themed accessories designed by Filipino fashion designer Francis Libiran. Annaliese wowed the photographer and Jay, but two US girls struggled with the shoot: Eboni looked incredibly stiff, and Seymone was slated for her constant complaining. At panel, Alisha was praised for her photo and her performance during the challenge, ultimately receiving the first call-out. Most of the other contestants received mixed feedback, but Eboni and Seymone landed in the bottom two: Eboni for not selling her given brand and Seymone for not taking the competition seriously. In the end, Eboni was saved and Seymone was sent home after landing in the bottom two for the third time.: Featured photographer: Ann He; Special guests: Georgina Chapman, Brownwyn Cosgrave, Phoebe Stephens, Annette Stephens, Sofia Sizzi, Julian Louie, Siki Im, Giovanna Bataglia, Derek Blasberg, Elizabeth Saltzman, Keren Craig, Francisco Costa
221	9	"Barney Cheng"	May 2, 2012	1.01
Two US contestants are still in the running against four British contestants, Nigel surprised the contestants with some Macanese food and told them that they would go to Macau for the rest of the competition. Upon arriving in Macau, they learned that they would stay at grand MGM Macau hotel for the remainder of the competition. Sophie irritated Alisha for not putting her belongings back in her bag. After the contestants received their fortunes and auras from a Chinese astrologer Clement Chan and his students, they were instructed to recreate their aura with fashion. Laura won the challenge and shared her prize with her co-American model Eboni, which was a massage at the MGM Six Sense Spa. For the photo shoot, the contestants posed with silk gowns by Barney Cheng accessorized with silkworms. At panel, Laura received the first call-out for her stunning photograph. Alisha and Catherine landed in the bottom two, Alisha for making the gown look cheaper and Catherine for her weak photograph and lacking consistency. In the end, Alisha was saved and Catherine was sent home.: Featured photographer: Paul Tsang; Special guests: Barney Cheng, Toby Leung, Isabel Augusto, Clement Chan, Anita Patrickson
222	10	"Nicholas Tse"	May 9, 2012	1.06
The contestants were taken to Hong Kong where they met Nicholas Tse, who taught them some basic martial arts in preparation for their challenge. At the challenge, each contestant took a motion shot with lines given to them to deliver. Laura won the challenge and won an opportunity to star in a video with Nicholas Tse back in Hong Kong. After the challenge, the contestants joked that Laura seduced Nicholas, and Eboni added that Laura was sleeping her way to the top, which angered her. At the photo shoot, the contestants posed atop the Macau Tower (with harnesses that are later edited out of the photos), which they took with the rain and wind. Sophie struggled with her fear of heights, but still managed to take good photos. At panel, Alisha and Eboni were criticized for their lackluster photos, while Annaliese was for being a presenter rather than a fashion model. Laura was praised for not letting anything come down to her nerves, while Sophie was commended for facing her fear and producing a stunning photograph. Laura received her second consecutive first call-out (also her third in the competition), while Alisha and Eboni landed in the bottom two for their relatively weak performances throughout the competition despite having strong potential. Tyra handed the last photograph to Alisha, but Alisha burst into tears and surprisingly quit the competition in order to accommodate Eboni. Alisha explained that she did not want to take the opportunity away from the contestants who wanted to be there more than her and that she had lost her spirit. Tyra allowed Alisha to quit, however Eboni was still eliminated regardless of Alisha's decision to quit, due to her previously being saved alongside Candace, Alisha and Ashley after Louise quit the competition in week three, unlike Ambreal Williams from Cycle 9, who was given "a free pass" by Tyra after Ebony Morgan decided to quit. This marks the first time in America's Next Top Model history that more than one contestant decided to quit during the same season.: Featured photographer: Nigel Barker; Special guest: Nicholas Tse, Anita Patrickson
223	11	"Jez Smith"	May 16, 2012	1.16
The top three contestants headed to Hong Kong and were welcomed by Kelly for their go-sees, where they could earn HK$1,000 for each go-see booked. They each selected their own male models that will help guide them through the city. Laura was castigated mainly on her runway walk, Annaliese received mixed feedback from the designers, while Sophie was liked by almost all of the designers and ultimately won the challenge. They celebrated through the night together with their companions. For the photo shoot, the remaining girls posed inside a life-sized bottle for a youth-themed "Dream Come True" campaign, with Ben Bennett as their client. Sophie impressed the client and Mr. Jay with her shoot, while Annaliese looked stiff and did not bring her personality to the shoot, and Laura impressed to look soft and sweet. At panel, Sophie easily received the first call-out for her outstanding performance at the go-see challenge and her perfect photograph. Annaliese and Laura landed in the bottom two, both for the first time ever; Annaliese for being a presenter rather than a model despite improving immensely throughout the competition, and Laura for her runway walk and photograph, which came across as sexy rather than sweet and dreamy. In the end, Tyra handed the last photo to Laura and sent Annaliese home.: Featured photographer: Jez Smith; Special guest: Ben Bennett, William Tang, Gregory Derham, Henry Lau, Marisa Zeman, Evelyn Ho, Marco Chan, Anita Patrickson
224	12	"Highlights"	May 23, 2012	0.83
This episode recapped the previous episodes of this cycle, running through the challenges, photo shoots and dramatic moments along with never-before-seen footage. Previously unaired footage includes an impromptu Eboni vs. Sophie rap battle, Mariah's culture, Seymone's breakdown when the Brits ganged up on her, Sophie's first time cleaning, Sophie and Catherine's ninja skills, Sophie's imitation of the panel and much more.: Special guest: Anansa Sims
225	13	"Season Finale"	May 30, 2012	1.42
The final two shot for their CoverGirl Blast Flipstick commercial and photoshoot. Some of the clips were taken throughout their journey in the competition. Laura impressed with the shoot, although she later suffered from a panic attack and was taken to the hospital, unable to finish her commercial. Mr. Jay later dropped by the hotel in order to wrap up her commercial. Then, Valentina Serra welcomed the final two for their shoot in a spread for Vogue Italia; Sophie impressed, while Laura shone and impressed the clients. Tyra later visited the models in their apartment in order to interview both of them. Laura spoke about her life struggles. Meanwhile, Sophie talked about her insecurities for competing in an American competition. In the final runway, for the first time, the final two participated in a holographic runway show for Forever 21. Eliminated contestants Catherine, Eboni and Annaliese along with Alisha despite quitting the competition, also joined the final two for the show. Both of the contestants impressed the judges. At panel, Laura was criticized for her CoverGirl photo, but she redeemed herself with her commercial. Sophie excelled more in her photo than in her commercial. Laura's rebel personality and Sophie's bright presence were both praised. Sophie was named the winner of America's Next Top Model, making her the first-ever non-American winner of the show.: Featured Photographer: Jez Smith; Special guest: Valentina Serra

== Summaries ==
=== Call-out order ===
Order	Episodes											
Order	1	2	3 (Note: In episode 3, Louise would have been called eighth had she not quit the competition. After revealing this, Tyra asked Alisha, Ashley, Candace, and Eboni to step forward and announced that they were all safe.)	4	5	6	7	8	9	10 (Note: In episode 10, Alisha quit the competition after Tyra announced that she was safe however Eboni was still eliminated.)	11	13
1	Seymone	Laura	AzMarie	AzMarie	Eboni	Alisha	Sophie	Alisha	Laura	Laura	Sophie	Sophie
2	Kyle	Ashley	Sophie	Laura	AzMarie	Sophie	Seymone	Sophie	Annaliese	Sophie	Laura	Laura
3	Sophie	Eboni	Laura	Kyle	Sophie	Catherine	Eboni	Catherine	Sophie	Annaliese	Annaliese	
4	Laura	Catherine	Kyle	Catherine	Seymone	Annaliese	Annaliese	Laura	Eboni	Alisha		
5	Catherine	Candace	Catherine	Annaliese	Laura	Seymone	Laura	Annaliese	Alisha	Eboni		
6	Candace	Kyle	Seymone	Eboni	Kyle	Laura	Catherine	Eboni	Catherine			
7	Mariah	Sophie	Annaliese	Alisha	Alisha	Eboni	Alisha	Seymone				
8	AzMarie	Annaliese	Louise	Ashley	Annaliese	Kyle	Kyle					
9	Eboni	Louise	Alisha; Ashley; Candace; Eboni	Sophie	Catherine	AzMarie						
10	Louise	Alisha	Alisha; Ashley; Candace; Eboni	Seymone	Ashley							
11	Alisha	AzMarie	Alisha; Ashley; Candace; Eboni	Candace								
12	Annaliese	Seymone	Alisha; Ashley; Candace; Eboni									
13	Ashley	Mariah										
14	Jasmia											

The contestant was eliminated
The contestant quit the competition
The contestant was part of a non-elimination bottom four
The contestant won the competition

=== Bottom two ===
Episode	Contestants	Eliminated
1	Ashley & Jasmia	Jasmia
2	Mariah & Seymone	Mariah
3	Alisha, Ashley, Candace & Eboni	Louise
3	Alisha, Ashley, Candace & Eboni	None
4	Candace & Seymone	Candace
5	Ashley & Catherine	Ashley
6	AzMarie & Kyle	AzMarie
7	Alisha & Kyle	Kyle
8	Eboni & Seymone	Seymone
9	Alisha & Catherine	Catherine
10	Alisha & Eboni	Eboni
10	Alisha & Eboni	Alisha
11	Annaliese & Laura	Annaliese
13	Laura & Sophie	Laura

The contestant was eliminated after their first time in the bottom two
The contestant was eliminated after their second time in the bottom two
The contestant was eliminated after their third time in the bottom two
The contestant quit the competition
The contestant was eliminated in the final judging and placed as the runner-up

=== Average call-out order ===
Casting call-out order and final two are not included.

Place	Model		Episodes											Call-Out Total	# of Call-Outs	Call-Out Average	Rank by Average
Place	Model		1	2	3	4	5	6	7	8	9	10	11	Call-Out Total	# of Call-Outs	Call-Out Average	Rank by Average
1	🇬🇧	Sophie	3	7	2	9	3	2	1	2	3	2	1	35	11	3.18	2nd
2	🇺🇸	Laura	4	1	3	2	5	6	5	4	1	1	2	34	11	3.09	1st
3	🇬🇧	Annaliese	12	8	7	5	8	4	4	5	2	3	3	61	11	5.55	7th
4	🇬🇧	Alisha	11	10	9	7	7	1	7	1	5	4		62	10	6.20	9th
5	🇺🇸	Eboni	9	3	9	6	1	7	3	6	4	5		53	10	5.30	5th
6	🇬🇧	Catherine	5	4	5	4	9	3	6	3	6			45	9	5.00	3rd
7	🇺🇸	Seymone	1	12	6	10	4	5	2	7				47	8	5.88	8th
8	🇺🇸	Kyle	2	6	4	3	6	8	8					37	7	5.29	4th
9	🇺🇸	AzMarie	8	11	1	1	2	9						32	6	5.33	6th
10	🇬🇧	Ashley	13	2	9	8	10							42	5	8.40	11th
11	🇺🇸	Candace	6	5	9	11								31	4	7.75	10th
12	🇬🇧	Louise	10	9	8									27	3	9.00	12th
13	🇺🇸	Mariah	7	13										20	2	10.00	13th
14	🇬🇧	Jasmia	14	SAFE	SAFE	SAFE	SAFE	SAFE	SAFE	SAFE	SAFE	SAFE	SAFE	14	1	14.00	14th
			SAFE	SAFE	SAFE	SAFE	SAFE	SAFE	SAFE	SAFE	SAFE	SAFE	SAFE				

=== Photo shoots ===
- Episode 1 photo shoot: American vs. British public figures
- Episode 2 photo shoot: Toddlers of Kris Jenner
- Episode 3 photo shoot: Very.com trends campaign
- Episode 4 photo shoot: Posing with British hats and American cars
- Episode 5 photo shoot: Covered in maple leaves and syrup
- Episode 6 music video: Booty Tooch group video
- Episode 7 photo shoot: Art installments at a dinner party hosted by Estelle
- Episode 8 photo shoot: Hello Kitty couture
- Episode 9 photo shoot: Wearing silk dresses with silkworms
- Episode 10 photo shoot: Harnessed on the Macau Tower
- Episode 11 photo shoot: Dream Come True perfume in a life-sized bottle
- Episode 13 photo shoot & commercial: Beauty in Vogue spread; CoverGirl Blast Flipstick commercial and print ad

=== Makeovers ===
- Mariah – Dark brown ombre with bangs
- Louise – Cut short with brown highlights
- Candace – Long straight light brown weave
- Ashley – Trimmed and dyed copper
- AzMarie – Shaved design
- Kyle – Dyed strawberry blonde with bangs
- Seymone – Long wavy milk chocolate brown weave
- Catherine – Dyed magenta pink
- Eboni – Long straight brown ombre weave with bangs
- Alisha – Shoulder length black weave with one side shaved
- Annaliese – Mel B inspired curly black weave, later; weave removed
- Laura – Dyed platinum blonde with blue & red clip-in extensions
- Sophie – Dyed cotton candy pink with bleached eyebrows

== Criticism ==
During filming, an argument took place between judge Kelly Cutrone and contestant Louise Watts, resulting in Watts voluntarily leaving the show. Following transmission of the episode, Cutrone posted mocking videos to Watts online, and came under fire from fans of the show who accused her of cyberbullying.

== Trivia ==
- In a 2018 Instagram post, Annaliese Dayes revealed that during the photoshoot in episode 10, where the girls were photographed on top of Macau Tower, the girls experienced "hail stones and gale force winds at 388 metres above the ground". She also revealed that the weather was so bad, that the tower was closed "to the public due to the treacherous weather".
- Dayes revealed on Instagram that the episode 2 photoshoot that with Kris Jenner was filmed on her 25th birthday, describing the day as "one of my best and most memorable birthdays ever!".
- It was revealed that Amelia Thomas from Britain's Next Top Model (cycle 6) was supposed to take part as a contestant on America's Next Top Model as the eighth former BNTM Contestant. However, due to stress and other factors, Amelia withdrew before the competition aired.

== Notes ==
America's Next Top Model can be viewed on Hulu.
