= Company (British magazine) =

British fashion, celebrity and lifestyle magazine

- June 2013 cover featuring Demi Lovato
- Categories: Fashion and Celebrity
- Frequency: Monthly
- Total circulation (June 2013): 90,726
- Founded: 1978
- Final issue: October 2014 (print)
- Company: Hearst
- Country: United Kingdom
- Website: www.company.co.uk

Company was a monthly fashion, celebrity and lifestyle magazine published in the United Kingdom from 1978.

== History and profile ==
The magazine was started in 1978. It celebrated its 30th birthday in 2008, and in that time has had only six editors: Maggie Goodman, Gil Hudson, Mandi Norwood, Fiona Macintosh, Sam Baker, and the current editor, Victoria White. The magazine was published on a monthly basis and generally featured celebrities on its covers.

In 2014, the magazine moved online-only. Its last print edition was published in October 2014. The magazine's website address www.company.co.uk now redirects to that of Cosmopolitan magazine.

== Association with Britain's Next Top Model ==
The winner of Britain's Next Top Model was awarded the cover as well as a six-page editorial with Company. Currently, there have been seven such winners: Lianna Fowler, Lauren McAvoy, Alex Evans, Mecia Simson, Tiffany Pisani, Jade Thompson, Letitia Herod and Lauren Lambert.
