= Derek Lawlor =

Irish fashion knitwear designer

- Born: Portlaoise, Ireland
- Education: Central Saint Martins
- Occupation: Fashion designer
- Website: dereklawlor.com

Derek Lawlor is an Irish fashion knitwear designer, based in London, United Kingdom. Recognised internationally for creating unique textures in his designs, Lawlor has been featured in Vogue, Vogue Italia, The Telegraph, and Grazia. In addition to his own knitwear label, he has produced exclusive pieces for clients including musical artists Leona Lewis, V V Brown, and Katy B, as well as The Royal Ballet, who have modeled his knits.

== Early life and education ==
Lawlor was born in Portlaoise, Ireland, and grew up in Sussex, England. He attributes his early appreciation for knitwear to summers spent with his grandmothers and aunts as they knitted and made lace.

He moved to London in 2003 to study textile design at Central Saint Martins, where he specialised in knitwear. After completing his BA, Lawlor went on to complete a master's degree in Fashion Knitwear at St Martins in 2009. His MA collection received acclaim for "his trademark cord-working techniques, in which wax cord is applied to knit in integrated patterns, resulting in graphic sculptural effects which transform the silhouette of the garment."

== Career ==
Lawlor is known for his special technique with cord work, using wax cord to create shapes and loops over garments. His work has been showcased at London Fashion Week every season since graduation.

In 2010, his sculptural knitwear was part of the Finnish brand Marimekko's fall collection. His own fall/winter 2010 collection was featured in Vogue Italia, which lauded his "love for the quality of materials", noting that he had been inspired by the texture and colour of paintings by John Piper. Journalist Andrea Deanesi characterised his style as incorporating "elegance and femininity with a touch of sensuality and impertinence."

In 2011, Lawlor collaborated with Welsh designer Jayne Pierson on a new textile fusing together "his" knitwear with "her" leather, working from her studio in Pembrey. The result was a fabric resembling very soft suede, which Pierson featured in her spring/summer 2012 collection. His own fashion knitwear has generated positive press; the Autumn Winter 2012 collection was cited as work which changes the boundaries of knitwear design.

He has also collaborated with designer Natalie B. Coleman and milliner Margaret O'Connor, with whom he shared the 2017 Global Innovation Award in Shanghai. Lawlor participated in the CREATE show for three consecutive years.
