= Charlotte Holmes =

English commercial model and TV presenter (born 1988)

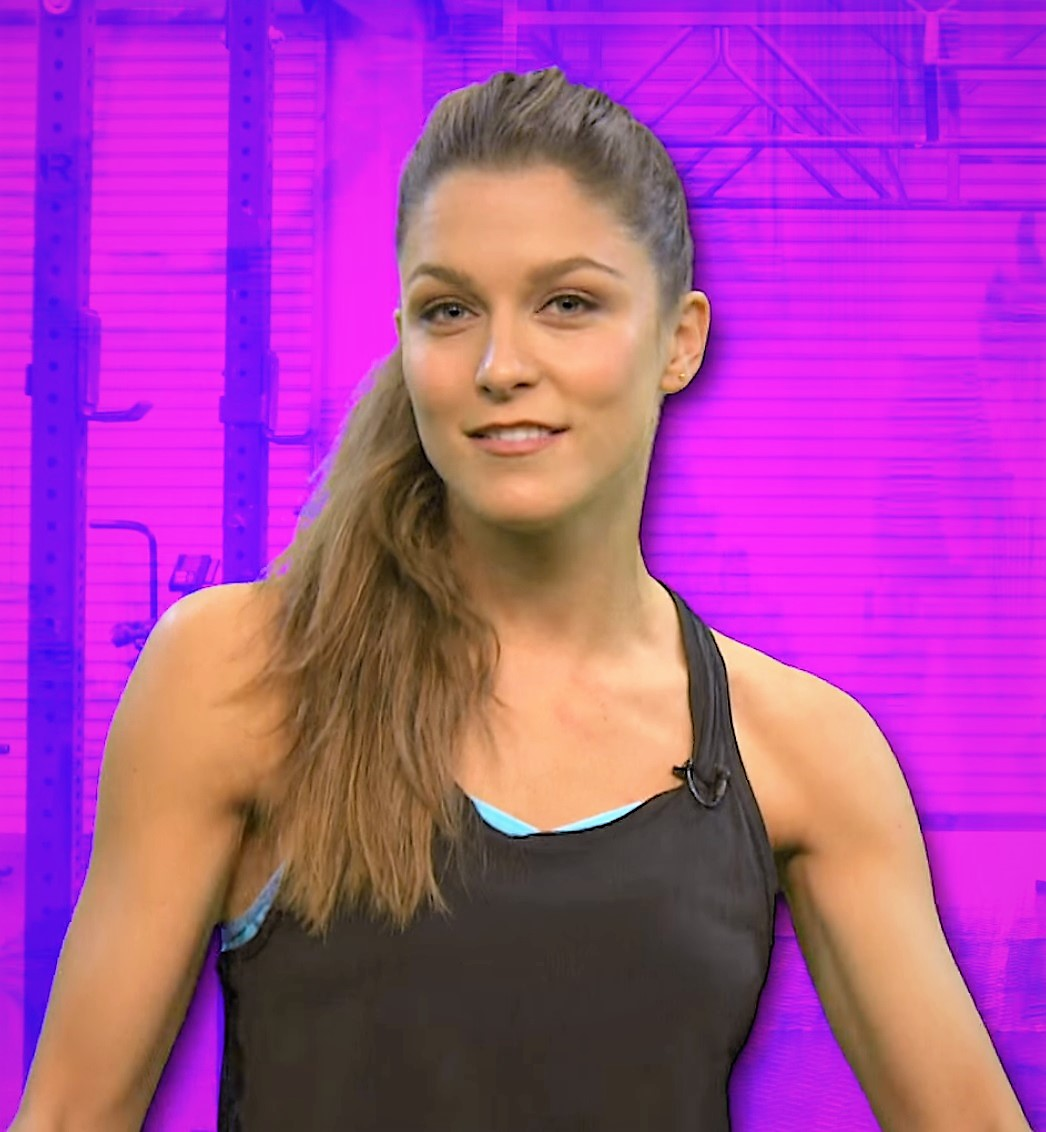
- Holmes in a 2018 promotion for Ex on the Beach
- Born: Charlotte Louise Holmes; 29 September 1988 (age 38); Hammersmith, London, England
- Beauty pageant titleholder
- Title: Miss England 2012
- Major competitions: Miss England 2012 (Winner); Miss World 2012 (Top 15)
- Website: www.charlottelouiseholmes.com

Charlotte Louise Holmes (born 29 September 1988) is an English TV host, model, and beauty pageant titleholder who was crowned Miss England 2012 and represented her country at Miss World 2012. She became the eleventh contestant eliminated on Britain and Ireland's Next Top Model in 2010.

== Early life ==
Holmes was born at Queen Charlotte's Hospital in Hammersmith on 29 September 1988 to parents Kenneth and Yvonne Holmes, and grew up in Torpoint, Cornwall. She has one sister, Lucy, born 8 March 1991.

She attended Torpoint Junior School, followed by Devonport High School for Girls in Plymouth, where she earned ten GCSEs and four A-Levels in biology, French, chemistry and general studies. She then enrolled at Cardiff University to study physiotherapy before dropping out to move to London and pursue a modeling career.

== Career ==
Holmes's modeling career started when she was 19, and she is currently represented by MOT Models. She has modeled for brands including Marks & Spencer; appeared in bridal, fitness and lifestyle magazines; and has been an in-store model for Abercrombie & Fitch for four years. She is also the face of the sports brand Do Unlimited.

In June 2007, she won The Face of Plymouth, a local competition run by The Plymouth Herald. She spent the year representing Plymouth and the newspaper at city-based charity and media events, and went on to judge the competition in 2009 and host it in 2010. She was crowned Miss Cornwall in March 2009, in her first appearance in the Miss England competition, and finished fourth in the national final.

She appeared on Sky Living's Britain and Ireland's Next Top Model, hosted by Elle Macpherson, in 2010, and finished in fourth place. She was championed by Macpherson from the start and was quickly dubbed "Baby Elle", angering fellow competitors who said the competition was fixed for her to win. When Holmes was eliminated, the show's website temporarily shut down due to a huge influx of complaints. Tiffany Pisani was crowned the winner of the series.

In her third and final attempt to win the Miss England title, Holmes competed at Miss London in February 2012. She was crowned Miss Charity after raising £1500 for the Thai Children's Trust, but narrowly lost the actual title to Amy Willerton. She went on to compete at Miss Devon and won. On 26 June 2012, she was crowned Miss England at the Leicester Athena. She was also crowned Miss Front Top Model by the Front Academy.

Holmes spent six weeks competing in the Miss World pageant in China, and represented England in the final on 18 August 2012 in Ordos, Inner Mongolia. She placed eighth and was also a finalist in the Charity, Top Model and Sports rounds. She won the long jump competition, jumping 4.40 meters; came second in the 100m sprint; and was the fastest member of her 4 × 100 m relay team.

== Charity work ==
Holmes has supported various charities, and has worked especially closely with Variety GB, The Children's Charity. She completed the London Marathon in April 2011, raising £2000, and ran again in 2013. Since 2009, through various events, she has raised over £8000 for Variety. She has also supported cancer research by running the Race for Life. In September 2012, she skydived with the Red Devils as part of her Miss World Beauty With a Purpose campaign and raised £1000. More recently, she has supported Help for Heroes by completing the Tough Mudder race; the Naked Heart Foundation by running the Paris half marathon; and Shelter by completing Vertical Rush (running up Tower 42 in London).

In October 2012, Holmes was asked by Robert Winston to become an ambassador for the Genesis Research Trust, which raises money for British scientists and clinicians who are researching the causes of and cures for conditions that affect the health of women and babies. In September 2013, she participated in a cycling expedition around Sri Lanka with Winston and a group of women who had been affected by problems during and after pregnancy. They cycled 390 km over five days with a pledge to raise £3500 each.

Honorary titles
Preceded by Alize Lily Mounter	Miss England; 2012	Succeeded by Kirsty Heslewood
