= Britain's Next Top Model series 4 =

Britain's Next Top Model
- Season 4
- Judges: Lisa Snowdon; Huggy Ragnarsson; Gerry DeVeaux
- No. of contestants: 14
- Winner: Alex Evans
- No. of episodes: 12

Release
- Original network: Living
- Original release: 21 April – 7 July 2008

Series chronology
- ← Previous; Series 3 Next → Series 5

Britain's Next Top Model, Cycle 4 is the fourth cycle of Britain's Next Top Model. The cycle, like the previous cycles, was aired on SkyLiving. The cycle was said to be bigger, better and bustier than ever before. The cycle was revolutionary for its time in that it featured shorter girls with heavier set frames and a larger bust.

There were major changes in this cycle. The winner's prize changed and the judging panel also received a change; Icelandic reality TV star hopeful Huggy Ragnarsson and Gerry Deveaux replaced two of the former judges, Paula Hamilton and Jonathan Phang.

This is the only cycle to feature a cast of 14 contestants until Cycle 6, rather than the usual 12 or 13. The international destination during this cycle was South Africa. The winner's prize was a contract with Models 1, a Max Factor Cosmetics campaign and a 6-page spread and cover of Company Magazine.

The winner was 18-year-old Alex Evans from Cranleigh, Surrey, who battled against a moderately severe anger problem and height defect to emerge triumphant.

Runner-up Catherine Thomas participated as a contestant on America's Next Top Model, Cycle 18 along with six other former BNTM contestants. Thomas was eliminated in the 9th episode after failing to impress at panel.

== Cast ==
=== Contestants ===
(Ages stated are at time of contest)

Contestant	Age	Height	Hometown	Finish	Rank
Sophie Roberts	18	1.73 m (5 ft 8 in)	King's Lynn, England	Episode 1	14
Musayeroh Barrie	20	1.73 m (5 ft 8 in)	London, England	Episode 2	13
Louise Heywood	20	1.73 m (5 ft 8 in)	Rochdale, England	Episode 3	12
Lauren Donaldson-Stanley	18	1.70 m (5 ft 7 in)	Portsmouth, England	Episode 4	11
Lindsey 'Lynzi' Arnott	24	1.78 m (5 ft 10 in)	Aldershot, England	Episode 5	10
Lisa-Jane 'Lisa' Fowler	22	1.74 m (5 ft 8 1/2 in)	Potters Bar, England	Episode 6	9
Martha Braddell	18	1.82 m (5 ft 11 1/2 in)	Oxford, England	Episode 7	8-7
Leanne Nagle	18	1.75 m (5 ft 9 in)	Colchester, England	Episode 7	8-7
Aaron Hunt	18	1.73 m (5 ft 8 in)	Nottingham, England	Episode 8	6
Charlotte Denton	20	1.75 m (5 ft 9 in)	Liverpool, England	Episode 9	5
Rachael Cairns	19	1.74 m (5 ft 8 1/2 in)	Leeds, England	Episode 11	4
Stefanie Wilson	22	1.73 m (5 ft 8 in)	London, England	Episode 12	3
Catherine Thomas	18	1.75 m (5 ft 9 in)	Folkestone, England	Episode 12	2
Alexandra 'Alex' Evans	18	1.71 m (5 ft 7 1/2 in)	Cranleigh, England	Episode 12	1

=== Judges ===
- Lisa Snowdon
- Huggy Ragnarsson
- Gerry DeVeaux

== Results ==
Order	Episode												
Order	1	2	3	4	5	6	7	8	9	10	11	12	
1	Rachael	Lisa	Rachael	Charlotte	Stefanie	Leanne	Catherine	Stefanie	Alex	Rachael	Alex	Alex	Alex
2	Lisa	Stefanie	Martha	Aaron	Martha	Alex	Alex	Catherine	Catherine	Stefanie	Catherine	Catherine	Catherine
3	Catherine	Rachael	Lisa	Martha	Charlotte	Stefanie	Stefanie	Rachael	Rachael	Alex; Catherine	Stefanie	Stefanie	
4	Alex	Lauren	Alex	Catherine	Aaron	Aaron	Charlotte	Alex	Stefanie	Alex; Catherine	Rachael		
5	Louise	Aaron	Leanne	Alex	Rachael	Catherine	Aaron	Charlotte	Charlotte				
6	Lauren	Charlotte	Charlotte	Rachael	Catherine	Rachael	Rachael	Aaron					
7	Leanne	Lynzi	Aaron	Leanne	Leanne	Martha	Leanne; Martha						
8	Stefanie	Louise	Catherine	Stefanie	Alex	Charlotte	Leanne; Martha						
9	Charlotte	Catherine	Lynzi	Lynzi	Lisa	Lisa							
10	Lynzi	Leanne	Stefanie	Lisa	Lynzi								
11	Martha	Martha	Lauren	Lauren									
12	Musayeroh	Alex	Louise										
13	Aaron	Musayeroh											
14	Sophie												

The contestant was eliminated
The contestants were in the bottom two, but nobody was eliminated
The contestant won the competition

=== Average call-out order ===
Final two is not included.

Rank by average	Place	Model	Call-out total	Number of call-outs	Call-out average
1	4	Rachael	39	11	3.55
2-3	1	Alex	47	12	3.92
2-3	2	Catherine	47	12	3.92
4	3	Stefanie	48	12	4.00
5	5	Charlotte	46	9	5.11
6	9	Lisa	34	6	5.67
7	6	Aaron	46	8	5.75
8	7-8	Martha	43	7	6.14
9	7-8	Leanne	44	7	6.29
10	11	Lauren	32	4	8.00
11	12	Louise	25	3	8.33
12	10	Lynzi	45	5	9.00
13	13	Musayeroh	25	2	12.50
14	14	Sophie	14	1	14.00

=== Bottom two ===
Episode	Contestants	Eliminated
1	Aaron & Sophie	Sophie
2	Alex & Musayeroh	Musayeroh
3	Lauren & Louise	Louise
4	Lauren & Lisa	Lauren
5	Lisa & Lynzi	Lynzi
6	Charlotte & Lisa	Lisa
7	Leanne & Martha	Leanne
7	Leanne & Martha	Martha
8	Aaron & Charlotte	Aaron
9	Charlotte & Stefanie	Charlotte
10	Alex & Catherine	None
11	Rachael & Stefanie	Rachael
12	Catherine & Stefanie	Stefanie
12	Alex & Catherine	Catherine

The contestant was eliminated after her first time in the bottom two
The contestant was eliminated after her second time in the bottom two
The contestant was eliminated after her third time in the bottom two
The contestant was eliminated in the final judging and placed as the runner-up

=== Photo Shoot Guide ===
- Episode 1 Photoshoot: Topless in Pairs
- Episode 2 Photoshoot: Girl's Night Out
- Episode 3 Photoshoot: Canine Couture
- Episode 4 Photoshoot: Posing with Lotus Cars
- Episode 5 Photoshoot: The 10 Commandments of Fashion
- Episode 6 Photoshoot: Music Album Covers
- Episode 7 Commercial & Photoshoot: QVC Jewelry; 18th Century Queens
- Episode 8 Photoshoot: Mannequins
- Episode 9 Photoshoot: Olympic Sports
- Episode 10 Photoshoots: Company Magazine Cover; Max Factor Beauty Shots
- Episode 11 Photoshoot: African Tribe Couture Warriors
- Episode 12 Photoshoot: Fake Bake Tanning with African Animals in Safari

== Ratings ==
Episode Viewing figures from BARB

Episode	Date	Total Viewers	Living Weekly Ranking
1	21 April 2008	353,000	1
2	28 April 2008	302,000	2
3	5 May 2008	311,000	1
4	12 May 2008	351,000	1
5	19 May 2008	321,000	2
6	26 May 2008	315,000	1
7	2 June 2008	296,000	2
8	9 June 2008	296,000	2
9	16 June 2008	274,000	2
10	23 June 2008	311,000	2
11	30 June 2008	361,000	3
12	7 July 2008	417,000	2
