= Jade McSorley =

British model

- Born: Jade McSorley; 16 February 1988 (age 38); Middlesbrough, North Yorkshire, England
- Occupation: Fashion model
- Modelling information
- Height: 5 ft 9 in (1.75 m)
- Hair colour: Brown
- Eye colour: Blue
- Agency: Nevs Models

Jade McSorley (born 16 February 1988) is a British model, most notable for been the last eliminated on the fifth series of Britain's Next Top Model (2009).

== Britain's Next Top Model ==
McSorley first garnered public attention by participating in the 2009 series of Britain's Next Top Model. She established herself as a front-runner in the show, and with the exception of the bootcamp and the first week of the produced shows, she was always put through to the next round as one of the top three performing contestants. She won three in-show competitions, including two in the same week at the top 4 stage.

She became a fan favourite due to her consistently strong performances and likeable personality. After the second week, McSorley was never placed outside the second best photo, with the exception in eighth week when she was placed third. McSorley was last eliminated from the competition and was never in the bottom 2 appearance. The judges stated that whilst they felt McSorley had progressed massively during the competition, they still felt that she wasn't ready to handle the modelling industry, and head judge Lisa Snowdon expressed doubts that McSorley would be able maintain her recovery from her disorder if she were to model full-time.

== After Britain's Next Top Model ==
McSorley signed with the Models 1 agency in London, the second non-winning BNTM contestant to be signed with that agency.

It was announced in September 2009 that McSorley would front a makeover show through Living TV's upcoming online channel, starting 23 October 2009.

Since the completion of the show, McSorley has modelled for Urban Outfitters, asos.com, and luxury lingerie company Tallulah Love, showcasing their vintage collection which launched in Paris in January 2010.

In recent years, McSorley has modelled for a Swatch campaign with photographer Rankin. and was featured in a spread for Grazia Magazine. She was the model for House of Fraser's collection Label Lab, Sony Ericsson, Bank Clothing, MyWardrobe.com, and Urban Outfitters. She has been the face of British heritage brand Fred Perry for several seasons. She has also appeared in the pages of Vogue UK due to her distinctive personal style.

McSorley returned to the Top Model franchise when she walked in a fashion show for the live final of Britain's Next Top Model series 6. She is currently signed to Touché Models in Amsterdam and exclusive New York agency One Management, which has names such as Erin O'Connor, Helena Christensen, Bar Refaeli, and singer Cassie. In 2015, she signed with Premium Models in Paris.

== See also ==
- List of Britain's Next Top Model contestants
