= Huggy Ragnarsson =

Icelandic-born American photographer

Hugrún "Huggy" Ragnarsson is an Icelandic-American fashion photographer and former fashion model, born in Reykjavík, Iceland. She moved to the United States when she was 11 months old and her mother only 19.

In 1980, she won the first Teen magazine "Great Model Search." In November 1981, she competed in the Miss Teen USA pageant and won the title of 1982 Miss Teen USA, with her reign ending in November 1982.

While modeling, Ragnarsson turned her attention to fashion photography, which became her full-time career. She has photographed many famous faces, including Lisa Snowdon.

She served as one of the judges on the modelling reality show Britain's Next Top Model for two cycles.
