= Mecia Simson =

British actress and model (born 1989)

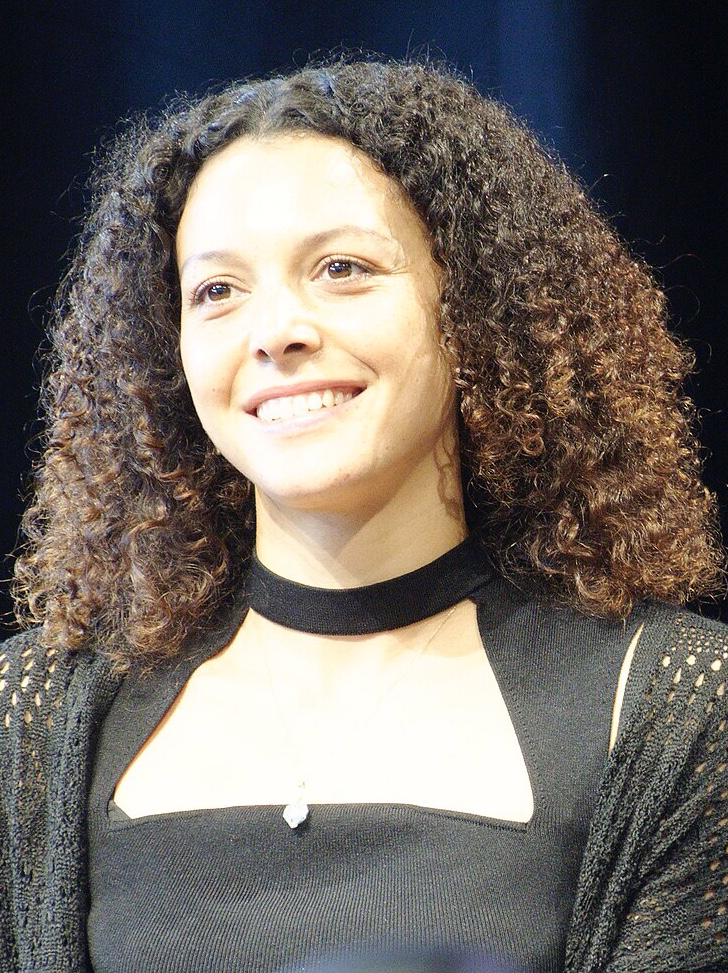
- Simson at the 2022 Comic-Con Germany Stuttgart
- Born: Mecia Simone Simson; 29 December 1989 (age 36); Plymouth, England
- Education: Italia Conti Academy of Theatre Arts
- Occupations: Actress; model
- Years active: 2009–present

Mecia Simone Simson (MEE-shə; born 29 December 1989) is an English actress and model. She won the fifth series of Britain's Next Top Model (2009). She played Francesca Findabair in the Netflix series The Witcher (2021–).

== Early life and education ==
Simson was born in Plymouth to an English mother and a Jamaican father. She attended Dunstone Primary School, Plymstock School, and City College Plymouth. After taking a year-long foundation course at the Central School of Speech and Drama in 2016, Simson went on to graduate with a Bachelor of Arts in Acting from the Italia Conti Academy of Theatre Arts in 2019.

== Career ==
At the age of 19, Simson competed in and won the fifth series of the Sky Living reality television competition Britain's Next Top Model in 2009. Shortly after winning, she landed her first cover photoshoot for the magazine Company. She went on to have gigs with Stella McCartney, Max Factor, and Debenhams, and appear in the Olly Murs music video "Oh My Goodness". In 2014, Simson was a finalist on the Beverly Hills-filmed series Model Turned Superstar. She was previously signed with Milk London and Q New York, and is currently signed with Established Models.

After graduating from drama school, Simson made a guest appearance in an episode of the Peacock science fiction series Brave New World in 2020. The following year, Simson joined the main cast of the Netflix adaptation of The Witcher for its second season as the elven sorceress Francesca Findabair.

== Personal life ==
Simson moved to London for her career and as of 2023, is based in Hornsey.

== Filmography ==
Year	Title	Role	Notes
2009	Britain's Next Top Model	Herself – Winner	Series 5
2014	Model Turned Superstar	Herself – Finalist	
2015	The Hunt	Laura	Miniseries
2015	He Who Has It All	Mel	Short film
2020	Brave New World	Alpha Woman One	Episode: "Firefall"
2021–present	The Witcher	Francesca Findabair	Main role (season 2–)
2022	My Sad, Angry Man	Dr Idida	Short film

=== Music video ===
- "Oh My Goodness" (2011), Olly Murs
