= Tiffany Pisani =

British-Maltese model

- Born: 20 January 1992 (age 34); Wolverhampton, England
- Occupation: Fashion model
- Height: 5 ft 11 in (1.80 m)
- Beauty pageant titleholder
- Title: Miss Universe Malta 2017
- Agency: Models 1 (International)
- Hair colour: Brown
- Eye colour: Blue
- Major competitions: Britain's Next Top Model (Winner) Miss Universe Malta 2017 (Winner); Miss Universe 2017 (Unplaced)

Tiffany Pisani (born 20 January 1992) is a British-Maltese model and beauty pageant titleholder who won Miss Universe Malta 2017 and also was announced as the winner of the cycle 6 of Britain's Next Top Model in October 2010. She represented Malta in Miss Universe 2017.

== Early career ==
In 2008, Pisani appeared in Maltese DJ Ruby's music video for "Living in The Dark". Since then she appeared on the covers of numerous Maltese magazines such as Sunday Circle, Tune In, Pink, Platinum Love, and Milkshake. In 2009, she achieved third place (second runner-up) in the annual Miss Maltese Islands competition.

== Britain's Next Top Model ==
Tiffany first came to the international public's attention by being the youngest candidate on sixth cycle of Britain's Next Top Model in 2010. During her time on the show, her edgy look was emphasized on when the show's host, Elle Macpherson, had her cut her trademark long hair into a pixie crop. Elimination rounds saw her receive one first call-out and two appearances in the bottom two. She also won three challenges. During the tenth episode, photographer Terry O'Neill praised Pisani as his favourite girl in the competition. On 4 October 2010, Pisani was announced the winner, beating strong competitor and eventual runner-up Alisha White and judges' favourite Joy McLaren.

== Miss Universe Malta 2017 ==
On 4 August 2017, Pisani was crowned Miss Universe Malta 2017 and represented Malta at the Miss Universe 2017 pageant but Unplaced.

== Personal life ==
Pisani was born in Wolverhampton, West Midlands, England, to a Maltese father and a British mother. She grew up in Attard, Malta, with her parents and her elder sister. English is her first language, but she attended a Maltese-language medium school where she attained fluency in Maltese. After winning Britain's Next Top Model Cycle 6, she has been based in London and has been working in Milan, Paris and Hong Kong.

Awards and achievements
Preceded by Martha Fenech	Miss Universe Malta; 2017	Succeeded by Francesca Mifsud
