= Alex Evans (model) =

English actress and model

Alexandra Evans
- Born: 18 August 1989 (age 36); Cranleigh, Surrey, England
- Occupations: Acting, modeling
- Years active: 2008–present
- Height: 5 ft 7 in (1.71 m)

Alexandra Emma Evans (born 18 August 1989) is an English actress and model.

== Modeling ==
In 2008, Evans was crowned winner of series 4 of Britain's Next Top Model, beating 13 other hopefuls. This led to modeling work, including a TV advert for Superdrug Barry M makeup in May 2010, a TV advert for the Nintendo Wii game Another Code R, and a Yeo Valley advertising campaign in October 2010. In 2013, she landed the Warehouse worldwide campaign "Style Me If You Can" in which she was the lead character in nine short films, directed by Danny Sangra.

== Acting ==
In April 2011, she appeared in the music video of "Down Down Down" by Charlie Simpson, a former member of Busted. Evans starred in her first professional role in the 2014 fantasy film Dragons of Camelot, in which she played Dindrane. She also landed a minor role in the film London Fields. Her other work includes features such as Soho Cigarette and The Thompsons. In 2015, she starred in the Hallmark Channel film Crown for Christmas. She has also done presenting work for the RBS Six Nations TV coverage. In December 2020, she appeared in an episode of the BBC soap opera Doctors as Zoe Ferris, alongside real-life husband John MacCormick, who portrayed Zoe's partner in the episode, Lincoln Brodie.

== Personal life ==
She currently lives in London. Previously, she attended Prior's Field School and Godalming College where she studied Theatre Studies, English Literature and Psychology A-level.
