= Britain's Next Top Model series 3 =

Britain's Next Top Model
- Season 3
- Judges: Lisa Snowdon; Paula Hamilton; Jonathan Phang
- No. of contestants: 12
- Winner: Lauren McAvoy
- No. of episodes: 10

Release
- Original network: Living
- Original release: 2 July – 3 September 2007

Series chronology
- ← Previous; Series 2 Next → Series 4

Britain's Next Top Model, Cycle 3 was the third cycle of Britain's Next Top Model and the third series aired on Living.

For this cycle the judges remained the same as they did during last series. The number of contestants was decreased to 12, the same number of contestants as Cycle 1. The opening credits received a makeover and the theme song was also changed.

The international destination for this cycle was Rio de Janeiro, Brazil. The winner's prize was management and representation by Models 1, a contract with Ruby & Millie Cosmetics and a cover and 6-page spread in Company Magazine.

The winner of the competition was 20-year-old Lauren McAvoy from Wickford, Essex.

Runner-up Louise Watts participated as a contestant on America's Next Top Model (season 18) along with six other former BNTM contestants. Watts quit the competition in the 3rd episode because she of the negative criticisms of the judges, particularly Kelly Cutrone who later posted a video mocking her after the episode's airing.

== Contestants ==
(ages stated are at start of contest)

Contestant	Age	Height	Hometown	Finish	Place
Dani Lawrence	20	1.75 m (5 ft 9 in)	Durham, England	Episode 1	12
Krystal Hancock	22	1.79 m (5 ft 10 1/2 in)	Swansea, Wales	Episode 2	11
Abigail Galatia	19	1.81 m (5 ft 11 1/2 in)	Cornwall, England	Episode 3	10
Natalie Nwagbo	22	1.80 m (5 ft 11 in)	London, England	Episode 4	9
Holly Alexander Ritchie	19	1.72 m (5 ft 7 1/2 in)	Glasgow, Scotland	Episode 5	8
Carly Thompson	18	1.77 m (5 ft 9 1/2 in)	Plymouth, England	Episode 6	7
Sherece Campbell	23	1.73 m (5 ft 8 in)	Sheffield, England	Episode 7	6
Lucy Bennett	20	1.73 m (5 ft 8 in)	Cheltenham, England	Episode 8	5
Stefanie Webber	20	1.78 m (5 ft 10 in)	West Sussex, England	Episode 9	4
Rebecca White	19	1.78 m (5 ft 10 in)	Manchester, England	Episode 10	3
Louise Watts	20	1.75 m (5 ft 9 in)	Canvey Island, England	Episode 10	2
Lauren McAvoy	20	1.73 m (5 ft 8 in)	Wickford, England	Episode 10	1

== Episodes ==
=== Week 1 ===
Original Airdate: 2 July 2007

The top 12 contestants immediately faced their first challenge posing in front of the press, and then met stylist Hilary Alexander who asked the contestants when they lost their virginity and what they think about unprotected sex. Later, they arrived in the model house and they ran around trying to choose rooms. Lauren, Sherece, Krystal, Carly, and Lucy were upset because they did not find beds for all of them (They eventually found beds downstairs).

The next morning, the contestants went to London Fashion Week. They met with top fashion designer, Nathan Jenden and were told they each had to model an outfit on the catwalk. Natalie won the fashion challenge and she chose Dani and Abigail to share the prize, which was attendance at a Gharani Strok Fashion Party. When they were home, they found Lisa Mail that explained the next photo shoot.

The photoshoot was a calendar-shoot with each model representing a different month. The photographer was impressed with Krystal and was pleased that Lucy did not seem to need any direction. Back at the house, tensions arose with a huge fight between Rebecca and Louise. Carly injured her foot in the photo shoot wearing extremely high shoes which resulted in her using crutches to walk during the elimination ceremony, though she cited a "skin infection" as the reason for this.

At judging panel, Lucy became the brightest contestant, as the judges loved her photo and it was unanimously considered gorgeous. Krystal also was praised for giving emotion to her photo, while Louise is praised for making her face really gorgeous. Natalie was praised for her ability to make her photo come alive, and Rebecca was praised for making her photo really work, with the help of the fan.

Stefanie's photo was loved by the judges, especially her hair and her pose, only if she can relax her face a bit more. Carly's photo was quite good, but she looked too painful in her photo. Both Sherece and Lauren's photo were criticised for not being alive in their photo, while Holly was praised for her face, but the rest of her photo was a disaster. Abigail and Dani ended up in bottom two, and Abigail was saved from elimination due to her good posture and is deemed to having more potential. Dani was eliminated because of her lack of personality in the photo shoot and the judges belief that she was not working hard enough.

- First call-out: Lucy Bennett
- Bottom two: Abigail Galatia & Dani Lawrence
- Eliminated: Dani Lawrence
- Featured photographer: Clive Arrowsmith
- Special guests: Hilary Alexander, Nathan Jenden

=== Week 2 ===
Original Airdate: 9 July 2007

The top 11 contestants took part in a catwalk challenge set by Otis Isles, the internationally respected casting director, model agent and fashion producer, who told them to dress in underwear. Carly did not participate in the challenge because she was in the hospital for her leg injury, for which she needed an antibiotic drip. Louise refused to walk in her underwear and she was unhappy with her figure, causing her to end up in tears trying to do it. The second part of the task was a special challenge where the girls had to walk on broken glass barefoot. Louise won the challenge and she chose Lauren and Natalie to be picked up in a Ferrari to go to the Dorchester Hotel for a cocktail party where they met JC Chasez. The losers returned home and were given the task of cleaning up the house.

The following day, the contestants went to the Daniel Galvin salon and they received their personalised makeovers and everyone is excited to see their new looks. Sherece and Rebecca end up in tears as they are initially unhappy with their short haircuts but they end up pleased with the results. Back at the house, an argument leaves Stefanie in floods of tears, when the contestants see a more negative side to her.

The photo shoot involved the contestants modelling outfits in a crane-held tube suspended 20–25 feet in the air. Stefanie claimed that she had Attention deficit hyperactivity disorder and does not take medication, however, the other contestants claimed she was just using this as an excuse for her rudeness and general bad attitude. Stefanie and Holly have an argument which in turn makes the other contestants confused about Stefanie. It was at this stage of the competition that the contestants were splitting into two groups. At judging, Lisa questioned Carly about the catwalk challenge she missed and is less than impressed with the walk she performs in front of the judges. The judges were confused about who will receive the first call-out, as the nominees are Lauren, Rebecca and Sherece that have a good shot. Christopher commented that Lauren and Sherece are a bit slow in the first but Rebecca was posing good strike in almost her shots, so the first call-out went to Rebecca. Ultimately, Krystal and Carly are in the bottom two for lackluster performances with Krystal being sent home for lacking passion, despite her great photo shoot the week before.

- First call-out: Rebecca White
- Bottom two: Carly Thompson & Krystal Hancock
- Eliminated: Krystal Hancock
- Featured photographer: Christopher Bissell
- Special Guests: Otis Isles, JC Chasez, James Galvin, Daniel Galvin

=== Week 3 ===
Original Airdate: 16 July 2007

The top 10 contestants arrive at the English National Ballet School where Lisa introduced the contestants to ballet teacher Louise Halliday. They are taught about the art of ballet to help them with their movement. Carly and Louise struggled to perform, with Louise's bad attitude being questioned.

They are taken to a skating rink to do ice skating catwalk style wearing fur. Stefanie won the challenge and she shared her reward with Rebecca, Sherece and Carly. They head to a spa, and use the opportunity to talk about the other contestants. Back at the house, the losers had to cook a four course dinner for the winners which they refused to eat. Carly's involvement causes a huge argument, mainly involving Stefanie and Louise.

The next day, they pose as Snow Queens for their photo shoot where they work with a male ballet dancer from the English National Ballet. Later that night, they arrive at a hotel where Jonathan introduced them to the self-proclaimed 'World's first supermodel', Janice Dickinson and they had performed their catwalk for her. Janice told Louise to change her walk because she was interfering with her dress but she refused. Janice also told Holly to take care of her hair, but at the end Janice told that the most impressive catwalk was Holly's catwalk.

At judging, Sherece was hostile to Janice which did not go down well with the judges. Louise received a good photo. However, Stefanie and Abigail landed in the bottom two. Stefanie is given another chance in the competition because the judges see potential in her, though she appears to be distracted by the presence of the other contestants. Abigail is sent home after not being able to photograph well.

- First call-out: Louise Watts
- Bottom two: Abigail Galatia & Stefanie Webber
- Eliminated: Abigail Galatia
- Featured photographer: J.P. Masclet
- Special guests: Louise Halliday, Lesley Goring, Janice Dickinson

=== Week 4 ===
Original Airdate: 23 July 2007

The top 9 contestants ordered a pizza where they found Lisa Mail for the challenge in the following morning. There is a huge fight between Stefanie and Louise. The contestants go to Pigalle Club where they met Caroline Reid and are told they have to perform stand-up comedy in front of an audience. Lucy and Holly's characters impress in the stand-up comedy club. Holly wins the challenge and chooses Lucy and Natalie to share the prize: they go and watch the musical, Wicked with the tickets of said musical included in her prize.

Contestant	Character	Airline
Carly	Donna	EasyJet
Holly	Chantal Jemeladonne	Air France
Lauren	Sarah	Virgin Atlantic
Louise	Lily	Singapore Airlines
Lucy	Conchita Rosa María González Gómez	Iberia
Natalie	Mona	British Airways
Rebecca	Vespa	Alitalia
Sherece	Helga	Lufthansa
Stefanie	Valerie	American Airlines

Back at the house, the other contestants played truth or dare involving putting condiments on themselves but they do not do any 'truths'. They go to east London for an acting class which involved standing in front of a mirror and not able to see themselves. Stefanie started to cry when describing her own father. The contestants reach a truce and begin to get along.

The next day, they have a 1950s photo shoot as different revenge-seeking housewives, the contestants take the following roles:

Contestant	Revenge
Carly	Damaging the car
Holly	Castrating husband
Lauren	Scratching records
Louise	Baking a poisoned cake
Lucy	Making food filled with razorblades
Natalie	Stabbing
Rebecca	Burning her husband with an iron
Sherece	Catches her husband cheating with another man
Stefanie	Setting the house on fire

At judging panel, most of the contestants criticised by the judges. Carly and Louise received positive feedback from the judges, both of them produce the strongest and the most evil photo of the week. Rebecca, Sherece, Holly, and Lucy each produce admirable photo, while the other three, Stefanie, Lauren and Natalie was heavily criticised for producing such dreadful photo.

Carly's photo was universally praised, as Paula commenting that is "a pleasure to looking at" for Carly's picture. Louise's photo was also praised, as the judges very impressed with her success in blending evil and sexiness. Rebecca, even looked boring in her picture but she still looked beautiful. Sherece come very alive in her photo, while Lucy's beauty once again saves her from producing dreadful photo.

Lisa said that she loves Holly's photo, but Pam Ann said she "can't find Holly in her photo". Stefanie was heavily criticised in her photo, and so as Lauren and Natalie. In the end, Lauren came in bottom two along with Natalie. Lauren was saved from elimination but she is shocked to stay the competition. Natalie is sent home after not being able to prove that she is more than just a catwalk model.

- First call-out: Carly Thompson
- Bottom two: Lauren McAvoy & Natalie Nwagbo
- Eliminated: Natalie Nwagbo
- Featured photographer: John Paul Pietrus
- Special guests: Pam Ann, Adam Garcia, Geoff Colman

=== Week 5 ===
Original Airdate: 30 July 2007

The top 8 contestants taken to Debenhams to get the chance to meet Caprice. They are given fifteen minutes to find an outfit for different occasions. Carly's walk was proven the worst. Holly, Rebecca and Stefanie were given a set of lingeries. Back at the house where Holly, Lucy and Louise were very loud and played Bean bags which caused Stefanie to shout and yell at them to "shut up" four times as she was trying to sleep.

The next day, the contestants find Lisa Mail along with their personal luggages. They go to Finishing Academy to meet with the etiquette coach, Jill Pollitt for a luncheon challenge on etiquette behaviour and being a lady. Jill asked the contestants to invite a lunch with the guys. Rebecca won the challenge and as part of her prize, invited Sherece to join her to go to Harrods along with two guys they picked. They choose to eat Ice cream.

The next day, they met with Paula; their photoshoot is modelling diamonds – nude. During the photo shoot, Paula asked Lauren to cut her long hair. Holly struggled to start posing nude so Paula stripped off in front of the cameras to comfort her and offer encouragement and giving tips. Back at the house, Lauren was very depressed and she decided to cut her hair into shoulder length cut.

At judging, Lauren showed the offcuts of her hair to Lisa. Stefanie and Sherece were praised for having a good photo (In this episode, only Rebecca, Lucy, and Louise's pictures that was fully shown. The others was blurred and for Stefanie, her picture is only shown the head because she perform naked and standing in a mirror in her picture). Carly lands in the bottom two again along with Holly. Carly is saved from elimination and given her last chance; Holly was sent home for not showing enough desire to be a model.

- First call-out: Stefanie Webber
- Bottom two: Carly Thompson & Holly Alexander Ritchie
- Eliminated: Holly Alexander Ritchie
- Featured photographer: Uli Weber
- Special guests: Caprice, Jill Pollitt, Jonathan Tiby, Timothy Cole, Mohamed Al-Fayed

=== Week 6 ===
Original Airdate: 6 August 2007

The top 7 contestants arrive at a bar where they meet music video director Paul Hills. They have to star in a music video along with The Wolfmen as their challenge. Louise throws a tantrum because of her outfit but eventually pulls it together and joins in with the dancing. The video producers were impressed with the final result, and Lauren, Rebecca and Lucy were announced the winners of the challenge. Their prize is to record a rock song. Back at the house, the remaining contestants got to call their loved ones back at home. Carly received her cards and a photo of her boyfriend back at home.

They had a casting in Gharani Strok for a runway. The contestants had good walks and posture, with the exception of Carly.

The next day, the contestants have a photo shoot for Mamas & Papas. The theme is motherhood, between pregnancy and birth as their photo shoot. Lisa arrived at the middle of the photo shoot and the contestants are surprised learn they will be working with babies for the second part of the photoshoot. All were excited at the prospect but the shoot made Rebecca homesick as she missed her daughter back at home.

Following the photo shoot, Sherece celebrated her birthday and they had a party. Carly dressed as a male stripper and the other girls were playing with pillow. During deliberation, the contestants saw The Wolfmen's music video and they enjoyed it.

At the judging panel, The only contestants that received overwhelmingly positive feedback was Rebecca and Lauren. Rebecca successfully making her photo looks believable while Lauren's belief of herself comes through the shot. The rest of the contestants was received mixed to negative feedback. Both of Stefanie and Lucy received positive feedback, but also negative feedback for too exposing themselves and forgetting the baby.

Sherece, on the other hand was praised for her photo but the judges thought that the shot is all about her and the baby was totally forgettable. Louise failed to make her photo look believable and did not connect to the baby, while Carly's lack of looks that make the baby look terrified also did not impress the judges. The latter joined the bottom two with Louise. Carly ran out of chances and was sent home.

- First call-out: Rebecca White
- Bottom two: Carly Thompson & Louise Watts
- Eliminated: Carly Thompson
- Featured photographer: Kevin Peschke
- Special guests: Paul Hills, The Wolfmen, Darren Hau, Eric Jimenez, Tilly Hardy, Roy Gayle, Johnny De'Ath, Reuben Shaljean, Nargess Gharani, Vanya Strok, Miguel Bascones, Elaine Welch

=== Week 7 ===
Original Airdate: 13 August 2007

The top 6 contestants are woken up with a grueling morning workout from Celebrity Personal Trainer, Nicki Waterman. Some contestants struggled in workout especially Sherece. This activity was followed by a fake grilling and interview from The Sun journalist Victoria Newton who taught them how to deal with reporters.

The day is not over yet, they have a dinner with Joan Rivers and agents from Models 1 who brought a table full of her QVC jewellery as gifts for the contestants. After the guests left, another fight breaks out.

At the house, Lisa introduces the general manager of Wonderbra UK for their challenge. The contestants are required to shoot and pose for a Wonderbra commercial. Stefanie won the challenge and took Louise, Rebecca and Sherece with her to a celebrity filled party at Café Royal whereas Lauren and Lucy have to work as bartenders for a party. The winners arrived at the party and meet celebrities like Lisa Scott-Lee, Keisha Buchanan, and two men from the salon – as well as a David Bowie lookalike. Stefanie got all loved-up from Guy Burnet and Stuart Manning from Hollyoaks.

This week's photoshoot was "Superheroes with the new Vauxhall Tigra". The contestants are suspended on wire over the car. Stefanie told to the staff and was bored about meeting Guy and she was so fabulous to him and she has already a boyfriend. At judging, Louise has the best photo while Stefanie and Sherece landed in bottom two. Stefanie was almost eliminated but her challenge win saves her and Sherece was sent home for lack of Versatility and a bad photo, despite her previous best shoots.

- First call-out: Louise Watts
- Bottom two: Sherece Campbell & Stefanie Webber
- Eliminated: Sherece Campbell
- Featured photographer: Lars H
- Special guests: Nicki Waterman, Victoria Newton, Joan Rivers, Mark Evans, Max Clifford, Debbie Rix, Guy Burnet, Stuart Manning, Shelley Perkins

=== Week 8 ===
Original Airdate: 20 August 2007

The top 5 contestants arrived at Models 1 and they met Mark Evans along with casting agents where they took a polaroid shot for a casting. Mark announced that they would be going to Rio de Janeiro, Brazil, but there are only four places on the plane. When they returned at the house, they were surprised when Lisa was there and they were told about the trip to Rio.

They arrived at London's East End for vintage shopping. Later, they had a go-see challenge for a casting with Company Magazine where they met the editor Victoria White. Some girls could not remember the names of the photographers in the last photo shoots. Lauren, Rebecca and Stefanie were treated to their own room at the Savoy Hotel and having video messages from home for impressing the judges most.

For the photoshoot this week, the contestants had to pose underwater for a Firefly Tonics commercial whilst trying to deliver a tranquil, soothing and refreshing picture. Lucy had trouble with deep water and had panic problems throughout the shoot. Stefanie was genuinely afraid until she got under the water and started posing like she did not have a problem.

At the judging panel, Rebecca's photo was universally praised and she was announced as the commercial of Firefly Tonics. The other girls' photo did not receive praise as Rebecca's photo did. The first call-out ultimately went to, of course, Rebecca and she booked the first seat to Rio. Lauren was very shocked and happy when she was called as the second best shot, because at the judging panel, her photo is criticised by Jonathan and Victoria as it was looked "a bit strange and a bit pain" (while on the other way, Paula was like it). However, her impressive challenge win meant that Lauren booked the second seat to Rio.

Stefanie, also shocked, is revealed to have booked the third seat to Rio. Her shoot was also universally criticised as she looked drowned in her photo, rather than looking beautiful. It is revealed that she became the third contestant to go to Rio due to her challenge win. Louise and Lucy "drowned" into the bottom two. Louise, once again is criticised for her attitude problem, but she has been producing some beautiful photos. Lucy is eliminated due to her less than consistent work, fear of deep water and looks more actress-y rather than a model while Louise books the fourth and final seat to Rio.

- First call-out: Rebecca White
- Bottom two: Louise Watts & Lucy Bennett
- Eliminated: Lucy Bennett
- Featured photographer: Candice Farmer
- Special guests: Mark Evans, Alice Gibson, Debbie Jones, Victoria White, Harry Briggs

=== Week 9 ===
Original Airdate: 27 August 2007

The top 4 contestants arrive in Rio and excitedly explore the luxurious villa they will be staying in. On a rare day off, the girls are driven to Ipanema to play Beach Volleyball with local guys and in the evening are joined for dinner by Lisa. Rebecca tearfully explains that she struggles with life as a single mother, so is upset when her closest ally in house, Stefanie, appears to be sniggering as she speaks. Stefanie is reprimanded by Lisa, but she refuses to apologise to Rebecca, stating she does not regret anything she has said or done.

The next day, Paula introduces the contestants to a famous Brazilian photographer for a carnival-inspired photo shoot, featuring some challenging and uncomfortable costumes. Stefanie and Lauren both find the shoot hard-going, while Louise warms to the task and produces the strongest photo.

The following day the contestants have to learn a small piece of Portuguese dialogue for a casting with a Brazilian Soap opera, Calor Na Praia which translates as 'Hot on the Beach'. Each girl has to passionately kiss then slap the male actor in the scene. Lauren finds the task difficult, worried about her boyfriend at home, while Stefanie struggles to develop a convincing Brazilian accent. Rebecca wins the challenge and takes Louise on a boat cruise/picnic, while the other two contestants have to sell iced tea on the beach. In judging panel, Stefanie and Lauren end up in the bottom two. Lauren is told she needs to lose her self-consciousness and fully commit to all tasks, but is ultimately saved and takes her place in the top three. Stefanie reaches her third strike and is eliminated.

- First call-out: Louise Watts
- Bottom two: Lauren McAvoy & Stefanie Webber
- Eliminated: Stefanie Webber
- Featured photographer: Murillo Meirelles
- Special guest: Fernanda Nakamura

=== Week 10 ===
Original Airdate: 3 September 2007

The top three contestants are sent to Sugar Loaf Mountain in a cable car to learn Samba dancing. Lauren wins the challenge. They have a swimwear photo shoot on the beach, with each contestant posing seductively with a male model. Louise performs well, although is criticised by the photographer because of her weight. Rebecca struggles however, feeling insecure about her body. In judging, the judges praise Louise's performance during the week and she received another first call-out. Louise broke the record of Cycle 1's winner Lucy Ratcliffe for the most first call-outs in a season with four.

Lauren and Rebecca land in the bottom two. Despite it being her first appearance in the bottom 2, Rebecca is eliminated due to having the same facial expression in every photograph.

- First call-out: Louise Watts
- Bottom two: Lauren McAvoy & Rebecca White
- Eliminated: Rebecca White
- Featured photographer: Emmanuelle Bernard

The finalists have a final runway challenge from a top Brazilian fashion designer, Eliza Conde. On the catwalk, Lauren remains focused, whereas Louise receives some criticism for being more casual and unprofessional. At judging the finalists tear up as they say why each of them should be Britain's Next Top Model. Louise thanks the judges for seeing past her weight and 'for seeing me' instead. The judges discuss the finalist's progress throughout the show, praising many of Louise's photographs, whilst criticising many of Lauren's. But they also discuss Lauren's improvement throughout the show, her professionalism and her impressive runway catwalk. In a very shocking twist, the finalists are called back and the plasma screen reveals Lauren to be Britain's Next Top Model.

Note: Lauren becomes the first winner of Top Model franchise to have never been called first in during a judging.

- Final two: Lauren McAvoy & Louise Watts
- Britain's Next Top Model: Lauren McAvoy
- Special guests: Lucinha Nobre, Felipe Veloso

== Results ==
Order	Episode										
Order	1	2	3	4	5	6	7	8	9	10	
1	Lucy	Rebecca	Louise	Carly	Stefanie	Rebecca	Louise	Rebecca	Louise	Louise	Lauren
2	Krystal	Sherece	Lucy	Louise	Sherece	Lauren	Rebecca	Lauren	Rebecca	Lauren	Louise
3	Louise	Lauren	Carly	Rebecca	Lucy	Stefanie	Lauren	Stefanie	Lauren	Rebecca	
4	Natalie	Natalie	Lauren	Sherece	Lauren	Lucy	Lucy	Louise	Stefanie		
5	Rebecca	Louise	Holly	Lucy	Louise	Sherece	Stefanie	Lucy			
6	Stefanie	Lucy	Rebecca	Stefanie	Rebecca	Louise	Sherece				
7	Carly	Holly	Sherece	Holly	Carly	Carly					
8	Sherece	Abigail	Natalie	Lauren	Holly						
9	Lauren	Stefanie	Stefanie	Natalie							
10	Holly	Carly	Abigail								
11	Abigail	Krystal									
12	Dani										

The contestant won the challenge
The contestant was eliminated
The contestant won the competition

=== Average call-out order ===
Final two is not included.

Rank by average	Place	Model	Call-out total	Number of call-outs	Call-out average
1	2	Louise	29	10	2.90
2	3	Rebecca	30	10	3.00
3	5	Lucy	30	8	3.75
4	1	Lauren	40	10	4.00
5	6	Sherece	34	7	4.86
6	4	Stefanie	46	9	5.11
7	7	Carly	35	6	5.83
8	9	Natalie	25	4	6.25
9	11	Krystal	13	2	6.50
10	8	Holly	37	5	7.40
11	10	Abigail	29	3	9.67
12	12	Dani	12	1	12.00

=== Bottom two ===
Episode	Contestants	Eliminated
1	Abigail & Dani	Dani
2	Carly & Krystal	Krystal
3	Abigail & Stefanie	Abigail
4	Lauren & Natalie	Natalie
5	Carly & Holly	Holly
6	Carly & Louise	Carly
7	Sherece & Stefanie	Sherece
8	Lucy & Louise	Lucy
9	Lauren & Stefanie	Stefanie
10	Lauren & Rebecca	Rebecca
10	Lauren & Louise	Louise

The contestant was eliminated after her first time in the bottom two
The contestant was eliminated after her second time in the bottom two
The contestant was eliminated after her third time in the bottom two
The contestant was eliminated in the final judging and placed as the runner-up

== Ratings ==
Episode Viewing figures from BARB

Episode	Date	Total Viewers	Living Weekly Ranking
1	2 July 2007	261,000	5
2	9 July 2007	343,000	2
3	16 July 2007	299,000	3
4	23 July 2007	316,000	2
5	30 July 2007	330,000	2
6	6 August 2007	340,000	2
7	13 August 2007	282,000	3
8	20 August 2007	351,000	2
9	27 August 2007	340,000	2
10	3 September 2007	319,000	3
