= Britain's Next Top Model series 2 =

Britain's Next Top Model
- Season 2
- Judges: Lisa Snowdon; Paula Hamilton; Jonathan Phang
- No. of contestants: 13
- Winner: Lianna Fowler
- No. of episodes: 10

Release
- Original network: LIVINGtv
- Original release: 24 July – 25 September 2006

Series chronology
- ← Previous; Series 1 Next → Series 3

Britain's Next Top Model, Cycle 2 was the second cycle of Britain's Next Top Model and the second series aired on LIVINGtv.

The cast was increased to 13 contestants. The international destination was Marrakesh, Morocco. The prize was a contract management and representation by Models 1, an advertising campaign in Ford Fiesta and a cover and 6-page spread of Company Magazine.

Lisa Snowdon became the host of this cycle after previous host Lisa Butcher left the show due to her wooden performance in the previous cycle. Also, Marie Helvin was replaced with Paula Hamilton. Jonathan Phang remains as a judge.

The winner was 18-year-old Lianna Fowler from Derby. Runner-up Abbey Clancy was revealed to be the host of the show for Cycles 10-12.

Second runner-up Jasmia Robinson participated as a contestant on America's Next Top Model, Cycle 18 along with six other former BNTM contestants. Robinson came 14th and was eliminated in the 1st episode.

== Contestants ==
(ages stated are at start of contest)

Contestant	Age	Height	Hometown	Finish	Place
Yvette Stubbs	19	1.74 m (5 ft 8 1/2 in)	West Sussex, England	Episode 1	13
Nina Malone	23	1.76 m (5 ft 9 1/2 in)	Cambridge, England	Episode 2	12
Asha Hibbert	20	1.82 m (5 ft 11 1/2 in)	Yorkshire, England	Episode 3	11
Lucy Flower	25	1.71 m (5 ft 7 1/2 in)	Sheffield, England	Episode 4	10
Sophia Price	20	1.80 m (5 ft 11 in)	Hemel Hempstead, England	Episode 5	9
Samantha Gerrard	20	1.78 m (5 ft 10 in)	Newport, Wales	Episode 6	8
Tamar Higgs	23	1.75 m (5 ft 9 in)	Kent, England	Episode 7	7-6
Georgina Edewor-Thorley	19	1.77 m (5 ft 9 1/2 in)	Marylebone, England	Episode 7	7-6
Sarah Butler	20	1.77 m (5 ft 9 1/2 in)	Surrey, England	Episode 8	5
Amber Niemann	19	1.80 m (5 ft 11 in)	Pembrokeshire, Wales	Episode 9	4
Jasmia Robinson	18	1.73 m (5 ft 8 in)	Highgate, England	Episode 10	3
Abbey Clancy	20	1.73 m (5 ft 8 in)	Woolton, England	Episode 10	2
Lianna Fowler	18	1.80 m (5 ft 11 in)	Derby, England	Episode 10	1

== Episodes ==
=== Week 1 ===
Original Airdate: 24 July 2006

The competition begins. The top 13 contestants arrived and they proceed to Cafe De Paris where they meet the new host, Lisa Snowdon, and the judges. The contestants also meet Hilary Alexander, a stylist who tells them to have a runway walk where they have to wear underwear and formal outfits for a backstage tour along with the judges. They arrived in the model house and they have a tour of the entire house for some excitement.

The contestants have an early call to Milton Keynes SnowZone for their first photo shoot, where they are forced to withstand temperatures as low as −5 °C (23 °F) whilst wearing bikinis. Abbey feels that her breasts are quite large compared to the other contestants. Yvette failed to impress in her look.

The next day, the contestants went to a military camp to compete an obstacle course. Some contestants struggled in obstacle training while Yvette suffers a scar in her leg. Asha won the obstacle course challenge and she chose 4 friends to join her (Nina, Samantha, Sarah and Sophia) on a shopping spree and to get a cocktail at The Waldorf Hilton Hotel London. Immediately Lianna feels like an outsider, not getting along with the other girls. During the deliberation, Sarah and Tamar were praised for their photos and especially for their runway walks. Jasmia and Yvette are in the bottom two, Jasmia for her poor photo ability, and Yvette for showing low self-esteem and for having a terrible photo. Jasmia was spared, and Yvette became the contestant girl to be sent home.

- First call-out: Sarah Butler
- Bottom two: Jasmia Robinson & Yvette Stubbs
- Eliminated: Yvette Stubbs
- Featured photographer: Nicky Johnston
- Special guest: Hilary Alexander

=== Week 2 ===
Original Airdate: 31 July 2006

The top 12 contestants arrived at Brighton & Hove Dog Track where they met Michelle Paradise for a catwalk lesson. They wore garbage bags to learn how to deal with distractions on the catwalk and walk dogs down a makeshift runway on the track. Jasmia won the challenge and chose 4 contestants (Tamar, Lucy, Lianna & Amber) for a dinner treat back at the house. The losers have to serve them as dishwashers, waitresses and assistant chefs with celebrity chef Ian Pengelley cooking food for the winners. They had an ice cream disaster and it fell on the floor many times while Abbey throws a tantrum.

The next day, the contestants were paired up in the following six groups to pose for a 1940s inspired, B&W homme and femme photo shoot:

Pairs
Abbey & Sarah
Amber & Jasmia
Asha & Samantha
Georgina & Lucy
Lianna & Nina
Sophia & Tamar

During the photo shoot, Nina appeared topless and she didn't help Lianna when Lianna couldn't choose her trousers. The following day after the photo shoot, they got their makeovers and there were inevitable tears. Sophia realised that her hair wasn't Strawberry Blonde; Tamar was shocked when her hair was dyed brown. Lianna said that Sophia didn't like her cut or colour at all and that she felt like an old woman. Sophia tried to convince Lisa that she really liked it and that she was pleased, despite being in tears.

During the judging panel, Most of the girls excelled, with good photos. Samantha improved her walk but not her photo shoot. Nina's photo wasn't sensual enough and was too aggressive. Lianna also looked bad and bland, with no expression in her eyes during the photo shoot. Both Nina and Lianna were in bottom two, having been considered the worst in the bunch, but the judges felt that Lianna's face was striking thus she was saved from elimination. Nina was eliminated from the competition.

- First call-out: Sophia Price
- Bottom two: Lianna Fowler & Nina Malone
- Eliminated: Nina Malone
- Featured photographer: Uli Weber
- Special guests: Michelle Paradise, Ian Pengelley, Peter Grey

=== Week 3 ===
Original Airdate: 7 August 2006

The top 11 contestants went to 20th Century Theater to learn cheesecake pin-up and dancing from Britain's own 'Queen of Burlesque' Immodesty Blaize where they have to learn seductive moves. Amber in particular struggles in the challenge. Later at the house, they have a cocktail party to relax, and the contestants host their own 'Oscar Night'.

The contestants head to a manor for a perfume commercial set from casting director Beth Charkham. They have to go underwater in the pool along with male model and recite the perfume's tagline in French: "Alors, est-ce que tu m'aimes?" ("So do you love me?"). Tamar feels that her first commercial is very difficult. Georgina and Amber had to face their fear of deep water. Amber and Lucy received harsh criticism for their commercials but Abbey won the challenge. Abbey picks Samantha, Sophia and Georgina for their prize – an evening outfit for dinner in a top London restaurant. After, they proceed to a club for a dance, along with two male models. Tensions rise between Lianna and Asha about their efforts in the competition.

The next day, they met Hilary for facing a burlesque photo shoot theme. At the elimination panel, Abbey was told that she had the best picture of the week, Lianna's improvement in both shoot and personality was commended and so as Lucy's good photo shoot which Blaize said she look like a "beautiful China Doll". Asha's commercial got a laugh for her side mouth kiss with the male model, but Jonathan told her that her pose was undignified and unfeminine. She found herself in the bottom two along with Amber. Amber's beauty didn't come through in her pictures but she was given another chance, and Asha was eliminated.

- First call-out: Abbey Clancy
- Bottom two: Asha Hibbert & Amber Niemann
- Eliminated: Asha Hibbert
- Featured photographer: Mike Owen
- Special guests: Immodesty Blaize, Beth Charkham, Hilary Alexander

=== Week 4 ===
Original Airdate: 14 August 2006

The top 10 contestants learned about ballroom dancing from top ballroom dancer Brendan Cole but Lianna struggles to perform because, as she states, she is much more accustomed to doing sports like football. Then they do a full dance with music. Tamar, who had prior dance training, excelled, winning the challenge. She selected Jasmia and Lucy to have a dinner in Oxo Hotel with Brendan as her reward.

The following day, the contestants are taken to Lucie Clayton Academy and they have to dress like women. They met a teacher for an etiquette class and some modelling tips.

The next day, they face to do an Appletiser commercial photo shoot where casting director Jonathan Clayton told the contestants that they were jumping on a trampoline with a bottle. Later at the house, tension began when Lianna cried that she didn't know how to dance, annoying the other contestants. She ended up sleeping downstairs, away from the other contestants.

At panel, Lianna received rave reviews for her trampoline photo, though Lisa said that her walk was stiff and awkward. Sarah and Amber are praised for having their best photos so far. Tamar's photo got mixed reviews, and she landed in the bottom two, along with Lucy. Tamar's challenge win saved her, and Lucy was eliminated for not being versatile enough.

- First call-out: Sarah Butler
- Bottom two: Lucy Flower & Tamar Higgs
- Eliminated: Lucy Flower
- Featured photographer: Omer Knaz
- Special guests: Brendan Cole, Jean Broke-Smith, Ron Smith, Jonathan Clayton

=== Week 5 ===
Original Airdate: 21 August 2006

The top 9 were taken to Destination Gym where they train with personal trainer Chris Mundle, with Sophia struggling to keep up in the workout. Then straight after training, the girls were divided into groups of two and put into separate cars for a go-see challenge for a clothing company without the chance to shower after their workout. The next day, they went to a salon for a makeup challenge. Jasmia won the challenge; her prize was an Urban Decay makeup kit and a helicopter ride around London. She chose Amber to go with her.

In the middle of the night, they went to a dungeon for facing a Gothic Bride photo shoot and they were taken in a crypt. Hilary showed the contestants some ornate necklace to wear them in their shoot. The majority of the contestants struggled to get a good shot but Lianna and Tamar are praised for their performances.

The next morning, Jasmia celebrated her birthday and told the contestants she didn't want to spend it with all of them. She watched a home video from her parents back at home. Lisa surprised her for a dinner and she chose 5 friends (Lianna, Amber, Sarah, Tamar and Georgina) to go to Shanghai Blues. Later they have a club party, whilst the other three contestants had some fun and play.

During the judging panel, Lianna, Tamar and Amber were universally praised for their photo's, Sarah was criticized for having the worst photo of the week, Paula castigated Georgina poorly for looking cheap and Sophia's photo was labeled weak again. The judges told Abbey that she looked okay in her photo and she wasn't convincing in editorial shots. She landed in the bottom two with Sophia, but Sophia was eliminated from the competition due to a weak portfolio.

- First call-out: Lianna Fowler
- Bottom two: Abbey Clancy & Sophia Price
- Eliminated: Sophia Price
- Featured photographer: Julian Marshall
- Special guests: Chris Mundle, Neil Cunningham, Scott Henshall, Eric Jimenez, Hilary Alexander

=== Week 6 ===
Original Airdate: 28 August 2006

The top 8 contestants went to a studio where they had a heavy metallic make-up photo shoot. Jasmia struggled with the shoot, feeling self-conscious. Sarah was very worried that she didn't show enough personality in her picture. Lisa then visited the contestants at the house, and they were asked to critique their weaknesses to each other, which caused even more fights.

The contestants went to Heart 106.2 FM radio station and they met radio presenter Toby Anstis for an interview and learned how to answer embarrassing questions. The judges thought Lianna had a good attitude and also quite a striking look. Amber and Samantha had good interviews and they won their challenges. Amber picked Jasmia, while Samantha picked Abbey for a Luxury Spa Treatment reward.

The contestants found the Lisa Mail, where they learned they had to create portfolios in Southend-on-Sea and split into four groups. When they returned to the house, Celebrity Photographer Nicky Johnston and Models 1 director Karen Diamond visited the house to discuss their portfolios.

At the judging panel, Abbey got some good marks for her photo and impressed the judges. Tamar and Amber were praised for having the best photos. Samantha and Sarah ended up in bottom two. Sarah's photo was considered very stiff, but ultimately Samantha was eliminated because she didn't stand out in her pictures.

- First call-out: Tamar Higgs
- Bottom two: Samantha Gerrard & Sarah Butler
- Eliminated: Samantha Gerrard
- Featured photographer: John Swannell
- Special guests: Toby Anstis, Nicky Johnston, Karen Diamond

=== Week 7 ===
Original Airdate: 4 September 2006

The top 7 contestants shot a thirty-second jewellery promotion commercial for QVC with top promo director Jason Clifford. Back in the house, Cycle 1 winner Lucy Ratcliffe visited and gave the contestants some tips. They interviewed her about her life as a model.

The following day, the contestants had a fake press conference for selling a new lip gloss product. Later, they arrived at Company Magazine headquarters, where they met the magazine's editor Victoria White. Jasmia won the conference challenge and picked Tamar with her to meet Christian Slater in Garrick Theatre at his stage play One Flew Over The Cuckoo's Nest.

The next day, they had a country life photo shoot. Jasmia, Amber and Abbey had good photos. During the judging panel, Sarah and Abbey were impressive in the thirty second commercial. Lisa said that millions of home viewers would see the commercial. The judges decided in a split decision to eliminate two girls this week.

In the end, Tamar and Georgina were in the bottom two and were both eliminated when Lisa pulled out a blank photo, shocking the remaining girls. Tamar was sent home due to her inability to hide her large legs in pictures; Georgina was sent home because her face didn't photograph well.

- First call-out: Jasmia Robinson
- Bottom two / Eliminated: Georgina Edewor-Thorley & Tamar Higgs
- Featured photographer: James Martin
- Special guests: Jason Clifford, Gemma Hatton, Lucy Ratcliffe, Victoria White, Christian Slater

=== Week 8 ===
Original Airdate: 11 September 2006

With another two contestants gone, the house became even more divided. Abbey saw a Lisa Mail above personal luggages. The contestants met top style expert Saffron Aldridge, who mercilessly went through their wardrobes. They had a one-on-one with Lisa, and some girls took the opportunity to bring other contestants down.

The contestants had a photo shoot where they had to cover each other with paint along with a Ford Fiesta. Later, they had a group photo shoot which some saw as an opportunity for revenge. Later that night, the contestants arrived at Pelham Hotel and found seven people seating in a dining hall. Jonathan was waiting to meet model Jerry Hall for dinner. The next day, they had a go-see challenge with their portfolios. Lianna won the go-see challenge for her strong portfolio. Lianna chose Sarah to join her at the premiere of Confetti as the reward for winning the challenge, and both contestants who surprised when Lisa joined them.

During the judging panel, Lisa announced the girls would be going to Marrakesh, Morocco, for the remainder of the competition, but there was only room for four of them. Amber's improvement was noted, and she was sent to Marrakesh, along with Abbey and Jasmia. Lianna and Sarah found themselves in the bottom two, both for the second time, with the judges doubting their desire to become models. In the end, Lianna's unique face and superior portfolio earned her the last place on the plane to Marrakesh, and Sarah was sent home.

- First call-out: Amber Niemann
- Bottom two: Lianna Fowler & Sarah Butler
- Eliminated: Sarah Butler
- Featured photographer: Lee Jenkins
- Special guests: Saffron Aldridge, Fiona Pargeter, Jerry Hall, Elspeth Gibson

=== Week 9 ===
Original Airdate: 18 September 2006

The top four contestants flew to Marrakesh and arrived at their villa, where they would stay for the remainder of the competition. Lisa gave them the day off, and they headed to Nikki Beach where they participated in activities along with local guys.

The contestants went to Souk where they have a challenge to find an outfit for Lisa. They were split into two groups (Abbey and Lianna, Jasmia and Amber) to buy the outfits. Abbey and Lianna won the challenge and they spent time in Moroccan spa and massage while the losers cooked vegetables for the winners. Back at the villa, tensions arose when Abbey and Jasmia had a big argument that continued on into the next morning.

The contestants arrived in a rural desert area for their photoshoot. Jasmia and Abbey had the strongest photos, and both advanced to the next round. Lianna found herself in the bottom two again, along with Amber. Lianna was saved from elimination, and Amber was sent home due to her inability to move well in pictures and her general lack of expression.

- First call-out: Jasmia Robinson
- Bottom two: Amber Niemann & Lianna Fowler
- Eliminated: Amber Niemann
- Featured photographer: Nicky Johnston
- Special guest: Ahmed

=== Week 10 ===
Original Airdate: 25 September 2006

The top three contestants were surprised when they had to learn how to Belly Dance from Noor, a local performer. They wore belly dancing costumes to a Moroccan restaurant, where they had to perform their dances for the judges. Abbey won the challenge; her prize was a computer phone decorated with pink Swarovski crystals.

The next day, Lisa introduced the contestants to Moroccan fashion designer Djellaba, and the contestants learned two of them would be wearing Djellaba's designs on the catwalk. Later that day, they went to Souk for their final photo shoot. Lianna cried during the shoot because the pressure was getting to her. Jasmia was not impressed with Lianna's breakdown, thinking it was unprofessional. During the judging panel, the three got good feedback for their photos, and Lianna was told that her photo was her best so far. The judges had a difficult time making a decision, but in the end Abbey and Jasmia landed in the bottom two. Jasmia was eliminated for having a one-note look.

- First call-out: Lianna Fowler
- Bottom two: Abbey Clancy & Jasmia Robinson
- Eliminated: Jasmia Robinson
- Featured photographer: Jim Marks

The finalists arrived in a Marrakesh palace to compete in a Moroccan fashion runway show. On the catwalk, they both had good walks and impressed the judges. During the final panel, the judges discussed the finalists' performance in the competition. Lianna's walk was considered slightly stiff, but her photographs were praised. The judges felt that Abbey's walk was quite good, and that she had improved a lot from the start of the competition. After a tough decision, the finalists were called back and it was revealed that Lianna was Britain's Next Top Model.

- Final two: Abbey Clancy & Lianna Fowler
- Britain's Next Top Model: Lianna Fowler
- Special guests: Noor Talbi, Kenza Melehi, Evelyn

== Results ==
Order	Episode										
Order	1	2	3	4	5	6	7	8	9	10	
1	Sarah	Sophia	Abbey	Sarah	Lianna	Tamar	Jasmia	Amber	Jasmia	Lianna	Lianna
2	Tamar	Jasmia	Lianna	Amber	Tamar	Amber	Abbey	Jasmia	Abbey	Abbey	Abbey
3	Georgina	Lucy	Lucy	Lianna	Amber	Jasmia	Lianna	Abbey	Lianna	Jasmia	
4	Lianna	Asha	Sarah	Georgina	Jasmia	Abbey	Amber	Lianna	Amber		
5	Lucy	Tamar	Georgina	Samantha	Samantha	Georgina	Sarah	Sarah			
6	Nina	Georgina	Tamar	Abbey	Sarah	Lianna	Georgina; Tamar				
7	Amber	Abbey	Jasmia	Sophia	Georgina	Sarah	Georgina; Tamar				
8	Samantha	Amber	Sophia	Jasmia	Abbey	Samantha					
9	Abbey	Samantha	Samantha	Tamar	Sophia						
10	Asha	Sarah	Amber	Lucy							
11	Sophia	Lianna	Asha								
12	Jasmia	Nina									
13	Yvette										

The contestant was eliminated
The contestant won the competition

- In episode 7, Georgina and Tamar landed in the bottom two. Both of them were eliminated.

=== Bottom two ===
Episode	Contestants	Eliminated
1	Jasmia & Yvette	Yvette
2	Lianna & Nina	Nina
3	Amber & Asha	Asha
4	Lucy & Tamar	Lucy
5	Abbey & Sophia	Sophia
6	Samantha & Sarah	Samantha
7	Georgina & Tamar	Georgina
7	Georgina & Tamar	Tamar
8	Lianna & Sarah	Sarah
9	Amber & Lianna	Amber
10	Abbey & Jasmia	Jasmia
10	Abbey & Lianna	Abigail

The contestant was eliminated after her first time in the bottom two
The contestant was eliminated after her second time in the bottom two
The contestant was eliminated in the final judging and placed as the runner-up

=== Average call-out order ===
Final two is not included.

Rank by average	Place	Model	Call-out total	Number of call-outs	Call-out average
1	1	Lianna	38	10	3.80
2	3	Jasmia	43	10	4.30
3	2	Abbey	44	10	4.40
4	6-7	Tamar	31	7	4.43
5	4	Amber	41	9	4.56
6	5	Sarah	39	8	4.88
7	6-7	Georgina	36	7	5.14
8	10	Lucy	21	4	5.25
9	9	Sophia	36	5	7.20
10	8	Samantha	44	6	7.33
11	11	Asha	25	3	8.33
12	12	Nina	18	2	9.00
13	13	Yvette	13	1	13.00

=== Photo Shoot Guide ===
- Episode 1 Photoshoot: Swimwear in the Snow
- Episode 2 Photoshoot: Lesbian Couples
- Episode 3 Photoshoot: Queens of Burlesque
- Episode 4 Photoshoot: Appletiser Soft Drink Advertisement on a Trampoline
- Episode 5 Photoshoot: Gothic Brides
- Episode 6 Photoshoot: Heavy Metallic Make-Up Beauty Shots
- Episode 7 Photoshoot: Country Life
- Episode 8 Photoshoot: Covering a Ford Fiesta with Paint
- Episode 9 Photoshoot: Moroccans in the Desert
- Episode 10 Photoshoot: Queens of Morocco

== Ratings ==
Episode Viewing figures from BARB

Episode	Date	Total Viewers	LIVINGtv Weekly Ranking
1	24 July 2006	Under 207,000	Outside Top 10
2	31 July 2006	244,000	8
3	7 August 2006	283,000	6
4	14 August 2006	199,000	9
5	21 August 2006	247,000	9
6	28 August 2006	Under 213,000	Outside Top 10
7	4 September 2006	Under 230,000	Outside Top 10
8	11 September 2006	209,000	10
9	18 September 2006	218,000	9
10	25 September 2006	288,000	6
