= Britain's Next Top Model series 1 =

Britain's Next Top Model
- Season 1
- Judges: Lisa Butcher; Marie Helvin; Jonathan Phang
- No. of contestants: 12
- Winner: Lucy Ratcliffe
- No. of episodes: 10

Release
- Original network: Living TV
- Original release: 14 September – 16 November 2005

Series chronology
- Next → Series 2

The first cycle of Britain's Next Top Model premiered on 14 September 2005 on Living TV. Model Lisa Butcher served as the show's first host, with a panel consisting of former fashion model Marie Helvin and photographer Jonathan Phang.

The prizes for this cycle included a modelling contract with Models 1, as well as an additional contract with Beatrice Models in Milan, a cover feature for B magazine, and a contract with Ruby & Millie cosmetics.

The winner of the competition was 20-year-old Lucy Ratcliffe from Newcastle upon Tyne.

== Cast ==
=== Contestants ===
(Ages stated are at start of contest)

Contestant	Age	Height	Hometown	Finish	Place
Marina Fallahi	19	1.70 m (5 ft 7 in)	Cheshire, England	Episode 1	12
Claire Hillier	20	1.78 m (5 ft 10 in)	Bridgend, Wales	Episode 2	11
Shauna Breen	23	1.78 m (5 ft 10 in)	Derry, Northern Ireland	Episode 3	10
Anne Kent	21	1.78 m (5 ft 10 in)	Sheffield, England	Episode 4	9 (quit)
Hayley Wilkins	20	1.73 m (5 ft 8 in)	West Sussex, England	Episode 5	8
Marisa Heath	24	1.75 m (5 ft 9 in)	Surrey, England	Episode 6	7
Stephanie Jones	22	1.73 m (5 ft 8 in)	Birmingham, England	Episode 7	6
Naomi Teal	22	1.70 m (5 ft 7 in)	Leeds, England	Episode 9	5
Tashi Brown	24	1.80 m (5 ft 11 in)	Leeds, England	Episode 9	4
Jenilee Harris	20	1.72 m (5 ft 7 1/2 in)	Sittingbourne, Kent, England	Episode 10	3
Edwina Joseph	18	1.77 m (5 ft 9 1/2 in)	Bristol, England	Episode 10	2
Lucy Ratcliffe	20	1.80 m (5 ft 11 in)	Newcastle upon Tyne, England	Episode 10	1

=== Judges ===
- Lisa Butcher (host)
- Marie Helvin
- Jonathan Phang

== Results ==
Order	Episode										
Order	1	2	3	4 (Note: In episode 4, Anne quit the competition before judging. Therefore, no one was eliminated that week.)	5	6	7	9 (Note: In episode 9, there were two separate eliminations.)		10	
1	Marisa	Tashi	Jenilee	Edwina	Stephanie	Tashi	Lucy	Lucy	Jenilee	Edwina	Lucy
2	Jenilee	Shauna	Anne	Tashi	Lucy	Naomi	Edwina	Jenilee	Lucy	Lucy	Edwina
3	Naomi	Lucy	Marisa	Hayley	Edwina	Lucy	Jenilee	Edwina	Edwina	Jenilee	
4	Anne	Hayley	Hayley	Jenilee	Jenilee	Edwina	Naomi	Tashi	Tashi		
5	Tashi	Marisa	Tashi	Marisa	Tashi	Stephanie	Tashi	Naomi			
6	Hayley	Stephanie	Lucy	Naomi	Marisa	Jenilee	Stephanie				
7	Lucy	Naomi	Stephanie	Lucy; Stephanie	Naomi	Marisa					
8	Stephanie	Jenilee	Naomi	Lucy; Stephanie	Hayley						
9	Edwina	Edwina	Edwina	Anne							
10	Claire	Anne	Shauna								
11	Shauna	Claire									
12	Marina										

The contestant won the competition
The contestant was eliminated
The contestant was part of a non-elimination bottom two
The contestant quit the competition

- Episode 8 was the recap episode.

=== Bottom two ===
Episode	Contestants	Eliminated
1	Marina & Shauna	Marina
2	Anne & Claire	Claire
3	Edwina & Shauna	Shauna
4	Lucy & Stephanie	Anne
5	Hayley & Naomi	Hayley
6	Jenilee & Marisa	Marisa
7	Stephanie & Tashi	Stephanie
9	Naomi & Tashi	Naomi
9	Edwina & Tashi	Tashi
10	Jenilee & Lucy	Jenilee
10	Edwina & Lucy	Edwina

The contestant was eliminated after her first time in the bottom two
The contestant was eliminated after her second time in the bottom two
The contestant was eliminated after her third time in the bottom two
The contestant quit the competition
The contestant was eliminated in the final judging and placed as the runner-up

=== Average call-out order ===
Final two is not included.

Rank by average	Place	Model	Call-out total	Number of call-outs	Call-out average
1	1	Lucy	34	10	3.40
2	3	Jenilee	35	10	3.50
3	4	Tashi	32	9	3.56
4	2	Edwina	44	10	4.40
5	7	Marisa	27	6	4.50
6	8	Hayley	25	5	5.00
7	5	Naomi	42	8	5.25
8	9	Anne	16	3	5.33
9	6	Stephanie	39	7	5.57
10	10	Shauna	23	3	7.67
11	11	Claire	21	2	10.50
12	12	Marina	12	1	12.00

== Ratings ==
Episode Viewing figures from BARB

Episode	Date	Total Viewers	LIVINGtv Weekly Ranking
1	14 September 2005	244,000	5
2	21 September 2005	236,000	5
3	28 September 2005	192,000	7
4	5 October 2005	181,000	9
5	12 October 2005	185,000	7
6	19 October 2005	181,000	10
7	26 October 2005	Under 163,000	Outside Top 10
8	2 November 2005	Under 199,000	Outside Top 10
9	9 November 2005	257,000	4
10	16 November 2005	212,000	8
