= Britain & Ireland's Next Top Model series 9 =

Britain & Ireland's Next Top Model
- Season 9
- Judges: Elle Macpherson; Tyson Beckford; Dannii Minogue
- No. of contestants: 14
- Winner: Lauren Lambert
- No. of episodes: 13

Release
- Original network: Sky Living
- Original release: 20 June – 5 September 2013

Season chronology
- ← Previous; Cycle 8 Next → Cycle 10 (on Lifetime)

The ninth cycle of Britain & Ireland's Next Top Model premiered on 20 June 2013 on Sky Living. Two judges from the previous cycle did not retain their positions. Elle Macpherson continued as the show's head judge along with model Tyson Beckford, but fashion designer Julien Macdonald and Whitney Port left the series. Australian singer and talent show judge Dannii Minogue joined the series as a third judge.

A new format was introduced at judging beginning with this cycle. Guest judges were no longer a deciding factor during eliminations. At panel, the judges went straight into deliberation without evaluating each contestant individually. Furthermore, there were multiple contestants in danger of elimination each week as opposed to the usual two in seasons past. Only the contestants in danger of elimination received in-depth critique and feedback on ways to improve their performance.

Cycle 9 auditions began in November 2012. The show saw a record number of auditions held in over 17 cities ranging from Plymouth to Glasgow. Filming for the show's ninth cycle began on 21 January 2013

The prizes for this cycle included a modelling contract with Models 1, a fashion spread and cover feature in Company magazine, contracts with Revlon cosmetics and TRESemmé, and an all-expenses paid shopping spree to New York City, courtesy of Destinology.

The winner of the competition was 23-year-old Lauren Lambert from Wallington, Surrey.

== Cast ==
=== Contestants ===
(Ages stated are at start of contest)

Contestant	Age	Height	Hometown	Finish	Place
Christina Chalk	19	1.73 m (5 ft 8 in)	Dunblane, Scotland	Episode 2	14
Danielle Sandhu	20	1.75 m (5 ft 9 in)	Retford, England	Episode 3	13
Jessica 'Jess' Patterson	20	1.75 m (5 ft 9 in)	Knocklyon, Republic of Ireland	Episode 4	12
Abigail Johns	19	1.78 m (5 ft 10 in)	London, England	Episode 5	11
Laura Young	19	1.77 m (5 ft 9 1/2 in)	Malvern, England	Episode 6	10
Emily Garner	18	1.73 m (5 ft 8 in)	Chelmsford, England	Episode 7	9
Saffron Williams	19	1.75 m (5 ft 9 in)	Batley, England	Episode 8	8
Holly Carpenter	21	1.77 m (5 ft 9 1/2 in)	Raheny, Republic of Ireland	Episode 9	7
Angel Mbonu	18	1.77 m (5 ft 9 1/2 in)	Middlesex, England	Episode 10	6
Naomi Pelkiewicz	22	1.80 m (5 ft 11 in)	Bristol, England	Episode 11	5
Sophie Ellson	19	1.82 m (5 ft 11 1/2 in)	Bournemouth, England	Episode 12	4
Sarah Kennedy	22	1.74 m (5 ft 8 1/2 in)	Portnoo, Republic of Ireland	Episode 13	3-2
Emma Ward	20	1.78 m (5 ft 10 in)	Leeds, England	Episode 13	3-2
Lauren Lambert	23	1.88 m (6 ft 2 in)	Wallington, England	Episode 13	1

=== Judges ===
- Elle Macpherson (host)
- Tyson Beckford
- Dannii Minogue

== Episodes ==
No. overall	No. in season	Title	Original release date	UK viewers (millions)
96	1	"Episode 1"	20 June 2013	0.30 (309,000) (Note: Episode viewing figures from BARB)
The 28 semi-finalists converged in London for casting week, where they met the judges for the first time and had one-on-one interviews with them before facing a cut that saw seven hopefuls leave the competition. The remaining 20 semi-finalists had a natural beauty photo shoot in groups of four. At the end of the episode, the judges chose the final 14 contestants, and the finalists moved into the model home.: Featured photographer: Alex James
97	2	"Episode 2"	20 June 2013	0.34 (348,000)
The contestants arrived at the National Exhibition Centre in Birmingham, and were put through their paces on the catwalk by model Jade Parfitt and designer Ian Stuart before being cast in a bridal runway show later that evening. Angel and Naomi were chosen as the best performers, and found an array of gifts waiting for them back at the house. The models also had a mock cover photo shoot for Company magazine, where they met the magazine's editor Victoria White. At elimination Emma received picture of the week, while Christina, Danielle, Saffron, and Sarah were singled out as the week's worst performing contestants. Christina and Danielle landed in the bottom two, and Christina was eliminated from the competition.: Special guests: Jade Parfitt, Ian Stuart, Victoria White; Featured photographer: Tim James
98	3	"Episode 3"	27 June 2013	0.43 (430,000)
The contestants were taken to the Matthew Curtis salon for makeovers, where Abigail and Saffron refused to cut their hair. They were later taken to a manor house in the countryside, and had a photo shoot on a pommel horse with gymnast Louis Smith. After being treated for a special meal at one of London's top restaurants, the models prepared for their next elimination. At elimination Lauren received picture of the week, while Abigail, Danielle, Laura, and Saffron were singled out as the week's worst performing contestants. Abigail and Danielle landed in the bottom two, and Danielle was eliminated from the competition.: Special guests: Matthew Curtis, Louis Smith; Featured photographer: Dan Kennedy
99	4	"Episode 4"	4 July 2013	0.36 (367,000)
The remaining contestants were taken to the offices of Models 1, and were divided into two groups of six for a go-see challenge with designers Ben de Lisi and Daniel Lismore. Angel and Sarah were chosen as the best performers. As the winners of the challenge, they were allowed to bring Abigail and Emma with them for a night out. The models were later taken to the beach, where they met model Jourdan Dunn, and found out that they would be posing topless in a denim photo shoot with a male model. At elimination Naomi received picture of the week, while Abigail, Holly, Jess, and Sophie were singled out as the week's worst performing contestants. Abigail and Jess landed in the bottom two, and Jess was eliminated from the competition.: Special guests: Daniel Lismore, Ben de Lisi, Jourdan Dunn; Featured photographer: Joseph Sinclair
100	5	"Episode 5"	11 July 2013	0.43 (432,000)
The remaining 11 contestants took on a photo shoot challenge with host Elle Macpherson and photographer Nicky Johnston geared towards helping them home in on their posing skills. Sarah was chosen as the best performer, winning a night out with three friends of her choosing. On set, the models had to pose underwater wearing colorful gowns in a photo shoot for Top Tea. At elimination Sarah received picture of the week, while Abigail, Angel, Emma, and Laura were singled out as the week's worst performing contestants. Abigail and Laura landed in the bottom two, and Abigail was eliminated from the competition.: Special guests: Lauren Maddox; Featured photographer: Nicky Johnston, Zena Holloway
101	6	"Episode 6"	18 July 2013	0.39 (393,000)
The contestants met designer former judge and designer Louis Mariette for a runway challenge in which they had to model a variety of different accessories. As the winner of the challenge, Lauren was treated to a night out with two friends of her choosing. On set, the models had to pose nude for a black and white photo shoot with photographer Catherine Harbour. Lauren received picture of the week, while Emily, Laura, Naomi, and Saffron were singled out as the week's worst performing contestants. Emily and Laura landed in the bottom two, and Laura was eliminated from the competition.: Special guests: Louis Mariette; Featured photographer: Catherine Harbour
102	7	"Episode 7"	25 July 2013	0.47 (471,000)
The remaining models were taken to a farm to shoot a commercial campaign for Make Mine Milk with a cow. As the best performer and winner of the challenge, Sophie received £1,000 worth of Danilo Gabrielli vouchers. The following day the contestants had a photo shoot in which they had to portray different fairy tale characters, and were berated by judge Elle Macpherson following the shoot due to their lack of professionalism on set. At elimination Lauren received picture of the week, while Angel, Emily, Holly, and Naomi were singled out as the week's worst performing contestants. Emily and Naomi landed in the bottom two, and Emily was eliminated from the competition.: Special guests: Paul de Frades; Featured photographer: Uli Webber
103	8	"Episode 8"	1 August 2013	0.39 (395,000)
The contestants celebrated Sarah's 23rd birthday, and later had a Jeopardy!-style fashion quiz in pairs with OBE journalist and fashion director, Hilary Alexander. As the winners of the challenge, Naomi and Sophie were treated to a tour bus party for four with former contestants of the show, which they chose to share with Emma and Holly. The following day the models were taken to an antique library for a Hollywood glamour photo shoot in which they had to pose with snakes. Angel received picture of the week at elimination, while Holly, Saffron, and Sarah were singled out as the week's worst performing contestants. Holly and Saffron landed in the bottom two, and Saffron was eliminated from the competition.: Special guests: Hilary Alexander, Anita Kaushik, Annaliese Dayes, Catherine Thomas, Charlotte Holmes, Imogen Leaver, Jade Thompson, Letitia Herod, Chris Brown, Mark Amey; Featured photographer: Alex James
104	9	"Episode 9"	8 August 2013	0.40 (408,000)
Special guests: Natalie Legg, Iggy Azalea; Featured photographer: Seb Winter
105	10	"Episode 10"	15 August 2013	0.30 (306,000)
Special guests: Joanna Roterberg, Annabel Granger; Featured photographer: Joseph Montezinos
106	11	"Episode 11"	22 August 2013	0.31 (317,000)
Special guests: Amanda Reifer, T-Ray Armstrong, Barry 'Bar-Man' Hill, Jamar Harding, Victoria Barker; Featured photographer: Joseph Montezinos
107	12	"Episode 12"	29 August 2013	0.36 (366,000)
Special guests: Kingsley Throne, Kesia Estwick; Featured photographer: Joseph Montezinos
108	13	"Episode 13"	5 September 2013	0.33 (334,000)
The finalists were taken to a luxury residence, where they had a poolside swimwear photo shoot for St. Tropez spray tan under the judges' watchful eyes. They later had a final runway show featuring carnival themed designs by Asheley Martin. At the end of the night the judges deliberated over each finalists' work and progress throughout the competition, and Lauren was crowned as the winner.: Special guests: Asheley Martin, Rodney Powers; Featured photographer: Joseph Montezinos

== Results ==
Order	Episode												
Order	1 (Note: In episode 1, the pool of 27 semi-finalists was reduced to the final 14 contestants who moved on to the main competition. The first official elimination took place in episode 2.)	2	3	4	5	6	7	8	9	10	11	12	13
1	Angel	Emma	Lauren	Naomi	Sarah	Lauren	Lauren	Angel	Lauren	Sarah	Emma	Emma	Lauren
2	Emma	Naomi	Sophie	Laura	Sophie	Sophie	Sophie	Emma	Sophie	Naomi	Sarah	Sarah	Emma; Sarah
3	Laura	Lauren	Sarah	Emma	Naomi	Sarah	Sarah	Sophie	Emma	Lauren	Lauren	Lauren	Emma; Sarah
4	Jess	Sophie	Holly	Lauren	Holly	Holly	Emma	Naomi	Angel	Sophie	Sophie	Sophie	
5	Lauren	Angel	Angel	Angel	Lauren	Angel	Saffron	Lauren	Naomi	Emma	Naomi		
6	Saffron	Holly	Emily	Sarah	Emily	Emma	Holly	Sarah	Sarah	Angel			
7	Christina	Emily	Emma	Emily	Saffron	Naomi	Angel	Holly	Holly				
8	Emily	Jess	Naomi	Saffron	Angel	Saffron	Naomi	Saffron					
9	Holly	Abigail	Jess	Sophie	Emma	Emily	Emily						
10	Sarah	Laura	Laura	Holly	Laura	Laura							
11	Sophie	Sarah	Saffron	Abigail	Abigail								
12	Abigail	Saffron	Abigail	Jess									
13	Danielle	Danielle	Danielle										
14	Naomi	Christina											

The contestant was eliminated
The contestant won the competition

=== Bottom two ===
Episode	Contestants	Eliminated
2	Christina & Danielle	Christina
3	Abigail & Danielle	Danielle
4	Abigail & Jess	Jess
5	Abigail & Laura	Abigail
6	Emily & Laura	Laura
7	Emily & Naomi	Emily
8	Holly & Saffron	Saffron
9	Holly & Sarah	Holly
10	Angel & Emma	Angel
11	Naomi & Sophie	Naomi
12	Lauren & Sophie	Sophie
13	Emma, Lauren & Sarah	Emma
13	Emma, Lauren & Sarah	Sarah

The contestant was eliminated after her first time in the bottom two
The contestant was eliminated after her second time in the bottom two
The contestant was eliminated after her third time in the bottom two
The contestant was eliminated in the final judging and placed as the runner-up

=== Average call-out order ===
Final two is not included.

Rank by average	Place	Model	Call-out total	Number of call-outs	Call-out average
1	1	Lauren	31	11	2.82
2	4	Sophie	38	11	3.45
3	2-3	Emma	42	11	3.82
3	2-3	Sarah	44	11	4.00
5	5	Naomi	46	10	4.60
6	6	Angel	46	9	5.11
7	7	Holly	48	8	6.00
8	9	Emily	44	6	7.33
9	10	Laura	42	5	8.40
10	8	Saffron	59	7	8.43
11	12	Jess	29	3	9.67
12	11	Abigail	43	4	10,75
13	13	Danielle	26	2	13.00
14	14	Christina	14	1	14.00
