= Brendan Cole =

New Zealand dancer (born 1976)

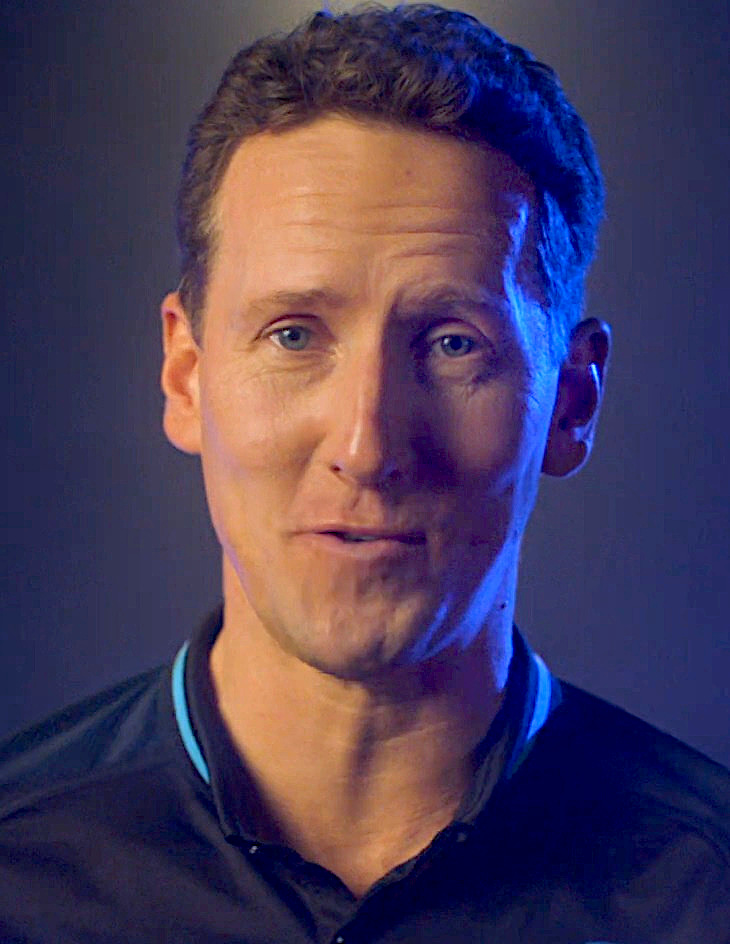
- Cole in 2018
- Born: 23 April 1976 (age 50); Christchurch, New Zealand
- Occupation: Dancer
- Years active: 1993–present
- Spouse: Zoe Hobbs (m. 2010)
- Partner: Camilla Dallerup (1996–2004)
- Children: 2
- Dancing career
- Dances: Latin American

Brendan Cole (born 23 April 1976) is a New Zealand ballroom dancer, specialising in Latin American dancing. He is most famous for appearing as a professional dancer on the BBC One show, Strictly Come Dancing from 2004 to 2017. From 2005 to 2009, he was a judge on the New Zealand version of the show, Dancing with the Stars.

== Early life and career ==
Cole was born in 1976, in Christchurch, New Zealand. He learned to dance at the age of six, along his brother and sister. As a child, he won the Juvenile, Junior and Youth Champion of New Zealand. He moved to the United Kingdom when he was eighteen, where he studied the pasodoble, ballroom and ballet at Donaheys, Clayton, Manchester. Before becoming a professional dancer Cole was a builder and roof layer, having left school at 17.

He danced with Camilla Dallerup, a fellow contestant on the BBC's earlier long-running show Come Dancing, as amateurs from 1996 to 1999, and professional from 2002 to 2004. Despite Dallerup being Danish-born, they competed in Latin for New Zealand, for seven years. In 2002, they won the Professional Latin New Zealand National Championships in Auckland. In 2003, they won the Professional Latin Universal Open in Frimley Green, England. and the BATD English Championships in Watford. The same year they won the New Zealand Closed National Championships in Wellington, and won the Taiwan International in Taipei.

In the winter of 2004, Cole had his first acting experience in a feature film: Everything to Dance for alongside Sasha Jackson, Travis Oliver and Sally Reeve.

In 2009, Cole appeared on the New Zealand travel show Intrepid Journeys, however, during a hunting lesson filmed in Vanuatu, he was shown killing and eating a chicken, prompting international news coverage.

In October 2019, he competed in The X Factor: Celebrity alongside Jeremy Edwards.

== Personal life ==
In 2010, Cole married Zoe Hobbs, a British model, who gave birth to their first child, daughter Aurelia, on Christmas Day 2012. In March 2018, Zoe gave birth to their son Danté. The family live in Aylesbury, Buckinghamshire (2015).

== Televised competitions ==
In summer 2006, he joined ITV's Love Island and became the runner-up when the show ended on 28 August 2006. Also in that year, he appeared as a guest judge on the fourth episode of Britain's Next Top Model, where he worked with the remaining 10 contestants to teach ballroom dancing prior to judging.

In January 2007, Cole appeared on the BBC's duet show Just the Two of Us as a celebrity, with Beverley Knight as his professional partner. They came second.

Cole represented the United Kingdom at the first Eurovision Dance Contest in September 2007. His dance partner was Camilla Dallerup. The couple were highly praised by British judges yet only managed to finish fifteenth out of the sixteen entrants.

In 2010, he was a celebrity guest team captain on What Do Kids Know? along with Rufus Hound, Joe Swash and Sara Cox on Watch.

In 2019, he participated in Pilgrimage: Road to Rome, as self-described atheist.

In 2022, he appeared as a contestant on the fourteenth series of Dancing on Ice and was partnered with Vanessa Bauer. Cole reached the final and placed second.

=== Dancing with the Stars (NZ) ===
Cole has judged New Zealand's version of Strictly Come Dancing, Dancing with the Stars, 2005–2009. In the years when Craig Revel Horwood was one of the other judges the two men's opinions and scores were frequently markedly different.

=== Strictly Come Dancing ===
Highest and lowest scoring performances per dance

Dance	Partner	Highest	Partner	Lowest
American Smooth	Sophie Ellis-Bextor	36	Kirsty Gallacher	23
Argentine Tango	Lisa Snowdon	35	Sophie Ellis-Bextor	32
Cha-Cha-Cha	Lisa Snowdon	40	Charlotte Hawkins	12
Charleston	Sophie Ellis-Bextor	36	Kirsty Gallacher	17
Foxtrot	Lisa Snowdon	40	Fiona Phillips; Jo Wood	20
Jive	Kelly Brook	36	Fiona Phillips	16
Paso Doble	Natasha Kaplinsky; Sophie Ellis-Bextor	35	Jo Wood	20
Quickstep	Lisa Snowdon	40	Anastacia; Victoria Pendleton	30
Rumba	Natasha Kaplinsky	36	Fiona Phillips	13
Salsa	Sunetra Sarker	27	Kirsty Gallacher	20
Samba	Natasha Kaplinsky	37	Jo Wood	14
Showdance	Natasha Kaplinsky; Sophie Ellis-Bextor	35	-	-
Tango	Kelly Brook; Lisa Snowdon	35	Charlotte Hawkins	17
Viennese Waltz	Sophie Ellis-Bextor	39	Jo Wood	23
Waltz	Lisa Snowdon	39	Fiona Phillips	11

Series	Celebrity partner	Place	Average Score
1	Natasha Kaplinsky	1st	33.0
2	Sarah Manners	6th	26.8
3	Fiona Phillips	9th	15.0
4	Claire King	6th	24.9
5	Kelly Brook	6th	33.0
6	Lisa Snowdon	3rd	34.8
7	Jo Wood	11th	18.8
8	Michelle Williams	9th	26.4
9	Lulu	10th	24.5
10	Victoria Pendleton	8th	24.1
11	Sophie Ellis-Bextor	4th	33.3
12	Sunetra Sarker	7th	28.4
13	Kirsty Gallacher	11th	21.7
14	Anastacia	10th	26.5
15	Charlotte Hawkins	13th	17.5

Cole appeared in the first 15 series BBC One's Strictly Come Dancing, until announcing in January 2018 that his contract had not been renewed.

In the 2004 debut series of Strictly Come Dancing, Cole's celebrity partner was BBC newsreader and presenter Natasha Kaplinsky. They went on to win the show.

In the second series, he was partnered with Casualty actress Sarah Manners. However, they became the fifth couple to leave the competition. During the 2004 Christmas Special Cole again partnered Kaplinsky and they came in second place, dancing a Foxtrot.

In Series 3 Cole was then paired with GMTV presenter and newsreader Fiona Phillips. They were eliminated during the fourth week, coming ninth. Cole then appeared in the 2005 Christmas Special with Rachel Hunter, dancing a Rumba.

He returned to compete on the fourth series, where he partnered with actress Claire King. They were the ninth couple to be eliminated.

In the fifth series, Cole partnered Kelly Brook. They withdrew in week 9 due to the death of Brook's father.

For the sixth series, Cole's dance partner was presenter Lisa Snowdon. They reached the finals but were eliminated in third place. Cole and Snowdon danced again in the 2008 Christmas special, performing a quickstep.

In Series 7 Cole's partner was businesswoman and media personality Jo Wood. They were eliminated in week 6.

In the eighth series, Cole's partner was American singer Michelle Williams; they were eliminated in the seventh week of competition.

For the ninth series, Cole was paired with singer Lulu. They were eliminated on the sixth week. Cole also stepped in to partner Holly Valance and Anita Dobson during weeks 7 and 9 respectively due to their original partners being injured.

For the tenth series, Cole was partnered with Olympic track cyclist, Victoria Pendleton. They were eliminated in the eighth week of competition.

In series 11, Cole partnered singer-songwriter Sophie Ellis-Bextor, reaching the final and being eliminated in fourth place.

For the twelfth series, his dance partner was Casualty actress Sunetra Sarker. They were the ninth couple to be eliminated.

Cole competed with television presenter Kirsty Gallacher in the show's thirteenth series and was eliminated in week 6. Following his elimination with Gallacher, Cole entered the Children in Need special which he won with actress Laura Main. Cole also took part in the 2015 Christmas Special, where he and series 11 winner Abbey Clancy danced a waltz.

For the show's fourteenth series, Cole was partnered with American singer Anastacia. They were placed in the bottom two in week 2, but an injury sustained by Anastacia meant they were unable to take part in the dance-off and the decision was referred to the public vote. Anastacia and Cole polled more votes than Melvin Odoom and Janette Manrara, and were allowed to stay in the competition. They were eventually eliminated in week 6.

In 2017 Cole returned for the fifteenth series, paired with Good Morning Britain presenter Charlotte Hawkins. They were eliminated in week 4. He took part in that year's Christmas Special, partnering Katie Derham: the couple won the event.

=== Strictly Come Dancing performances ===
Series 1 – with celebrity dance partner Natasha Kaplinsky Series average: 33.0

Week #	Dance / Song	Judges' scores				Total	Result
Week #	Dance / Song	Horwood	Philips	Goodman	Tonioli	Total	Result
1	Cha-Cha-Cha / "Chain of Fools"	5	7	8	7	27	No elimination
2	Quickstep / "The Lady Is a Tramp"	7	8	8	8	31	Safe
3	Jive / "Jump, Jive an' Wail"	7	7	5	7	26	Bottom two
4	Foxtrot / "The Girl from Ipanema"	8	9	9	9	35	Safe
5	Samba / "Love Is in the Air"	9	10	9	9	37	Safe
6	Tango / "Libertango"; Rumba / "Endless Love"	8; 9	7; 9	8; 9	8; 9	31; 36	Safe
7	Waltz / "With You I'm Born Again"; Paso Doble / "O Fortuna"	9; 8	9; 9	9; 9	9; 9	36; 35	Safe
8	Quickstep / "The Lady Is a Tramp"; Samba / "Love Is in the Air"; Showdance / "(I've Had) The Time of My Life"	9; 7; 8	9; 7; 9	9; 9; 9	9; 8; 9	36; 31; 35	Series winners

Series 2 – with celebrity dance partner Sarah Manners Series average: 26.8

Week #	Dance / Song	Judges' scores				Total	Result
Week #	Dance / Song	Horwood	Philips	Goodman	Tonioli	Total	Result
1	Waltz / "I Wonder Why"	6	7	7	8	28	Safe
2	Rumba / "I Don't Want to Miss a Thing"	5	6	6	6	23	Safe
3	Tango / "Hernando's Hideaway"	7	8	8	8	31	Safe
4	Paso Doble / "Bring Me to Life"	8	7	6	8	29	Bottom two
5	Samba / "Kiss Kiss"	5	6	6	6	23	Eliminated

Series 3 – with celebrity dance partner Fiona Phillips Series average: 15.0

Week #	Dance / Song	Judges' scores				Total	Result
Week #	Dance / Song	Horwood	Philips	Goodman	Tonioli	Total	Result
1	Waltz / "Sam"	2	2	4	3	11	Safe
2	Rumba / "Almost Here"	1	2	6	4	13	Safe
3	Jive / "Hit the Road Jack"	2	4	5	5	16	Safe
4	Foxtrot / "Ain't That a Kick in the Head?"	3	5	6	6	20	Eliminated

Series 4 with celebrity dance partner Claire King Series average: 24.9

Week #	Dance / Song	Judges' scores				Total	Result
Week #	Dance / Song	Horwood	Philips	Goodman	Tonioli	Total	Result
2	Rumba / "Show Me Heaven"	7	4	4	6	21	Safe
3	Jive / "Nutbush City Limits"	4	6	6	6	22	Safe
4	Foxtrot / "Sweet Caroline"	7	4	6	7	24	Safe
5	Salsa / "Señorita"	4	5	6	6	21	Safe
6	American Smooth / "Blue Moon"	8	7	9	8	32	Safe
7	Tango / "Ole Guapa"	8	8	6	7	29	Safe
8	Samba / "I Love to Love"	5	5	8	7	25	Eliminated

Series 5 – with celebrity dance partner Kelly Brook Series average: 33.0

Week #	Dance / Song	Judges' scores				Total	Result
Week #	Dance / Song	Horwood	Philips	Goodman	Tonioli	Total	Result
2	Rumba / "She's Like the Wind"	8	9	8	8	33	Safe
3	Tango / "Gimme! Gimme! Gimme! (A Man After Midnight)"	9	9	8	9	35	Safe
4	American Smooth / "(Love Is) The Tender Trap"	8	8	8	10	34	Safe
5	Paso Doble / "You Give Love a Bad Name"	7	7	7	7	28	Safe
6	Viennese Waltz / "Delilah"	9	9	9	9	36	Safe
7	Jive / "Johnny B. Goode"	9	9	9	9	36	Safe
8	Samba / "Stayin' Alive"	7	7	7	8	29	Bottom two
9^{1}	–	–	–	–	–	–	Withdrew
^{1} Due to her father's death from cancer, Brook officially withdrew from the competition, leaving the couple in sixth place.

Series 6 – with celebrity dance partner Lisa Snowdon Series average: 34.8

Week #	Dance / Song	Judges' scores				Total	Result
Week #	Dance / Song	Horwood	Philips	Goodman	Tonioli	Total	Result
2	Salsa / "Rhythm Is Gonna Get You"	5	5	6	6	22	Safe
4	Rumba / "Suddenly"	8	8	8	8	32	Safe
5	American Smooth / "It Happened in Monterey"	8	9	9	9	35	Safe
6	Paso Doble / "Eye of the Tiger"	7	7	7	7	28	Safe
7	Tango / "La Cumparsita"	8	9	9	9	35	Safe
8	Viennese Waltz / "Bed of Roses"	9	9	9	9	36	Safe
9	Samba / "Rock the Boat"	6	7	9	8	30	Bottom two
10	Quickstep / "Yes"	8	9	9	9	35	Bottom two
11	Foxtrot / "Walkin' My Baby Back Home"; Cha-Cha-Cha / "Tears Dry on Their Own"	9; 9	10; 9	10; 10	10; 10	39; 38	Safe
12	Waltz / "He Was Beautiful"; Jive / "Crocodile Rock"	9; 8	10; 8	10; 8	10; 9	39; 33	Bottom two
13	Argentine Tango / "Infiltrado"; Quickstep / "Dancing in the Dark"	8; 10	8; 10	10; 10	9; 10	35; 40	Safe
14	Foxtrot / "Walkin' My Baby Back Home"; Cha-Cha-Cha / "Tears Dry on Their Own"	10; 10	10; 10	10; 10	10; 10	40; 40	Third place

Series 7 – with celebrity dance partner: Jo Wood Series average: 18.8

Week #	Dance / Song	Judges' scores				Total	Result
Week #	Dance / Song	Horwood	Goodman	Dixon	Tonioli	Total	Result
2	Tango / "Let's Dance"	3	5	5	5	18	Safe
2	Rumba / "Fallen"	3	5	5	5	18	Safe
3	Paso Doble / "Because the Night"	3	6	6	5	20	Safe
4	Foxtrot / "Crazy"	4	6	6	5	20	Safe
5	Viennese Waltz / "Trouble"	5	7	6	5	23	Safe
6	Samba / "Superstition"	2	5	3	4	14	Eliminated

Series 8 – with celebrity dance partner Michelle Williams Series average: 26.3

Week #	Dance / Song	Judges' scores				Total	Result
Week #	Dance / Song	Horwood	Goodman	Dixon	Tonioli	Total	Result
1	Cha-Cha-Cha / "Stone Cold Sober"	5	6	7	6	24	No elimination
2	Foxtrot / "It Had to Be You"	6	7	7	6	26	Safe
3	Rumba / "Wicked Game"	4	6	7	7	24	Bottom two
4^{1}	Tango / "Killer"	6	7	7	7	27	Bottom two
5	Jive / "The Time Warp"	7	6	8	8	29	Safe
6	Waltz / "Right Here Waiting"	6	8	8	8	30	Bottom two
7	Paso Doble / "American Woman"	5	6	7	6	24	Eliminated
^{1} Professional dancer Ian Waite stood in Cole's position this week, whilst he was away attending his father's funeral.

Series 9 – with celebrity dance partner Lulu Series average: 24.8

Week #	Dance / Song	Judges' scores				Total	Result
Week #	Dance / Song	Horwood	Goodman	Dixon	Tonioli	Total	Result
1	Cha-Cha-Cha / "I've Got The Music In Me"	2	5	5	5	17	No elimination
2	Foxtrot / "Breakeven"	5	6	7	7	25	Safe
3	Rumba / "All I Ask of You"	5	7	7	7	26	Safe
4	Samba / "Sir Duke"	5	6	7	7	24	Safe
5	Paso Doble / "Highway to Hell"	6	7	8	8	29	Safe
6	Tango / "Kiss"	5	8^{1}	7	7	27	Eliminated
^{1} Score from guest judge Jennifer Grey.

Series 10 – with celebrity dance partner Victoria Pendleton Series average: 24.1

Week #	Dance / Song	Judges' scores				Total	Result
Week #	Dance / Song	Horwood	Bussell	Goodman	Tonioli	Total	Result
1	Cha-Cha-Cha / "Spinning Around"	3	4	5	4	16	No elimination
2	Foxtrot / "Moondance"	6	6	7	7	26	Safe
3	Rumba / "Up Where We Belong"	4	5	7	6	22	Safe
4	Tango / "White Wedding"	7	8	8	8	31	Safe
5	Samba / "It's Not Unusual"	6	6	6	5	23	Safe
6	Quickstep / "Luck Be a Lady"	7	7	8	8	30	Safe
7	Paso Doble / "Bicycle Race"	5	6	7	6	24	Safe
8	Salsa / "Candy"	4	6	6	5	21	Eliminated

Series 11 – with celebrity dance partner Sophie Ellis-Bextor Series average: 33.3

Week #	Dance / Song	Judges' scores				Total	Result
Week #	Dance / Song	Horwood	Bussell	Goodman	Tonioli	Total	Result
1	Waltz / "Moon River"	7	7	7	7	28	No elimination
2	Charleston / "Rock It For Me"	9	9	9	9	36	Safe
3	Samba / "All Night Long (All Night)"	7	8	8	8	31	Safe
4	Foxtrot / "Cheek to Cheek"	8	9	9	9	35	Safe
5	Cha-Cha-Cha / "P.Y.T. (Pretty Young Thing)"	7	8	7	8	30	Safe
6	Jive / "Maneater"	6	7	8	7	28	Safe
7	Argentine Tango / "Sweet Dreams (Are Made of This)"	8	8	8	8	32	Safe
8	Quickstep / "The Lady Is a Tramp"	7	9	9	9	34	Safe
9	Rumba / "Will You Still Love Me Tomorrow"	7	8	8	8	31	Safe
10	Viennese Waltz / "My Favorite Things"	9	9	9	9	36	Safe
11	Tango / "Material Girl"; Swing-a-Thon / "Do You Love Me"	9 Awarded	8; 4	8 bonus	9 points	34; 38	Safe
12	Paso Doble / "Montagues and Capulets"; American Smooth / "They Can't Take That Away From Me"	8; 8	9; 9	9; 9	9; 10	35; 36	Safe
13	Viennese Waltz / "My Favorite Things"; Showdance / "I Wanna Dance With Somebody (Who Loves Me)"	9; 8	10; 9	10; 9	10; 9	39; 35	Eliminated

Series 12 – with celebrity dance partner Sunetra Sarker Series average: 28.4

Week #	Dance / Song	Judges' scores				Total	Result
Week #	Dance / Song	Horwood	Bussell	Goodman	Tonioli	Total	Result
1	Tango / "Bad Case of Loving You (Doctor, Doctor)"	5	6	6	7	24	No elimination
2	Cha-Cha-Cha / "Million Dollar Bill"	6	6	7	7	26	Safe
3	American Smooth / "The Way You Look Tonight"	7	8, 8^{1}	9	8	40	Safe
4	Salsa / "Turn The Beat Around"	6	7	7	7	27	Safe
5	Viennese Waltz / "Anyone Who Had a Heart"	7	7	8	8	30	Safe
6	Jive / "Tainted Love"	6	7	7	7	27	Safe
7	Foxtrot / "All of Me"	7	8	8	8	31	Safe
8	Samba / "I Don't Feel Like Dancin'"	6	8	8	8	30	Bottom 2
9	Waltz / "Last Request"	7	7	8	8	30	Bottom 2
10	Rumba / "The Girl from Ipanema"	5	7	8	7	27	Eliminated
^{1} Score from guest judge Donny Osmond.

Series 13 – with celebrity dance partner Kirsty Gallacher Series Average 21.7

Week #	Dance / Song	Judges' scores				Total	Result
Week #	Dance / Song	Horwood	Bussell	Goodman	Tonioli	Total	Result
1	Waltz / "Vincent"	4	5	6	5	20	No elimination
2	Salsa / "Can't Touch It"	5	5	5	5	20	Safe
3	American Smooth / "He's a Tramp"	5	6	6	6	23	Safe
4	Pasodoble / "Beautiful Day"	4	6	6	5	21	Bottom 2
5	Viennese Waltz / "This Year's Love"	7	7	8	7	29	Safe
6	Charleston / "Bad Romance"	3	5	5	4	17	Eliminated

Series 14 – with celebrity dance partner Anastacia Series Average 26.5

Due to Cole being too ill to dance on Week 5, Anastacia danced with Gorka Márquez.

Week #	Dance / Song	Judges' scores				Total	Result
Week #	Dance / Song	Horwood	Bussell	Goodman	Tonioli	Total	Result
1	Cha-Cha-Cha / "Lady Marmalade"	8	7	7	6	28	None
2	Salsa / "Sax"	4	6	6	6	22	Bottom two
3	Viennese Waltz / "A Thousand Years"	6	7	7	7	27	Safe
4	Rumba / "The Way We Were"	6	7	7	7	27	Bottom two
5	Quickstep / "My Kind of Town"; Danced with Gorka Márquez	7	7	8	8	30	Safe
6	Jive / "Bat Out of Hell"	4	7	7	7	25	Eliminated

Series 15 – with celebrity dance partner Charlotte Hawkins Series average: 17.5

Week #	Dance / Song	Judges' scores				Total	Result
Week #	Dance / Song	Horwood	Bussell	Ballas	Tonioli	Total	Result
1	Foxtrot / "The Best Is Yet to Come"	5	5	6	6	22	No Elimination
2	Cha-Cha-Cha / "Sugar"	2	4	3	3	12	Safe
3	Tango / "Danger Zone"	4	5	4	4	17	Safe
4	Jive / "Marry You"	4	5	5	5	19	Eliminated

== Charity work ==
Cole has supported several charity functions including children's anti-bullying campaigning group Act Against Bullying.
