= Motor Neurone Disease Association =

UK charity

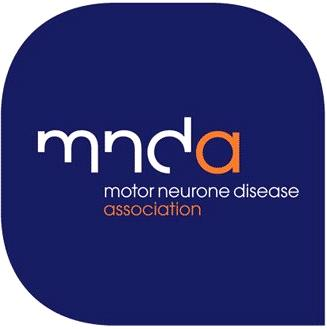
- Founded: 6 October 1979
- Type: Charitable organisation
- Registration no.: 294354
- Purpose: Motor neurone disease
- Headquarters: Francis Crick House, 6 Summerhouse Rd, Moulton Park, Northampton NN3 6BF
- Coordinates: 52.27685°N 0.87298°W
- Region served: England, Wales and Northern Ireland
- Members: 12,231 (2023)
- Royal patron: Anne, Princess Royal
- Chair of trustees: Dr Usman Khan
- Chief executive: Tanya Curry
- R.O.R. Id: https://ror.org/02gq0fg61
- Revenue: £37.9m (2023)
- Staff: 215 (2023)
- Volunteers: 13,000 (2023)
- Website: mndassociation.org

The Motor Neurone Disease Association (MND Association) focuses on improving access to care, research and campaigning for those people living with or affected by motor neurone disease (MND) in England, Wales and Northern Ireland. MND is also known as amyotrophic lateral sclerosis (ALS) or, in the United States, Lou Gehrig's disease.

The Association is the only national charity in England, Wales and Northern Ireland that funds and promotes global research into the disease and provides support for people affected by MND.

== Activities ==
=== Research ===
The MND Association funds and promotes research to understand what causes MND, how to diagnose it and, most importantly, how to effectively treat it so that it no longer devastates lives. It does this by:

- Funding research
- Coordinating research through conferences and symposia

The Association organises the International Symposium on ALS/MND, an annual event which brings together leading international researchers and health and social care professionals to present and debate innovations in their fields.

The Association funds research that includes animal testing.

=== Care and information ===
- Provide information to patients and carers
- Provide care through a network of branches and regional care advisers

=== Fundraising ===
- Fundraising and income generating activities
- The Association has 87 volunteer branches and groups across England, Wales and Northern Ireland, that assist with regional fundraising activities
- The Association benefits from legacies and also tribute funds, which are left in the memory of people affected by the disease.

=== Awareness and campaigns ===
The Association has a campaigns network that helps shape a better future for people with neurological conditions such as MND. It does this by:

- Lobbying government
- Raising awareness of the condition and encouraging adoption of best practice such as the MND Charter and NICE guidelines for MND.
- Undertaking awareness activities across the year using media and PR opportunities.
- Sharing information, informal advice and expertise via their podcast, MND Matters (launched in March 2021).

== Patrons and ambassadors ==
Current patrons and ambassadors for the organisation include:

- Gina Bellman, actor
- Chris Broad, former English cricketer
- Daniel Brocklebank, actor
- Benedict Cumberbatch, actor
- Baroness Finlay of Llandaff, palliative medicine consultant and parliamentarian
- Taron Egerton, actor
- Charlotte Hawkins, television presenter
- Lily James, actor
- Jonathan Phang, cook and television presenter
- Eddie Redmayne, actor, who played Professor Stephen Hawking (who lived with MND) in the film The Theory of Everything
- Kevin Sinfield, former England rugby league international, and friend and former Leeds Rhinos teammate of Rob Burrow who died from complications of MND in 2024.
- Jeremy Vine, television and radio presenter

=== Past patrons ===
- Sir Colin Blakemore, neurobiologist
- Rob Burrow, former England rugby league international, who died from complications of MND in 2024.
- Professor Stephen Hawking, cosmologist and theoretical physicist (who had lived with MND for many years)
