= Sean Clancy (footballer) =

English footballer (born 1987)

Personal information
- Full name: Sean Thomas Clancy
- Date of birth: 16 September 1987 (age 39)
- Place of birth: Liverpool, England
- Height: 5 ft 8 in (1.73 m)
- Positions: Left back; left midfielder

Senior career*
Years	Team	Apps	(Gls)
2004–2006	Blackpool	2	(0)
2006–2007	Southport	11	(0)
2007	Altrincham	4	(0)
2007–2009	Burscough	57	(1)
2009–2012	Fleetwood Town	87	(24)
2012	→ FC Halifax Town (loan)	11	(3)
2012	Chester	10	(1)
2012–2013	Kidderminster Harriers	3	(0)
2013	Southport	11	(1)
2013–2016	AFC Telford United	129	(18)
2016–2017	Droylsden		

International career^{‡}
2011	England C	1	(0)
- * Club domestic league appearances and goals as of 18:58, 24 October 2015 (UTC) ‡ National team caps and goals as of 00:40, 31 August 2011 (UTC)

Sean Thomas Clancy (born 16 September 1987) is an English footballer who plays as either a left back or left midfielder. He is the brother of model Abbey Clancy, who is married to fellow footballer Peter Crouch.

== Career ==
=== Blackpool ===
Born in Liverpool, Merseyside, he made his professional debut for Blackpool whilst still in secondary school at the age of 16. After playing two first team League 1 matches for Blackpool he left the club in 2006.

=== Southport ===
Following his departure from Blackpool, Clancy joined non-league outfit Southport in 2006 where he lasted just one season and played 11 league matches for the club.

=== Altrincham ===
Clancy briefly joined Altrincham in 2007 but only played 4 league matches before signing for Burscough.

=== Burscough ===
Clancy played for Burscough from 2007 to 2009 and enjoyed his most regular spell of first team matches having played 57 league matches and scoring one goal.

=== Fleetwood Town ===
In 2009, he signed for Fleetwood Town. He was included in the Conference North team of the season after scoring 18 goals from midfield in season 2009–10 while helping Fleetwood to win promotion to the Conference National via winning the play-off final at Fleetwood's own Highbury Stadium. After promotion Clancy was a regular for the club helping them achieve a play-off spot in their first season in the new league and achieving promotion to League Two. On 16 March 2012, Fleetwood Town announced that Clancy had joined Conference North side FC Halifax Town on loan until the end of the season. He was released by the club in May 2012.

=== Chester ===
In June 2012 he joined Chester, despite having offers from clubs at Conference Premier level.

=== Kidderminster Harriers ===
On 20 December 2012, Kidderminster Harriers signed Clancy on a non-contract deal following his exit from Conference North leaders Chester. He was released on 5 February 2013 after spending 6 weeks at the club.

=== Southport ===
Following his release from Kidderminster Harriers Clancy rejoined Southport on 23 February for the remainder of the season with a view to add a contract extension.

=== AFC Telford United ===
On 3 May 2013 it was announced that Clancy would join AFC Telford United, on the same day as his former Southport boss Watson joined the club. On 26 April 2014 he won promotion to the Conference Premier with Telford after they clinched the Conference North title in the final game of the season. He was released in May 2016.

== International career ==
Clancy has been included in two international squad lists. He missed the first due to personal circumstances but was called up a second time, making his debut for England C in the Challenge Trophy Final match against Portugal on 19 May 2011.
