= Britain's Next Top Model =

British reality television series

- Also known as: Britain & Ireland's Next Top Model (2011–13)
- Genre: Reality television
- Based on: Top Model by Tyra Banks
- Presented by: Lisa Butcher; Lisa Snowdon; Elle Macpherson; Abbey Clancy; Paul Sculfor; Cindy Bishop
- Judges: Marie Helvin; Jonathan Phang; Paula Hamilton; Gerry DeVeaux; Huggy Ragnarsson; Louis Mariette; Julien Macdonald; Charley Speed; Grace Woodward; Tyson Beckford; Whitney Port; Dannii Minogue; Hilary Alexander; Nicky Johnston; Max Rogers
- Countries of origin: United Kingdom; Ireland
- Original language: English
- No. of series: 12
- No. of episodes: 108

Production
- Running time: 60mins (inc. adverts)
- Production company: Thumbs Up Productions

Original release
- Network: Sky Living (2005–13); Lifetime (2016–17)
- Release: 14 September 2005 – 21 December 2017

Britain's Next Top Model (or Britain & Ireland's Next Top Model 2011–13), often abbreviated as BNTM, BINTM, or Top Model, is a British-Irish reality television show in which a number of women compete for the title of Britain's Next Top Model and a chance to start their career in the modelling industry. The first "cycle" premiered on 14 September 2005 on Sky Living.

The winner normally receives a modelling contract, cosmetics campaign, and a spread within a fashion magazine which also included appearing on the front cover. Other prizes which changed from cycle to cycle included a car, holiday, money, or an apartment among other things.

As part of the Top Model franchise, it was based on the American television series America's Next Top Model. From series 7 through 9, the show was named Britain and Ireland's Next Top Model as it had begun to include contestants from Ireland.

On 28 October 2013, Sky Living confirmed that the show had been cancelled. In April 2015, the show confirmed via its Twitter account that it would be returning in 2015 on Lifetime. The title was changed back to Britain's Next Top Model due to licensing issues, but contestants from Ireland were still allowed to apply for the show.

== Premise ==
Show logo used 2005–2016

The series features a group of young female contestants who live together in a house for several weeks while taking part in challenges, photo shoots and meetings with members of the modelling industry. Normally, one poor-performing contestant is eliminated each week until the last contestant remaining is declared "Britain's Next Top Model" and receives a modelling contract along with other prizes.

In a BBC interview, Elle Macpherson contrasted the show with the U.S. version, describing BNTM as "Uniquely British, the sense of humour and the styling is very British... more hybrid backgrounds... and I think that is really examplatory [sic] of what's going on in the UK today".

== Format ==
Each series of Britain's Next Top Model features from ten to fourteen episodes and begins with twelve to fourteen contestants. Each episode, one contestant is eliminated, though in rare cases a double elimination or no elimination is given by consensus of the judging panel. Series 6 saw a live finale where the public chose the winner of the cycle. The series was narrated by Fearne Cotton. Due to maternity leave, Cotton did not fulfil this role for the ninth series. She was replaced by Dawn Porter. When the show got revived on Lifetime, Dawn Porter was replaced by Cycle 5 and America's Next Top Model Cycle 18 contestant, Annaliese Dayes.

Starting with the ninth series, the elimination process was changed. Multiple contestants were in danger of elimination every week, with the number of contestants in danger being lowered as the competition progressed.

=== Judges ===
The series 9 panel consisted of Elle Macpherson, Tyson Beckford, and fashion designer, pop star, model, and former X Factor Judge Dannii Minogue. It was originally reported for series 8 that Grace Woodward would leaving the judging panel to be replaced by Kelly Osbourne and that both Charley Speed and Julien Macdonald would continue on the judging panel. However, it was later announced that both Speed and Woodward were leaving the panel to be replaced by Tyson Beckford and Whitney Port. Previous judges have included Lisa Butcher, Marie Helvin, Paula Hamilton, Huggy Ragnarsson, industry expert Jonathan Phang and fashion expert Gerry DeVeaux. Usually, an additional guest judge will sit in on the panel every week.

Judges	Cycles											
Judges	1	2	3	4	5	6	7	8	9	10	11	12
Hosts
Lisa Butcher	Main											
Lisa Snowdon		Main	Main	Main	Main							
Elle Macpherson						Main	Main	Main	Main			
Abbey Clancy		Contestant			Guest	Guest				Main	Main	Main
Paul Sculfor								Guest		Main	Main	
Judging panelists
Marie Helvin	Main											
Jonathan Phang	Main	Main	Main									
Paula Hamilton		Main	Main									
Gerry DeVeaux				Main								
Huggy Ragnarsson				Main	Main							
Louis Mariette					Main				Guest			
Julien Macdonald						Main	Main	Main				
Charley Speed						Main	Main					
Grace Woodward						Main	Main					
Tyson Beckford							Guest	Main	Main			
Whitney Port								Main				
Dannii Minogue									Main			
Hilary Alexander	Guest	Guest	Guest						Guest	Main	Main	
Nicky Johnston		Guest		Guest	Guest	Guest	Guest	Guest	Guest	Main	Main	Main
Max Rogers												Main
Cindy Bishop												Main

=== Requirements ===
According to the show's official site, anyone with the right to live or work in Britain is free to apply for the show, but must meet the height requirement of 5 ft 7 in (170 cm), and be between the ages of 18 and 23 at the time they try out for the show. This is true for series 6-8. During the first casting episode of cycle 7, some producers stated that 'The requirements would be stricter' in order to accommodate models closer within the range of the real fashion world.

=== Exhibition ===
Britain & Ireland's Next Top Model Live was launched by Media 10 in October 2010 at ExCeL London. The event was created to immerse members of the public into the Britain and Ireland's Next Top Model (BINTM) lifestyle. Bringing the TV series to life, the event gave every visitor the opportunity to experience the Top Model lifestyle for themselves. The show featured 45 minute catwalk shows, music performances from celebrities and an exhibition full of clothes and fashion accessories for visitors to purchase.

The 2011 Britain and Ireland's Next Top Model Live took place from 28 to 30 October at London ExCel.

== Cycles ==
Cycle	Premiere date	Winner	Runner-up	Other contestants in order of elimination	Number of contestants	International Destinations
1	14 September 2005	Lucy Ratcliffe	Edwina Joseph	Marina Fallahi, Claire Hillier, Shauna Breen, Anne Kent (quit), Hayley Wilkins, Marisa Heath, Stephanie Jones, Naomi Teal, Tashi Brown, Jenilee Harris	12	Paris; Milan
2	24 July 2006	Lianna Fowler	Abbey Clancy	Yvette Stubbs, Nina Malone, Asha Hibbert, Lucy Flower, Sophia Price, Samantha Gerrard, Tamar Higgs & Georgina Edewor-Thorley, Sarah Butler, Amber Niemann, Jasmia Robinson	13	Marrakesh
3	2 July 2007	Lauren McAvoy	Louise Watts	Dani Lawrence, Krystal Hancock, Abigail Galatia, Natalie Nwagbo, Holly Alexander Ritchie, Carly Thompson, Sherece Campbell, Lucy Bennett, Stefanie Webber, Rebecca White	12	Rio de Janeiro
4	21 April 2008	Alex Evans	Catherine Thomas	Sophie Roberts, Musayeroh Barrie, Louise Heywood, Lauren Donaldson-Stanley, Lynzi Arnott, Lisa Fowler, Martha Braddell & Leanne Nagle, Aaron Hunt, Charlotte Denton, Rachael Cairns, Stefanie Wilson	14	Cape Town
5	20 April 2009	Mecia Simson	Sophie Sumner	Lisa-Ann Hillman, Lauren Wee, Kasey Wynter & Chloe Cummings, Madeleine Wheatley, Hayley Buchanan, Annaliese Dayes, Daisy Payne, Viola Szekely, Ashley Brown, Jade McSorley	13	Reykjavík; Buenos Aires
6	5 July 2010	Tiffany Pisani	Alisha White	Hannah Goodeve (quit), Rachelle Harry, Susan Loughnane, Harleen Kaur Nottay, Delita Cole, Amba Hudson-Skye, Nicola Wright, Kirsty Parsons, Olivia Oldham-Stevens, Amelia Thomas, Charlotte Holmes, Joy McLaren	14	Alicante; Hardanger; Kuala Lumpur
7	4 July 2011	Jade Thompson	Juste Juozapaityte	Kimberleigh Spreadbury & Joanne Northey, Ufuoma Itoje, Hannah Devane, Holly Higgins & Amy Woodman, Tanya Mihailovic & Stacey Haskins, Jessica Abidde, Imogen Leaver & Anastasija Bogatirjova	13	Miami
8	9 July 2012	Letitia Herod	Emma Grattidge	Amelia Raven (quit), Emma Sharratt, Penelope Williamson, Tasmin Golding, Anne Winterburn, Kellie Forde, Jennifer Joint, Madeleine Taga, Roxanne O'Connor, Rissikat Oyebade, Lisa Madden, Anita Kaushik	14	Dubai; Paris; Toronto
9	20 June 2013	Lauren Lambert	Emma Ward & Sarah Kennedy	Christina Chalk, Danielle Sandhu, Jess Patterson, Abigail Johns, Laura Young, Emily Garner, Saffron Williams, Holly Carpenter, Angel Mbonu, Naomi Pelkiewicz, Sophie Ellson	14	Bridgetown
10	14 January 2016	Chloe Keenan	Angel Cole & Jessica Workman	Jasmine Hodge, Amreen Akhtar (quit), Alex Needham, Jenna McMahon, Megan Brunell & Georgia Butler, Billie Downes, Lexi Kelly, Bethan Sowerby	12	Zagreb; Ocho Rios
11	16 March 2017	Olivia Wardell	Jennifer Malengele	Anastasia Ellis, Abby Heaton, Victoria Clay, Eleanor Sippings (quit), Talulah-Eve Brown, Bianca Thomas, Chloe Lockley-Middleton, Simone Murphy, Tallulah Steed-Fassett, Alannah Beirne	12	Santa Maria
12	19 October 2017	Ivy Watson	Eleanor Sippings & Kira MacLean	Ocean Lane & Gabriella Jukes, Georgia Mason-Mottram, Alisia Grant, Tamsin Hough, Efi Muntoni-Clements (quit), Shaunagh Slattery & Louisa Northcote, Martha Miller (quit), Cirrah Leah Webb, Sophia Chawki	14	Bangkok; Ayutthaya

=== America's Next Top Model: British Invasion ===
In 2012, it was announced that seven past contestants would be appearing on Cycle 18 of America's Next Top Model. Both Cycles 1 and 7 were unrepresented. The returning contestants from Britain's Next Top Model and their placements for Cycle 18 were:

Previous BNTM Cycle / Series	Contestant	Original Rank	ANTM Cycle 18 Rank
2	Jasmia Robinson	3rd	14th
3	Louise Watts	Runner-up	12th
5	Ashley Brown	4th	10th
4	Catherine Thomas	Runner-up	6th
6	Alisha White	Runner-up	4th
5	Annaliese Dayes	7th	3rd
5	Sophie Sumner	Runner-up	Winner

The contestant was eliminated.
The contestant quit the competition.
The contestant won the competition.

This is the first ANTM Cycle to feature a non-American winner, and the first in which more than one contestant decided to quit during the season.

=== Juste Juozapaityte ===
In 2014, cycle 7 runner-up Juste Juozapaityte participated on Top Model po-russki's (the Russian adaptation of Top Model) fifth cycle, which included contestants from Russia and contestants from other countries with Russian roots. Juozapaityte, from London, was born in Lithuania and is of Russian descent. She finished in second place to Zhenya Nekrasova of Kemerovo.
