= Gabriel Donoso =

Chilean polo player

Gabriel Donoso celebrating

Gabriel Donoso Rosselot (28 June 1960 – 10 November 2006) was a Chilean polo player, considered one of Chile's best polo players of all time. He was born in Santiago, Chile.

Donoso led the Chilean side that won the Coronation Cup in 2004 defeating British. He won the player of the tournament award presented by Queen Elizabeth II.

Donoso suffered multiple injuries when he fell from a horse during a match in Pilar, Buenos Aires, Argentina. He died a few days later in a hospital in Buenos Aires of injuries related to the fall.

Donoso was previously married to and had two children (singer Amber Donoso and model Olivia Donoso) with UK model Lisa Butcher.
