= Firefly Tonics =

Firefly logo

Firefly Tonics is an English producer of fruit juice drinks with added herbal extracts. The range includes a number of functional drinks that feature botanical extracts such as green tea, dandelion, nettle, yerba mate and kola nut mixed with fruit juices.

Firefly was founded in 2003 by Harry Briggs and Marcus Waley-Cohen, two London-based entrepreneurs. The herbal formulas for the drinks were developed with two UK-based herbalists, Michael McIntyre and Andrew Chevallier. The drink was launched with four variants, in Harvey Nichols, London in July 2003.

Firefly Tonics Ltd. is based in central London and employs 8 people. As at May 2013, Firefly drinks are sold in 40 countries, with sales to date of over 25 million bottles. Around half the company's sales are within the UK.

== Products ==
The classic range of Firefly drinks consists of 5 variants, packaged in 330ml glass bottles and named by their principal ingredients / flavours: e.g., "Lemon, Lime & Ginger". There are additional variants in 500ml PET and 750ml glass bottles.

== Discontinued products ==
In 2008 the company launched "Firefly Water" - a naturally low-calorie spring water drink with antioxidant-rich teas such as Green tea, White tea. Firefly Water was Britain's first enhanced water to be organic certified, and won "Best new functional drink" at the International Beverage Innovation Awards. The drinks were discontinued in 2009 due to poor sales.

== Books ==
In 2006, Firefly published a book to support local independent cafés in London, The Firefly Guide to Café Culture (ISBN 0-9551712-0-2).
