= Abbey Clancy =

English model and television personality

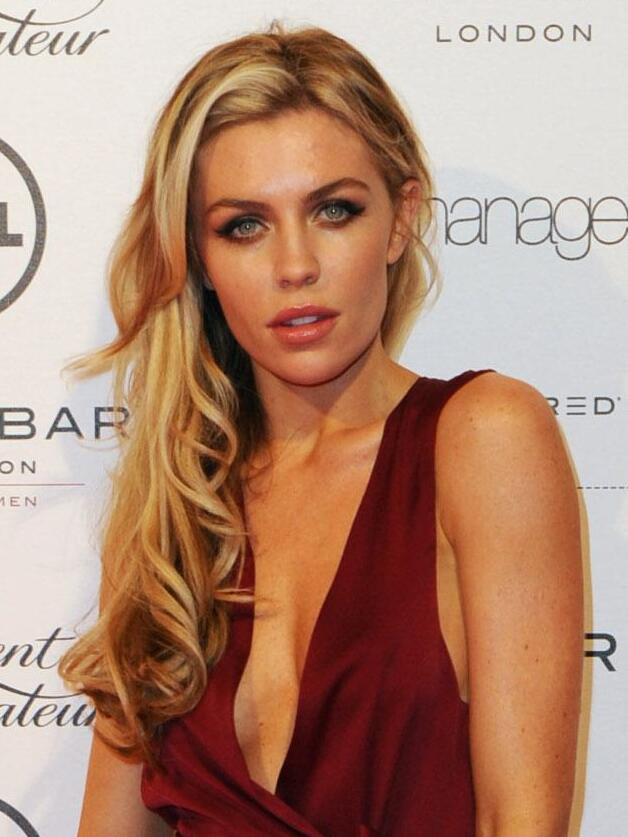
- Clancy in 2012
- Born: Abigail Marie Clancy; 10 January 1986 (age 40); Liverpool, England
- Occupations: Model; television personality
- Spouse: Peter Crouch (m. 2011)
- Children: 4
- Relatives: Sean Clancy (brother)
- Modelling information
- Height: 5 ft 9 in (1.75 m)
- Hair colour: Blonde
- Eye colour: Blue

Abigail Marie Clancy (born 10 January 1986) is an English model and television personality. She was runner-up on second series of Britain's Next Top Model in 2006, and went on to win the eleventh series of Strictly Come Dancing in 2013. She presented Britain's Next Top Model from 2015 till the show's cancellation in 2017.

== Early life ==
Born in Liverpool, Clancy is one of four children of Karen (née Sullivan) and Geoffrey Thomas Clancy. She grew up in Woolton, a suburb of Liverpool, and attended St Mary's Primary School and St Julie's Catholic High School. Clancy formed girl band Genie Queen while she worked at a boutique. They were managed by Andy McCluskey from Orchestral Manoeuvres in the Dark.

== Career ==
=== Modelling ===
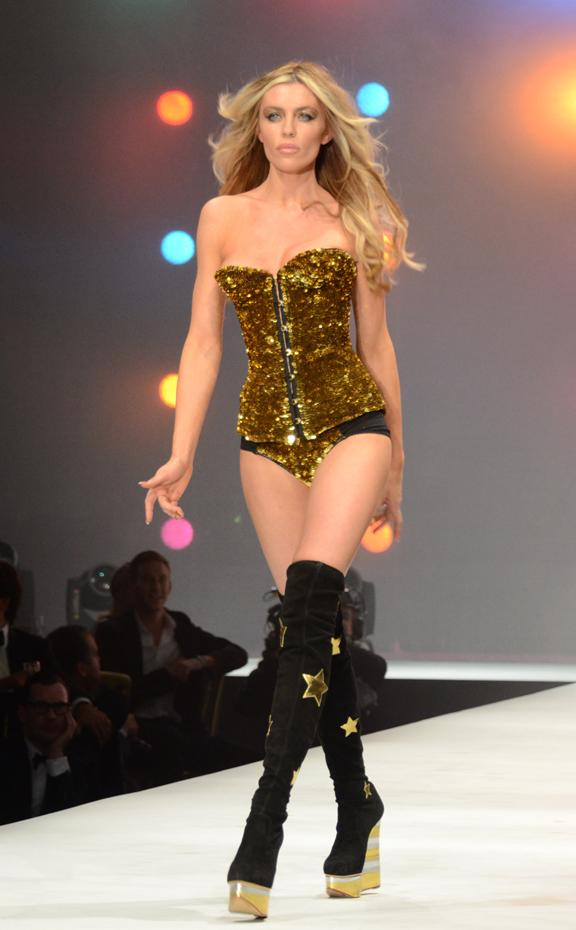
Clancy on the catwalk in 2012

In summer 2006, the second cycle of Living TV's Britain's Next Top Model included Clancy as one of the thirteen candidates in the competition, competing over 10 weeks for a modelling contract. Clancy made it to the final runway show with fellow contestant Lianna Fowler, eventually becoming the runner up.

After appearing on Britain's Next Top Model, Clancy modelled for several magazines and newspapers. In May 2007, Clancy appeared on the cover of Arena magazine, and modelled the Triumph Bonneville Motorbike. Clancy was chosen to appear in Sports Illustrated magazine in the 2010 swimsuit edition. Clancy was featured for her sporting connection to Peter Crouch and was photographed for the magazine wearing only body paint to make it appear as if she was wearing an England shirt, shot by Yu Tsai.

Clancy appeared in a 2010 campaign for Umbro sportswear, modelling an England shirt, along with other footballer's wives and girlfriends from countries that have won the World Cup. Clancy walked in the Giles Deacon Ready-To-Wear line Giles Spring 2011 collection.

In March 2011, Clancy appeared on the Elite Model Management: New York division website. In July 2013, she appeared as part of London designer Hasan Hejazi's campaign, in a fashion editorial by Absynth Photographic and a fashion film by Gabriel Gettman. Clancy also modelled for the August 2011 cover of UK Esquire shot by photographer Sølve Sundsbø.

In December 2013, Clancy was featured in LOVE magazine's Advent Calendar alongside Suki Waterhouse and Cara Delevingne.

In July 2014, Clancy appeared on the cover of British Marie Claire and in March 2015, British Elle.

In October 2019, Clancy and her daughter Sophia Crouch collaborated with Lipsy, a London-based fashion brand, for the Launch of their AW’19 collection. In January 2020, the AW’19 collection was launched in UAE.

=== Television ===
Clancy has appeared as a talking head in the documentaries Slave to Fashion and The Ultimate Bikini Guide for Channel 4, as a guest on programmes such as Richard & Judy, The Chris Moyles Show, Friday Night with Jonathan Ross, GMTV, This Morning and in her own reality TV series Abbey and Janice: Beauty and the Best which followed her attempts to break the Los Angeles modelling scene with Janice Dickinson as her mentor. The show aired from 14 May to 18 June 2007 on Living TV.

Clancy featured in the third series of Hell's Kitchen. She was the third contestant to be voted off the show by the public, and the fifth to leave overall.

On 10 May 2009, Clancy featured on Chris Moyles' Quiz Night alongside Patsy Kensit. She won her episode and was the overall winner of the first series.

Clancy also co-hosted the ITV2 series, The Fashion Show with model Michelle de Swarte and George Lamb. Her cousin Chloe Cummings, made the top 13 contestants in the fifth cycle of Britain's Next Top Model, of which Clancy herself was a guest in episode 8, being the first ex-contestant from the Top Model franchise to appear on the judging panel.

On 22 December 2009, Clancy appeared as a "contestant" on a spoof version of Blind Date as part of an episode of Alan Carr: Chatty Man in which Cilla Black was a guest.

In April 2010, Clancy was featured in ITV2's The Parent Trip along with her mother Karen. She also appeared as a panellist on A League of Their Own.

Clancy was a regular guest on James Corden's World Cup Live.

She also co-hosted the reality TV show Great British Hairdresser in 2011.

In 2013, Clancy competed on series 11 of Strictly Come Dancing. Her professional partner was newcomer and Burn the Floor dancer, Aljaž Škorjanec. On 30 November 2013, they received the series' 1st perfect 40, during Musicals Week. On December 21, they were announced as the series' winners.

In 2015, Clancy was announced as the new host for a revived series of Britain's Next Top Model, ten years after she began her own career on the show.

In June 2023, ITV commissioned Abbey Clancy's Celebrity Homes, an upcoming interior design show presented by Clancy.

=== Book ===
In March 2016, Clancy's first novel, Remember My Name, was published.

== Other media ==
In 2019, Clancy cameoed as an angel in the promotional video for the song "In Another Life" by British rock band the Darkness. Clancy regularly co-hosts the successful podcast The Therapy Crouch with husband Peter.

== Media recognition ==
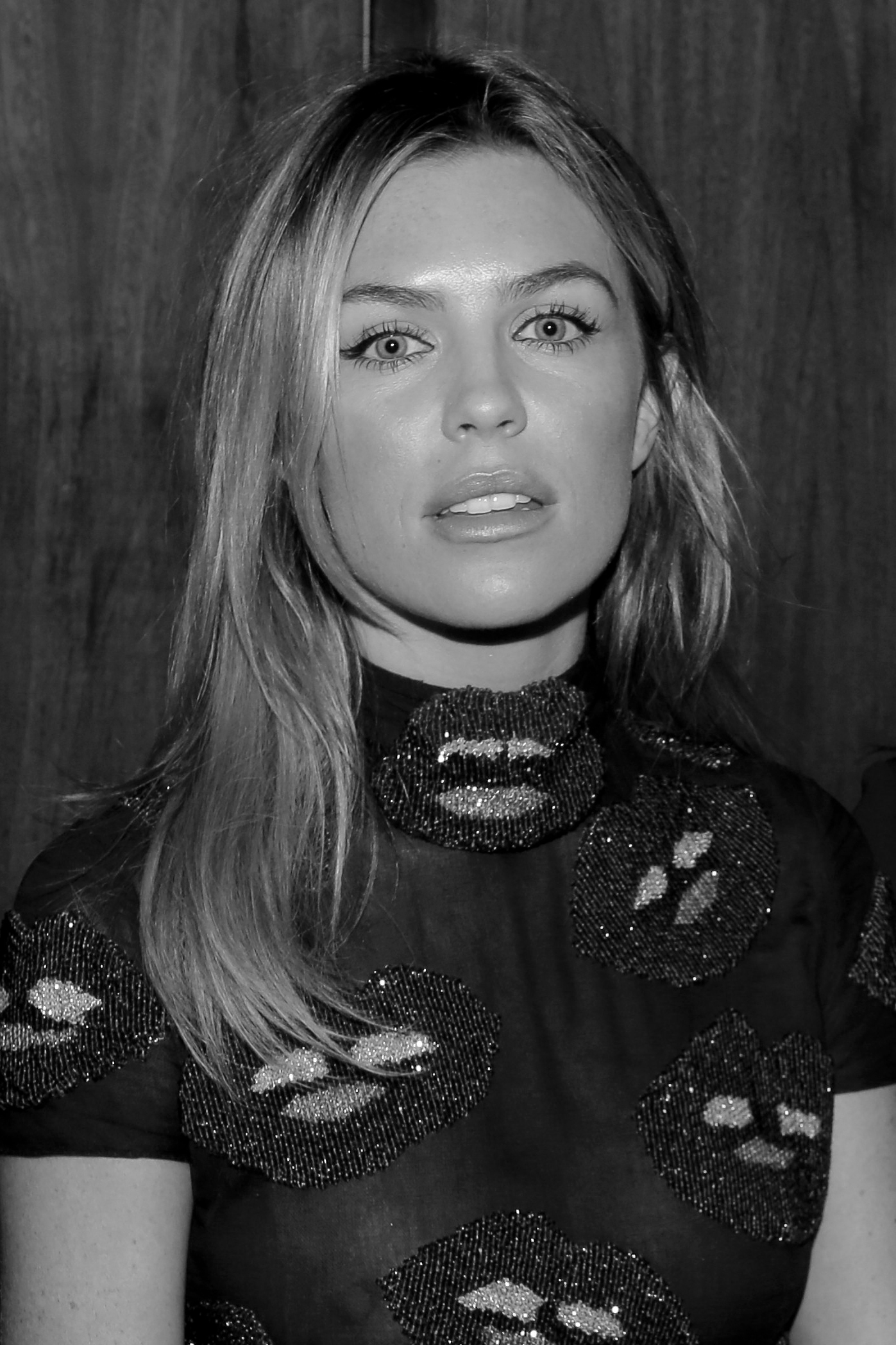
Clancy in 2014

Clancy was ranked 37th in FHM magazine's annual 100 Sexiest Women poll of 2007 and 55th the following year. In 2009, Clancy had moved up to 12th place, and in 2010, she went up to 10th place in the annual poll.

In July 2012, The Sun announced Clancy as their exclusive Beauty Columnist writer. Clancy was subsequently widely criticised in her home town of Liverpool, as the city had boycotted the newspaper for printing false allegations against supporters of Liverpool Football Club in the aftermath of the Hillsborough disaster in 1989. Clancy publicly apologised for the Sun column soon after.

== Personal life ==
Clancy's brother Sean is a footballer who played for A.F.C. Telford United. He was also a member of the cast of the short-lived E4 reality series Desperate Scousewives.

She started dating footballer Peter Crouch in 2006. The couple were engaged in July 2009.

On 30 June 2011, Clancy and Crouch married. They have two daughters and two sons.
