= Lisa Snowdon =

English television presenter (born 1972)

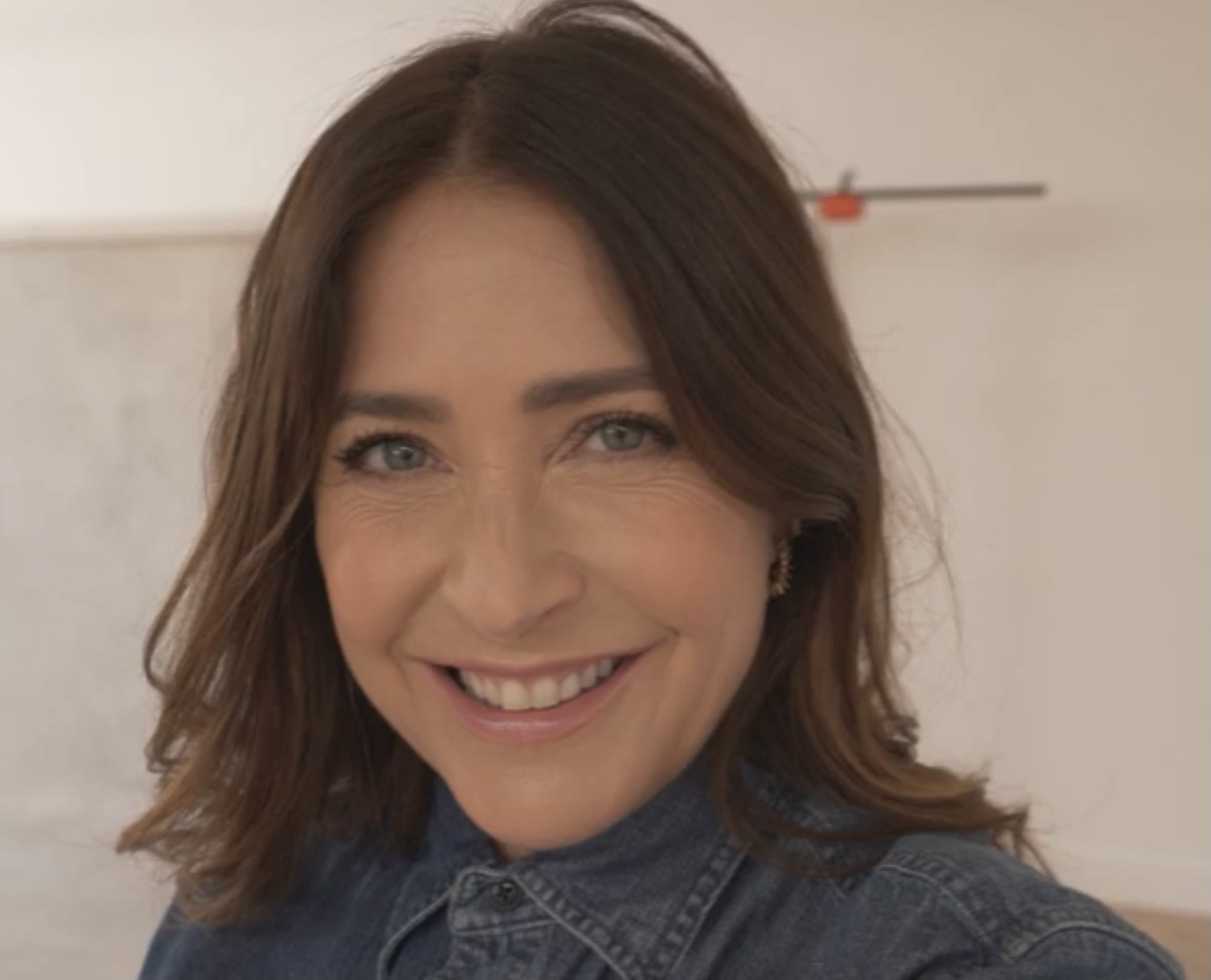
- Snowdon in 2024
- Born: Lisa Snawdon; 23 January 1972 (age 54); Welwyn Garden City, Hertfordshire, England
- Education: Italia Conti Academy of Theatre Arts
- Occupations: Television presenter; radio presenter; fashion model
- Modelling information
- Height: 5 ft 10 in (178 cm)
- Hair colour: Brown
- Eye colour: Blue
- Website: Official website

Lisa Snowdon (born Lisa Snawdon; 23 January 1972) is an English television and radio presenter and fashion model. She was the host of the Living TV reality television show Britain's Next Top Model from 2006 until 2009. She also co-presented Capital Breakfast on Capital London from August 2008 until 18 December 2014.

== Early life ==
Snowdon was born in Welwyn Garden City to insurance salesman Nigel and hairdresser Lydia Snawdon.

Snowdon had an abortion in her 20s.

== Modelling ==
A fan of Christy Turlington from age 14, Snowdon never thought about becoming a model. Spotted by a Premier Model Management agent at age 19 while dancing at a rave at London's MFI club, she was auditioned and signed up. She started working with renowned photographers and became one of Britain's top fashion models.

Snowdon is best known for her beauty commercials and high-fashion cover and spread modelling, including cover shots for Later, Vogue, Marie Claire and Elle; she was also the face for Gucci.

She later appeared in advertisements for Mercedes-Benz, Dove soap, and Kelloggs Special K, and was the face of campaigns for Neutrogena and After Eight mint straws, the Taxiwise safety campaign and numerous catalogues. Her modelling career led to appearances in Maxim, Arena, Loaded and GQ.

Snowdon returned to modelling when she became the face and model of Avon lingerie, and was one of the models for the Marks & Spencer autumn 2010 campaign. From 2010–2014 she was the face of Belvita breakfast biscuits, appearing in adverts for the biscuits with fellow Capital FM DJ Johnny Vaughan. In 2015 she was appointed the lead-UK model for Triumph International.

== Television ==
Snowdon's first presenting role was in 2003 on BBC3's Fightbox - a children's show in which contestants created 'avatars' to battle each other. Later she presented on MTV UK's MTV Select. She took over the role from Lisa Butcher as the "supermodel" judge and host on Britain's Next Top Model. Snowdon left the show to concentrate on her radio show and was replaced by Elle Macpherson as of season six. In autumn 2007, she was announced as the new co-presenter of Through the Keyhole with Sir David Frost on BBC One.

Snowdon had a starring role in Channel 4's short film Man's Best Friend. She also had a cameo role in Channel 4 programme, Plus One.

In 2014, Snowdon co-hosted Weekend Kitchen with Waitrose with Steve Jones. The show aired on Saturday mornings on Channel 4.

In August 2016, Snowdon guest presented five episodes of Lorraine, standing in for Lorraine Kelly. In November 2016, Snowdon was confirmed as a contestant for the sixteenth series of I'm a Celebrity...Get Me Out of Here!. She was voted off as the second celebrity to leave the jungle coming in second last place to her camp-mate Danny Baker.

In September 2022, Snowdon was crowned winner of the seventeenth series of Celebrity Masterchef.

=== Strictly Come Dancing ===
Snowdon took part in the sixth series of Strictly Come Dancing, and was partnered with Brendan Cole. They made the final and finished in 3rd place.

Week #	Dance / Song	Judges' scores					Result
Week #	Dance / Song	Horwood	Philips	Goodman	Tonioli	Total	Result
2	Salsa / "Rhythm is Gonna Get You"	5	5	6	6	22	Safe
4	Rumba / "Suddenly"	8	8	8	8	32	Safe
5	American Smooth / "It Happened in Monterey"	8	9	9	9	35	Safe
6	Paso doble / "Eye of the Tiger"	7	7	7	7	28	Safe
7	Tango / "La cumparsita"	8	9	9	9	35	Safe
8	Viennese waltz / "Bed of Roses"	9	9	9	9	36	Safe
9	Samba / "Rock the Boat"	6	7	9	8	30	Bottom two
10	Quickstep / "Yes"	8	9	9	9	35	Bottom two
11	Foxtrot / "Walkin' My Baby Back Home"; Cha-cha-cha / "Tears Dry on Their Own"	9; 9	10; 9	10; 10	10; 10	39; 38	Safe
12	Waltz / "He Was Beautiful"; Jive / "Crocodile Rock"	9; 8	10; 8	10; 8	10; 9	39; 33	Bottom two
13	Argentine tango / "Infiltrado"; Quickstep / "Dancing in the Dark"	8; 10	8; 10	10; 10	9; 10	35; 40	No elimination
14	Foxtrot / "Walkin' My Baby Back Home"; Cha-cha-cha / "Tears Dry on Their Own"	10; 10	10; 10	10; 10	10; 10	40; 40	3rd place

== Radio ==
At the end of August 2008, it was announced that Snowdon was to be the permanent replacement for Denise van Outen on Capital London as co-host with Jonny Vaughan. In January 2010, the pair signed a two-year deal to continue presenting the show. On 1 December 2011 it was confirmed she would remain at Capital.

Snowdon was given the nickname 'Eggy' on the show by colleague Dave Berry after her penchant for boiled eggs and the smell they gave off in the studio. On 13 November 2015, she announced that she would be leaving Capital Breakfast at the end of 2015.

== Charitable activities ==
In 2005, Snowdon became an ambassador for the Breast Cancer Care charity.

In 2008, Snowdon participated in a celebrity edition of The Apprentice as part of the BBC's biennial Sport Relief event. In 2010, she became an Ambassador of Capital FM's Help a Capital Child charity.

In November 2010, after turning on the Bond Street Christmas Lights, Snowdon was rushed to hospital and diagnosed with viral meningitis. As a result, she began raising money and acting as an ambassador for the Meningitis Trust.

== Personal life ==
Snowdon dated Dave Loeffler from US band E.Y.C. for three years.

She suffered a miscarriage in 2013. In 2014, Snowdon began a relationship with George Smart and the two eventually became engaged in 2016. The relationship ended in 2026.

== Book ==
- Just Getting Started: Lessons in Life, Love and Menopause (HarperCollins, May 2023) ISBN 978-0008605483

== See also ==
- List of I'm a Celebrity...Get Me Out of Here! (British TV series) contestants
- List of Strictly Come Dancing contestants
