= Lisa Butcher =

British model

- Born: 14 October 1971 (age 55); London, England
- Occupations: Fashion model; TV presenter
- Height: 6 ft 0 in (1.83 m)
- Spouses: Marco Pierre White (m. 1992; div. 1992); Gabriel Donoso (m. 1993; died 2006)
- Children: 2

Lisa Butcher (born 14 October 1971) is a former English fashion model and TV presenter.

== Career ==
Butcher won British Elle's first ELLE's Angels modelling competition in 1987, judged by Marie Helvin, Laraine Ashton, and photographer Terry O'Neill. Her first job after she finished school was for Ralph Lauren in New York.

Royal photographer Norman Parkinson called Butcher the "Face of the '90s", and she appeared on the covers of Vogue, Elle, Marie Claire, Harpers and Queen and Tatler. She has also appeared in numerous commercials including for Max Factor, Olympus Cameras, Vision Express, Lancaster, Vidal Sassoon, Pirelli, Clarion mascara and Onebiol moisturiser.

Butcher appeared regularly at the prêt-à-porter shows in Paris, Milan and New York until she became a mother for the first time in 1995. As a mother of two Butcher works exclusively from London. She has modelled for many brands, including Yves Saint Laurent, Ferritti Jeans and John Galliano. She has also been the face of Hardy Amies since 2003.

Butcher has her own jewellery collection, the Eden Collection.

=== TV presenter ===
Butcher first appeared on TV with an appearance on The Big Breakfast alongside Chris Evans. Due to her demanding schedule, she shelved her TV career until she appeared, years later, as the host for Living TV's Britain's Next Top Model.

After it was announced that Trinny Woodall and Susannah Constantine would be defecting to ITV, Butcher and her friend singer Mica Paris were announced in April 2006 as the new presenters of BBC1s fashion show What Not to Wear.

=== TV production company ===
Butcher formed Libra Productions under the umbrella of Alchemy.

== Personal life ==
Butcher married her first husband, chef Marco Pierre White, when she was 21 – Albert Roux was best man, but the union lasted just 15 weeks. They met at Tramp, the Jermyn Street nightclub, and were married three weeks later at the Brompton Oratory in Knightsbridge. White claimed that he was intoxicated by her looks, but it did not help the marriage when, after being asked by a reporter what he thought of his bride's £3,000-floor-length, backless white dress designed by Bruce Oldfield, White said she looked dressed to go down the catwalk rather than the aisle.

Her partners after this have included actor Jeremy Northam, entrepreneur Damian Aspinall, Jonathan Rhys Meyers; and then 24-year-old Jacobi Anstruther-Gough-Calthorpe.

Butcher's second husband was Chilean polo player Gabriel Donoso – the father of her two children – who died in 2006. Her two daughters, are singer Amber Donoso and model Olivia Donoso.
