= Marie Helvin =

American fashion model

- Born: August 13, 1952; Tokyo, Japan
- Years active: 1967–2009
- Spouse: David Bailey (m. 1975; div. 1985)
- Modeling information
- Height: 5 ft 9 in (175 cm)
- Hair color: Brown
- Eye color: Brown

Marie Helvin (born August 13, 1952) is a British-based American former fashion model, who worked extensively with David Bailey, to whom she was married between 1975 and 1985. In the 1970s and 1980s, she appeared in many fashion stories for British Vogue and posed for a series of nude photographs made by Bailey, which were published in his 1980 book Trouble and Strife. They would collaborate on four more photographic books and continued to work on multiple stories for the British, French and Italian editions of Vogue.

== Biography ==
Helvin was born in 1952 in Tokyo, where her American G.I. father of French and Danish descent had married a local interpreter of Japanese descent. She was brought up in Hawaii from the age of four.

She was approached by a model scout on a visit to Japan with her mother and signed up as the face of Kanebo cosmetics at 15. She moved to London, where she worked for designers such as Yves Saint Laurent, Versace and Valentino, and married photographer David Bailey when she was 23, having met him when he chose her for a photographic session for Vogue. Together Bailey and Helvin produced a book of nudes titled Trouble and Strife in 1980. The marriage lasted ten years.

In the 1980s, Helvin left mainstream modelling, working for television and radio, covering subjects from books to travel, which in turn led to major television, radio and advertising campaigns, such as for Yves Saint Laurent and Olympus cameras. She launched her own collection of body/swimwear range in 1990 and went on to produce seasonal collections. She published two books, made a health and fitness video, appeared on television and presented several programmes including GMTV's series Helvin on Hawaii, which featured her philosophies on health and beauty.

In 2006 she appeared as a judge in Britain's Next Top Model, and with appearances in British Vogue and the US W magazine, features in Sunday Times, and a retrospective in Harper's Bazaar. She appeared on her 7th British Vogue cover in 2007. Her autobiography was released in late 2007 and published in paperback in September 2008. The Sunday Times called the book "funny, naughty, sexy, revelatory".

Helvin returned to Japan to present a look at fashion and innovation in modern Japan in 'Marie Helvin's Tokyo', part of the Luxury Life series on CNBC. In February 2009, she launched Marks & Spencer PORTFOLIO fashion range for women in their fifties. In late 2009 she featured as the face of a new demi couture range of lingerie from Agent Provocateur, "Soiree". In December 2009, Helvin auctioned her personal collection of vintage clothing from the 1970s-1990s.

In January 2024, at the age of 71 Helvin posed for Bluebella Lingerie's Valentine's Day campaign.

== Bibliography ==
- Helvin, M. (2008). Marie Helvin: The Autobiography. London: Orion. ISBN 978-0-7538-2415-3.
- Helvin, M. (1985). Catwalk: the art of model style. London: Pavilion. ISBN 978-0-907516-64-4.
- Helvin, M.; Atkinson L. (1995). Bodypure: your complete detox programme for health and beauty. London: Headline. ISBN 978-0-7472-5076-0.
- Helvin, Marie (2007). The Autobiography. London: Weidenfeld & Nicolson. ISBN 978-0-297-85311-4.
