= Uli Weber =

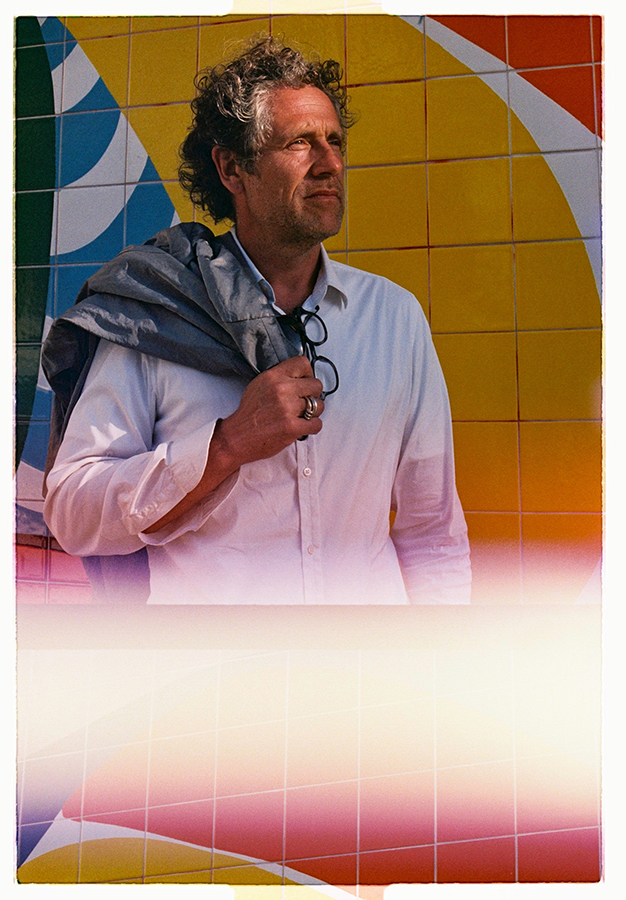
- Weber by Lily Betrand Webb
- Born: January 21, 1964 (age 62); Ulm, West Germany
- Occupation: Photographer
- Website: www.uliweber.com www.uliweber-fineart.com

Uli Weber (born January 21, 1964) is a German photographer.

== Biography ==
Born in Germany and trained in Rome, Weber divides his time between London and Italy. Celebrated for his mastery of fine art photography and portraiture, Weber has been compared by critic Ivan Shaw, former Photography Director at American Vogue, to legendary masters such as Henri Cartier-Bresson and August Sander. His evocative images have been exhibited in prestigious institutions around the world, including the Victoria and Albert Museum in London and the National Gallery of Victoria in Melbourne, as well as in iconic venues such as the Saatchi Gallery and Christie’s.

His first book, Portraits, published by Skira in 2010, immortalizes icons from the worlds of culture, fashion, cinema and music, including Sting, Kylie Minogue, Kate Moss, Jeremy Irons, Bruce Willis and Oscar Niemeyer, with exhibitions in London, New York and Milan.

In 2014, Weber’s photographic art took a new turn when the Duke of Richmond invited him to document the Goodwood Revival, a historic vintage car race. The book, also published by Skira and bearing the name of the event, Goodwood Revival, is now a classic in the world of art and vintage car collecting, as predicted by driver Sir Jackie Stewart, who described it as a “lovely book . . . going to be much loved by a great many people”. In addition to the works being displayed in various international museums and exhibition spaces, the publication went on to win an award of excellence from the Communication Arts Awards in 2015.

The year 2018 saw the publication of The Allure of Horses, an extraordinary volume by Assouline, a publisher specializing in luxury culture, which encapsulates Weber’s five years of work on the deep bond between humans and horses. Presented in London and Milan, amongst other places, the book inspired a series created for Hackett London in 2019, featuring fine art photos of polo: dazzling shots that highlight the symbiosis between player and horse, earning the artist a solo exhibition at Christie’s, where the photos were subsequently auctioned.

In 2022, Weber presented two retrospective exhibitions: Seductions, accompanied by a book of the same name published by il Cigno CC Edizioni, at Palazzo Riso in Palermo, Sicily’s leading museum of modern and contemporary art; and Moments at Ljubljana Castle, Slovenia’s most important exhibition space.

The 2024 collaboration with the Italian Ministry of Culture and Cinecittà has led to the publication of Dive & Madrine in the Electa Photo series, featuring Weber’s reinterpretation of historic film portraits from the archives of the Istituto Luce and Magnum, creating a bridge between the icons of Italian cinema past and present. Previewed at the Venice Film Festival, accompanied by a major exhibition, the project was acclaimed by critics and audiences alike. The book went on to earn industry recognition when it won second prize in the Professional Book category at the 2025 International Photography Awards.

In 2025, Il Mezzogiorno ("The South"), Weber's sixth publication, was launched in Tricase, Apulia. This event was co-presented by Academy Award-winning actress Helen Mirren, whose text also features in the volume alongside a foreword by the critic Denis Curti. Published by Electa Photo, the book presents a visual exploration of Southern Italy - Sicily, Calabria, Sardinia, Apulia, and Abruzzo, among its regions - and highlights the contrasts of landscape, history, and human influence that define the area, also known as Il Mezzogiorno. A portion of the proceeds from the publication supports the non-profit organisation Save the Olives, which combats the Xylella fastidiosa bacterium affecting olive trees in Southern Italy and is supported by its advisory member and spokesperson, Dame Helen Mirren.

== Books ==
- Weber, Uli (2010). Portraits. Skira. ISBN 9788857207032.
- Weber, Uli (2014). Goodwood Revival. Skira. ISBN 9788857222936.
- Weber, Uli (2018). The Allure Of Horses. Assouline. ISBN 9781614287315.
- Weber, Uli (2022). Seductions. Il Cigno GG Edizioni. ISBN 9788878314801.
- Weber, Uli (2024). Dive & Madrine. ElectaPhoto. ISBN 9788892826793.
- Weber, Uli (2025). Il Mezzogiorno. ElectaPhoto. ISBN 9788892828179.

== Exhibitions ==
=== Solo ===
- 2010, Portraits, The Hospital Club, London, United Kingdom
- 2011, Portraits, La Rinascente Palermo, Italy
- 2011, Portraits, La Rinascente Milan, Italy
- 2012, Portraits, Palazzo Vernazza, Lecce, Italy
- 2012, Portraits, Ten43 Gallery, New York City, United States
- 2015, Goodwood Revival, San Babila, Milan, Italy
- 2015, Goodwood Revival, Museo storico della città di Lecce, Italy
- 2016, Goodwood Revival, Sunbeam Studios, London, United Kingdom
- 2018, The Allure of Horses, Maison Assouline, London, United Kingdom
- 2019, Hackett London & Polo 150, Christie's auction house, London, United Kingdom
- 2019, The Allure of Horses, Castello di Carlo V, Lecce, Italy
- 2019, The Allure of Horses, Fabbrica Del Vapore, Milan, Italy
- 2021, Quid Pluris: looking beyond, Palazzo Maresgallo, Lecce, Italy
- 2022, Seductions, Palazzo Riso, Palermo, Italy
- 2022, Moments, The Ljubljana Castle, Ljubljana, Slovenia
- 2023, Goodwood Revival, MIA, Bocconi Art Gallery, Milan, Italy
- 2024, Revival: Goodwood vs Maranello, Mercanteinfiera Spring 2024, Parma, Italy
- 2024, Dive & Madrine, 81st Biennale Film Festival, Venice, Italy
- 2024, L'Italia baciata dalla luna, Italian Cultural Institute, London, United Kingdom
- 2025, I am. We are. Liberty, London, United Kingdom
- 2026, Goodwood Revival, Brunello Cucinelli, London, United Kingdom

=== Group ===
- 2007, Kylie Minogue, Victoria and Albert Museum, London, United Kingdom
- 2012, Sunday Times Magazine, Saatchi Gallery, London, United Kingdom
- 2015, The Last Supper, Grattacielo Pirelli, Milan, Italy
- 2016, Viktor and Rolf exhibition, National Gallery of Victoria, Melbourne, Australia
- 2017, John Rocha, The Calm Photography Movement, London, United Kingdom
- 2021, Blocks, Museo Riso di Arte Contemporanea e Moderna, Italy
- 2021, Abgefahren - das Auto in der Kunst, Künstlerhaus Marktoberdorf, Germany
- 2023, Terna Driving Energy Award, Palazzo delle Esposizioni, Rome, Italy

== Awards ==
- 2015, Goodwood Revival, Winner of the Photobook Category, Communication Arts Awards (CA)
- 2020, Polo, Winner of the Advertising Category, Communication Arts Awards (CA)
- 2023, Alter Ego, Editor's Picks, LensCulture Art Awards
- 2023, Tunisia, Lago Salato, Finalist of the Terna Driving Energy Award
- 2025, Dive & Madrine, 2nd place Portrait Photobook, International Photography Awards (IPA)
- 2026, Il Mezzogiorno, 3rd place Monograph Photobook, International Photography Awards (IPA)
- 2026, Il Mezzogiorno, Selected Winner, American Photography 42 annual Awards (AI-AP)
