= Hilary Alexander =

Fashion journalist (1946–2023)

Hilary Alexander OBE
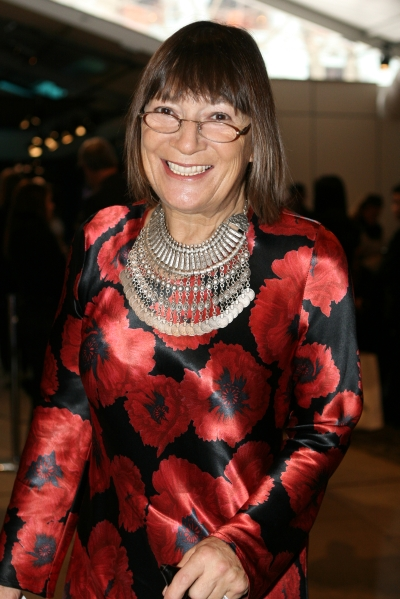
- Alexander in 2008
- Born: 5 February 1946; Napier, New Zealand
- Died: 5 February 2023 (aged 77); London, England
- Occupation: Journalist

Hilary Alexander OBE (5 February 1946 – 5 February 2023) was a New Zealand-born British journalist and past fashion director of the Daily Telegraph. She was twice named Journalist of the Year (1997 and 2003) in the British Fashion Awards. She was editor-at-large for Hello Fashion Monthly and freelanced as a stylist and broadcaster.

== Career ==
Born in Napier, New Zealand, Alexander began her career as a journalist at the age of 16 as a trainee reporter for the Manawatu Evening Standard, before becoming a reporter for The Evening Post and The Dominion in Wellington. She continued to work as a journalist in Australia for the Ballarat Courier and the Wollongong Mercury, before becoming the fashion editor of The China Mail and features editor of the Hong Kong Standard based in Hong Kong. She became the fashion editor of the Daily Telegraph in January 1985 before becoming fashion director in 2003.

In June 2011, the British Fashion Council and the Daily Telegraph hosted a party to celebrate Alexander's career in fashion. An amusing video titled Hilary Alexander Tribute was specially commissioned for the event, complete with quotes from colleagues and friends including Sir Philip Green, Claudia Schiffer, Suzy Menkes, Stephen Jones (milliner) and Harold Tillman who affectionately described her as a "larger-than-life character" and "workaholic".

Also in 2011 Diane von Fürstenberg, serving as president of the Council of Fashion Designers of America, paid tribute to Alexander as an "incredible force" when she won the CFDA's special Eugenia Sheppard Media Award. Designer Michael Kors who presented the award called her "unsinkable".

In April 2013, Alexander marked the death of former prime minister Margaret Thatcher with an analysis for the Daily Telegraph of her status as "a global style icon", explaining how her image was "beyond the dictates of any designer, let alone the catwalk". It also detailed the origins of the verb to handbag somebody, a reference to Thatcher's accessory as a symbol of her style of government.

== TV work ==
Alexander had extensive experience in television that included three years on BBC 2’s Style Challenge, appearances on GMTV, Lorraine Kelly, BBC Breakfast and various documentaries for BBC One, BBC Two and Channel 4. She also appeared on national channels in Germany, France, Spain, Russia and China; Weakest Link and Strictly Come Dancing: It Takes Two (BBC); and was often interviewed for some fashion cable channels including Fashion File, Fashion TV and Video Fashion as well as for some radio stations. Alexander was the regular stylist and presenter for the Designer Catwalk shows at the annual Clotheshow Live in Birmingham. She was the featured stylist in the Living TV series Britain's Next Top Model in 2005 and 2006 and also appeared in the 2016 series.

== Honours ==
In May 2001, Alexander was awarded the title Visiting Professor by the University of the Arts London (the former London Institute) which is responsible for the fashion colleges, Central Saint Martins and London College of Fashion and the Chelsea and Camberwell Art colleges. In November 2007, she received the honorary degree Doctor of Design from Nottingham Trent University.

Alexander was appointed Officer of the Order of the British Empire (OBE) in the 2013 Birthday Honours for services to fashion journalism.

== Death ==
Alexander died in London on 5 February 2023, her 77th birthday.

At her death, she had 249,800 followers on Twitter.
