= Jonathan Phang =

British food writer and chef

Jonathan Phang is a British food writer and chef, best known for his television appearances.

== Early life ==
Phang was born in London. His father was from China and his mother from Guyana. He began his career as a fashion agent, working with models such as Naomi Campbell, Tyra Banks and Liv Tyler.

== Marchioness tragedy ==
In 1989, Phang arranged a friend's birthday party on board a pleasure boat on the River Thames, which ended in disaster and the death of many of his friends after the boat was struck by a larger vessel and sank. Phang himself was briefly under water and survived by clinging to a beer barrel. In 2009, he made a documentary about the event for the BBC, called The Marchioness: A Survivor’s Story.

== Media career ==
Phang was a judge on Britain's Next Top Model, which received the RADAR Media Award for Best Factual Programming. He wrote the cookbooks The Pepperpot Club: A Celebration of Caribbean Cuisine and Jonathan Phang's Caribbean Cookbook. He has been featured on Food Network and SBS Food, and in Good Housekeeping, the Daily Express, The Straits Times, The New Paper, Travel Weekly, and Radio Diva. He hosted the show Gourmet Trains. In 2015, he was a presenter at the Wing Travel Awards ceremony.

== Personal life ==
In the November 2018 issue of Gay Times, Phang was featured as part of their cover, in collaboration with Gaysians. In an interview with the magazine, Phang spoke of his difficulties in coming out and realising he was gay "at about eight years old."
