= Black people in Ireland =

Racial and multi-ethnic group

Total population
- Republic of Ireland; 76,245, 1.5% (2022 census); Northern Ireland; 11,032, 0.58% (2021 census)

Regions with significant populations
- Limerick • Cork • Belfast • Kinsale • Waterford • Dublin

Languages
- Hiberno-English, Irish, African languages

Black people in Ireland, also known as Black Irish, Black and Irish or in Irish: Daoine Gorma/Daoine Dubha, are a multi-ethnic group of Irish people of African descent. Black people, Africans and people of African descent have lived in Ireland in small numbers since the 18th century. Throughout the 18th century they were mainly concentrated in the major cities and towns, especially in the Limerick, Cork, Belfast, Kinsale, Waterford, and Dublin areas.

Increases in immigration have led to the growth of the community across Ireland. According to the 2022 Census of Population, 67,546 people identify as Black or Black Irish with an African background, whereas 8,699 people identify as Black or Black Irish with any other Black background.

== History ==
Among the earliest examples of a Black presence in Ireland is from the account given that around 860CE, during the medieval Viking period when Scandinavian Dublin had an active slave market, Black prisoners were rounded up in Morocco and subsequently sold in medieval Ireland.

During the 18th century it was common and even fashionable for middle-class Anglo-Irish families to take Black servants into their households as a sign of wealth and prestige. In particular, having a young Black servant attend an Anglo-Irish lady of the house was considered a sign of exceptional wealth and high position in society. One of the most well-known Black servants in Ireland during this time was Tony Small. During the American Revolutionary War (1775–1783), Small fled his owners from South Carolina, finding Lord Edward Fitzgerald in a near-death condition and assisting his recovery. Subsequently, Lord Edward returned to Ireland, where Tony Small became a dear friend to the family. Later, on a trip to London, Tony met his future wife, a French maid named Julia. The couple later had three children, Moirico, Harriet Pamela and Edward, moved to London and established a business.

Many were independent domestic workers, travelling musicians, artists, soldiers and tradesmen. Others were servants who received a salary and were considered free people. A small number of formerly enslaved Black Americans relocated to Ireland. In addition to Tony Small, the preacher John Jea and the scholar William G. Allen both resided in Ireland for several years before all three relocated to England.

Some Black people who settled in Ireland assimilated into the wider Irish population, including entering into mixed marriages and having children with white Irish people. 'Mulatto Jack' was also a child of interracial marriage. Abducted from Ireland in the early 18th century, he was subsequently sold as a slave in Antigua. After helping plot a slave rebellion, he was discovered by the colonists, and his release was negotiated for several months until agreed upon provided his instant deportation back to Ireland. The Black singer Rachael Baptist, also known as Rachael Crow, lived and worked throughout Ireland in the mid-18th century, as well as spending 10 years in England. One estimate suggests that, over the course of the 18th century, the total number of Black people in Ireland may have been between 2,000 and 3,000, though not all present at the same time. Dublin in particular is thought to have had, after London, the largest Black population of any city in the British Isles, and possibly any European city outside London.

Former slaves who visited or toured Ireland included Olaudah Equiano and Frederick Douglass.

Afro-Caribbean people descended from Irish Caribbean people, especially those on Barbados, Jamaica, and Montserrat, often have Irish surnames, speak a form of Caribbean English influenced by the Irish vernacular and, in some cases, sing Irish songs.

== Since Partition ==
=== Republic of Ireland ===
==== Mid-20th Century ====
In the mid-20th century, the Irish government ran schemes aimed at attracting students from African nations, with the aim of providing them with skills that would be useful in the growth of newly independent countries. In 1962, there were 1,100 African students in Ireland, comprising roughly a tenth of the student population. Many of these schemes were facilitated using links between Irish missionary organizations. This also included military training, with a military college taking on a delegation of Zambian cadets in 1967, citing Ireland's lack of a history of imperialism. Their stay was mostly temporary since many returned to their countries after graduating and gaining sufficient skills to prosper back home. However, throughout the 1960s until roughly the 1990s, the African population in Ireland, although remaining relatively small, consisted not only of students but of visitors and professionals, such as doctors.

Examples of Black African students in Ireland during this period include Jaja Wachuku, who studied at Trinity College Dublin in the 1940s and would later become a prominent statesman in his native Nigeria.

==== Celtic Tiger era ====
The increase of Ireland's non-white population started with the Irish boom of 1997 to 2009 is due in part to the laws which had governed Irish citizenship since the creation of the Republic of Ireland in 1937. These laws, which granted citizenship jus soli, were, for a period, interpreted by the Department of Justice as allowing parents who were not Irish citizens to remain in the state based on the rights of their Irish-born citizen children. In 2001 the government under Taoiseach Bertie Ahern sent Tánaiste Mary Harney on a world trip to invite people to come to Ireland. Harney visited 5 countries in Africa, including Nigeria and South Africa which eventually saw many people migrating to Ireland. This automatic granting of residency ceased in 2007, following a decision of the Supreme Court. As Ireland is Anglophone, and the large amount of immigration between the United Kingdom and the Republic, the vast majority of Black people in Ireland are immigrants (or their descendants) from Commonwealth countries in the Caribbean and Africa. The Twenty-seventh Amendment of the Constitution of Ireland changed the qualifications for Irish citizenship in 2004.

The 2006 Irish census recorded 40,525 people of Black African ethnicity and 3,793 people of any other Black background resident in the Republic out of a total population of 4,172,013, meaning that 1.06 percent of the population self-identified as Black. The preliminary results of the 2011 census recorded 58,697 people of Black African ethnicity and 6,381 people of any other Black background resident in the Republic out of a total population of 4,525,281, meaning that 1.42 per cent of the population self-identified as Black.

The Celtic Tiger boom of 1992–2007 also increased immigration into Ireland from all parts of the world, including Africa, and this led to delays in processing applications at the Garda National Immigration Bureau. For non-EU persons, this led to restrictive laws and hundreds of deportations annually of those not qualifying for asylum or admission. Some failed asylum cases received considerable media attention, such as that of Pamela Izevbekhai, who claimed that her daughters were likely to be subjected to female genital mutilation following deportation, and that another daughter had died from the same procedure in 1994. Despite presenting her case to the Seanad in 2008 and as far as the Supreme Court of Ireland and European Court of Human Rights, the court found in 2011 that her use of forged documents was "inadequate".

Individual areas have been noted as having larger groups of people descended from Sub-Saharan Africa than most of the country. The town of Gort, County Galway, is home to a large Brazilian population, including Black and mixed-race individuals.

==== 2010s and present ====
Following the European migrant crisis of 2015, refugees from conflict zones in North, East and Central Africa, such as Eritrea, Sudan, Somalia, the Congo, and Burundi have settled in Ireland.

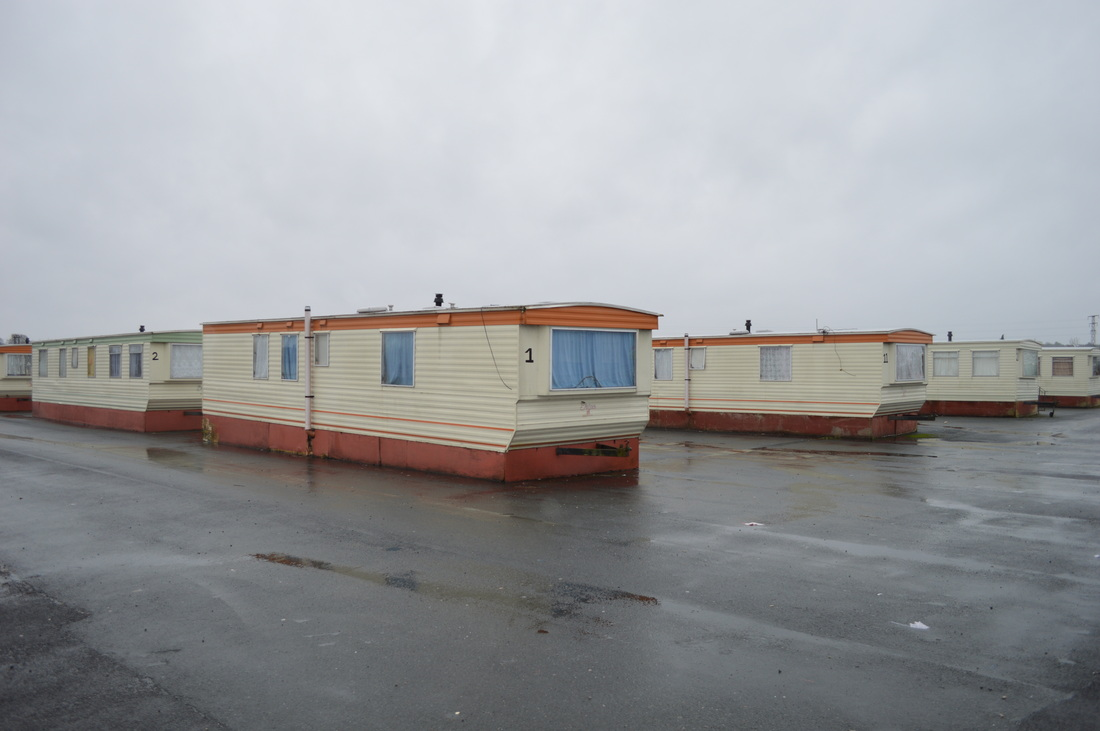
A direct provision centre in Athlone, Republic of Ireland

There are a number of challenges noted by Ireland's Black people, including casual racism, persistence of stereotypes, and inequal treatment in education.

Many refugees from African countries reside in Ireland's direct provision system, an intake system for asylum seekers that has been frequently condemned for its drawn-out processing timelines and poor quality of life.

=== Northern Ireland ===
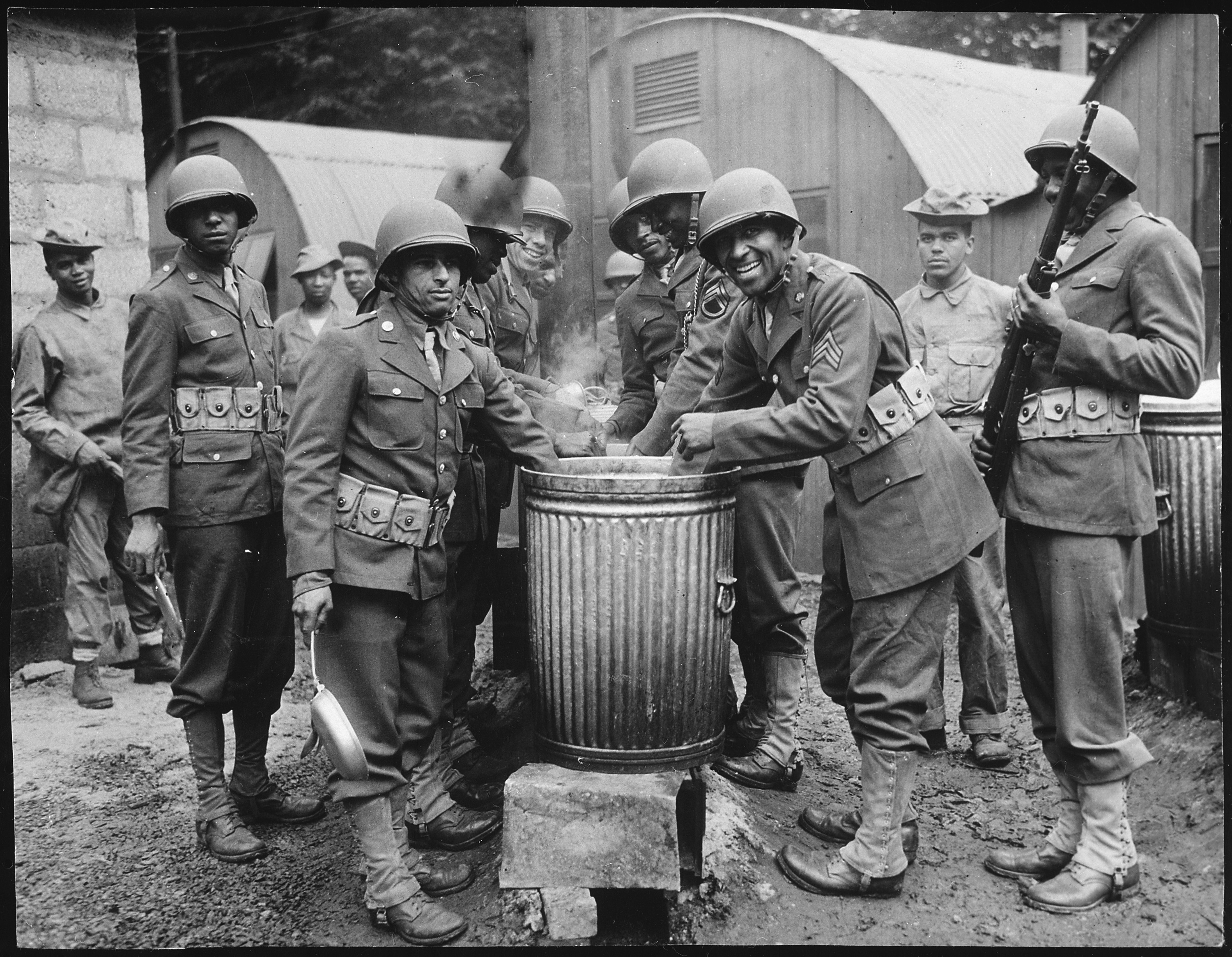
African American soldiers in Northern Ireland in 1942.

==== World War II ====
A number of African American soldiers were stationed in Northern Ireland as part of American involvement in World War II. The reaction of those in Northern Ireland was 'largely color-blind', with acceptance generally offered from both Catholic and Protestant communities, who viewed the visiting soldiers primarily as American. The Stormont government refused to enact segregation laws at the behest of the American military, though there were instances of unofficial segregation and racism, largely drawn from ignorance. It is suggested that there was, however, differing treatment of white American and black American troops by the Northern Irish population, especially in the later years of the war. The lack of a color bar, by and large, in treatment in Northern Ireland led to feelings that equality was attainable at home as it was abroad. Many women who involved themselves in relationships with American soldiers, black or white, risked ostracism by their community. Much media coverage of black American troops relied heavily on stereotypes, even when coverage was largely positive. Despite the Stormont Government not keeping records of the births of mixed-race children, official and unofficial sources note the birth of several. The equal treatment between white and black soldiers was also noted as causing significant anger among the white soldiers.

==== The Troubles ====
A number of Black people from mainland Britain were stationed in Northern Ireland during The Troubles, as part of British Army deployments. A small number of the 3,000 victims of violence during The Troubles were Black, both British Army soldiers and civilians. Tim Brannigan, a Black mixed-race man convicted of storing weapons for the Provisional Irish Republican Army was held in the Maze Prison from 1990-1994.

==== Post-Good Friday Agreement ====
At the time of the 2001 United Kingdom census, of the total population of Northern Ireland (1,685,267), 255 people described their ethnicity as Black Caribbean, 494 as Black African and 387 as Other Black, meaning that the total Black population was 1,136. These figures do not include individuals who described themselves as being of mixed-race.

As well as help from the Equality Commission for Northern Ireland, the EU-funded Afro-Community Support Organisation Northern Ireland (ACSONI) was formed in 2003 to represent the views of Black people. ACSONI prepared a report in 2011 on other residents' perceptions and general knowledge of Africa and Africans.

=== Mother and Baby Homes ===
It was noted that approximately 275 mixed-race children were born and held in Mother and Baby Homes between 1922 and 1998. Pregnancies between white Irish and Black couples rarely resulted in marriage, with resulting children often taken into these institutions, leaving them with incomplete records of family history. Mixed-race children were subject to discrimination in these institutions, with fewer being offered for adoption at the same rate as white Irish babies. Many were sent to 'reject wards' for children deemed 'unadoptable' on the basis of their skin color. A report into the Mother and Baby Homes denied there was racial discrimination within these institutions.

A prominent example of racial discrimination against mixed-race children in Ireland and across Britain is the study conducted by anthropologists Rachel Fleming and Herbert Fleur in 1924. It investigated the physical appearances of Black Irish children and described their unique features in terms of race. They highlighted the "otherness" of these children by closely comparing their features to those of purely British children, suggesting they could never look or be the same. In 1930 Muriel Fletcher, a social scientist, produced a similar report, although focusing on the psychological aspects of mixed-race relationships and their children. Both investigations concluded that the physical and moral characteristics of mixed-race children are defective and will prevent them from integrating into society in the future.

During World War II, specifically from 1942 until 1945, a large number of Black American soldiers were stationed across the UK. Predominantly rural positions of their military bases often resulted in mixed-race relationships between white British and Irish women and Black American GIs. These relations rarely led to marriage, although frequently to pregnancies. Children of such alliances often ended up in Mother and Baby Homes, given up for adoption, although some remained in their mothers' families, despite being a product of war-time affairs. However, mixed-race babies were not only children of American GIs, but also of African students.

== Black Irish in politics ==
Ireland has never elected a Teachta Dála (TD) or Senator of African descent. Likewise, there has never been any Black cabinet member, or leader of a major government institution. Black people are underrepresented in Irish politics. A number of reasons are suggested for this lack of representation, including that people of African descent tend to be younger than the rest of the population, the PR-STV voting system failing to facilitate representation of minorities not clustered in a single geographic area, as well as the highly personalised nature of Irish politics being difficult for immigrants to make vital political connections.

In 2007, Nigerian refugee and politician Rotimi Adebari was elected as mayor of Portlaoise, the first Black mayor in Ireland. In 2011, Darren Scully resigned as mayor of Naas after stating he would refuse to represent "Black Africans" because of their "aggressiveness and bad manners".

In 2018, Black Irish artist Kevin Sharkey unsuccessfully sought nomination to contest the Presidential Election, failing to be nominated by either councils or the Oireachtas. Sharkey ran on an anti-immigration platform.

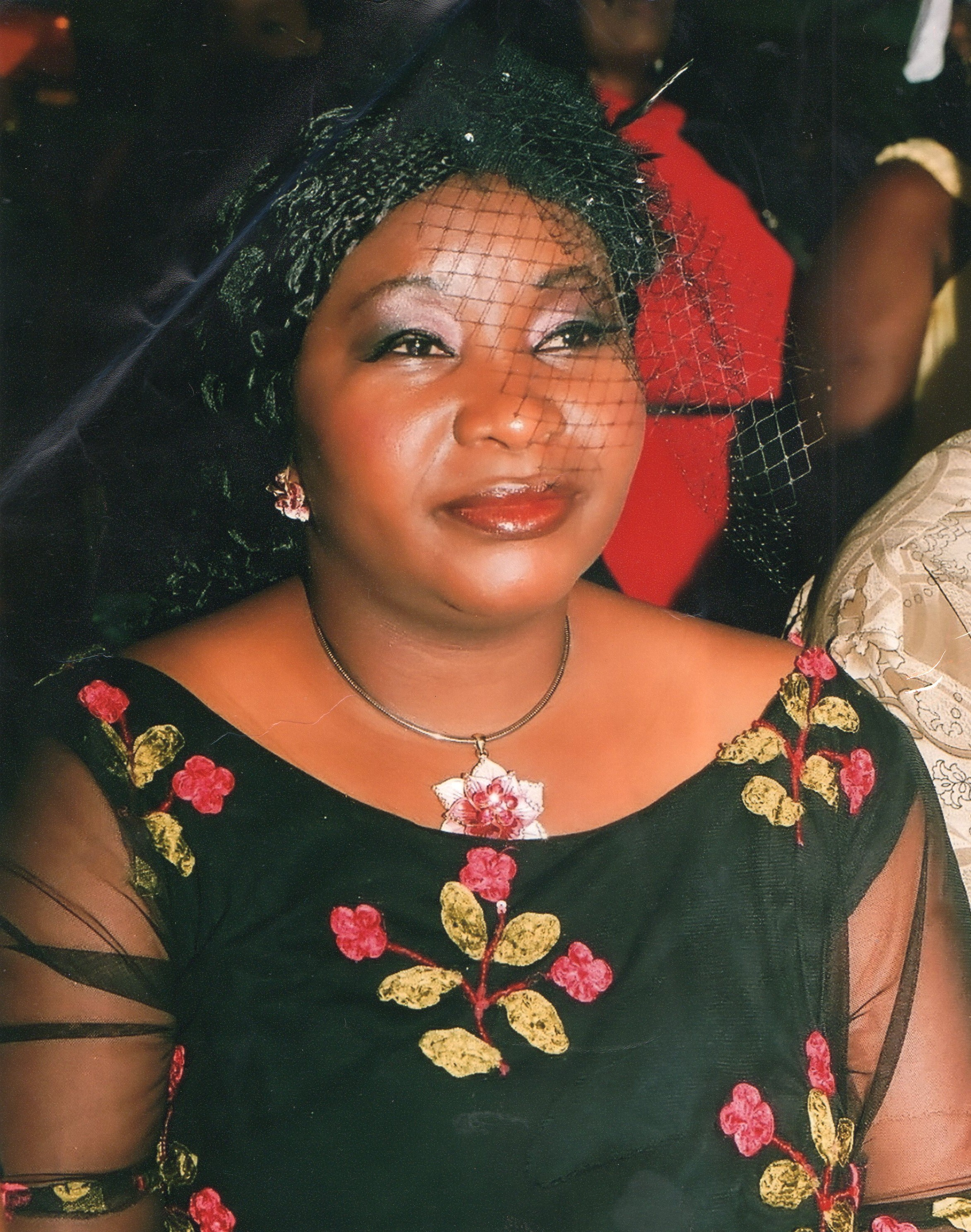
Yemi Adenuga, the first Black female councillor elected in Ireland

As of 2021, there were only two Black councillors out of 949 – Cllr. Uruemu Adejinmi, who represents Fianna Fáil on Longford County Council, and Cllr. Yemi Adenuga, a former Gogglebox Ireland star who represents Fine Gael on Meath County Council. Adenuga was the first Black female councillor elected in Ireland. In 2021, Adejinmi unsuccessfully sought the Fianna Fáil nomination for the 2021 Seanad By-Election. Former asylum seeker Ellie Kisyombe, originally from Malawi, ran for Dublin's North Inner City constituency with the Social Democrats during the 2019 Local Elections, becoming the first former asylum seeker to seek election in the Republic of Ireland. She failed to get elected, after discrepancies in her timeline for application for asylum emerged.

In June 2021, Lilian Seenoi-Barr, who is Maasai and originally from Kenya, was co-opted by the SDLP to the Derry and Strabane District Council, becoming Northern Ireland's first Black councillor. She subsequently retained her place on the council at the 2023 Northern Ireland local elections. In April 2024, she was selected as the next first citizen of Derry City and Strabane, making her Northern Ireland's first black mayor.

Following the 2024 Irish local elections, Uruemu Adejinmi and Yemi Adenuga were joined by Honore Kamegni and Helen Ogbu to bring the number of Black councillors to 4. Honore Kamegni of the Green Party was the first Black person ever to win a seat on the Cork City Council, while Helen Ogbu of the Labour Party made history by becoming the first Black person elected to the Galway City Council. Subsequently, Ogbu was selected as the Labour Party (Ireland) candidate for the 2026 Galway West by-election, coming third.

== Impacts on Irish culture and integration ==
=== Religion ===
Immigration from Africa has been noted as increasing the numbers of Protestant adherents in Ireland, contributing to the reversal in the decline of numbers. A number of Catholic priests are also noted as immigrating to Ireland from African nations, owing to the declining amount of priests in Irish parishes.

=== Poetry, written, and spoken work ===
The poem 'For Our Mothers', by Nigerian-Irish poet Felicia Olusanya (FeliSpeaks) is featured on the 2023 Leaving Certificate curriculum. Author Emma Dabiri is one of a number of Irish authors with African heritage.

In July 2021, the team from Maynooth University, consisting of Rí Anumudu and Chikemka Abuchi-Ogbonda, became the first Black Irish team to win the prestigious Irish Times Debating Competition.

=== Irish language ===
A number of Irish people of African descent are noted as being Gaeilgeoirí (speakers of the Irish language), such as broadcasters Zainab Boladale and Ola Majekodunmi.

=== Sport ===
Track and field athlete Israel Olatunde is a sprinter who has represented Ireland on numerous occasions. He holds the Irish record for the 60m and 100m sprints, and has been called "Ireland's fastest man".

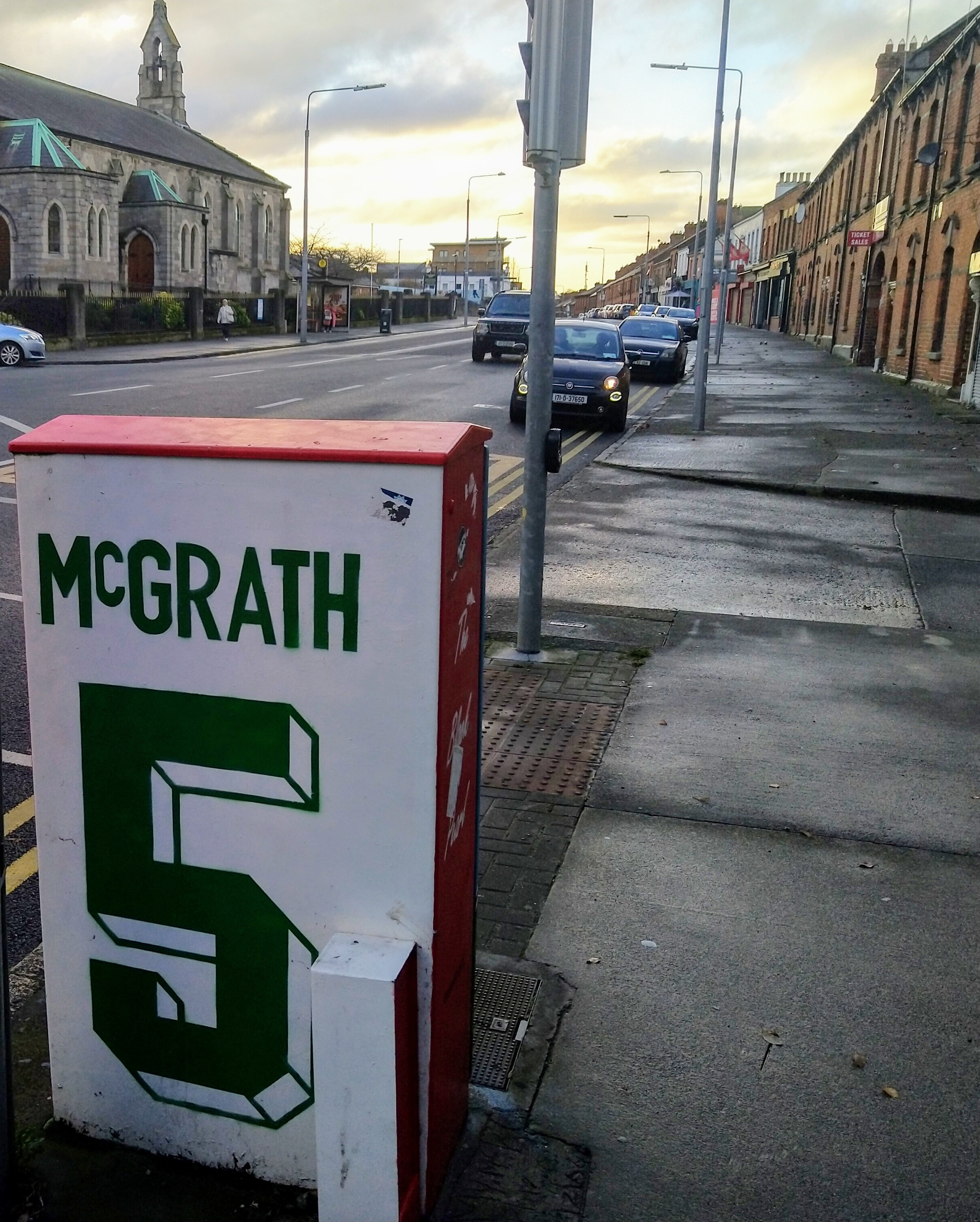
Street art dedicated to footballer Paul McGrath outside Richmond Park, home ground of his first club St Patrick's Athletic.

A number of players on Ireland's football team are of African descent.

== Notable people ==
=== Black people in Ireland ===
- James Abankwah, footballer
- Tayo Adaramola, footballer
- Rotimi Adebari, politician
- Val Adedokun, footballer
- Baba Adeeko, footballer
- Emmanuel Adegboyega, footballer
- Rhasidat Adeleke, athlete
- Yemi Adenuga, politician
- Jonathan Afolabi, footballer
- Edwin Agbaje, footballer
- Ifrah Ahmed, social activist
- Bori Akinola, athlete
- Millenic Alli, footballer
- Kwame Ampadu, former footballer
- Mayowa Animasahun, footballer
- Sinclair Armstrong, footballer
- Gbemi Arubi, footballer
- Leon Ayinde, footballer
- Noe Baba, footballer
- Taiwo Badmus, basketball player
- Robert Baloucoune, Irish rugby union player
- Zishim Bawa, footballer
- Gavin Bazunu, footballer
- Leon Best, former footballer
- Christine Buckley, activist
- Yasmine Byrne, known professionally as Jazzy, singer-songwriter and producer
- Jake Carroll, former footballer
- Denise Chaila, rapper, singer, poet, grime and hip-hop artist
- Cyrus Christie, footballer
- Erica Cody, R&B singer-songwriter
- Barry Cotter, footballer
- Ultan Dillane, rugby player
- Ricardo Dinanga, footballer
- Festy Ebosele, footballer
- Aidomo Emakhu, footballer
- Lucia Evans, singer
- Shamir Fenelon, footballer
- Curtis Fleming, former footballer
- Caleb Folan, former footballer
- Kwaku Fortune, actor
- Garnett sisters, Irish singer-songwriters of Sierra Leonean descent
- Liam George, former footballer
- Chris Hughton, former footballer
- Cian Hughton, former footballer
- Henry Hughton, former footballer
- Marsha Hunt, actress, singer, and writer
- Adam Idah, professional footballer
- Kamal Ibrahim, television presenter and actor
- Roland Idowu, footballer
- Laura Izibor, recording artist
- Ebun Joseph, academic
- Jafaris, rapper, singer-songwriter
- Dare Kareem, footballer
- Joshua Kayode, footballer
- Ray Keogh, former footballer
- Peter Kioso, footballer
- Trent Koné-Doherty, footballer
- Bosun Lawal, footballer
- Francely Lomboto, footballer
- Pico Lopes, footballer
- Josh Magennis, footballer
- Kasey McAteer, footballer
- David McGoldrick, footballer
- Paul McGrath, former footballer
- Caden McLoughlin, footballer
- Clinton Morrison, former footballer
- Jake Mulraney, footballer
- Omero Mumba, actor and singer
- Samantha Mumba, actor and singer
- Corrie Ndaba, footballer
- Ruth Negga, actress
- Glory Nzingo, footballer
- Michael Obafemi, footballer
- Joe O'Cearuill, former footballer
- Mipo Odubeko, footballer
- David Odumosu, footballer
- Offica, rapper
- Chiedozie Ogbene, footballer
- Shadrach Ogie, footballer
- Mazeed Ogungbo, footballer
- David Okagbue, footballer
- Armstrong Oko-Flex, footballer
- Thomas Oluwa, footballer
- Andrew Omobamidele, footballer
- Promise Omochere, footballer
- Ike Orazi, footballer
- Cassia O'Reilly, singer-songwriter and music producer
- Emmanuel Osadebe, footballer
- Paul Osam, former footballer
- Owen Oseni, footballer
- Gabriel Otegbayo, footballer
- Victor Ozhianvuna, footballer
- John Patrick, footballer
- Terry Phelan, former footballer
- Darren Randolph, former footballer
- Callum Robinson, footballer
- Kevin Sharkey, artist, political activist, and former television presenter
- Olamide Shodipo, footballer
- Christopher Simpson, actor of Irish-Greek-Rwandan descent
- Rejjie Snow, rapper
- Tunmise Sobowale, footballer
- Ade Solanke, footballer
- Soulé, pop singer-songwriter
- Fuad Sule, footballer
- Darren Sutherland, former boxer
- Adrien Thibaut, footballer
- Pamela Uba, scientist, model and Miss Ireland 2021
- Franco Umeh, footballer
- Jaden Umeh, footballer
- Wilson Waweru, footballer
- Derrick Williams, former footballer
- Tyreik Wright, footballer
- Simon Zebo, rugby union player

=== Black Irish emigrants ===
==== Emigrants to France ====
- Kwame Ampadu, former footballer

==== Emigrants to Great Britain ====
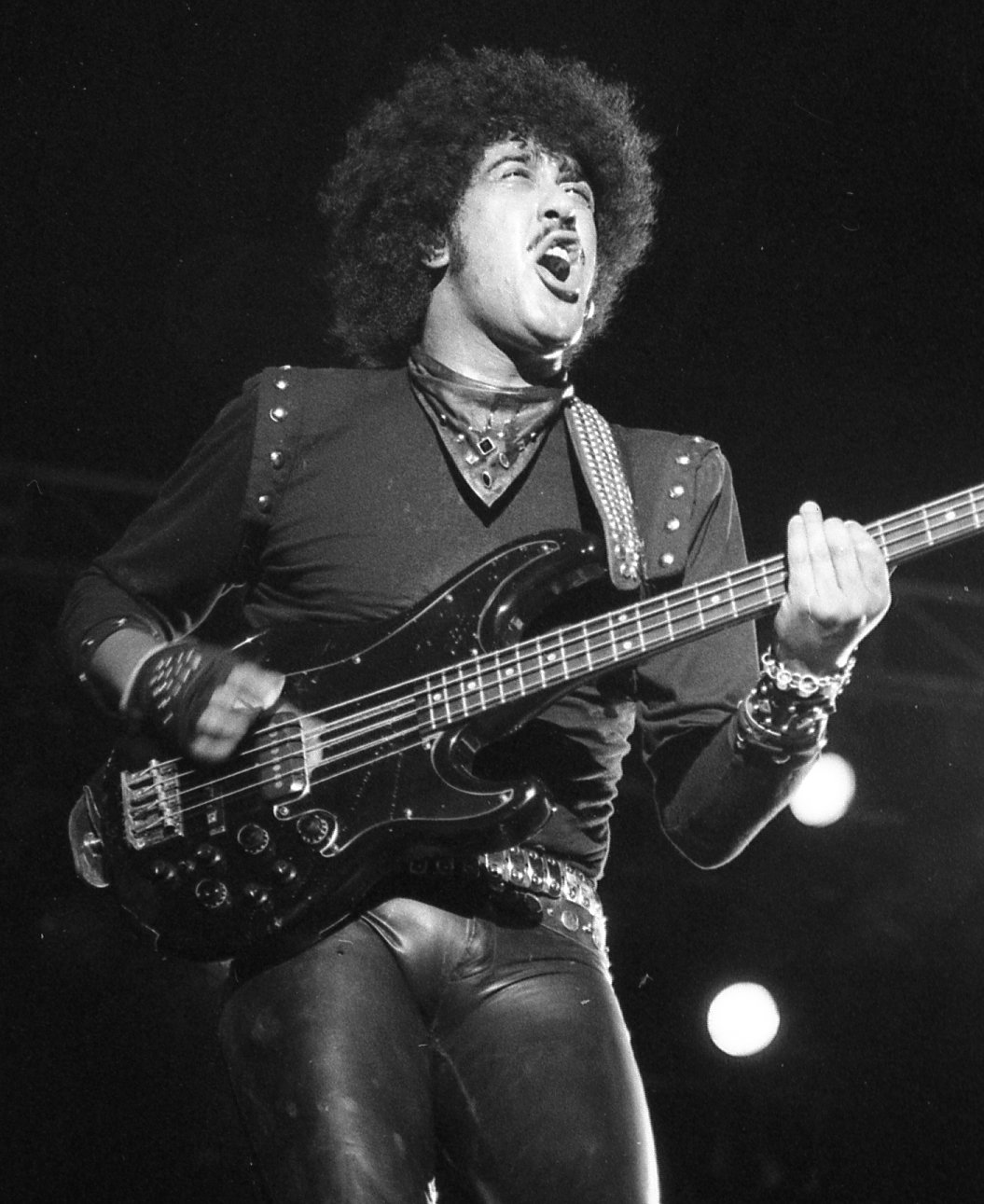
When once asked what it was like to be Black and Irish, the musician Phil Lynott is reputed to have responded "It’s a bit like being a pint of Guinness".

- Emma Dabiri, author, academic, and broadcaster
- Layla Flaherty, actress and model
- Rianna Jarrett, footballer
- Phil Lynott, rock singer, bassist and lead vocalist of Thin Lizzy
- Cassia O'Reilly, singer-songwriter
- Darren Randolph, footballer
- Christopher Simpson, actor

==== Emigrants to United States ====
- Samantha Mumba, pop singer
- Ruth Negga, actor
- Fionnghuala O'Reilly, represented Ireland at the Miss Universe 2019 pageant
- Emma Dabiri, academic
