= Chay Bowes =

Irish broadcaster

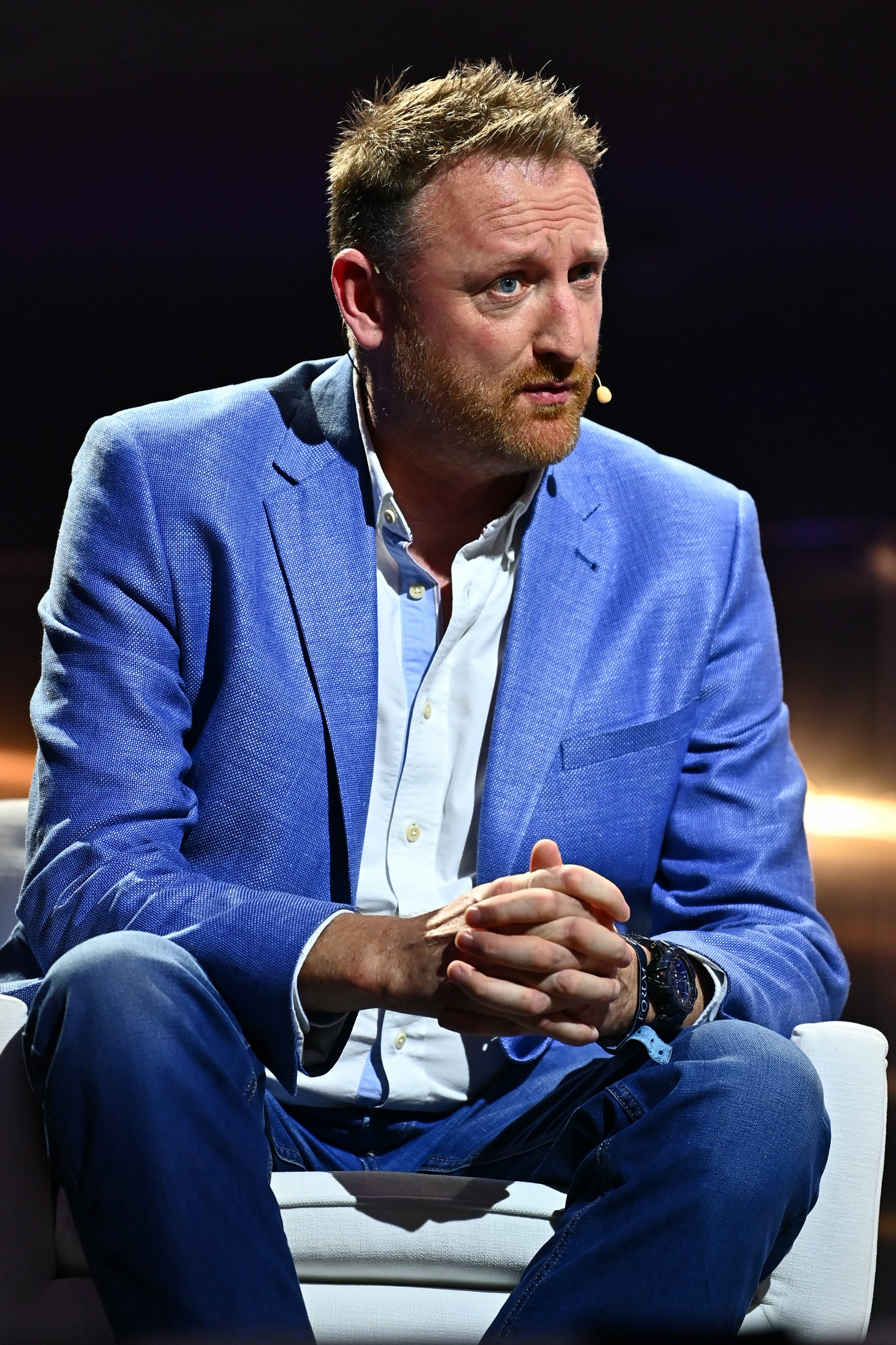
- Bowes in 2021
- Born: 1971; Dublin, Ireland
- Education: Master's degree in strategic studies
- Years active: 2021–present
- Employer: Russia Today
- Known for: Co-founder of The Ditch
- Spouse: Olga Bowes

Chay Bowes (born 1971) is an Irish businessman and internet personality. He was a founder of two medical companies and a co-founder of The Ditch news and investigative website. Currently Bowes lives in Russia and works for Russian state media outlet RT.

In 2023, he addressed the UN Security Council at Russia's invitation, describing the Russo-Ukrainian war as a proxy war supported by NATO, and warning against the "frenzied, incalculable, loosely regulated" supply of weapons to Ukraine. In 2026, he was sanctioned by the European Union, which accused him of being a pro-Russian propagandist spreading disinformation to legitimise Russia's war against Ukraine.

== Career ==
After completing school, Bowes joined the Irish Army medical corps in 1988. In 1993, he was a phlebotimist in St. James's Hospital and following this, he set up a mobile phlebotomy service. This company expanded its services to include other procedures, such as vaccinations, and provided services to the HSE.

Around 2004, Bowes founded Tara Healthcare with Dr. Gerry McElvaney. This company was an early provider of home treatments for complex illness in Ireland and won valuable state contracts. The HSE was criticised for using Tara Healthcare for providing services that were already available in the public system at a lower cost. Tara Healthcare was subsequently acquired by Vhi Healthcare. Bowes went on to become head of the VHI homecare division before selling his stake and leaving in 2011. Bowes owned and ran several other business in the following number of years including an outdoor store chain, which also sold firearms, and a company providing tours themed around the Easter Rising.

Around 2017, Bowes founded Community Hospital Ireland with Neil Pope. While promoting the business, he made contact with Maitiú Ó Tuathail, then president of the National Association of General Practitioners (NAGP). The project ran into what Bowes viewed as political opposition. While acting as chief executive of the NAGP, Bowes leaked information to Village magazine, showing Leo Varadkar had provided a copy of a confidential document on GP contracts to Ó Tuathail. Village Magazine magazine published the story in 2020.

In April 2021, Bowes co-created the Irish political news website The Ditch, alongside journalists Eoghan McNeill and Roman Shortall and his personal friend, businessman Paddy Cosgrave.

Bowes resigned his directorship at The Ditch in June 2022. He described allegations that the Russian government was involved in the website as "utterly baseless conspiracy theories".

== Connections to Russia ==
In 2020, right-wing media outlet Gript published an article linking Bowes to an anonymous Twitter account that had expressed views supportive of Vladimir Putin, urged Russia to slaughter Ukrainians, and made homophobic comments. In 2021, Bowes initiated a lawsuit against Gript writers John McGuirk and Gary Kavanagh over the article.

Bowes has lived in Russia since 2022, when it invaded Ukraine. Bowes addressed the UN Security Council, at Russia's invitation, on 29 June 2023. He was introduced as a "scholar specialising in small arms and munitions". He described the Russo-Ukrainian war as a proxy war supported by NATO and warned against the "frenzied, incalculable, loosely regulated" supply of weapons to Ukraine. Russia's ambassador defended Bowes as a "famous journalist" who was "not afraid to tell the truth", while Ukraine's ambassador dismissed him as a "Russian stooge". His UN appearance was part of Russia's effort to shift blame for the war onto the West.

Bowes works for the Russian state media network Russia Today, RT. He has hosted an RT show called Moscow Mules since February 2024, and co-founded a pro-Russian network called The Islander News. He describes the West as the aggressor in the Russo-Ukrainian war, and has been accused of spreading Kremlin-sponsored, anti-Ukrainian and anti-Western disinformation about the war. An Irish Times article from May 2025 described Bowes as a supporter of Russia in the war and of Vladimir Putin's foreign policy. He has also criticised the Irish government for helping Ukrainian war refugees.

In November 2026, Bowes was among 113 people and entities sanctioned by the EU in connection with Russia's war against Ukraine. It accused him of being a pro-Russian propagandist, involved in "information manipulation and dissemination of narratives that legitimise and sustain the ongoing Russia's war of aggression against Ukraine". It stated that "Bowes is involved in numerous information operations conducted by the Foundation to Battle Injustice (R-FBI), which was created by the Wagner Group" and said he often promoted content by the Russian state-backed disinformation group Storm-1516. According to the Irish Examiner, Bowes was associated with the Moscow-based Social Design Agency (SDA).

The sanctions freeze any assets he holds in the EU, but does not prevent him from returning to the Republic of Ireland.

Bowes replied in a social media post that "the authoritarian EU sanctioned me, no recourse to defend myself, no hearing, no evidence ... They want to bully me into silence". People Before Profit leader Richard Boyd Barrett called the sanction "A sinister move seriously threatening free speech and press".

== 2025 Romanian presidential election ==
Bowes was detained on 1 May 2025, on his arrival at Bucharest airport on his way to Romania, to cover the presidential election. He was prevented from entering under a law that prevents foreign interference in Romanian politics. He was provided with information how to challenge the charges, but decided to book a flight to Turkey instead.

== Personal life ==
Bowes is married to Olga, who the Irish Times have described as "ethnically Russian".
