= The Ditch (website) =

Irish political news website

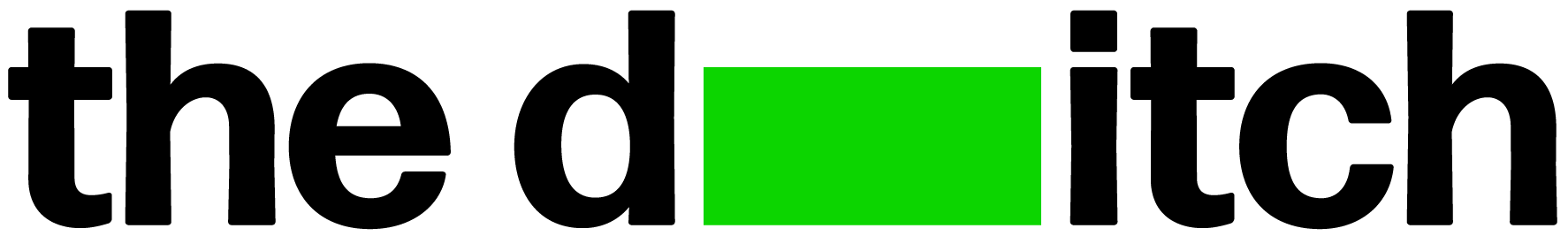
- Type: Online newspaper
- Founders: Paddy Cosgrave; Eoghan McNeill; Roman Shortall; Chay Bowes
- Editor: Eoghan McNeill
- Founded: 3 April 2021; 5 years ago
- Headquarters: 71 Lower Baggot Street, Dublin 2 (PO box)
- Website: OnTheDitch.com

The Ditch is an Irish political news website established by journalists Eoghan McNeill and Roman Shortall, and businessmen Chay Bowes and Paddy Cosgrave in April 2021. The website has focused on investigative journalism and investigations into politicians and since its creation has broken news stories in Ireland relating to politicians which have resulted in two Ministers of State resigning from office.

== Origins and founders ==
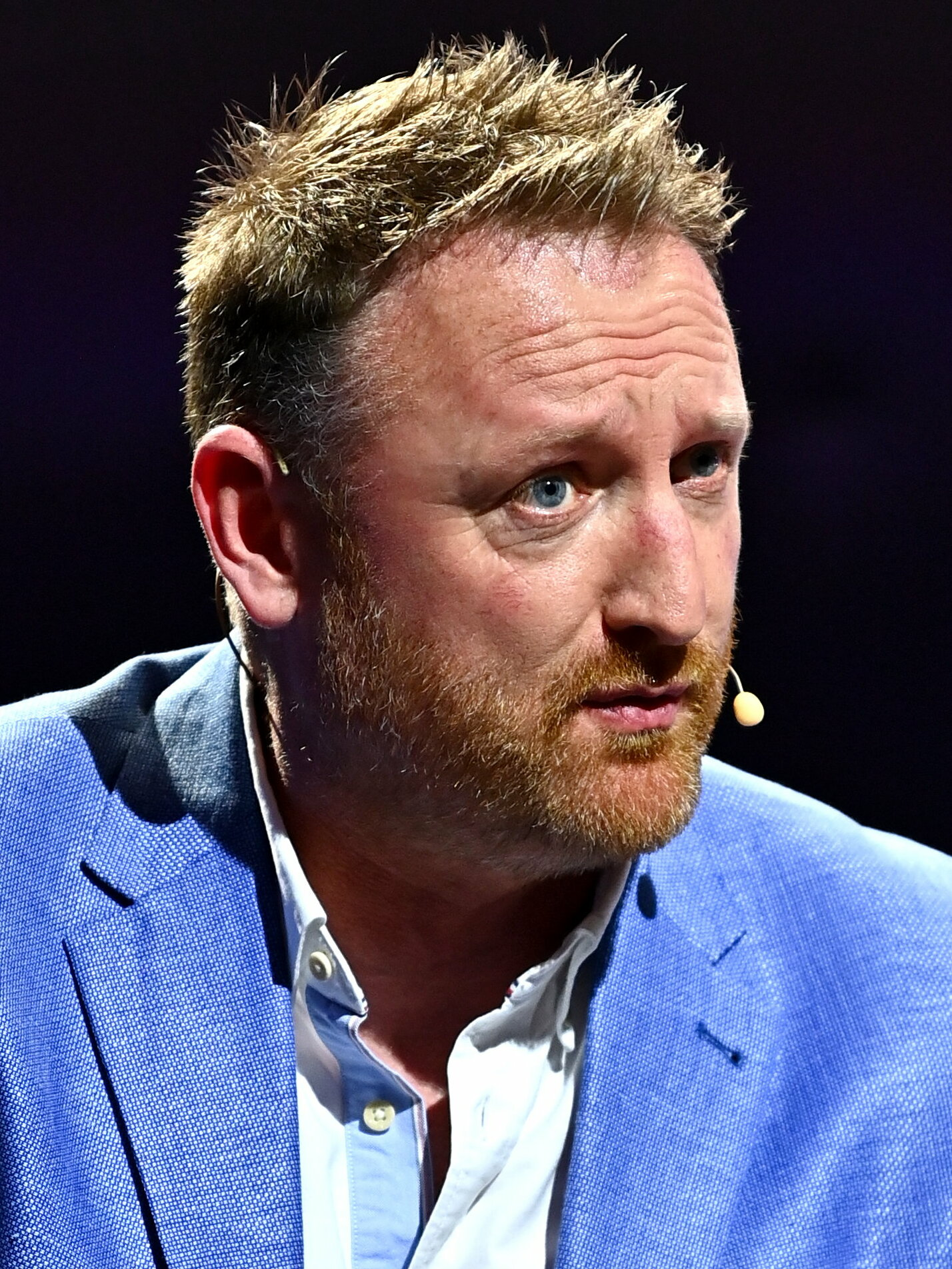
Chay Bowes

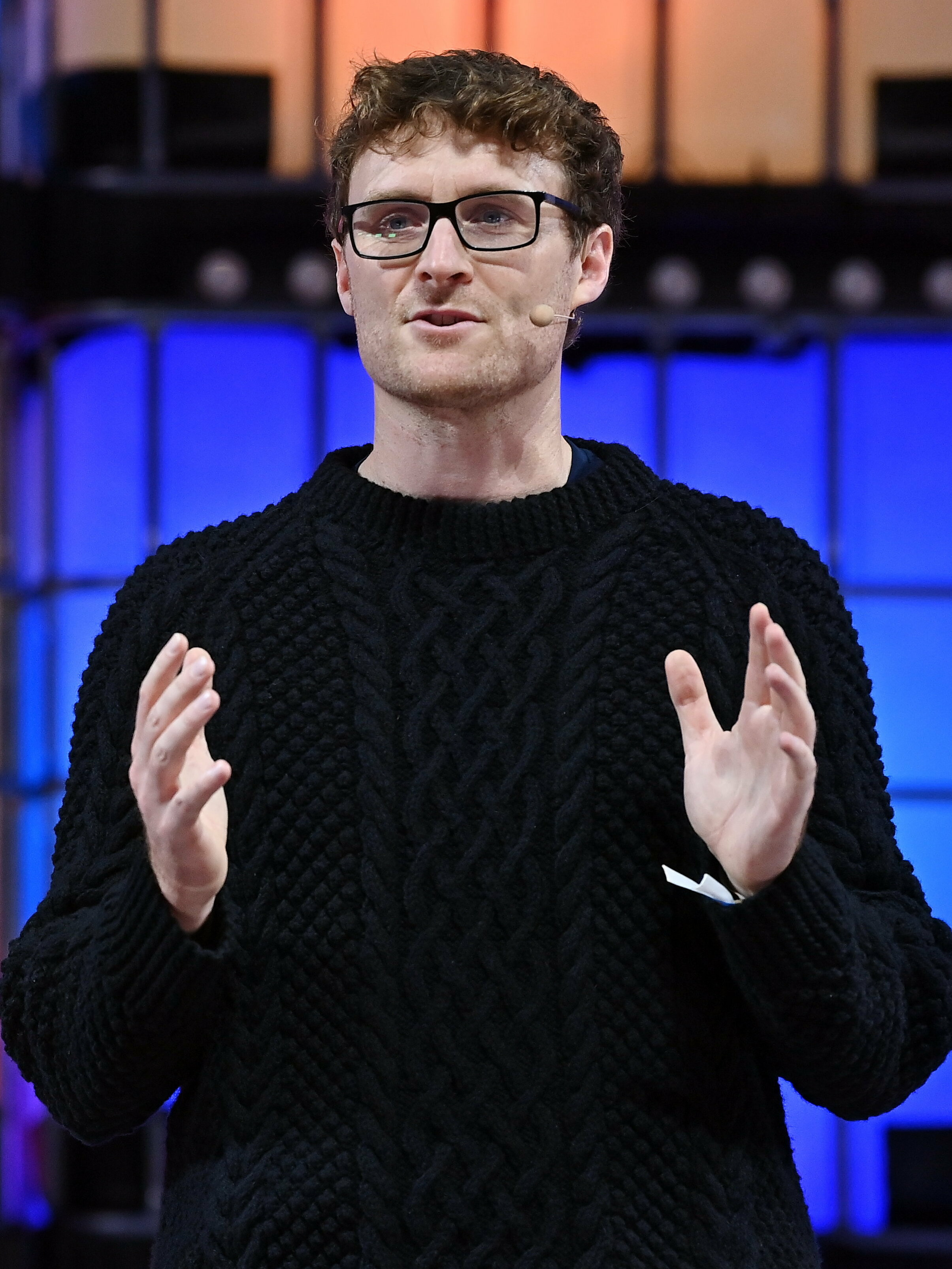
Paddy Cosgrave

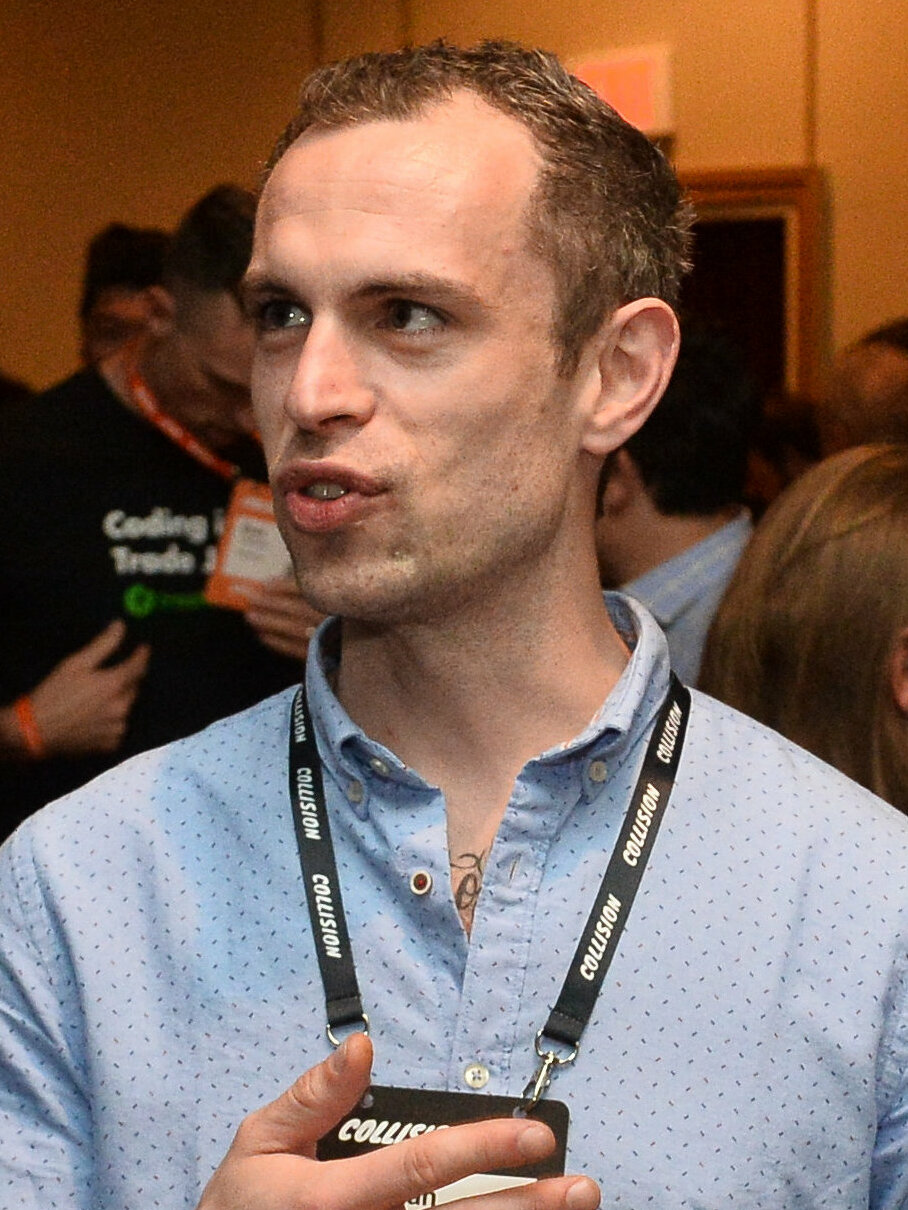
Eoghan McNeill

The Ditch was founded by Paddy Cosgrave, Roman Shortall, Chay Bowes and Eoghan McNeill. Paddy Cosgrave was the primary financial backer of the Ditch via his Web Summit organisation. Cosgrave is the organiser behind the Web Summit conferences, which in the early 2010s were hosted annually in Dublin. However, in 2016 Cosgrave pulled Web Summit from Dublin and moved it to Lisbon, Portugal following an argument with the sitting Fine Gael government over a number of issues including grants. Since that dispute, Cosgrave has been described as holding a "grudge" against Fine Gael which has motivated him to support the company. The Ditch states that Cosgrave had no editorial influence over the publication.

Eoghan McNeill is a journalist who had formerly worked for the Irish Independent, China Daily, and the Cork News. He had also worked for Cosgrave's Web Summit in the past.

Chay Bowes, was a founding member of the Ditch. Bowes had previously been involved in supplying information about Leo Varadkar providing a copy of a confidential document on GP contracts to Maitiú Ó Tuathail, president of the National Association of General Practitioners, in a story which was broken by Village Magazine. Bowes resigned his directorship at the Ditch in June 2022.

=== Reception ===
In October 2022, The Phoenix opined that it remained sceptical about the supposed non-influence of Cosgrave over the editorial direction of the website. It also remarked that for a website created by people with a background in technology, the website was formatted like it had been "designed by a transition-year student".

In a January 2023 podcast, Hugh Linehan and Pat Leahy of The Irish Times stated they welcomed the arrival of The Ditch into the Irish news and media scene, stating they believed that the more scrutiny applied to public figures and politicians in Ireland, they better governance it would produce, regardless of if it was a new or old media source producing that scrutiny.

==== The Ditch discussed in Dáil Éireann ====
On 27 April 2023, the Ditch was discussed during a session of Dáil Éireann. Taoiseach Leo Varadkar questioned the neutrality of the Ditch while Tánaiste Micheál Martin said the Ditch was a "political organisation" that is biased against the governing coalition (Fine Gael, Fianna Fáil and the Green Party). Both Varadkar and Martin said that former Ditch member Chay Bowes had links to Russian media such as Russia Today, and cited tweets from Paddy Cosgrave linking him to the Ditch. Paul Murphy of People before Profit supported the Ditch and said that Robert Troy would not have lost his position as Minister of State had it not been for the Ditch's investigation. On the same day, the Ditch issued a statement that the allegations made by Varadkar and Martin were baseless and stating that the organisation is funded by subscribers to the website and by Paddy Cosgrave's Web Summit organisation. The following day, on 28 April, the National Union of Journalists criticised Martin's remarks regarding the Ditch, and the use of Parliamentary privilege to make those remarks.

=== Ownership and revenue ===
The Ditch was originally owned by Roman Shortall, Chay Bowes, and Eoghan McNeill, who each had a third of the company. Adam Connon, general counsel for Cosgrave's Web Summit, is one of three shareholders in the organisation as of April 2023, the other two being McNeill and Shortall.

The site says it relies upon a voluntary subscription service and donations for income, as well as contributions from the Web Summit organisation. On 30 April 2023, the Ditch stated it will receive €1,000,000 over five years from Web Summit.

Paddy Cosgrave was the primary financial backer of the Ditch, although he has no shareholding or directorship in the company. The Ditch stated Cosgrave had no editorial influence over the publication.

==== Web Summit pulls funding ====
Following comments on social media about the Gaza war by Paddy Cosgrave, Cosgrave was forced to resign as CEO of Web Summit on 21 October. On 7 November the remaining board members at the Web Summit pulled all promised funding from the Web Submit for the Ditch.

== Key Investigations ==
=== An Bord Pleanála ===
The publication's first piece to gain traction was a story about discrepancies and undeclared conflicts of interest at An Bord Pleanála which resulted in the resignation of chairperson Paul Hyde. The publication followed up their initial articles by publishing an internal ABP report about "matters of concern" within the planning body in February 2023.

=== Robert Troy ===
In August 2022 the Ditch broke the story that government minister of state Robert Troy had failed to declare a number of property interests. On 24 August, Troy resigned as a Minister of State, insisting he had made genuine errors with his statutory declaration while saying he would not apologise for being a landlord.

=== Damien English ===
In January 2023, the Ditch published a story accusing minister of state Damien English of failing to declare ownership of an existing home in his planning application for a new property in 2008. It also alleged he neglected to declare such ownership in the Dáil register of interests. English resigned as Minister of State on 12 January 2023.

=== Paschal Donohoe ===
In January 2023, allegations that Paschal Donohoe, Minister for Public Expenditure and President of the Eurogroup, had failed to declare donation of services in his 2016 election campaign were launched by the Irish Examiner and Irish Independent. The minister later admitted to discrepancies in his 2020 campaign. The Ditch published several articles about the politician during the following weeks regarding his meetings with the donor Michael Stone, the donor's position on state regeneration boards, and the Minister twice failing to declare directorship of a company.

== See also ==
- Corruption in the Republic of Ireland
- Irish political scandals
