= Coláiste Íosagáin, Booterstown =

School in Dublin, Ireland

Coláiste Íosagáin

Location
- Booterstown, County Dublin; Ireland; 53.30282°N 6.204277°W

Information
- Motto: Mol an óige agus tiocfaidh sí
- Established: 1971
- Principal: Treasa Ní Fhearraigh
- Gender: Female
- Enrollment: 500
- Colours: Black and Yellow
- Religious order: Edmund Rice Schools Trust
- Website: iosagain.eoiniosagain.ie

Coláiste Íosagáin is a Catholic girls Gaelcholáiste (Irish language secondary school) in Dublin, Ireland.

In 2008 and 2014, 100% of students went on to third level education. It was ranked first from 2017 to 2019 by The Irish Times Good Schools Guide.

== History ==
In 1968 the Christian Brothers allocated land from its land part of the St. Helen's period house for the building of two schools: a girls' school, Coláiste Íosagáin, was established in 1971 under the control of the Sisters of Mercy, and a boys' school, Coláiste Eoin, under the control of the Christian Brothers. The school occupied temporary premises at Carysfort College, Blackrock from 1971–1975 when it moved to the Stillorgan Road new building. In 1983, President Hillery opened the new Coláiste Íosagáin school. The School transferred to the patronage of the Christian Brothers in 2007 and under the Edmund Rice Trust in 2008. Coláiste Íosagáin is the only all-girls school under the trust.

== Sport ==
The school has Gaelic football, camogie, basketball, and athletics teams. Camogie teams traditionally compete at Under 16 and Under 18 at B-League levels within the province of Leinster. In 2011, the Ladies B Under 18 Gaelic football team won the Inter-Schools All-Ireland Cup.

== Extracurricular Activities ==
Coláiste Íosagáin offers a range of extracurricular activities that support its emphasis on Irish-language education and cultural engagement. The Coiste Gaeilge organizes activities promoting the Irish language and culture throughout the academic year, including Seachtain na Gaeilge celebrations, céilithe, quizzes, guest speaker sessions and the Cairde Gaeilge student mentoring programme. Music is also part of the school's extracurricular programme, with opportunities to participate in choirs, traditional music ensembles and the Coiste Ceoil, which organizes lunchtime performances and school events such as Picnic Leictreach. The school also operates several library-based clubs, including the Book Club, Film Club and Lego Club, which meet regularly during lunchtime and are open to junior and senior students. Student leadership opportunities include serving as cinnirí and participating in committees such as the Coiste Timpeallachta and Music Committee. These activities provide opportunities for students to develop leadership, teamwork, communication and social skills.

== New buildings ==
Early in the 1990s it was deemed that the school's existing single storey buildings, built in the 1970s, were too small to accommodate the expansion of both Coláiste Eoin and Íosagáin. It was decided that the school would require both a new classroom block and a sports hall/auditorium. The project, however, experienced difficulties from the outset due to a lack of funds. It took many years of collecting voluntary donations from parents and other members of the public for the project to even reach the planning stage. A second barrier was posed by the fact that additional accommodation could only be placed in a constricted rear area of the site, because the existing grass, Gaelic pitch to the south of this site was "sacrosanct". This restricted site condition caused the new building to be formed into two shared elements: a four storey academic block, and a sports hall with performance space. Despite these difficulties, building finally commenced in 2001, of a Grafton Architects-designed structure that met with all the schools requirements. The project was completed in 2003 and has since won an award at the Royal Institute of the Architects of Ireland Awards 2004. Work later commenced for a new building to be built on the far-side of Coláiste Íosagáin's main building, on a small side section of the school grass pitch in summer of 2013. The building consists of new classrooms, new changing rooms and chiefly, a school oratory. The building was completed in early December 2013 and is named 'Aireagal', because the main principle of the building is to provide an oratory for the students. This building completed the refurbishment of the school, and means that no more classes are held in prefabricated buildings.

== Notable past pupils ==
- Niamh Cusack – Actress known on TV for Heartbeat, A & E and on stage for The Curious Dog in the Night-time, Three Sisters, His Dark Materials
- Sinéad Goldrick – Dublin senior ladies' footballer
- Clíona Ní Bhuachalla – RTÉ presenter, helped set up Irish language soap 'Ros na Rún'. Established Icebox Films l
- Bláthnaid Ní Chofaigh – TV presenter, Echo Island, The Afternoon Show and Charity ICA Bootcamp 7rl
- Niamh Nic Mhathúna – Founding member of Youth Defence
- Síofra Cléirigh Büttner – runner
- Ola Majekodunmi – radio presenter
- Una Mullally – Irish journalist and broadcaster
- Críona Ní Dhálaigh – Former Lord Mayor Of Dublin
- Aimée Connolly- Founder of Sculpted by Aimée
- Marissa Carter- Founder of Coco Brown
