= New Resistance =

Nationalist organization in Brazil

- Nova Resistência
- Leader: Raphael Machado
- Founded: 2015; 11 years ago
- Country: Brazil
- Ideology: Neo-fascism; Traditionalism; Anti-Americanism; Anti-Bolsonarism; Fourth Political Theory; Anti-LGBT
- Political position: Far-right
- Website: novaresistencia.org

New Resistance (Brazilian Portuguese: Nova Resistência) is a Brazilian neofascist organization with an anti-liberal, anti-capitalist and traditionalist political orientation. It was founded in 2015 by Brazilian political activist Raphael Machado. The organization is considered pro-Russian and supportive of the views of Russian philosopher Aleksandr Dugin.

Nova Resistência has been described as part of a broader international movement, with affiliated groups or aligned organizations operating in several countries.

The organization has also been linked in reporting to the Russian disinformation campaign known as Storm-1516. According to investigations, the broader network associated with this campaign operates internationally, with some findings indicating connections to actors based in Brazil.

== Views ==
New Resistance rejects globalization in favor of a multipolar system, opposes the privatization of public companies, economic domination of the United States and the European Union, criticizes the LGBT movement, claims a political heritage from the nationalist-worker movement of Getúlio Vargas, and draws heavily on the thought of traditionalist Alexander Dugin, especially in the fourth political theory.

It opposes the governments of Brazil in the 2010s.

In economic policy, NR defends distributism, an economic theory inspired by Catholic social doctrine and disseminated by authors such as G. K. Chesterton and Hilaire Belloc. Its main idea is the defense of small private properties – which should belong to families – in opposition to concentrated ownership.

They are against certain "progressive" policies. Supporters often criticize, for example, the "LGBT lobby", groups such as Black Lives Matter, and gender ideology. They also condemn, however, some conservative social policies.

New Resistance initiated the 2023 Global Conference on Multipolarity, with speakers including Machado, Aleksandr Dugin, Maram Susli, Zhang Weiwei, Jan Carnogursky, Iurie Roșca, Matt Robson, Pepe Escobar and Vice-Minister of Culture of Venezuela Sergio Arria, as well as video messages from Russian Foreign Ministry Spokesperson Maria Zakharova and Russian Foreign Minister Sergei Lavrov.

== US Global Engagement Center ==
On October 19, 2023, the United States Department of State's Global Engagement Center issued a Special Report claiming that NR is a creation of the Russian government to promulgate disinformation in Brazil and that it held ties to Aleksandr Dugin's Eurasianist Movement. The report cited Nova Resistência hosting Russian "intellectuals" and "academics" who regularly offer "malign influence".

The report cited members of the group meeting with representatives from Belarus, North Korea, Syria, and Venezuela, who openly expressed support for the Iran-backed organization Hezbollah. The State department concluded that Nova Resistência is a Russian creation to mobilize the Brazilian people to fight on the side of Russia and its proxies in the Russian invasion of Ukraine.

== See also ==
- Aldo Rebelo
- Democratic Labour Party (Brazil)
- Brazilian Integralist Front
- Nouvelle Résistance
- Traditionalist Worker Party
- Russian disinformation
