= Una Mullally =

Irish journalist and broadcaster and actress (born 1983)

- Born: 8 March 1983 (age 43)
- Other name: UnaRocks
- Education: Coláiste Íosagáin; Dublin City University
- Occupation: Journalist
- Notable credit(s): Ceol ar an Imeall; In the Name of Love
- Partner: Sarah

Una Mullally (born 8 March 1983) is an Irish journalist and broadcaster from Dublin. She is a columnist with The Irish Times.

== Background ==
Mullally grew-up in Deansgrange in South County Dublin and attended Coláiste Íosagáin where she was head girl in her final year before going on to study at Dublin City University. She lives in Dublin.

== Career ==
Mullally was previously a staff reporter and columnist with the Sunday Tribune and a columnist with The Dubliner. and presented the alternative music show Ceol ar an Imeall ("Music on the Edge") for television channel TG4. She was one of the judges for the 2007 Choice Music Prize. She began blogging at "Pop Life" for The Irish Times in 2012.

She wrote the history book In the Name of Love documenting the movement for same-sex marriage in Ireland. The Broadcasting Authority of Ireland (BAI) subsequently upheld complaints against broadcasting channels RTÉ and Newstalk for comments on marriage equality by radio presenters Derek Mooney and Chris Donoghue – in respect of interviews that Mullaly did to promote the book – ruling that their comments breached guidelines on balanced broadcasting. Mullaly complained that these findings effectively denied her on-air publicity. The BAI issued a statement rejecting her claim.

In an article in The Irish Times on 27 April 2015, she discussed the difficulties of acknowledging being gay in the context of a diagnosis she had recently received of colorectal cancer. When a nurse took details of her next-of-kin, she admitted to hesitating before mentioning her partner, Sarah. Her article was well-received; in an interview with Ray D'Arcy on RTÉ Radio 1, she confirmed the cancer had spread to her lymph nodes.

In March 2015, she won Journalist of the Year at the GALA LGBT Awards.
