= Desperate Scousewives =

British television series

- Genre: Reality television
- Created by: Tiffany Ballou; Louise Cowmeadow
- Directed by: James Abbadi; Stten Agro; Philip Wood
- Starring: Amanda Harrington; Elissa Corrigan; Gill O'Toole; Debbie O'Toole; Jodie Lundstram; Chris Johnson; Mark Johnson; Jaiden Micheal; Sam Wools; Layla Flaherty; Chloe Cummings; Joe McMahon; Danny Latimer
- Country of origin: United Kingdom
- Original language: English
- No. of series: 1
- No. of episodes: 8

Production
- Executive producers: Michael Massey; Mal Young
- Production location: Liverpool
- Running time: 60 mins (inc. adverts)

Original release
- Network: E4; E4 HD
- Release: 28 November 2011 – 16 January 2012

Desperate Scousewives is a British scripted-reality television series based in Liverpool. It premiered on E4 at 10:00pm on 28 November 2011. It ran for eight episodes before being cancelled due to stagnating ratings and a perceived lack of interest in cast members from viewers. The show gained favourable viewing figures for its first episode, debuting with 500,000 viewers, 24% up on the E4 channel's slot average. However, episodes for the rest of the series were regularly below this figure and outside of the E4 top-10 weekly rankings.

The show's name is a play on words of the American comedy-drama Desperate Housewives and was said to be "Liverpool's answer to The Only Way Is Essex and Made in Chelsea". Repeats began airing on 4Music from 26 April 2012, sparking speculation from cast members that it may be a test run to recommission a new series on 4Music instead of E4. However, E4 reaffirmed their decision several times about the show's cancellation via their official Twitter page despite cast members continually claiming that a second series is in production.

== Background ==
Desperate Scousewives was created by Tiffany Ballou and Louise Cowmeadow and commissioned by E4. It was announced around the same time as another Liverpool-centred reality show that was ordered by MTV UK but ultimately never made, Mersey Shore (a play on Jersey Shore). Even before it aired, former Liverpool MP Steve Rotheram voiced concerns that it would merely fuel "regional racism".

== Overview ==
Liverpool, the Pool of Life, centre of the universe, no contest. Why live anywhere else when you've got it all here? The amazing buildings, the brilliant shops, the coolest nightlife and music - we invented that and all you know. Chop us in half and we've got Scouser written all the way through us. We're loud and we're proud, it must be something that they put in that water, the Mersey that is. This is Liverpool and these are our very real stories.

— Jodie Lundstram, in the opening scene

When Desperate Scousewives debuted, E4 described it as: "Meet the strong, independent women who quite literally run this town, looking to make a name for themselves in the city famous for its big personalities, big dreams, and even bigger hair. In a world revolving around football, fierce fashion, and that famous WAG style, Scouse girls and boys are all about having a boss night out on the town. But looking good is a 24/7 job as the ladies dress to impress to bag themselves the man of their dreams. The next generation of Liverpudlians determined to show the UK just what they're all about. Behind the blonde hair, 'Scouse eyebrows', football matches and club nights are real guys and girls determined to make a name for themselves, work hard and achieve a dream no matter how big or small. The girls spend every hard earned penny making sure they stand out from the crowd. And the boys of Liverpool have to work hard to keep up with them, woo them, and win their hearts. But they're not adverse [sic] to a bit of Premiership style preening themselves; some of Liverpool's most handsome and sought-after guys are pros at living a footballer's lifestyle, even if it is just off the pitch."

== Reception ==
=== Critical reception ===
The reaction to Desperate Scousewives was largely negative and prompted strong criticism from both the mainstream media and audiences alike. On Twitter, local Liverpudlians claimed that the show's cast were not representative of Liverpool and that they exploited it purely for entertainment purposes, as, despite its title, many cast members are not married and some did not even originate from Liverpool. The content of the show was also criticised heavily as being scripted and devoid of plot or substance and produced simply to establish a show based upon Merseyside following the format of other successful regional 'structured reality' shows such as The Only Way Is Essex, Made in Chelsea and Geordie Shore.

Panned by critics, Michael Hogan called the show "deplorable" and slated its "wannabe WAGs and two-dimensional dullards". Keith Watson of Metro described Desperate Scousewives as "depressing viewing" adding that the show "simply takes the TOWIE template up the Mersey Tunnel, at the bleached bottom end of which you'll find the most depressing bunch of faked-up, vacuous wannabes we've suffered since, well... the last of these unreal reality shows was launched. Five minutes in the company of Amanda, Joe, Layla and poison blogger Jaiden, and my faith in human nature was hitting zero. Not one of them can hold a conversation that's not about themselves. They all live in a toxic, self-absorbed bubble. And they're not even funny."

=== Ratings ===
Episode viewing figures from BARB.

Desperate Scousewives gained favourable viewing figures for its first episode debuting with 500,000 viewers, 24% up on the E4 channel's slot average. However, episodes for the rest of the series were regularly below this figure and outside of the E4 Top 10 weekly rankings.

Episode no.	Air date	Total viewers	E4 weekly ranking	References
1	28 November 2011	Over 500,000	Outside Top 10	
2	5 December 2011	655,000	8	
3	12 December 2011	Under 548,000	Outside Top 10	
4	19 December 2011	Under 553,000	Outside Top 10	
5	26 December 2011	Under 516,000	Unknown	
6	2 January 2012	Under 554,000	Outside Top 10	
7	9 January 2012	Under 612,000	Outside Top 10	
8	16 January 2012	Under 587,000	Outside Top 10	

== Cancellation ==
On 2 February 2012, E4 executive producers announced that they would not recommission Desperate Scousewives for a second series.

== Cast members ==
Main Cast member	Age	Occupation
Chloe Cummings	21	Part-time nurse, model and cousin of Sean
Layla Flaherty	28	Student
Amanda Harrington	30	Model, appeared in the Hot Shots Calendar
Jaiden Micheal	27	Celebrity blogger
Jodie Lundstram	27	Make up artist
Debbie O'Toole	26	Model, former Miss Liverpool, younger sister of Gill
Gill O'Toole	30	Older sister of Debbie
Supporting Cast member	Age	Occupation
Sean Clancy	24	Footballer and brother of Abbey Clancy
Elissa Corrigan	26	Journalist
Steven Dermott	30	Personal Trainer and love interest of Elissa
Chris Johnson	27	Salon owner and husband of Mark
Mark Johnson	25	Salon owner and husband of Chris
Danny Latimer	27	DJ
Keely Lundstram	33	Public Relations manager and cousin of Jodie
Joe McMahon	28	Club promoter
George Panayiotou	24	Entrepreneur
James Hall	28	Self-defence consultant
Adam Ramsey	28	Property manager
Sam Wooley	20	Student and Kate Middleton lookalike
