= Storm-1516 =

Russian propagandist group

Storm-1516 is a Russian propagandist group which creates and spreads online disinformation to further the interests of the Russian government. They have posted negative stories about American aid to Ukraine during the Russian invasion of Ukraine, as well as the Democratic Party candidates in the 2024 United States presidential election, presidential nominee Kamala Harris and vice presidential nominee Tim Walz.

Storm-1516 started as an offshoot of the former Internet Research Agency, another Russian propagandist group. They have a team which produces social media videos featuring paid actors as well as fake people generated through artificial intelligence. Notably, they spread false claims that Harris left a teenager disabled in a hit-and-run car accident in 2011, and that Walz was accused of sexual abuse by multiple former students of his at Mankato West High School; these narratives were a part of a Russian government effort to support the Republican presidential campaign of presidential nominee Donald Trump and vice presidential nominee JD Vance.

Storm-1516 has been linked to the website Nova Resistência. Reporting has described the broader network associated with the site as operating internationally, with indications that some elements of the network may be connected to Brazil.

== History ==
Storm-1516 was discovered by a team of media forensics researchers at Clemson University in fall 2023. More information about their tactics were released by the U.S. mission to the Organization for Security and Cooperation in Europe in July 2024. Storm-1516 makes accounts from supposed citizen journalists or whistleblowers on YouTube and X (Twitter), which they use to spread false narratives. The content is made in the English, Russian, Arabic, Finnish, and French languages. Disinformation researcher Alex Liberty says the content is reported "through different channels and in different formats in order to bring an image of legitimacy to the narrative". Their video production team likely operates in Saint Petersburg; the videos use actors and reference supposed primary sources which are not real. From this point, the narratives are spread by "other seemingly unaffiliated online networks". Since fall 2023, Storm-1516 has created and spread at least 50 false narratives about various topics.

Researchers at Microsoft use the prefix 'Storm' and a four-digit number to name emerging threat groups. Microsoft describes Storm-1516 as an offshoot of the former Internet Research Agency, a Russian propagandist group which made similar efforts, including advocating for the Donald Trump 2016 presidential campaign, before being shut down in 2023 (due to the head of the agency, Yevgeny Prigozhin, leading an unsuccessful rebellion against Russia that year). Microsoft researchers also theorize that Storm-1516 is directed by Russian anti-liberal think tank Center for Geopolitical Expertise, and is amplified by the Foundation for Battling Injustice, a propaganda group formerly ran by Prigozhin which pretends to be a human rights organization.

Similar Russian groups or individuals to Storm-1516 include Storm-1099, which creates fake news websites; Storm-1679, which creates documentaries and news reports from credible-looking fake organizations; and Ruza Flood and Volga Flood/Rybar, which also post disinformation from fake social media accounts. Previously in 2024, a Russian media company named Tenet Media operated by paying American right-wing influencers to make videos for them; the company was shut down in early October.

=== American aid to Ukraine ===
Many of Storm-1516's narratives are meant to "diminish Western support for military aid in Ukraine following Russia’s invasion [of Ukraine], a contentious issue in [the U.S.] Congress". In May 2024, they made a fake video in which Ukrainian soldiers burn an effigy of Donald Trump. Many of Storm-1516's narratives focus on supposed misallocation of aid by Ukrainian officials. One of them states that Ukrainian leaders had spent U.S. aid money to purchase yachts, which was spread by U.S. representative Marjorie Taylor Greene, who said: "Anyone who votes to fund Ukraine is funding the most corrupt money scheme of any foreign war in our country's history. And forcing the American people to pay for it." Others alleged that the family of Ukrainian president Volodymyr Zelenskyy owns a "luxurious villa" on the Egyptian coast, and that Olena Zelenska, the First Lady of Ukraine, spent $1 million of aid money in New York City and received a 4.5 million Euro Bugatti sportscar from a car salesman. Countering the fact that Russian troll farms have advocated for Donald Trump online since 2016, Storm-1516's posts allege that troll farms in Ukraine are working to have Trump lose the 2024 election. In one video made by Storm-1516, a supposed Ukrainian troll farm operative describes a plot by the CIA to have Trump lose.

==== Hamas videos ====
In October 2023, amidst Gaza war, Storm-1516 created a video in which a supposed Hamas militant (whose face is obscured by a headscarf) thanked Zelenskyy for a "new shipment of weapons and military equipment" from Ukraine to Hamas; shipments between the two militaries did not happen. The same actor seemingly appears in a later video by Storm-1516; before the 2024 Summer Olympics in Paris, a video by a person with the same outfit and background warned that Hamas would attack the Olympics, and that “rivers of blood will flow through the streets of Paris” in response to France's support of Israel. The video, which went viral on X and Telegram, was revealed by Microsoft days before the Olympics started to be the work of Storm-1516; Hamas official Izzat al-Risheq also said the video was fake.

=== 2024 U.S. presidential election ===
On September 18, 2024, Brad Smith of Microsoft testified to the U.S. Senate Intelligence Committee on Russian disinformation, and revealed that Storm-1516 had shifted its main focus from Ukraine matters to the 2024 U.S. presidential election as the election got closer. In the election, which was held on November 5, the main candidates were Democrats Kamala Harris and Tim Walz, against Republicans Donald Trump and JD Vance. The Russian government has engaged in a widespread influence campaign to support the Trump campaign, which includes the work of Storm-1516. They have made negative posts about Harris and Walz as well as the previous presumptive nominee for the Democratic Party, Joe Biden, before he dropped out of the race. Their posts implicating Harris and Walz in conspiracy theories started in late August. Storm-1516's operation involves over 100 websites which praise the Russian government, run by John Dougan, a former police officer from Florida who now lives in Moscow.

Storm-1516 spread an allegation that Trump's Secret Service detail found a wiretap in his office at his Mar-a-Lago residence, said to be "presumably planted" after the FBI searched Mar-a-Lago as part of a criminal investigation into Trump in August 2022. In another narrative, Kamala Harris was accused of illegally and fatally shooting an endangered black rhino named Casuba as part of a diplomatic visit to a safari in Zambia; this was spread by propagandists on X who have hundreds of thousands of followers, as well as Chay Bowes, a contributor to Russian state news organization RT.

==== Kamala Harris videos ====
In a video produced by Storm-1516 and spread by John Dougan, supposed Harris supporters attack an attendee at one of Trump's rallies, which Microsoft said was made to inflame racial tensions in America. A similar video was posted on Election Day, of a man claiming two Harris supporters assaulted a Trump supporter at a Wisconsin polling place. In the week leading up to Election Day, a video was posted of a man who claimed to be from Haiti, saying he planned to vote for Harris multiple times using several driver's licenses.

In another of their videos, which received 2.7 million views, a woman claims that as a teenager living in San Francisco in 2011, she was paralyzed in a hit-and-run car accident started by Harris. The woman in question, named "Alicia Brown" in the video, was a paid actor. The Daily Beast writes: "A voiceover claims Brown suffered injuries to her “pelvis, ribs, and spine,” had to undergo 11 surgeries, and lost the ability to walk. CBS News, however, found at the time that an X-ray shown in the video was taken from a medical journal, and a picture of a car crash in the video was taken from a 2018 accident in Guam." San Francisco police stated that the alleged accident never happened, and the news station the video claims to be the story's source, KBSF-TV, does not exist. Additionally, on a fake KBSF-TV website, the supposed victim's name was spelled as "Alisha Brown". The narrative spread on X via the hashtag #HitAndRunKamala, as well as on TikTok, and was posted by multiple members of Congress, including JD Vance. There was also fake video made showing Harris leaving the scene of a car accident.

==== Tim Walz sexual abuse allegations ====
In October 2024, allegations made by Storm-1516 that Tim Walz has been accused of sexual abuse by his former students (when he taught at Mankato West High School in Minnesota) have spread widely online. McKenzie Sadeghi of NewsGuard said: "The false narrative appears to be part of a wider campaign pushed by pro-Kremlin media and QAnon influencers ahead of the [2024] US elections aimed at portraying Walz, whose political appeal is as an everyman schoolteacher and coach, as a pedophile who had inappropriate relationships with minors".

The narrative started on October 5, when a QAnon-based radio show named RedPill78 interviewed John Dougan as well as a man named "Rick", the latter alleging to be Walz' student in 2004 and accused Walz of sexual abuse without evidence. "Rick" said he was a foreign exchange student from Kazakhstan who received his education in the U.S. under the State Department's Future Leaders Exchange program. A State Department spokesperson, however, said that no Kazakh students attended Mankato West High School from 2000 to 2020. The Mankato Area Public Schools communications director said the allegations were "outlandish".

A week after the radio show interview, an anonymous account on X named "Black Insurrectionist" posted a clip from the show, which gained 800,000 views. The account was created in 2023 and was followed by right-wing figureheads Donald Trump Jr. and Roger Stone; two dozen posts by Black Insurrectionist about the allegations have been viewed 33 million times on X as of October 2024, as well as having been shared on Instagram, Telegram, Truth Social, and TikTok.

In mid-October, the account posted screenshots from a supposed email written by someone who said that as a minor, they were sexually abused by Walz at a concert in 1995. Formatting errors within the images brought up concerns over their authenticity; the date and time were not consistent with how those elements are shown on real emails, and a text cursor appeared in the image, as if it was currently being written by whoever took the screenshots. Google searches for the terms "Tim Walz abuse" and "Tim Walz pedophile" spiked around this time. Days later, another conspiracy theorist's account on the site posted a video in which they claimed to have spoken to a victim of Walz; this video received millions of views. A similar second video, of another alleged student of Walz, was posted by a QAnon account on October 16; before the video was deleted, it received 4.3 million views. An analysis by Wired concluded that the person in the second video is not real, and that the video was made using deepfake technology. On October 19, over 100 of John Dougan's websites simultaneously published a story which contained these screenshots and videos. At the same time, the Black Insurrectionist account was deleted.

The allegations were posted by right-wing influencers Candace Owens and Jack Posobiec, and reported on by MSN. Candace Owens discussed the story on her podcast, that episode receiving 630,000 views. On October 21, Wired quoted multiple disinformation researchers who say that the narrative is the work of Storm-1516.

==== Fake video of ballots being destroyed ====
An X video post on October 24, 2024, purported to show a man searching through mail-in ballots from Bucks County, Pennsylvania, and ripping up those with a vote for Donald Trump. The Bucks County Board of Elections noted that the "envelope and materials depicted in this video are clearly not authentic materials belonging to or distributed by the Bucks County Board of Elections." The video was first posted by an account that promotes the QAnon conspiracy theory and has been linked to Storm-1516.

=== Alberta separatist websites and social media accounts ===
After the 2025 Canadian federal election, a website known as albertaseparatist.com sprang up alongside a YouTube and TikTok account of the same name. It was later found that both the website and social media accounts were created by Storm-1516.

According to a joint report by the Global Centre for Democratic Resilience, the Centre for Artificial Intelligence, Data and Conflict, and DisinfoWatch, "Russian-aligned information infrastructure" and other online social media accounts are using Albertan grievances in order to push separatist narratives and undermine Canada's democratic integrity, national security, and cognitive sovereignty.

=== 2026 false claims targeting Germany ===
On 19 January 2026, Nova Resistência published a claim alleging that Germany would invest €1.4 billion in the construction of a football stadium in the Brazilian city of Belém as an act of reparation by Chancellor Friedrich Merz. The report asserted that the alleged payment was linked to remarks Merz was said to have made during the November 2025 climate summit, in which he purportedly described Belém as "not a beautiful place."

German government officials rejected the claim. A government spokesperson and the Federal Ministry for Economic Cooperation and Development stated that the reported stadium financing was fabricated.

Additional unsubstantiated allegations targeting Merz have circulated online, including claims that he shot a polar bear in Canada.

=== Peter Magyar campaign in 2026 ===
In April 2026 an obscure website created on 6 April published a story about Peter Magyar, Hungarian prime minister candidate, "cooking his children's puppy in a microwave" and other rather disturbing behaviors. The story referred to a non-existent autobiography of his ex-wife Judith Varga and was promptly debunked by her. Techniques used by the campaign were identified as matching Storm-1516 by Polish fact-checking portal Demagog.

=== 2026 United States midterm elections ===
In October 2026, Graphika reported that Storm-1516 produced deepfake videos against James Talarico, alleging sexual assault against a student. Using a "nearly identical" narrative to that used against Walz in 2024, the posts were quickly spread by inorganic social media accounts.

== See also ==
- Election denial movement in the United States
- Libs of TikTok
- Spamoflague
- Springfield pet-eating hoax
- Crucified boy
