= Niamh Uí Bhriain =

Irish Right Wing, Eurosceptic and anti-abortion activist

- Born: Niamh Nic Mhathúna; 1970 (age 55–56); County Cork, Ireland
- Known for: Euroscepticism, anti-abortion campaigning, campaigning in opposition to LBGT rights and lobbying.
- Relatives: Úna Bean Mhic Mhathúna (mother); Séamus Mac Mathúna (father); Íde Nic Mhathúna (sister); Dónal Mac Mathúna (brother)

Niamh Uí Bhriain (née Nic Mhathúna; born 1970) is an Irish Catholic policy lobbyist, anti-abortion campaigner and Eurosceptic activist. She became prominent on the campaign against abortion in Ireland. She is the spokesperson for the anti-abortion political pressure group, the Life Institute.

== Early life ==
Uí Bhriain was born in County Cork in 1970. She first came to prominence as a co-founder and original leader of Youth Defence. She says that the inspiration behind the group came from a visit by American anti-abortion activist Joseph Scheidler to her parents' house during the 1983 referendum, during which he had brought with him graphic images of aborted foetuses. She is the daughter of Úna Bean Mhic Mhathúna, who, as Secretary of the Irish Housewives’ Union, became famous for her letter to then Taoiseach, Charles Haughey. In this letter, she denounced "career women" and called for women with children to be laid off from the Irish Public Sector. She also denounced pre-menstrual advice for children and sex education, claiming it was disgusting.

== Media contributions ==
Uí Bhriain is a contributor to print and online media publications, submitting letters and articles on the topics and campaigns she supports. Her contributions have been published in The Irish Times, the Irish Independent and The Irish Catholic newspapers, as well as on online sites such as TheJournal.ie.

== 1992 general election ==
Uí Bhriain ran for Dáil Éireann as an independent anti-abortion candidate for Dublin Central in the 1992 general election. She gained 514 first preferences, amounting to 1.4% of the total vote, and was eliminated on the fifth count with a total of 552 votes.

== Youth Defence ==
Uí Bhriain co-founded the anti-abortion campaign group Youth Defence.

She spoke at the Catholic event, Meeting for friendship among peoples, in Rimini, Italy, alongside the founder and leader of the far-right Forza Nuova party, Roberto Fiore, in August 2000.

== Libel action against Independent Newspapers ==
In 1997, Justine McCarthy alleged in the Sunday Independent that Uí Bhriain had received training from American anti-abortion group, Operation Rescue, in how to blow up abortion clinics. Uí Bhriain sued for libel, and in 2007 won an undisclosed sum from Independent Newspapers.

== Same sex couples' adoption rights ==
Uí Bhriain was the spokesperson for the Mother and Child Campaign, which campaigned against the introduction in Ireland of the right for same-sex couples to adopt children. She was quoted as saying:

"I would not be confident in knowing that, God forbid, something happened to myself or my husband that my children would be raised in a household where there was a same-sex union. The adoption board and An Taoiseach have refused to give assurances to Irish parents that the children will not be placed in households where there are same-sex unions and will not be raised by homosexuals or lesbians."

The Mother and Child Campaign also claimed in April 2006 that children raised by same-sex couples were more likely to develop drug problems and mental health issues.

== Cóir ==
Uí Bhriain was a spokesperson for Catholic/nationalist group Cóir during both Treaty of Lisbon campaigns (the first referendum in June 2008, which was rejected, and Lisbon II in October 2009 which was approved).

== Gript ==
Uí Bhriain is a director and assistant editor of Gript Media and holds 50% of its shares. She placed its editor, John McGuirk on leave in March 2026. In May 2026, McGuirk resigned and accused Uí Bhriain of making him a "fall guy" for controversial editorial decisions. Gript issued counter-allegations against McGuirk, while Uí Bhriain indicated she was seeking legal advice on his claims.

== See also ==
- Abortion in the Republic of Ireland
