= Paddy Cosgrave =

Irish entrepreneur (born 1983)

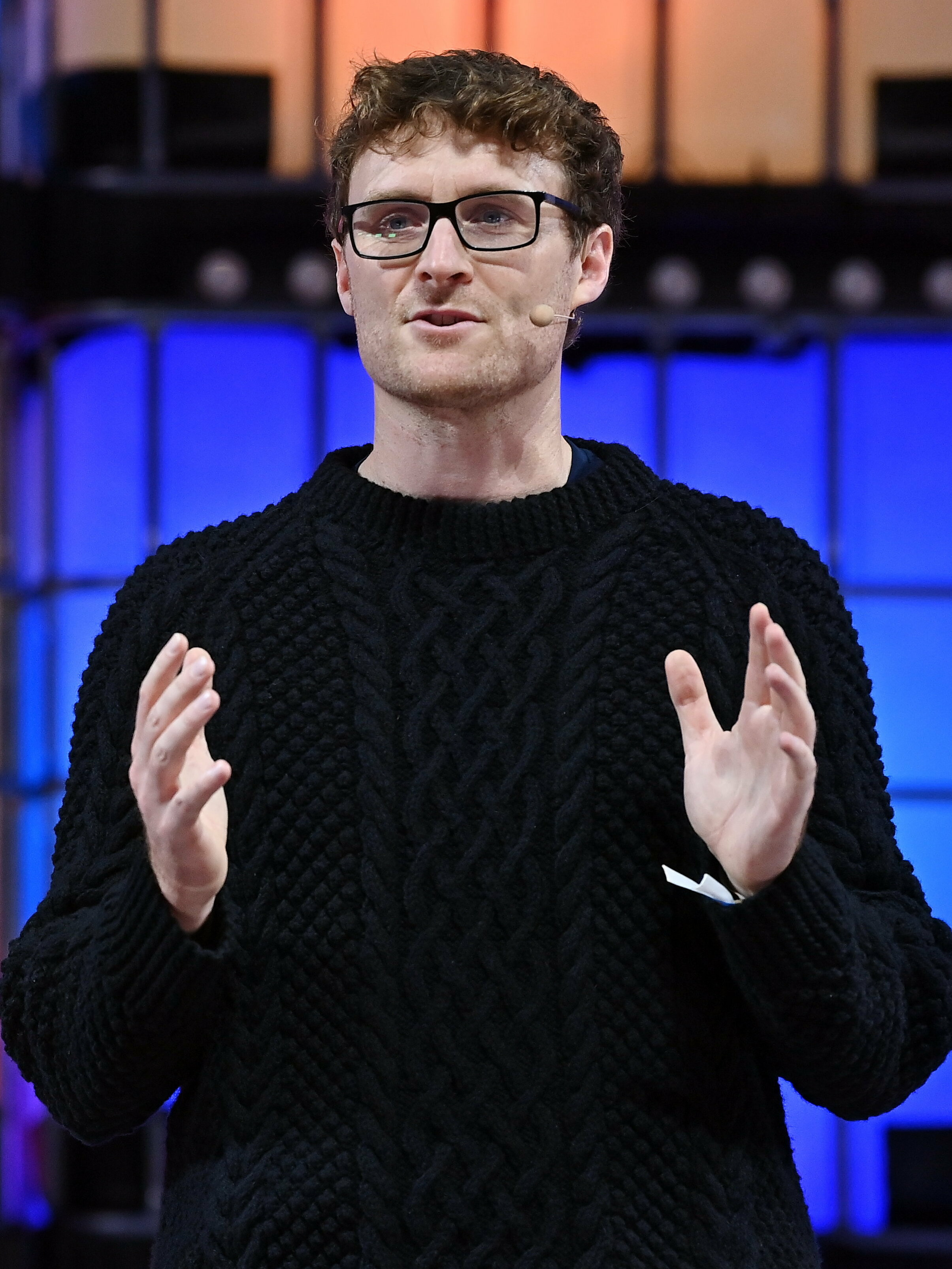
- Cosgrave at Web Summit 2022
- Born: 19 March 1983 (age 43); County Wicklow, Ireland
- Occupation: Entrepreneur
- Known for: Co-founder of Web Summit
- Spouse: Faye Dinsmore (m. 2016)
- Children: 3

Patrick Cosgrave (born 19 March 1983) is an Irish entrepreneur. He is a co-founder of Web Summit, an annual technology conference. He was CEO of Web Summit until October 2023 when he resigned and was replaced by Katherine Maher. Maher left after three months and, in April 2024, staff were told Cosgrave had decided to return as CEO.

== Early life and education ==
Cosgrave grew up on a farm in County Wicklow. He was educated at Glenstal Abbey School and Trinity College Dublin, where he studied business, Economics and Social Studies (BESS). While at Trinity he was president of the University Philosophical Society (The Phil) and editor of Piranha, a satirical college magazine. During his presidency of The Phil, the society introduced Phil Speaks, an outreach initiative aimed at promoting debating and public speaking in Irish secondary schools. Cosgrave graduated with a II-1 BA from Trinity College, Dublin's BESS program in 2006.

== Career ==
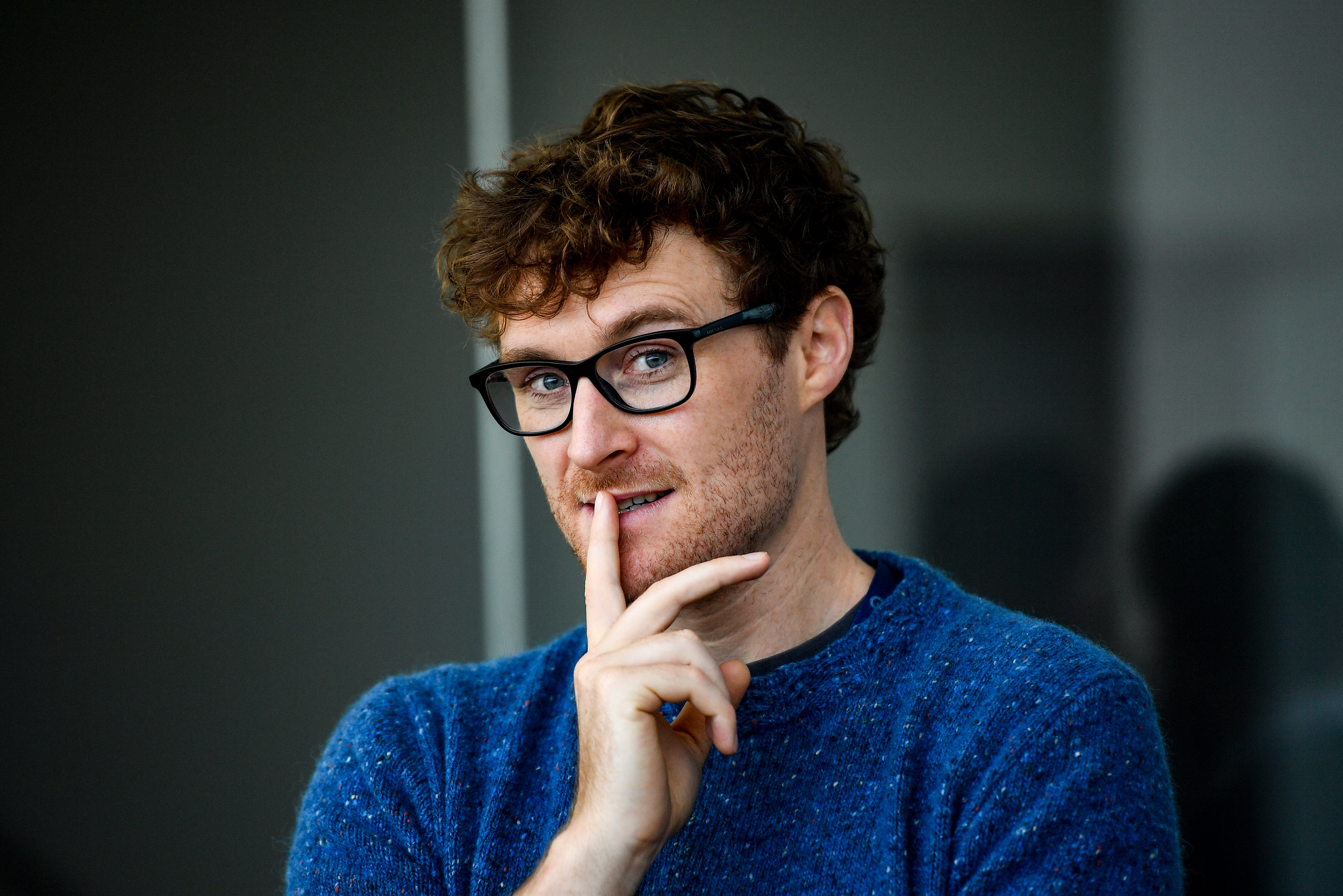
Patrick "Paddy" Cosgrave in 2019

Cosgrave was the executive director of Rock the Vote Ireland, a campaign launched in April 2007 to encourage young people to vote in the May 2007 Irish general election. He was a co-founder of MiCandidate, a website that "provided detailed information on every candidate running in the 2007 general election". The company was sold for "an undisclosed sum" in October 2009. In 2008, he was involved with the foundation of an Irish Undergraduate Awards scheme.

Cosgrave is a co-founder of the Web Summit and F.ounders conferences.

Cosgrave was awarded the 2015 Irish Exporters Association annual gold medal. He was listed 18th in the 2015 Wired UK list of the "100 most influential individuals in the wider Wired world".

Cosgrave is an Ambassador for the European Innovation Council for the years 2021–2027.

Cosgrave, through the Web Summit, was an investor in The Ditch news website.

== Controversies ==
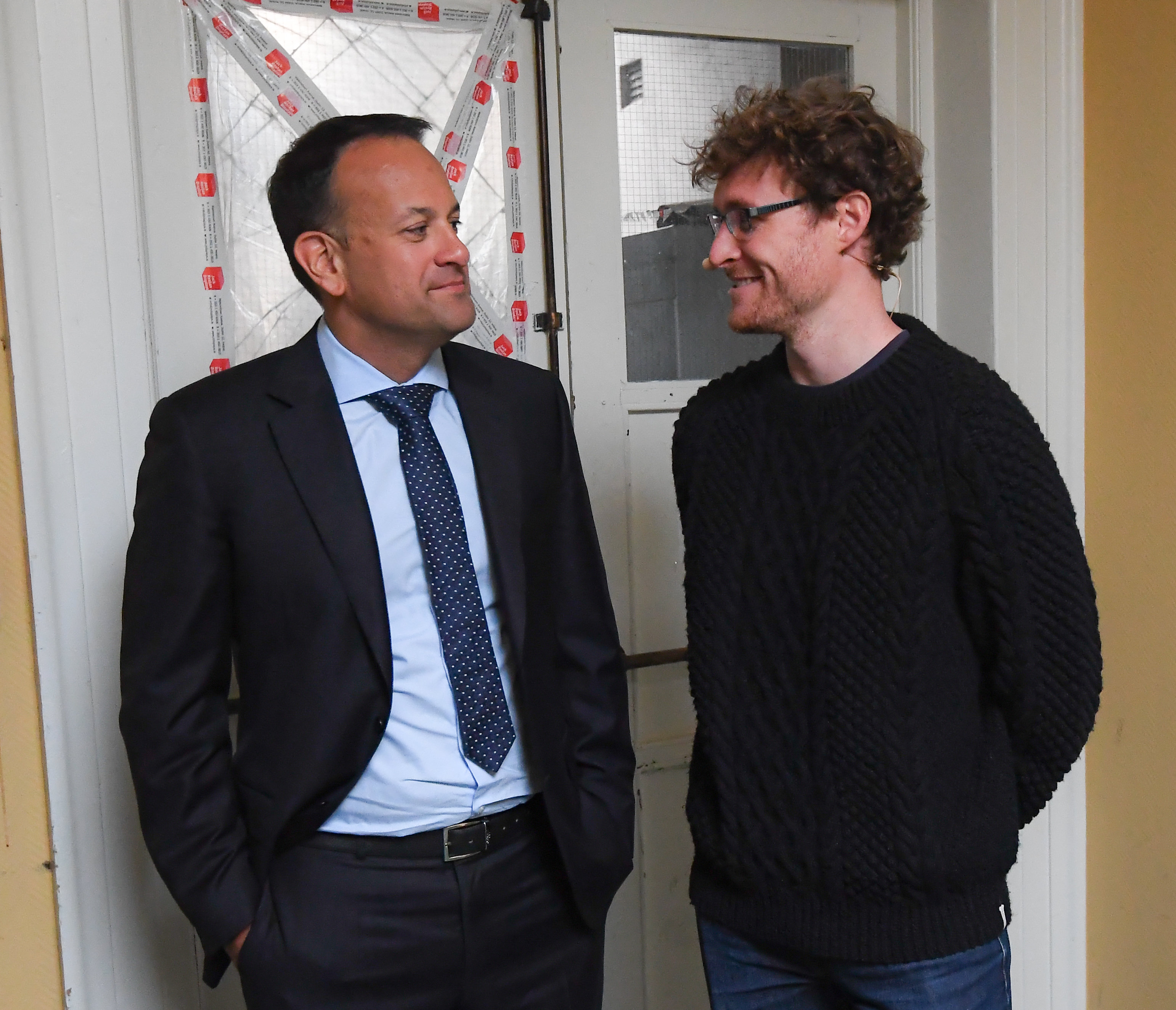
Cosgrave (right) with Taoiseach Leo Varadkar

In March 2012, Cosgrave was appointed to the board of the Higher Education Authority (HEA). While still a member of the board in 2014, Cosgrave said that his company would recruit graduates with II.1 degrees from Trinity College Dublin or with first class honours degrees from other Irish universities. The HEA said Cosgrave's views on the value of degrees at different universities were his own and not those of the authority. The matter was raised at the May 2014 board meeting of the HEA, with the board issuing a statement saying that Cosgrave's comments "contained several inaccuracies" and that his "and we do not agree with Paddy Cosgrave's personal view that a 2.1 from TCD is the equivalent of a first-class honours degree from other universities".

In 2015, Cosgrave apologised for falsely taking credit for building the Tito ticketing application.

In 2018, at the Collision tech conference in New Orleans, the IDA was sponsoring a drinks reception for chief executives of around 200 companies. According to former Web Summit director David Kelly, as a senior female IDA executive gave a short welcome speech, Paddy Cosgrave stood beside her "slow clapping". An email from the IDA described the alleged incident as "particularly regrettable".

The Web Summit has been the subject of several controversies under Cosgrave's stewardship, including its move from Dublin to Lisbon, the organisation of a dinner at Portugal's National Pantheon, and the invitation of Marine Le Pen as a speaker, which was subsequently withdrawn.

=== Criticism for comments ===
Cosgrave criticised the Irish tax system in 2019 for allowing companies and funds to avoid tax. When asked at a press conference if his stance could be viewed as hypocrisy, Cosgrave agreed as Amaranthine, an investment fund set up by Cosgrave with other Web Summit founders, is based in California but registered in Delaware - an effective tax shelter.

On 30 March 2020, Cosgrave posted a tribute on Twitter to the "4 nurses in Ireland who fought so hard for so many patients, but who themselves fell ill, and have now passed. RIP." The following day, the Health Service Executive tweeted that "Contrary to tweets sent yesterday - thankfully none of our nurses have died in Ireland from #COVID19." Phil Ni Sheaghdha, general secretary of the Irish Nurses & Midwives Organisation (INMO), accused Cosgrave of "scaremongering". On 8 June, Cosgrave "unreservedly" apologised on Twitter to the HSE and the INMO. On 14 May 2023, in an RTÉ Radio interview, Cosgrave said that his original tweet was correct.

Also in 2020, Cosgrave was criticised for using what some inferred as sectarian and pejorative language in calling Neale Richmond a "Castle Catholic".

Paddy Cosgrave
(@paddycosgrave)
tweeted:

I’m shocked at the rhetoric and actions of so many Western leaders & governments, with the exception in particular of Ireland’s government, who for once are doing the right thing. War crimes are war crimes even when committed by allies, and should be called out for what they are.

13 Oct 2023

In 2023, during the Gaza war, Cosgrave publicly stated on X that "War crimes are war crimes even when committed by allies, and should be called out for what they are", referring to war crimes committed by Israel in the war against Gaza. He also denounced the attacks by Hamas and stated that he was "devastated to see the level of innocent civilian casualties in Israel and Gaza". Although he remained firm with his previous condemnation, he later on apologized, and subsequently resigned as CEO of Web Summit on 21 October after companies like Intel, Siemens, Google, Amazon and Meta withdrew from the 2023 event. In April 2024, Cosgrave's decision to return as CEO was announced.

=== Court cases ===
In 2020, Maitiú Ó Tuathail took legal proceedings against Cosgrave regarding comments Cosgrave made on his Twitter profile. The case was settled outside of court.

In November 2021, an Irish High Court case was filed while the Web Summit conference was underway in Portugal. Web Summit co-founder David Kelly, who owned 12% of Web Summit shares, accused Paddy Cosgrave of oppressing him and attempting to blackmail him to act against Daire Hickey, a former Web Summit director who held 7% of Web Summit shares. In a separate action, Daire Hickey accused Cosgrave of hacking a rival Irish events company. Hickey accused Cosgrave of regularly demeaning and chastising staff members. Cosgrave was suing Kelly for alleged breaches of his fiduciary duties as a director of Web Summit. In March 2025, the legal disputes between Cosgrave, Kelly and Hickey were settled, with Cosgrave acquiring Kelly's 12% and Hickey's 7% shareholdings in Manders Terrace, the company behind Web Summit. The settlement terms, including the share purchase price, were not publicly disclosed.

In February 2022, Cosgrave was sued by John McGuirk for defamation for Tweets posted in December 2021.

In April 2022, Cosgrave was sued by a former Web Summit PR executive, Mark O’Toole, in the Irish High Court. O’Toole's action related to comments made by Cosgrave in a number of tweets, which O’Toole alleges to be untrue, malicious and defamatory.

In November 2022, Cosgrave was sued for defamation by businessman Robert Quirke over a tweet sent in March 2021. Quirke, who is the CEO of Roqu Media International, claimed that the tweet was clearly calculated to damage his reputation. The tweet referred to a deal involving Quirke and Roqu and the HSE National Ambulance Service for the provision of ventilators during the COVID-19 pandemic. Cosgrave alleged that Quirke had spent "taxpayer cash on super cars" and then "fled" the country. The defamation case was dismissed in January 2025 because the High Court had been unable to contact Quirke for over a year. Quirke was made liable for Cosgrave's costs of around €60,000.

== Personal life ==
Cosgrave married model-turned-designer Faye Dinsmore in 2016 and has three sons. In 2022 Cosgrave purchased a Georgian manor and lands in Rossnowlagh, County Donegal for €1.8M.
