= Layla Flaherty =

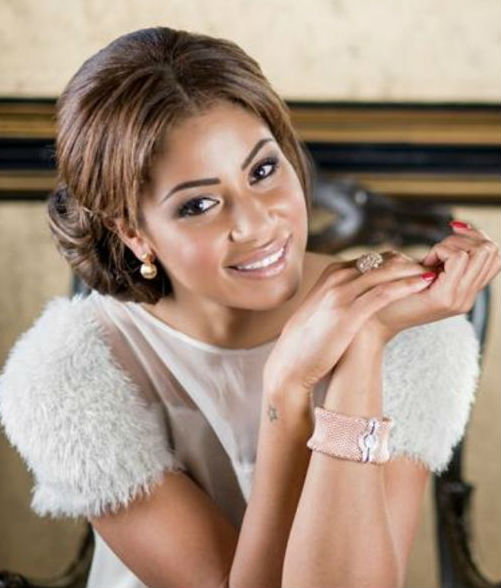
- Flaherty in 2013
- Born: Layla Flaherty; 1983; Galway, Ireland
- Occupation(s): Model, TV personality
- Modeling information
- Height: 5 ft 11 in (1.80 m)
- Agency: TM Media UK

Layla Flaherty is an Irish model and actress who appeared in the ‘scripted-reality’ TV show Desperate Scousewives, which was broadcast on E4 in 2011. More recently, she appeared on an episode of Real Housewives of Cheshire.

== Early life ==
Layla Flaherty was born in Galway in 1983 to a Jamaican father and an Irish mother. She moved to Liverpool in 2005.

== Career ==
Layla Flaherty became known as a cast member in the ‘scripted-reality’ E4 show, Desperate Scousewives.

Since the cancellation of Desperate Scousewives, Layla has made a number of media appearances. In March 2012, she made an appearance on The Late Late Show, during which she discussed being cyber-bullied via her Twitter account.

Layla appeared in Sky Living's Chick Fix in July 2011.

In June 2012, Layla participated in the third series of TV3's Celebrity Salon, alongside Nikki Grahame, Philip Olivier, Glenda Gilson, and others.

In October 2012, she appeared as a guest on Katherine Lynch and Brian Dowling's TV show, Big Fat Breakfast Show at Night, alongside Kerry Katona on RTÉ Two. In 2015, Layla appeared in an episode of The Real Housewives of Cheshire with her dog modelling agency Urban Paws Uk which was filmed around a cover shoot and feature for the popular dog publication K9 magazine.

Layla has appeared in Irish magazines such as VIP, LIFE Magazine, and Galway Now. She has also appeared in UK publications Love It and Heat.

== Other activities ==
Layla has a diploma in speech and drama, as well as an education in mental health nursing. In 2012, she enrolled at the Gaiety School of Acting, Dublin.
