= Rotimi Adebari =

Nigerian-born Irish politician

Laois County Councillor
- In office 2009–2014
- Constituency: Portlaoise

Personal details
- Born: 1964 (age 61–62) Okeodan, Ogun State, Nigeria
- Party: Independent
- Education: University of Benin

Rotimi Adebari (born 1964) is a Nigerian-born Irish politician. Adebari was elected as the first black mayor in Ireland in 2007.

== Early life and background ==
Adebari was born 1964 in Okeodan, Ogun State, and studied economics at the University of Benin.

== Life in Ireland ==
=== Failed Asylum claim ===
Adebari arrived in Dublin with his wife and two children in 2000. Adebari claimed that as after he converted from Islam to Christianity, he fled Nigeria in 2000, and made a claim for asylum on the grounds of religious persecution.

His application was rejected because of a lack of evidence that he had personally suffered persecution, Adebari did however gain automatic residency when his wife gave birth to a son in Ireland shortly after they arrived.

=== Election to Laois County Council ===
Adebari and his family settled in County Laois. Adebari completed his master's degree in intercultural studies at Dublin City University. and set up a firm called Optimum Point Consultancy.

In 2004, he was elected as a town councilor in local elections. In June 2007 he was elected as mayor of Portlaoise Town Council (9 members), with support from Fine Gael, Sinn Féin and an Independent councillor. In the 2009 local elections he was re-elected to the town council and also to Laois County Council for the Portlaoise electoral area.

=== Alleged work in United Kingdom ===
In 2007, Adebari denied claims that he was a train operator in London who worked out of the Queen's Park depot on the Bakerloo line. Multiple London Underground employees, including Paddy Clarke, a retired tube driver from County Louth, stated that Adebari worked as a train driver in London during the late 1990s before moving to Ireland. Clarke stated, "at the very least 50 drivers and six or more managers will remember him. His photograph and signature are on file with London Underground's personnel office which were used in the issue of his free travel-pass and identity card." Adebari asserted he travelled to Ireland directly from Nigeria via Paris, and never worked or lived in London at any time.

Adebari ran as an independent candidate in the 2011 general election for the Laois–Offaly constituency, he failed to get elected and received 628 1st preference votes (0.85%). In 2014, Adebari ran as an Independent in the Local Election but failed to gain election and lost his position on Laois County Council.
