= Ola Majekodunmi =

Nigerian-Irish writer and presenter

- Born: Olufemi Wuraola Majekodunmi; Lagos, Nigeria
- Years active: 2014–present
- Employer: Freelance

Ola Majekodunmi is a Nigerian-Irish presenter, writer, producer and Gaeilgeoir.

== Career ==
Majekodunmi started presenting a radio show with Raidió na Life in 2014, presenting Seinnliosta an tSathairn and later Afra-Éire. She is a frequent guest contributor on other radio shows on RTÉ Radio 1, RTÉ Raidió na Gaeltachta, RTÉ 2FM, RTÉ 2XM, BBC Radio Ulster, BBC Radio Foyle and BBC Radio 1Xtra. She also tends to feature as a contributor on TV too with RTÉ, TG4 and the BBC. She is also one of the core contributors to the Motherfoclóir podcast hosted by Darach Ó Séaghdha. She has been nominated for National Student Media Awards in the Iriseoireacht trí Ghaeilge category and for the Student Achievement Awards Ireland in the feachtas bliain na Gaeilge category. She was the MC of the Dance Zone at the 2018 Africa Day in Dublin. She was one of the featured guests on RTÉ Radio 1 show Pantisocracy, hosted by Panti.

In 2018, Majekodunmi directed the short film What does Irishness Look Like?, which examined the issues around prejudice and national identity in Ireland. She is a co-founder of Beyond Representation, which seeks to bring together and celebrate women of colour in Ireland. Majekodunmi has spoken about issues relating to racism in Ireland, and about the problematic terminology in Irish relating to black people.

In November 2020 Majekodunmi was appointed to the board of Foras na Gaeilge for a four-year term.

In 2022, she started presenting a new music show, 'Unheard' on RTÉ 2XM highlighting black and Gaelach artists.

== Personal life ==
Majekodunmi was born in Lagos, Nigeria. She moved to Dublin, Ireland with her family in 1997, when she was seven months old. Majekodunmi attended all-Irish schools, Gaelscoil Lios na nÓg and Coláiste Íosagáin. She holds a degree in English, Media and Cultural studies and an MA in Digital Broadcast Production, both from Dún Laoghaire Institute of Art, Design and Technology.
