= Gript =

Irish conservative news and opinion website

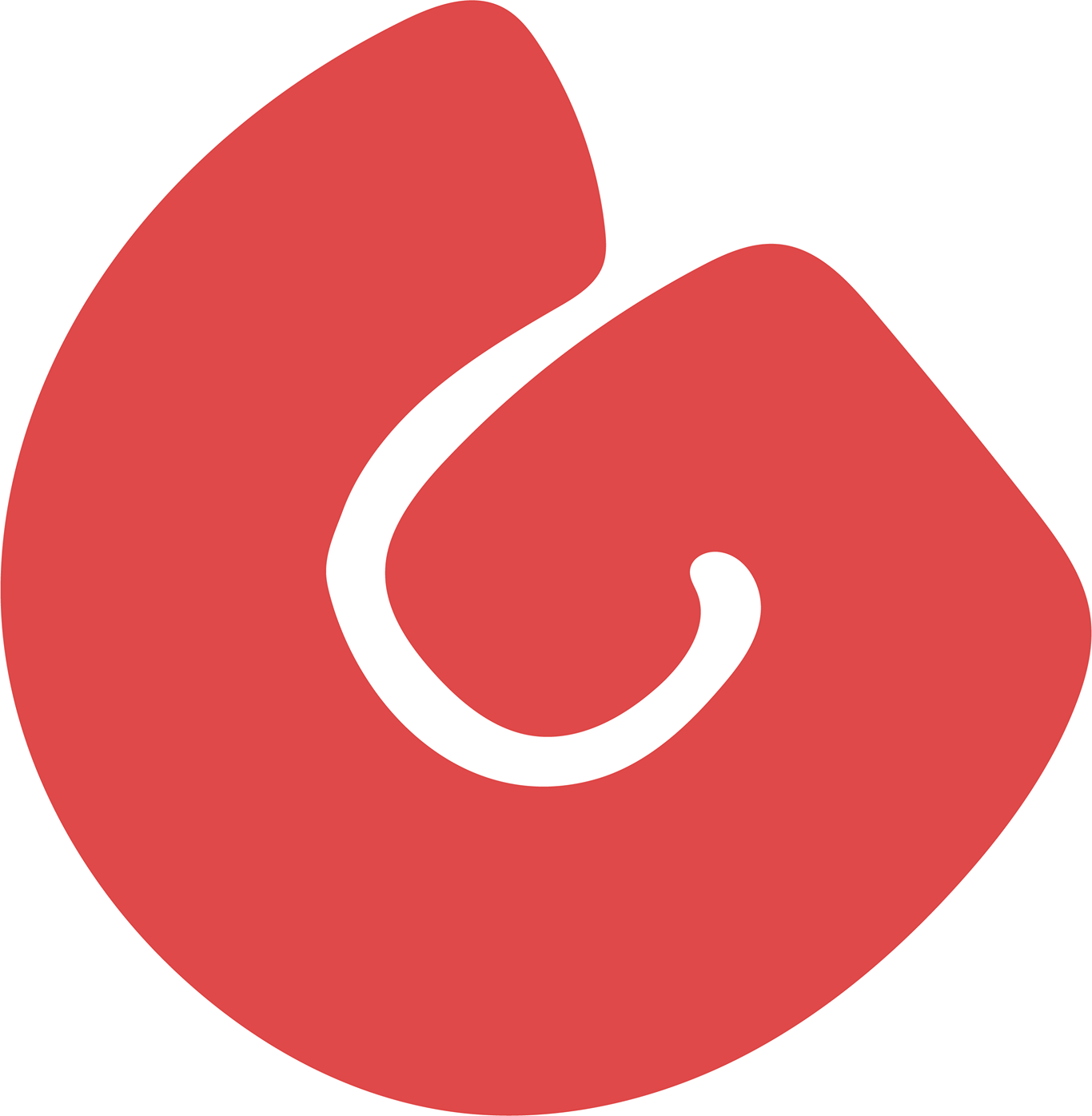
- Website type: News website
- Available in: English
- Owner: Gript Media Limited
- Founder: John McGuirk
- Website: gript.ie
- Launched: 2019

Gript, or Gript Media, is an Irish conservative news and opinion website established in 2019.

== History and ownership ==
Gript was founded in 2019 by political commentator John McGuirk. By 2021, Gript's weekly readership had grown to 120,000. In 2025, according to national regulator Coimisiún na Meán, approximately 5% of Irish adults accessed Gript weekly. It is a member of the Press Council of Ireland.

The outlet is 50% owned by activist Niamh Uí Bhriain and 50% by Evelyn Porter. Gript received initial funding from the Irish anti-abortion advocacy group The Life Institute, directed by Uí Bhriain, though McGuirk stated in 2021 that Gript no longer received funding from that group.

In May 2026, Gript suspended McGuirk as editor pending an internal process, following an alleged inappropriate relationship with a staff member he managed that caused a conflict of interest, and a separate sexual harassment complaint. McGuirk subsequently resigned and characterised the dispute as rooted in editorial differences, which Gript denied.

== Content ==
Generally categorized as having a conservative or right-wing editorial line, Gript has described its mission as creating a space to challenge what it characterizes as the "consensus views" expressed by "our schools, our universities, our media and our politicians". The Irish Times has described it as "Ireland’s most prominent conservative media organisation" and "Ireland's answer to Fox News".

The outlet publishes news, commentary, podcasts, and analysis with a focus on Irish politics and culture. Most content on the website is free, with some articles paywalled and accessible via subscription.

In November 2023, Gript removed an article relating to the Parnell Square stabbing attack that incorrectly identified a person unconnected to the incident. Gript claimed the report had been sourced to a Gardaí member.
