= John McGuirk =

Irish writer, and political commentator and candidate

- Born: 2 March 1984 (age 42); Monaghan, Ireland
- Education: St. Macartan's College
- Alma mater: Trinity College Dublin
- Occupations: Writer, communications manager
- Political party: Fianna Fáil (-2003) Fine Gael (2007) New Vision (2011)
- Website: www.mcguirk.eu (archived)

John McGuirk (born 2 March 1984) is an Irish writer and political commentator. He is a contributor to The Irish Catholic and was formerly editor of Gript, a news outlet, until 2026 when he was suspended during a dispute, and later resigned.

McGuirk and Gript have both been described as conservative, right-wing, and far-right. McGuirk does not agree with being labelled as "far-right" and has successfully engaged in legal action against others for defamation for using the term.

== Early life ==
McGuirk was born in Ballybay, County Monaghan. He studied for the Leaving Cert at St. Macartan’s College in Monaghan. He subsequently attended Trinity College Dublin where he was involved in student politics and graduated with a B.A. in political science in 2006.

== Career ==
McGuirk has worked in various public relations roles and as a communications manager for Declan Ganley's Rivada Networks. He also writes for the Irish Catholic. McGuirk has appeared as a guest on Irish broadcast media, including The Last Word and Tonight with Vincent Browne.

=== Gript Media ===
McGuirk began work as an editor of Gript Media, which describes its primary aim as supporting news and debate "without the liberal filter," in 2020. In April 2026, it was reported that Gript's major shareholder, Niamh Uí Bhriain, had put McGuirk on a leave of absence, beginning the previous month. McGuirk said that he remains an employee of Gript Media.

In May 2026, Gript confirmed that it had suspended McGuirk "pending an internal process concerning governance and related issues". McGuirk commented "For the avoidance of doubt, I reject the substance of the claim against me referred to by the company in its statement entirely and without equivocation". In May 2026, McGuirk resigned and accused Niamh Uí Bhriain of making him a "fall guy" for controversial editorial decisions, while Uí Bhriain indicated she was seeking legal advice on his claims.

Gript later published a statement on their website alleging that McGuirk had actually been suspended due to an "inappropriate relationship with a person he managed" along with a "complaint of sexual harassment" from another member of staff against him. In response, McGuirk released a video on his Twitter feed denouncing Gript's statement as "absurd" and rejecting all accusations of sexual harassment, asserting that it was made only after his own legal team had written to Gript to inform them their reasons for suspending McGuirk were unlawful.

=== Political career ===
McGuirk was a member of Ógra Fianna Fáil, of which he was national policy coordinator before resigning after a meeting at Fianna Fáil headquarters following leaking of e-mails in August 2003. He subsequently joined Fine Gael but resigned in 2007 after issues around a press release criticising the party leader with regard to Crumlin Children's Hospital; he later rejoined, then left again.

McGuirk was elected unopposed as Eastern Area Officer of the Union of Students in Ireland in 2006. The following year, he unsuccessfully sought the position of president of the USI.

He was communications director for the Libertas Institute during its 2008 campaign against the twenty-eighth amendment of the constitution of Ireland. Turnout was 53.1% and the amendment was rejected by a 53.4% majority. McGuirk's involvement with Libertas continued through 2009, when the amendment was revised and approved by a 67.1% majority nationally with 59% turnout. When Libertas contested the 2009 European elections with three candidates, McGuirk issued a press release attacking the Simon Wiesanthal Centre without the approval of the relevant candidate, and later attacked the same candidate in strong personal terms in a Facebook post, before apologising.

In the 2011 Irish general election, McGuirk ran as the New Vision candidate for Cavan–Monaghan. He received 2.4% of first preferences and was eliminated on the second count.

He was spokesman for Save the 8th, a campaign from the Life Institute, which unsuccessfully campaigned against the thirty-sixth amendment of the constitution of Ireland to preserve a constitutional protection of the life of the unborn. During the campaign, McGuirk tweeted a photo of abortion-rights campaigners at a march in Dublin, who were carrying posters featuring the logo used by the British Union of Fascists in the 1930s. It later emerged that these posters had been handed out to marchers who did not recognise the symbol, by anti-abortion campaigners as part of what was described by the Sunday Times as "a dirty trick straight from Richard Nixon’s playbook". McGuirk also stated "If Dublin Central is 75% yes on the day (3-1), I will never take a political job again". 76.5% of votes cast in Dublin Central supported 'Yes', and the referendum was approved by 66.4% of voters nationally.

== Views and controversies ==
McGuirk has been criticised for his characterisation of opponents, such as stating that Colm O'Gorman, head of Amnesty International Ireland, was a "cretinous stain on the Irish national discourse who’ll say whatever Soros pays [him] to" and the description of an abortion-rights supporting TD, Kate O'Connell, as a "catty, spiteful, loathsome twit" after the TD shared screengrabs of misogynistic tweets from a member of the Fine Gael National Executive.

In January 2020, McGuirk defended Gript's link to the firm AggregateIQ, which had been found to have broken privacy laws during the Brexit campaign, and was also involved in profiling of Gript readers.

In the wake of violence at anti-lockdown and anti-vaccine protests by far-right groups in Dublin in February 2021, McGuirk defended those opposed to Ireland's pandemic measures.

In March 2021, RTÉ paid €20,000 to charities nominated by the socialist republican party Éirígí after McGuirk, on an episode of Prime Time, falsely linked the group to the killing of the journalist Lyra McKee in Derry in 2019. McGuirk later apologised on social media, saying, "I got my Republican groups mixed up badly in a slip of the tongue. It was of course Saoradh, not Eirigi [sic], who were connected to the murder of Lyra McKee. I want to apologise publicly to Eirigi [sic] for the error, and thank RTE [sic] for correcting it." He was criticised by McKee's partner, Sara Canning, who said, "It's bad enough seeing tons of generally right-wing people using Lyra's name as a stick to beat everyone from Nicola Sturgeon to Nancy Pelosi, and now John McGuirk using Lyra's murder, on national TV, & without having the facts straight?! Enraging."

In 2022, McGuirk sued Paddy Cosgrave for defamation for Tweets posted in December 2021. In 2025, McGuirk sued Irish Studio LLC for calling Gript and him "far-right" and the parties settled out of court which resulted in McGuirk receiving €20,000 in compensation as well as an apology stating the framing was "unfair".

In November 2023, Gript published an article that included details that allowed an individual to be wrongly accused on social media as a person of interest in the stabbing that happened hours before the 2023 Dublin riot. Gardaí described the article as 'highly inaccurate' and contacted Gript, who agreed to remove the article. In February 2024, lawyers acting on behalf of the wrongly accused man lodged papers with the Irish High Court to initiate legal action against Gript and McGuirk.

On 13 May 2025, McGuirk said that TD Ruth Coppinger was wrong to say Gript was responsible for how people reacted to her refusal to answer a question around deportations from them and stated, "If her declining to engage with us provokes a negative public reaction, that is a matter for deputy Coppinger".
