= Tim Brannigan =

Irish actor and journalist

- Born: 10 May 1966 (age 60); Belfast, Northern Ireland
- Occupation: Journalist

Tim Brannigan (born 10 May 1966) is an Irish author, journalist, broadcaster, and political activist.

== Upbringing ==
Brannigan was born in 1966 in Belfast, the son of a Northern Irish mother and a Ghanaian father. As a mixed-race child born out of an affair, social and racial attitudes at the time would not have allowed Brannigan's mother to bring him home. Instead, Brannigan's mother concocted a ruse, in which the doctor at the clinic in which he was born informed the Brannigan family that Tim had been a stillbirth. The second part of the ruse involved Brannigan being kept at an orphanage for a year before his birth mother "adopted" him on the pretence that he would be a replacement for the stillborn child. This pretence avoided any awkward questions about his conception and, growing up, Brannigan has stated the rest of his family genuinely believed in the ruse his mother had created.

== Involvement with the IRA ==
In July 1990 Brannigan graduated from Liverpool Polytechnic with a degree in politics. In October of that same year, Brannigan was arrested in Belfast for possession of guns and explosives that he was storing for the Provisional Irish Republican Army. Brannigan served his sentence in H-Block prison, amongst hundreds of other Irish Republican prisoners.

== Later life ==
In 2016 it was revealed that a movie would be made based on his book Where Are You Really From?.
