= John Jea =

American poet

- From his autobiography.
- Born: c. 1773; Akwa Akpa
- Died: unknown
- Occupations: Farmer; sailor; preacher
- Notable work: The Life, History, and Unparalleled Sufferings of John Jea, the African Preacher. (1811)
- Parents: Hambleton Robert Jea (father); Margaret Jea (mother)

John Jea (1773 – after 1817) was an African-American writer, preacher, abolitionist and sailor, best known for his 1811 autobiography The Life, History, and Unparalleled Sufferings of John Jea, the African Preacher. Jea was enslaved from a young age, and after regaining his freedom in the 1790s, he traveled and preached widely.

== Early life ==
Little is known about John Jea's life apart from what he wrote in his autobiography, The Life, History, and Unparalleled Sufferings of John Jea, the African Preacher (1811).

Jea stated that he was born in Africa in 1773 near Calabar in the Bight of Biafra, and that he and his parents, Hambleton Robert Jea and Margaret Jea, and siblings were kidnapped by slave traders and sold into slavery in New York City when he was two and a half years old. Some historians have expressed doubts over these claims (the likelihood of an entire African family managing to survive capture and the high death rate of the Middle Passage, then to be sold collectively to a single owner, is extremely low), and suggested that they may have been fabricated or embellished.

Jea was purchased and held by a Dutch couple, Oliver and Angelika Triebuen. His masters were members of the conservative Dutch Reform Church, which were against converting enslaved people to Christianity around the time they bought Jea. His master initially sent him to church services as a punishment, but Jea became a devout Christian and was baptized in the 1780s.

Prior to his conversion, Jea harbored hatred for Christianity. He associated the religion with the violence of his master, for his master viewed himself as a pious man yet was capable of cruelty, which illustrates the oxymoronic nature of a Christian slave holder. His hatred was so deep that he would rather "[receive] an hundred lashes."

However, the "salvation rhetoric" chanted by the minister enchanted him and led to his newfound passion for Christianity. With greater knowledge on the religion, Jea made his own connections of the hypocrisy of his Christian slave master through finding scriptures that opposes his master's ideology. For example, his master quoted from the Bible "bless the rod, and him that hath appointed it," as the reason why the enslaved people should thank him for their punishment. In retaliation, Jea quoted the Bible within his narrative about how "God is love, and whoso dwelleth in love dwelleth in God" as a query to his master's cruelty.

During Jea's teenage years when he had acquired a new passion for Christianity, his master told him that enslaved people have no souls and that he would die "like the beasts that perish," although he was "treated worse than a beast of burden." However, Jea refuted his master's claim by referencing the Bible his master interpreted for his usage. Alongside renouncement of his master's claims, Jea thanked God for his meals, despite his master's attempt of proclaiming himself as God and be the one thanked. Moreover, Jea declared that he will be guided by none other than God.

== Freedom ==
After passing through a series of slave owners, Jea convinced the final one that his recalcitrance as a slave merited manumission. He was freed on the basis of being a faithful, baptized Christian though his enslaver initially refused to heed to the court order. Beforehand, his former enslaver tried to convince Jea to continue working under him because the Bible told him that Jea is to remain as his slave. Jea put the book up to his ear and tried to hear the book talk, but he could not hear a word. Thus, Jea fervently prayed within his room for the next six weeks. One night, the room illuminated with light, and an angel and the Holy Bible was beside him. He claimed that the book spoke to him telling him that it will teach him how to read the Holy Bible in both English and Dutch. Jea's faithfulness was backed by his ability to read the first chapter of The Gospel of John, along with the magistrates response of how "no man could read in such a manner, unless he was taught of God."

Jea believed that his conversion equated to his freedom, however "the magistrates only validated his baptism and conversion." Alongside the fear of Jea teaching other enslaved people about Christianity, came the threat of "[sharing] his newfound literacy with fellow [enslaved people]," giving reason to his emancipation. Through the true reason behind his emancipation, Jea demonstrated how literacy is a key component to freedom.

== Later life and travels ==
Jea tried persuading his family to seek freedom much like how he sought his. However, he was unable to successfully accomplish this task and instead gave ministries to an enslaved person and recounted his tale of Christianity to freedom, which resulted in the enslaved person obtaining his freedom much like Jea. Jea saw this as a sign from God to continue being a minister.

In the 1790s Jea traveled to Boston, New Orleans, New Jersey, South America, and various European countries, where he worked as an itinerant preacher and as a mariner and shipboard cook. During the beginnings as an itinerant preacher, he went from place to place professing the word of God. He did this through an organized manner where he and other preachers made rotations for each week. After three years in Boston, Jea returned to New York to see his mother, siblings, friends. While he was in New York, he had decided to marry a Native American Woman called Elizabeth, who he said had been executed for killing their child. Instead of attributing these murders to the authoritarian pressures inflicted on Elizabeth by her boss because of her husband's "intense piety," Jea saw "temptation and sin" as the root cause. He then married a Maltese woman named Charity who later died.

Between 1801 and 1805 he lived and preached in Liverpool, England. Jea initially made use of a methodist style of preaching during his itinerancy. Jea was wary of including antislavery sentiments for fear of the violence that might be invoked from pro-slavery lobbyists. He then worked as a cook on ships traveling around North America, the East and West Indies, South America, and Ireland. Although he worked for financial means, he also used his travels as an opportunity to preach the gospel.

During his stay in Europe in the 1810s, Jea published his autobiography and hymnbook, and married an Irishwoman named Mary. They had plans of traveling together and participating in a Methodist mission trip to Nova Scotia. However, Mary became ill and had to stay behind when they arrived at Portsmouth. Mary died shortly after the publication of Jea's narrative.

In the year 1811, Jea's travels reached a pause when his ship was captured by French forces. There was an opportunity to leave this imprisoned state by joining the American consul, however, Jea's pacifist nature deterred him. He decided against working on a US warship and preaching the gospel there because it clashes with his Christian ideologies. Jea traveled around northern France for four years before his eventual release at the close of the Napoleonic Wars. From Hodges' knowledge, Jea failed to compromise to participating in the war, which he described as sinful, and returned to England where he settled in Portsea around 1815.

Later, Jea married his fourth wife Jemima Davis in 1816 and had a child named Hephazabah, who was later baptized in an Anglican chapel. Hanley speculates that Jea had his daughter baptized in an Anglican chapel, despite the numerous Methodist churches nearby, because he was in a rush to attend the Grand-Parade’ located in St. Helier, Jersey. Not much is known about his death.

== Published works ==
Jea was one of the first African-American poets to have written an autobiography. His autobiography was written in Portsea between 1815 and 1816, but was largely unknown until it was rediscovered in 1983.

Henry Louis Gates Jr. argues that Jea's autobiography forms a "missing link" between 18th-century slave narratives, which tended to focus on spiritual redemption, and later 19th-century narratives, which rhetorically championed the political cause of abolition. Religious themes dominate Jea's autobiography. Indeed, Jea describes his acquisition of literacy as the result of a miraculous visit from an angel, who teaches him to read the Gospel of John. But political themes are mixed together with these religious aspects, and the work consistently argues that slavery is a fundamental injustice in need of abolition. Gates calls Jea's work "the last of the great black ‘sacred’ slave autobiographies."

Jea's narrative draws upon Biblical allusions and aligns with Henry Louis Gates' "talking book" trope, which appeared in many early slave narratives. Within this trope, the formerly enslaved person would be able to hear God's words originating from the Bible, as if the book was talking to them. This trope can be identified in the narrative when Jea acquired his literacy after praying for six weeks after his master and mistress admonished him for his baptism. However, this trope faced a decline as a more "secular context" began to be encourage to establish the narratives' credibility.

Jea also published a hymnbook called A Collection of Hymns. Compiled and Selected by John Jea, African Preacher of the Gospel (1816). It contains 334 songs, including 29 apparently of Jea's own composition.

Throughout his narrative, hymns, and sermons Jea made allusions to Lazarus. Before one of Jea's congregations, an English preacher-man aimed to insult Jea by comparing him to Lazarus, specifically the biblical figures' poor conditions prior to his death. Pierce relates Lazarus's death to Jea's former condition of being "dead in his sins." Parallels between Lazarus, a poor man unbeknown by much of society, and Jea, who was formerly enslaved and resentful of Christianity, contributed to his own understanding that even the most abject can gain passage to "salvation and eternal life" by God.

On one of Jea's trips across the Atlantic ocean, there came a turbulent storm that led to two men being struck to death by lightning. Jea described their deaths as a result of their blasphemy. They ridiculed Jea for his praying and threatened to throw him overboard. As both were abused by their shipmates and prayed for calmer waters, parallels were drawn between Jea and Jonah from the Bible. However, a sharp contrast between the two is that Jonah tried to disobey God, whereas Jea obeyed Him and sought to preach in England as directed. In the same event, Pierce made parallels between Elisha and Jea because of how those around them faced God's punishment for their taunts on the works of Christ. In Elisha's story, who is known to be a prophet of God, he was mocked for his baldness, and subsequently, those forty-two children who mocked him were mauled by two bears. Similarly, the two shipmates who mocked Jea for praying were promptly sent to their deaths.

After Jea's conversion, his narrative shifts from a view of his everyday life to a compilation of "mini-sermons" that he connects with himself, and calls this new semantic/syntax Canaan.

At the end of his narrative, Jea stated that he did not write this narrative, however, he made sure that it accurately depicted his life and allowed no alterations by the printers.
