= Maitiú Ó Tuathail =

Irish physician

- Occupation: Doctor

Maitiú Gearóid Ó Tuathail (born 1988 or 1989) is an Irish physician and former president of the National Association of General Practitioners.

== Background ==
Ó Tuathail grew up in Lettermore, County Galway. He earned his medical degree from NUI Galway in 2011. He qualified as a general practitioner in 2018. He became a Member of the Royal College of Physicians of Ireland (MRCPI) in 2015. In 2018, he became a Member of the Irish College of General Practitioners (MICGP) and a Member of the Faculty of Sports and Exercise Medicine (MFSEM) at the Royal College of Surgeons in Ireland (RCSI). In 2019, he graduated with a Master of Science in healthcare management from RCSI.

== Career ==
Ó Tuathail works as a general practitioner in Ranelagh. In 2017, he served as a lead NCHD. In 2018, he was elected president of the National Association of General Practitioners (NAGP) at the age of 29. He resigned from the NAGP in April 2019.

In November 2020, Ó Tuathail settled a High Court action he had taken against entrepreneur Paddy Cosgrave. The defamation case arose from remarks Cosgrave made about Ó Tuathail on the social media platform Twitter in April 2020. Cosgrave deleted the comments and issued a public apology.

As of 2026, Ó Tuathail works as a GP on the island of Jersey.

== Personal life ==
Ó Tuathail is openly gay.
