= Britain's Next Top Model series 10 =

Britain's Next Top Model
- Season 10
- Judges: Abbey Clancy; Hilary Alexander; Nicky Johnston; Paul Sculfor
- No. of contestants: 12
- Winner: Chloe Keenan
- No. of episodes: 10

Release
- Original network: Lifetime
- Original release: 14 January – 17 March 2016

Season chronology
- ← Previous; Cycle 9 (on Sky Living) Next → Cycle 11

The tenth cycle of Britain's Next Top Model premiered on 14 January 2016 on Lifetime. This was the first cycle of the series to air on the network after the show was cancelled in 2013 during its original run on Sky Living from 2005 to 2013. The title of the show was changed back from Britain & Ireland's Next Top Model to Britain's Next Top Model due to licensing issues, although contestants from Ireland were still allowed to apply for the show.

The new cycle featured a completely revamped panel of judges. Former host Elle Macpherson was replaced by cycle 2 runner-up and model Abbey Clancy. The remaining panel of judges consisted of male model Paul Sculfor, fashion photographer Nicky Johnston, and OBE fashion director and journalist Hilary Alexander. Clancy was the second Top Model alum to become a host of a national franchise, after Germany's Lena Gercke became the host of Austria's Next Topmodel in 2009.

The prizes for this cycle included a modelling contract with Models 1, a fashion spread in Cosmopolitan magazine, a nation-wide advertising campaign for Head & Shoulders as well as an additional campaign for Sleek Makeup along with a yearly supply of the brand's products, an appearance on The Clothes Show catwalk, and an all-expenses paid holiday trip to Barbados courtesy of Sandals Resorts.

The winner of the competition was 22-year-old Chloe Keenan from Birmingham. Keenan, who is originally from Conwy, is the first Welsh winner of the franchise.

== Cast ==
=== Contestants ===
(Ages stated are at start of contest)

Contestant	Age	Height	Hometown	Finish	Place
Jasmine Hodge	18	1.78 m (5 ft 10 in)	Hampshire, England	Episode 2	12
Amreen Akhtar	22	1.78 m (5 ft 10 in)	Yorkshire, England	Episode 3	11 (quit)
Alex Needham	22	1.75 m (5 ft 9 in)	Sheffield, England	Episode 4	10
Jenna McMahon	19	1.73 m (5 ft 8 in)	Liverpool, England	Episode 5	9
Megan Brunell	21	1.75 m (5 ft 9 in)	Blackwood, Wales	Episode 6	8-7
Georgia Butler	19	1.75 m (5 ft 9 in)	Norwich, England	Episode 6	8-7
Billie Downes	21	1.78 m (5 ft 10 in)	London, England	Episode 7	6
Alex 'Lexi' Kelly	19	1.75 m (5 ft 9 in)	Walsall, England	Episode 8	5
Bethan Sowerby	19	1.74 m (5 ft 8 1/2 in)	Oldham, England	Episode 9	4
Jessica Workman	20	1.83 m (6 ft 0 in)	Chester, England	Episode 10	3-2
Angel Cole	19	1.75 m (5 ft 9 in)	London, England	Episode 10	3-2
Chloe Keenan	22	1.80 m (5 ft 11 in)	Birmingham, England	Episode 10	1

=== Judges ===
- Abbey Clancy (host)
- Hilary Alexander
- Nicky Johnston
- Paul Sculfor

== Episodes ==
No. overall	No. in season	Title	Original release date
109	1	"Episode 1"	14 January 2016
The 15 chosen semi-finalists arrived at Cosmopolitan FashFest, where they were fitted and prepared to walk in a fashion show in front of an audience of 900 people. At the end of the week the models met judge Paul Sculfor, who revealed the names of the 12 contestants who would be moving on in the competition. At the end of the episode the finalists moved into their penthouse at Athenæum Hotel in Central London.: Special guests: Sairey Stemp, Lindsey Hunt, Lucy Jackson, Farrah Storr, Jeremy Hopkins
110	2	"Episode 2"	21 January 2016
The contestants met Cosmopolitan editor Farrah Storr at Brunswick Studios, and had a press conference challenge where they were interviewed by some of the United Kingdom's leading journalists. As the winner of the challenge, Chloe was invited to an exclusive cocktail party, and was allowed to take Angel, Jessica, and Jenna along with her. The models were later driven to the countryside to be photographed in an obstacle course photo shoot for Reebok, where they met host Abbey Clancy for the first time. At elimination, Bethan received picture of the week. Alex, Billie, and Jasmine landed in the bottom three, and Jasmine was eliminated from the competition.: Special guests: Farrah Storr, Olivia Heath, Steven Lange, Rhiannon Evans, Natalie Edwards, Ellie Carter-Silk; Featured photographer: Richard Allen
111	3	"Episode 3"	28 January 2016
The contestants arrived at a scrapyard for a photo shoot with judge and photographer Nicky Johnston featuring clothing from Les Éclaires' S/S 16 collection. They were later taken to a farm, and had to practice a choreographed routine for an appearance in a music video for the British country duo, The Shires. On set, Alex, Angel, Jenna, and Lexi were chosen as the best performers. All four girls were treated to a special dinner back at their hotel, while Angel was given tickets to see the duo during their tour. At elimination, Angel received picture of the week, while Amreen, Georgia, and Jenna landed in the bottom three. Amreen decided to leave the competition, and the other two contestants were allowed to stay.: Special guests: Gloria Dieth, Julian Koegel, Laura White, Rebecca Walker, The Shires; Featured photographer: Nicky Johnston
112	4	"Episode 4"	4 February 2016
The remaining 10 contestants received makeovers at the Sanrizz Hair academy, and had a black and white beauty shoot with Nicky Johnston. They later had to shoot a Hollywood glam TV commercial with a male model for Colgate's Max White Toothbrush and Whitening Pen. As the best performer, Georgia was chosen to be featured in a campaign for the brand's product. At elimination, Georgia also received picture of the week. Alex, Jessica, and Megan landed in the bottom three, and Alex was eliminated from the competition.: Special guests: Matthew Curtis, Ana Sanchez; Featured photographer: Nicky Johnston
113	5	"Episode 5"	11 February 2016
The contestants were flown to Croatia, where they met judge Hilary Alexander and found out that they would be walking in a presentation showcasing pieces from several Croatian designers. Megan was chosen as the best performer of the day. Nearing the end of their stay in Croatia, the models took on a photo shoot in Zagreb's Dolac Market wearing designs from the Hippy Garden label. They were later flown back to London for elimination, where Billie received picture of the week. Chloe, Jenna, and Lexi landed in the bottom three, and Jenna was eliminated from the competition.: Special guests: Sanda Sokol, Đurđica Vorkapić, Saša Momirović; Featured photographer: Nicky Johnston, Goran Matijašec
114	6	"Episode 6"	18 February 2016
Abbey Clancy visited the contestants in order to relieve tension in the house, and the models had a go-see challenge with urban street style label, Jaded London. Bethan was chosen as the winner of the challenge, and received a mermaid sequin bomber jacket from the designers. The contestants were later taken to Preston, and had a photo shoot for luxury wallpaper brand Graham & Brown wearing handcrafted dresses made out of wallpaper. The best performer would be featured on the cover of the brand's magazine, WhatWallsWant. At elimination, Lexi and Angel both received picture of the week, and were both chosen to have their photos run of the front and back covers of the magazine. Bethan, Georgia, and Megan landed in the bottom three, and the latter two left the competition in a double elimination.: Special guests: Grant goulden, Jade Goulden, Andrew Graham; Featured photographer: Sandi Hodkinson
115	7	"Episode 7"	25 February 2016
The contestants were taken to Boots pharmacy, and had a late night photo shoot for Head & Shoulders with a male model. The following day the models celebrated Bethan's 20th birthday, and had to shoot a promotional campaign for QVC under the judges' watchful eyes, where each model had to represent one of the retailer's various jewelry brands. On set the judges revealed that the elimination for that week would be taking place immediately after the shoot, and that the remaining five contestants at the end of the episode would be travelling to Jamaica. Chloe was chosen as the best performer, winning both the QVC challenge and picture of the week. Bethan and Billie landed in the bottom two, and Billie was eliminated from the competition.: Special guests: Matthew Curtis, Ben Cook, Chelsey Saunders; Featured photographer: Charlotte Kibbles; Featured director: Paul Burns
116	8	"Episode 8"	3 March 2016
The remaining five contestants arrived in Ocho Rios, where they settled into their new villa before being taken to Fisherman's Beach to take part in a challenge for Sandals Foundation, a charity operating in Caribbean communities. They then had to prepare motivational speeches which would have to be performed in front of a crowd of local schoolchildren. Bethan was chosen as the challenge winner, and was allowed to take Lexi on an outing to Mystic Mountain. The models later had a nude photo shoot with judge Nicky Johnston at River Bumpkin Farm. At elimination, Chloe received picture of the week. Bethan and Lexi landed in the bottom two, and Lexi was eliminated from the competition.: Special guests: O'Brian Heron, Karen Zacca; Featured photographer: Nicky Johnston
117	9	"Episode 9"	10 March 2016
The final four met reggae musician and chef Levi Roots, and had to shoot a mock TV commercial in which they had to deliver their lines whilst eating Spicy Jerk Chicken. Chloe was chosen as the best performer, winning an afternoon trip for two on a luxury catamaran, which she chose to share with Bethan. The models later had a swimwear photo shoot in the jungle for Radox's Feel Refreshed shower gels, where they each had to embody a different Radox fragrance. At elimination, Jessica received picture of the week. Angel and Bethan landed in the bottom two, and Bethan was eliminated from the competition, leaving Angel, Chloe, and Jessica as the three remaining finalists.: Special guests: Levi Roots, Nicola Comiskey
118	10	"Episode 10"	17 March 2016
The finalists took on their last photo shoot, where they had to model bridal gowns on the beach while the judges watched their performances. The contestants then prepared for their final task of the competition, which came in the form of a runway show at the Sandals Ochi Beach Club showcasing designs by top designers in Jamaica. At the end of the night the judges deliberated over each finalists' work and progress throughout the competition, and Chloe was crowned as the winner.: Special guests: Oliver Cargill; Featured photographer: Karis Kennedy

== Results ==
Order	Episode									
Order	1	2	3	4	5	6	7	8	9	10
1	Jenna	Bethan	Angel	Georgia	Billie	Angel; Lexi	Chloe	Chloe	Jessica	Chloe
2	Angel	Jessica	Megan	Lexi	Bethan	Angel; Lexi	Angel	Angel	Chloe	Angel; Jessica
3	Jessica	Megan	Chloe	Angel	Jessica	Jessica	Lexi	Jessica	Angel	Angel; Jessica
4	Chloe	Jenna	Bethan	Jenna	Angel	Chloe	Jessica	Bethan	Bethan	
5	Bethan	Lexi	Jessica	Bethan	Megan	Billie	Bethan	Lexi		
6	Billie	Angel	Lexi	Chloe	Georgia	Bethan	Billie			
7	Jasmine	Amreen	Alex	Billie	Chloe; Lexi	Georgia; Megan				
8	Georgia	Georgia	Billie	Jessica; Megan	Chloe; Lexi	Georgia; Megan				
9	Megan	Chloe	Georgia; Jenna	Jessica; Megan	Jenna					
10	Lexi	Alex; Billie	Georgia; Jenna	Alex						
11	Alex	Alex; Billie	Amreen							
12	Amreen	Jasmine								

The contestant was eliminated
The contestant quit the competition
The contestant won the competition

=== Bottom two/three ===
Episode	Contestants	Eliminated
2	Alex, Billie & Jasmine	Jasmine
3	Amreen, Georgia & Jenna	Amreen
4	Alex, Jessica & Megan	Alex
5	Chloe, Jenna & Lexi	Jenna
6	Bethan, Georgia & Megan	Georgia
6	Bethan, Georgia & Megan	Megan
7	Bethan & Billie	Billie
8	Bethan & Lexi	Lexi
9	Angel & Bethan	Bethan
10	Angel, Chloe & Jessica	Angel
10	Angel, Chloe & Jessica	Jessica

The contestant was eliminated after her first time in the bottom two/three
The contestant was eliminated after her second time in the bottom two/three
The contestant was eliminated after her fourth time in the bottom two/three
The contestant quit the competition
The contestant was eliminated in the final judging and placed as the runner-up

=== Average call-out order ===
Final two is not included.

Rank by average	Place	Model	Call-out total	Number of call-outs	Call-out average
1	2-3	Angel	22	8	2.75
2	2-3	Jessica	29	8	3.63
3	4	Bethan	31	8	3.88
4	1	Chloe	33	8	4.13
5	5	Lexi	29	7	4.14
6	7-8	Megan	25	5	5.00
7	6	Billie	37	6	6.17
8	9	Jenna	26	4	6.50
9	7-8	Georgia	33	5	6.60
10-11	10	Alex	27	3	9.00
10-11	11	Amreen	18	2	9.00
12	12	Jasmine	12	1	12.00

== Post–Top Model careers ==
- Jasmine Hodge did not pursue modeling after the show, but pursuing a career as a magazine's article writer for Clash.
- Amreen Akhtar did not pursue modeling after the show.
- Alex Needham has taken a couple of test shots and modeled for Elissa Poppy Latex Lingerie. She retired from modeling in 2017.
- Jenna McMahon signed with IMM Models, J’adore Models and C&C Models Agency in Istanbul. She has taken a couple of test shots and appeared on magazine cover and walked in fashion show for Salon Services UK. She has modeled for Cricket Fashion, Lipsy, JD Sports, Asos, Lee Stafford, Leigh Taylor Designs SS16, Goodwin Smith SS16, Miss G Couture, Ellesse FW17, Be Jealous Clothing UK, Glamoriser London, Qzen Eyewear Turkey, Urban Bliss UK, Divadames Clothing, Missy Empire, Wear All UK, Missi London, Rebellious Fashion, Lily Lulu Fashion, No Bra Clique,... McMahon retired from modeling in 2021.
- Georgia Butler signed with Leni's Model Management and Sandra Reynolds Model Agency. She has taken a couple of test shots and walked in fashion shows for Topshop. She has modeled for Colgate, YSL Beauty, Dipples Jewellers, Coral Eyewear, Tilley & Grace Womenswear, Urban Bliss UK, My Doris Jewellery SS23, Astrid & Miyu,... Beside modeling, Butler is also working as a model booker at Sandra Reynolds Model Agency. She retired from modeling in 2023.
- Megan Brunell signed with Dare Models, Unite Model Management and Frame Perfect - The Collective Agency. She has modeled for Bowen Dryden, Hooker & Young, Muse of London Salon,... and walked in fashion shows of L'Oreal, Wella, Hooker & Young, Milk Shake Hair UK, Goldwell, David Siero Hair,... She has taken a couple of test shots and appeared on magazine cover and editorials for Tribu-te Spring 2016, Hair's How Russia Summer 2016, Hairdressers Journal June 2016, Elléments US #9 Fall 2016, Estetica US #1303 August 2017, Style Guide October 2017, Estetica February 2019, Pro Beauty Loft #7 July-September 2019, Concept Hair Fall 2019,... Brunell retired from modeling in 2025.
- Billie Downes signed with Models 1, Bame Models Agency and IMM Models. She has taken a couple of test shots and appeared on magazine editorials for Pylot June 2016. She has modeled for Jimmy Choo, Chanel Joan Elkayam, Unicorn Cosmetics, HJ Lashes UK, Piferi Shoes FW22, Kandee Shoes,... Beside modeling, Downes is also appeared on the music video "Don Walk" by Rymez & Stefflon Don. She retired from modeling in 2024.
- Lexi Kelly signed with AS Agency, M&P Models, J’adore Models, BMA Models, Mentor Model Agency, RMG Model Agency, Morello Bookings Agency, Source Models and Pha Models Agency. She has appeared on magazine editorials for Elegant US July 2016, Dreamingless FW16, Elléments US August 2018, British Vogue November 2021,... and walked in fashion shows of L'Oreal, Giles Deacon SS18, Tiffany’s Bridal Dresses, Goddiva Fashion, Pritch London SS20, Isabel Manns,... She has taken a couple of test shots and modeled for Boohoo UK, Very, Revlon, Boots, In The Style UK, B-OnTrend UK, Francesco Hair Salon, Chanel Joan Elkayam, Misspap Clothing, Rosie Billington, Goldsworthy's Hairdressing, Narrow Arrow Clothing, Missy Empire, Code Beautiful, Rainbow Club UK, Holly Jayne Smith, All Neutrals UK, Ithaki Jewelry, Elizabeth Lucas Bridal, Sanyukta Shrestha, Nicola Anne Bridal,...
- Bethan Sowerby signed with J'Adore Models, Zone Models, Next Model Management in Miami, Link Models International in Miami Beach and Select Model Management in Stockholm. She has appeared on magazine cover and editorials for Voir Fashion #15 SS16, Reveal May 2016, House Of Solo January 2017, Elegant US #36 May 2017, Cosmopolitan November 2018, PSM Spain #10 September 2019, Creators Canada July 2020,... and walked in fashion shows of The Couture Club, Lounge Swimwear SS20, Orphic London Swimwear SS20, Oh Polly Fashion,... She has taken a couple of test shots and modeled for Footasylum, Pretty Little Thing, Remington US, JD Sports, Topshop, Missguided, Boux Avenue, George, H&M, Shein, Jack Wills, Novo London SS16, Spectrum Collections, In The Style UK, Abbott Lyon, B-OnTrend UK, Chanel Joan Elkayam, Goodwin Smith FW16, Sleek Makeup, Buckles 'n' Chains SS17, Be Jealous Clothing UK, Ellesse SS17, Souki Belair FW17, Nadine Merabi, Harper Rose Watches, Andi Bagus, With Love Lilly, Novmbr Swimwear, Rebellious Fashion, Forever Unique UK FW18, Outhebox Ladies SS19, The Couture Club, 304 Clothing Summer 2020, Va Va Voom Clothing Summer 2020, Just Hype, Kiht Collective, Beauty Bay, We Are We Wear, Tatti Lashes, Unique 21 UK, Ego UK, Pistol Panties, I Saw It First UK, Oh Polly Fashion, Flook The Label US, Tala UK, White Fox Boutique Australia,... Sowerby retired from modeling in 2025.
- Angel Cole signed with Zenith Model Management, Wari Lace Mother Agency and Isis Models in Lagos. She has appeared on magazine cover and editorials for Noctis, Spell January 2019, House Of Solo January 2019, New Wave October 2020, Deeds Nigeria March 2026, and modeled for Jasper Garvida SS17, Victor Wong Eyewear, Goldsworthy's Hairdressing, Ka Wa Key Chow FW19, Studio Pascale Eliza, Herbal Essentials Skincare, Paul Bert Clothing, Lace & Needles London, Frame Chain, Samson Soboye, Loci Wear, Karina Bond,... She has taken a couple of test shots and walked in fashion shows of Pam Hogg, Wella, On Off London SS17, Jasper Garvida SS17, Bao Ta London SS17, Fashion Canté, Precious Lulu Mahlangu, Muhire by Josiane Nsabimana, Ilé Móremí, Becca Atelier, Acephala SS20, Diligent by Szymon Mrózek SS20, Pat Guzik SS20, Daniele Bardis SS20, Never Fade Factory, Samson Soboye, Gary Pie, Sista by Eyoro, Mary Martin London, Tru Flair Bridal, Adebayo Jones, Abrantie The Gentleman, Piillz 'n Poizn, Hertunba by Florentina, Designs By Prelim, Sistas Felas, Enadia Igbin,... Beside modeling, Cole is also worked as a creative director and appeared in several music videos such as "Lazy Love" by Lost Girl ft. Ivorian Doll, "Proud Family" by Ghetts, "Take Time" by BackRoad Gee, "Eva & Mia" by Goko!, "Fashionista" by Cashh,...
- Jessica Workman signed with Industry Model Management. She has taken a couple of test shots and appeared on magazine editorials for Stories Collective September 2016. She has modeled for Kojo & Lee, Francesco Hair Salon,... and walked in fashion shows of Wella, Goldwell, Stephen Arthur UK,... Workman retired from modeling in 2018.
- Chloe Keenan has collected her prizes and signed with Models 1. She is also signed with Sapphires Model Management, 4 Walls Management and Pop Models in Milan. She has taken a couple of test shots and modeled for Head & Shoulders, Sleek Makeup SS16, Miss Bush Bridal, Suzie Turner Couture, Chanel Joan Elkayam, Clogau Jewellery, Contessina Lace Jewellery, Eliza Jane Howell, Savoy Hotel,... Keenan has walked in fashion shows of Tu Clothing, Fila, Masaba Gupta, Jayne Pierson, Bianca Von Stempel, Malan Breton SS17, Luke Anthony Rooney SS17, Pia Michi, Chanel Joan Elkayam FW17, Chantal Mallett Bridal Couture, Suzie Turner Couture, Jesús Peiró, Jasper Garvida SS18, Giles Deacon SS18, The House of Radha, Eliza Jane Howell,... and appeared on magazine cover and editorials for Bridal Buyer, Cosmopolitan April 2016, Jute US April 2016, Look May 2016, Notebook October 2016, Lucy's US #24 November 2016, The Telegraph February 2017, Eluxe France #11 March 2017, BA High Life March 2017, North Wales March 2018, Luxe Bride February 2019, Boyfriend March 2019,... Beside modeling, she is also pursuing an acting career.
