= Britain's Next Top Model series 12 =

Britain's Next Top Model
- Season 12
- Judges: Abbey Clancy; Cindy Bishop (Note: Cindy Bishop took over the shows hosting duties for episodes 8 and 9, which were filmed overseas in Thailand. Clancy resumed her role for the finale, which took place back in London.); Nicky Johnston; Max Rogers
- No. of contestants: 14
- Winner: Ivy Watson
- No. of episodes: 10

Release
- Original network: Lifetime
- Original release: 19 October – 21 December 2017

Season chronology
- ← Previous; Cycle 11

The twelfth and final cycle of Britain's Next Top Model premiered on 19 October 2017 on Lifetime. This was the third cycle of the series to be hosted by former contestant Abbey Clancy. Photographer Nicky Johnston returned for the new series as well. Previous judges Hilary Alexander and Paul Sculfor did not return. Sculfor was replaced by British male model Max Rogers, while Hilary Alexander's place at judging remained open for a guest judge each week. This cycle re-introduced individual critiques as elimination.

The prizes for this cycle included a modelling contract with Models 1, a fashion spread in Cosmopolitan magazine, nationwide campaigns for Show Beauty, Missguided, Cinere, and Lola Make Up along with a yearly supply of each brand's products, and a gift of portable electronic devices courtesy of Alcatel.

The winner of the competition was 22-year-old Ivy Watson from Lincoln, Lincolnshire. Watson was the first and only winner of the show to have never placed in the bottom two.

== Cast ==
=== Contestants ===
(Ages stated are at start of contest)

Contestant	Age	Height	Hometown	Finish	Place
Ocean Lane	19	1.73 m (5 ft 8 in)	Swindon, England	Episode 1	14-13
Gabriella Jukes	20	1.74 m (5 ft 8 1/2 in)	Port Talbot, Wales	Episode 1	14-13
Georgia Mason-Mottram	18	1.77 m (5 ft 9 1/2 in)	Surrey, England	Episode 2	12
Alisia Grant	19	1.78 m (5 ft 10 in)	Birmingham, England	Episode 3	11
Tamsin Hough	19	1.73 m (5 ft 8 in)	Cornwall, England	Episode 4	10
Efi Muntoni-Clements	21	1.80 m (5 ft 11 in)	London, England	Episode 5	9 (quit)
Shaunagh Slattery	21	1.70 m (5 ft 7 in)	Port Talbot, Wales	Episode 6	8
Louisa Northcote	20	1.75 m (5 ft 9 in)	London, England	Episode 6	7
Martha Miller	23	1.73 m (5 ft 8 in)	Brighton, England	Episode 7	6 (quit)
Cirrah Leah Webb	18	1.73 m (5 ft 8 in)	Manchester, England	Episode 8	5
Sophia Chawki	20	1.75 m (5 ft 9 in)	Essex, England	Episode 9	4
Kira MacLean	23	1.75 m (5 ft 9 in)	Nairn, Scotland	Episode 10	3-2
Eleanor Sippings	19	1.73 m (5 ft 8 in)	Colchester, England	Episode 10	3-2
Ivy Watson	22	1.78 m (5 ft 10 in)	Lincoln, England	Episode 10	1

=== Judges ===
- Abbey Clancy (host)
- Cindy Bishop (host)
- Nicky Johnston
- Max Rogers

== Episodes ==
No. overall	No. in season	Title	Original release date
129	1	"Episode 1"	19 October 2017
The semi-finalists arrived at a country manor in Chelmsford for a fairy tale themed boot camp, and met host Abbey Clancy for the first time. After changing into nude leotards to show off their catwalks and have one on one interviews with Clancy, the models were styled for a princess photo shoot with judge and photographer Nicky Johnston. On set, the contestants had to pose alongside judge Max Rogers. At the end of the week the models faced their first elimination, as the judges revealed that only 11 contestants would be moving into the model house. At the first elimination, Ocean and Gabriella were the first to leave.: Special guests: Paul Edmonds, Lee Pycroft; Featured photographer: Nicky Johnston
130	2	"Episode 2"	26 October 2017
The contestants moved into the model home, and learned that former contestant Eleanor Sippings would be joining them in the competition after having had to drop out from her original cycle due to an eye injury. On set, the models were introduced to designer Savannah Miller, and had a lookbook photo shoot showcasing a range of fall-winter accessories for Debenhams. They later had to practice their runway walks in a Kinky Boots catwalk challenge at the Adelphi Theatre. Efi was chosen as the best performer, winning immunity from the upcoming elimination. At panel the judges were joined by designer and guest judge Giles Deacon, and Shaunagh received picture of the week. Georgia and Kira landed in the bottom two, and Georgia was eliminated from the competition.: Special guests: Savannah Miller, Robyn Bright, Dominic Tribuzio, Philip Town, Giles Deacon; Featured photographer: David Yeo
131	3	"Episode 3"	2 November 2017
The contestants arrived at Big Sky Studios and had a photo shoot for PETA, where they had to pose in a campaign regarding issues concerning the commercialized abuse of animals. They were later taken to the woods and had a challenge in which they had to film a nude commercial advertisement for Creative Nature Superfoods. Cirrah Leah was chosen as the best performer, winning immunity from the upcoming elimination. At panel, global PETA ambassador Lucy Watson was introduced as the week's guest judge, and Kira received picture of the week. Alisia and Sophia landed in the bottom two, and Alisia was eliminated from the competition.: Special guests: Dan Matthews, Julianne Ponan, Lucy Watson; Featured photographer: Ruth Rose; Featured director: Charlotte Taylor
132	4	"Episode 4"	9 November 2017
The remaining 10 contestants attended "beauty bootcamp" and received makeovers under the direction of professional beauty experts. The models were later taken to a studio and had a photo shoot for Ghost fragrances in which they were suspended in the air over a crescent moon. Each model was required to embody the essence of one of the brands two new scents, Whitelight or Deep Night. At panel, fashion designer Daniel Lismore was introduced as the week's guest judge, and Kira received picture of the week. Eleanor and Tamsin landed in the bottom two, and Tamsin was eliminated from the competition.: Special guests: Paul Edmunds, Lee Pycroft, Bennett Connelly, Louise Rigley, Daniel Lismore; Featured photographer: Alex Beer
133	5	"Episode 5"	16 November 2017
Efi disclosed to the other contestants that she had been diagnosed with depression some time prior to the competition, and was taking medication to cope with her condition. The models took part in a photo shoot for Spectrum Collections makeup brushes in which they had to pose as life-size dolls. On set, Efi decided to quit the competition. The remaining eight contestants later had a challenge at the Bridge Academy in which they had to coach child models for a press event featuring clothing from Kimberley Walsh's Kimba collection. Eleanor was chosen as the best performer, winning immunity from the upcoming elimination. At panel, Cosmopolitan editor in chief Farrah Storr was introduced as the week's guest judge, and Martha received picture of the week. Cirrah Leah and Louisa landed in the bottom two, and were both allowed to remain in the competition due to Efi's decision to quit earlier that week.: Special guests: Hannah Pycroft, Sophie Pycroft, Kimberley Walsh, Farrah Storr; Featured photographer: Joseph Sinclair
134	6	"Episode 6"	23 November 2017
The contestants arrived at Dalston Heights and took part in a casting challenge to star in a digital marketing campaign for Tinder, which entailed creating personalized profiles to impress a panel of judges. Sophia was chosen as the best performer, winning immunity from the upcoming elimination. The models later had a photo shoot for Carmex lip balm with male model David Tausz in which they had to deliver a passionate kiss. Model and actress Kelly Brook was introduced as the week's guest judge at panel, where the contestants learned that a double elimination would be taking place. Ivy received picture of the week, while Louisa, Martha, and Shaunagh landed in the bottom three. The judges decided to save Martha, and the other two contestants were eliminated from the competition.: Special guests: Farrah Storr, Rosette Pambakian, Steve Bartlett, Oliver Proudlock, Stephanie Begin, David Tausz, Kelly Brook; Featured photographer: Catherine Harbour
135	7	"Episode 7"	30 November 2017
The contestants were taken to the Blok London fitness center, and took part in a paired challenge for Fitbit overseen by former Pussycat Doll Kimberly Wyatt in which they had to perform in a series of instructional exercise videos. As the winners of the challenge, Cirrah Leah and Eleanor had their video featured on the brand's social media platforms. The models also had a beauty photo shoot inside a bathtub for Lola Make Up's new matte lipstick collection, whilst the judges secretly watched their performance in a separate room. Abbey Clancy later paid the contestants a visit to reveal that the remaining five models at the end of the episode would be flown to Thailand for the remainder of the competition, and that Asia's Next Top Model's Cindy Bishop would be taking over the competition's hosting duties during their time abroad. At elimination, Karen Diamond, the agency director of Models 1, was introduced as the week's guest judge. Martha became ill during deliberation, and had to drop out of the competition per a doctor's advice due to her recurring fainting spells. As a result of the circumstances, no elimination took place.: Special guests: Kimberly Wyatt, Karen Mcadoo, Estrella Corral, Karen Diamond; Featured photographer: Fern Berresford
136	8	"Episode 8"	7 December 2017
The remaining five contestants were flown to Bangkok and moved into their new home at the Lebua State Tower. They later had a go-see challenge with designers from Asava, Vatanika and Crème de la Crème, and took part in a photo shoot with photographer Nat Prakobsantisuk overlooking the ancient city of Ayutthaya decked out in traditional Thai attire. The models were introduced to host Cindy Bishop for the first time at elimination, where designer Polpat Asavaprapha joined the panel as the week's guest judge. Eleanor and Kira were revealed to be the winners of the go-see challenge that had taken place earlier in the episode, and after deliberation, Ivy received picture of the week. Cirrah-Leah and Kira landed in the bottom two, and Cirrah-Leah was eliminated from the competition.: Special guests: Sven Brunssen, Victoria Sertic, Polpat Asavaprapha, Sirisak, Vatanika Patamasingh; Featured photographer: Nat Prakobsantisuk
137	9	"Episode 9"	14 December 2017
The remaining four contestants were asked to memorize lines from a script to perform in a bilingual Thai-English commercial for Thai Airways. Sophia was deemed as the best performer, and was allowed to bring Kira with her on a boat ride through the city. The models were later introduced to representatives from sportswear label Sixty Ninety, and had to perform in a photo shoot for the brand. Kira received picture of the week at elimination. Eleanor and Sophia landed in the bottom two, and Sophia was eliminated from the competition, leaving Eleanor, Ivy, and Kira as the three remaining finalists who would be flown back to London for the finale.: Special guests: Featured photographer: Olmo Reverter
138	10	"Episode 10"	21 December 2017
The finalists were sent to take part in a final photo shoot for Radox, where they each had to embody a different Radox fragrance as they were splashed with cold water. After the challenge, the models met host Abbey Clancy at the Mayfair Hotel, where she revealed to them that they would be taking part in a final catwalk show wearing designs by Giles Deacon during London Fashion Week Festival in front the press and important fashion A-listers. The final three later reunited with the previously eliminated contestants, as well as contestants from cycle's past. Immediately after the final show, the judges deliberated over each finalists' work and progress throughout the competition, and Ivy was crowned as the winner.: Special guests: Featured photographer:

== Results ==
Order	Episode									
Order	1	2 (Note: In episode 2, Eleanor entered the competition. She was originally a contestant on the show's previous cycle, but had to drop out of the competition after being diagnosed with a corneal ulcer. She was invited back by the show's producers to continue competing in this year's cycle.)	3	4 (Note: In episode 4, there was no immunity challenge. It was replaced by the makeover segment.)	5 (Note: In episode 5, Efi decided to quit the competition. Cirrah Leah and Louisa landed in the bottom two at panel, but were both allowed to remain in the competition due to Efi's decision to quit.)	6 (Note: In episode 6, Louisa, Martha, and Shaunagh landed in the bottom three. The final results were revealed in reverse order with Shaunagh placing 8th and Louisa placing 7th.)	7 (Note: In episode 7, Martha had to withdraw from the competition at panel due to health reasons. No elimination or call-out took place that week. The remaining five contestants at the end of the episode advanced collectively to the next round.)	8	9	10
1	Shaunagh	Shaunagh	Kira	Kira	Martha	Ivy	Cirrah Leah; Eleanor; Ivy; Kira; Sophia	Ivy	Kira	Ivy
2	Efi	Efi	Cirrah Leah	Martha	Eleanor	Sophia	Cirrah Leah; Eleanor; Ivy; Kira; Sophia	Eleanor	Ivy	Eleanor; Kira
3	Ivy	Ivy	Martha	Cirrah Leah	Kira	Cirrah Leah	Cirrah Leah; Eleanor; Ivy; Kira; Sophia	Sophia	Eleanor	Eleanor; Kira
4	Sophia	Louisa	Efi	Shaunagh	Shaunagh	Kira	Cirrah Leah; Eleanor; Ivy; Kira; Sophia	Kira	Sophia	
5	Cirrah Leah	Martha	Eleanor	Efi	Ivy	Eleanor	Cirrah Leah; Eleanor; Ivy; Kira; Sophia	Cirrah Leah		
6	Alisia	Cirrah Leah	Louisa	Louisa	Sophia	Martha	Martha			
7	Tamsin	Tamsin	Ivy	Sophia	Cirrah Leah; Louisa	Louisa				
8	Georgia	Alisia	Shaunagh	Ivy	Cirrah Leah; Louisa	Shaunagh				
9	Martha	Eleanor	Tamsin	Eleanor	Efi					
10	Louisa	Sophia	Sophia	Tamsin						
11	Kira	Kira	Alisia							
12	Gabriella; Ocean	Georgia								
13	Gabriella; Ocean									

The contestant was eliminated
The contestant was immune from elimination
The contestant quit the competition
The contestant was part of a non-elimination bottom two
The contestant won the competition

=== Bottom two/three ===
Episode	Contestants	Eliminated
1	Gabriella, Kira & Ocean	Gabriella & Ocean
2	Kira & Georgia	Georgia
3	Alisia & Sophia	Alisia
4	Eleanor & Tamsin	Tamsin
5	Cirrah-Leah & Louisa	Efi
6	Louisa, Martha & Shaunagh	Shaunagh
6	Louisa, Martha & Shaunagh	Louisa
7	—N/a	Martha
8	Cirrah-Leah & Kira	Cirrah-Leah
9	Eleanor & Sophia	Sophia
10	Eleanor, Ivy & Kira	Eleanor
10	Eleanor, Ivy & Kira	Kira

The contestant was eliminated after her first time in the bottom two/three
The contestant was eliminated after her second time in the bottom two/three
The contestant quit the competition
The contestant was eliminated in the final judging and placed as the runner-up

=== Average call-out order ===
Episode 7 & 10 is not included.

Rank by average	Place	Model	Call-out total	Number of call-outs	Call-out average
1	9	Efi	13	4	3.25
2	1	Ivy	30	8	3.75
3-4	6	Martha	26	6	4.33
3-4	8	Shaunagh	26	6	4.33
5	5	Cirrah-Leah	31	7	4.43
6	2-3	Kira	36	8	4.50
7	2-3	Eleanor	35	7	5.00
8	4	Sophia	46	8	5.75
9	7	Louisa	40	6	6.67
10	10	Tamsin	33	4	8.25
11	11	Alisia	25	3	8.33
12	12	Georgia	20	2	10.00
13-14	13-14	Gabriella	12	1	12.00
13-14	13-14	Ocean	12	1	12.00

== Makeovers ==
- Tamsin - Cut to shoulder length and dyed chestnut brown
- Efi - Cut short with bangs and dyed brown
- Louisa - Cut to chin length and dyed chocolate brown
- Shaunagh - Cut to chin length and dyed red
- Martha - Cut to shoulder length with light pink highlights
- Cirrah Leah - Volumized curls, dyed copper brown and eyebrows lightened
- Sophia - Dyed dark brown with bangs
- Eleanor - Cut to chin length and dyed light blonde
- Kira - Pixie cut and dyed brown
- Ivy - Cut to shoulder length and dyed platinum blonde
