= Dancing with the Stars (Irish TV series) series 2 =

Dancing with the Stars
- Series 2
- Presented by: Amanda Byram; Nicky Byrne
- Judges: Julian Benson; Loraine Barry; Brian Redmond; Darren Bennett (guest)
- Celebrity winner: Jake Carter
- Professional winner: Karen Byrne
- No. of episodes: 12

Release
- Original network: RTÉ One
- Original release: 7 January – 25 March 2018

Series chronology
- ← Previous; Series 1 Next → Series 3

Dancing with the Stars returned for a second series on 7 January 2018 on RTÉ One. Loraine Barry, Brian Redmond and Julian Benson returned to the judging panel for a second year, while Amanda Byram and Nicky Byrne also returned as hosts.

Sean Smullen did not return for this series, however all other professional dancers did. Sean was replaced by former Dancing with the Stars: Taniec z gwiazdami professional champion, Robert Rowiński.

The competition was won by Jake Carter alongside professional partner Karen Byrne.

On 25 March 2018, RTÉ announced that it would return for a third series in 2019.

== Couples ==
On 3 December 2017, it was confirmed that Deirdre O'Kane would compete in the series. On 4 December 2017, it was revealed on RTÉ 2fm's Breakfast Republic that host, Bernard O'Shea, was the latest celebrity to confirmed to be taking part. On 6 December 2017, in an interview with Ryan Tubridy on his breakfast show on RTÉ Radio 1, it was revealed that Maïa Dunphy would be taking part in the series. On 8 December 2017, Erin McGregor, Marty Morrissey and Norah Casey appeared on The Late Late Show confirming their participation, with the remaining five contestants being confirmed later in the show. On 20 December 2017, previously confirmed celebrity, Aoife Walsh, was forced to pull out of the show due to injury; she was replaced by Alannah Beirne.

Celebrity	Known for	Professional	Status
Norah Casey	Businesswoman	Curtis Pritchard	Eliminated 1st on 21 January 2018
Tomás O'Leary	Former rugby player	Giulia Dotta	Eliminated 2nd on 28 January 2018
Maïa Dunphy	Broadcaster & author	Robert Rowiński	Eliminated 3rd on 4 February 2018
Bernard O'Shea	Stand-up comedian	Valeria Milova; Karen Byrne (Week 6)	Eliminated 4th on 18 February 2018
Marty Morrissey	RTÉ Sport broadcaster	Ksenia Zsikhotska; Emily Barker (Week 6)	Eliminated 5th on 25 February 2018
Alannah Beirne	Britain's Next Top Model finalist	Vitali Kozmin; Kai Widdrington (Week 6)	Eliminated 6th on 4 March 2018
Rob Heffernan	Olympic race walker	Emily Barker; Ksenia Zsikhotska (Week 6)	Eliminated 7th on 11 March 2018
Erin McGregor	Fitness model	Ryan McShane; John Nolan (Week 6)	Eliminated 8th on 18 March 2018
Deirdre O'Kane	Stand-up comedian & actress	John Nolan; Vitali Kozmin (Week 6)	Runners-up on 25 March 2018
Anna Geary	Former Cork camogie player	Kai Widdrington; Ryan McShane (Week 6)	Runners-up on 25 March 2018
Jake Carter	Singer-songwriter	Karen Byrne; Valeria Milova (Week 6)	Winners on 25 March 2018

== Scoring chart ==
Couple	Place	1	2	3	1/2+3	4	5	6	7	6+7	8	9	10	11	12
Jake & Karen	1	19	—	21	40	24	27	24	26	50	28	27+30=57	30+5=35	26+25=51	30+28+30=88
Anna & Kai	2	—	21	18	39	27	22	22	30	52	22	24+25=49	29+4=33	24+30=54	28+30+30=88
Deirdre & John	2	—	18	19	37	25	19	26	20	46	24	26+30=56	22+1=23	27+22=49	29+29+27=85
Erin & Ryan	4	—	23	22	45	21	24	20	28	48	25	29+25=54	27+3=30	27+25=52	
Rob & Emily	5	17	—	18	35	20	25	16	21	37	18	24+25=49	25+2=27		
Alannah & Vitali	6	—	20	26	46	26	23	27	22	49	26	24+30=54			
Marty & Ksenia	7	12	—	8	20	15	12	14	16	30	16				
Bernard & Valeria	8	10	—	17	27	18	14	13	13	26					
Maïa & Robert	9	—	13	16	29	19	19								
Tomás & Giulia	10	17	—	22	39	16									
Norah & Curtis	11	—	15	17	32										

Red numbers indicate the couples with the lowest score for each week.
Green numbers indicate the couples with the highest score for each week.
the couple eliminated that week
the returning couple that was called forward and eventually last to be called safe, but was not necessarily in the bottom
the returning couple that finished in the bottom two and competed in the Dance-Off
the winning couple
the runner-up couple

=== Average chart ===
This table only counts for single dances scored on a traditional 30-points scale. It does not include the Team Dance or Marathon scores.

Rank by average	Place	Couple	Total points	Number of dances	Total average
1	1	Jake & Karen	365	14	26.07
2	2	Anna & Kai	355	14	25.36
3	4	Erin & Ryan	271	11	24.64
4	6	Alannah & Vitali	194	8	24.25
5	2	Deirdre & John	333	14	23.79
6	5	Rob & Emily	179	9	19.89
7	10	Tomás & Giulia	55	3	18.33
8	9	Maïa & Robert	67	4	16.75
9	11	Norah & Curtis	32	2	16.0
10	8	Bernard & Valeria	85	6	14.17
11	7	Marty & Ksenia	93	7	13.29

== Highest and lowest scoring performances ==
The highest and lowest performances in each dance according to the judges' scale are as follows.

Dance	Celebrity	Highest score	Celebrity	Lowest score
Tango	Anna Geary	28	Bernard O'Shea	10
Cha-cha-cha	Erin McGregor	25	Marty Morrissey	8
Salsa	Anna Geary	30	Bernard O'Shea	17
Foxtrot	Erin McGregor	24	Norah Casey	15
Charleston	Anna Geary; Jake Carter	30	Marty Morrissey	12
Waltz	Erin McGregor	29	Maïa Dunphy	16
Quickstep	Deirdre O'Kane	29	Marty Morrissey	12
Jive	Anna Geary	29	Marty Morrissey	14
Rumba	Jake Carter	26	Marty Morrissey	16
Paso Doble	Erin McGregor	28	Tomás O'Leary	16
American Smooth	Alannah Beirne; Deirdre O'Kane	26	Bernard O'Shea	14
Contemporary Ballroom	Jake Carter	30	Rob Heffernan	24
Samba	Erin McGregor	27	Anna Geary	18
Viennese Waltz	Jake Carter	28	Bernard O'Shea	13
Showdance	Jake Carter; Anna Geary	30	Deirdre O'Kane	27
Team Dance	Alannah Beirne; Deirdre O'Kane; Jake Carter	30	Anna Geary; Erin McGregor; Rob Heffernan	25
Swing-a-thon	Jake Carter	5	Deirdre O'Kane	1

== Couples' highest and lowest scoring dances ==
Couples	Highest scoring dance	Lowest scoring dance
Jake & Karen	Charleston; Contemporary Ballroom; Showdance (30)	Salsa (19)
Anna & Kai	Charleston; Salsa; Showdance (30)	Samba (18)
Deirdre & John	Charleston; Quickstep (29)	Jive (18)
Erin & Ryan	Waltz (29)	Quickstep (20)
Rob & Emily	Viennese Waltz; Foxtrot (25)	Quickstep (16)
Alannah & Vitali	Tango (27)	Waltz (20)
Marty & Ksenia	Foxtrot; Rumba (16)	Cha-cha-cha (8)
Bernard & Valeria	Paso Doble (18)	Tango (10)
Maïa & Robert	Rumba; Tango (19)	Cha-cha-cha (13)
Tomás & Giulia	Jive (22)	Paso Doble (16)
Norah & Curtis	Paso Doble (17)	Foxtrot (15)

== Weekly scores and songs ==
Unless indicated otherwise, individual judges scores in the charts below (given in parentheses) are listed in this order from left to right: Brian Redmond, Loraine Barry, Julian Benson.

=== Week 1 ===
Individual judges scores in the charts below (given in parentheses) are listed in this order from left to right: Brian Redmond, Loraine Barry, Darren Bennett.

Due to an illness, Darren Bennett filled in for Julian Benson.

Guest act: Series 1 champions, Aidan O'Mahony and Valeria Milova performing a Charleston to 'I Got a Woman'

Running order (Men)

Couple	Score	Dance	Music
Rob & Emily	17 (5, 6, 6)	Jive	"One Way or Another (Teenage Kicks)"—One Direction
Bernard & Valeria	10 (2, 4, 4)	Tango	"Video Killed the Radio Star"—The Buggles
Tomás & Giulia	17 (5, 6, 6)	Foxtrot	"All of Me"—John Legend
Jake & Karen	19 (6, 6, 7)	Salsa	"Reggaetón Lento (Remix)"—CNCO & Little Mix
Marty & Ksenia	12 (3, 4, 5)	Quickstep	"You're Such a Good Looking Woman"—Joe Dolan

=== Week 2 ===
Individual judges scores in the charts below (given in parentheses) are listed in this order from left to right: Brian Redmond, Loraine Barry, Darren Bennett.

Darren Bennett filled in for Julian Benson.

Guest act: Brendan Cole and Faye Huddleston performing a Rumba to 'Fields of Gold'

Running order (Women)

Couple	Score	Dance	Music
Anna & Kai	21 (6, 8, 7)	Tango	"Rebel Rebel"—David Bowie
Alannah & Vitali	20 (6, 7, 7)	Waltz	"Moon River"— Andrea Ross
Maïa & Robert	13 (4, 4, 5)	Cha-cha-cha	"Don't Be So Hard on Yourself"—Jess Glynne
Norah & Curtis	15 (5, 5, 5)	Foxtrot	"Nora"—Tara O'Grady
Erin & Ryan	23 (7, 8, 8)	Salsa	"Instruction"—Jax Jones feat. Demi Lovato & Stefflon Don
Deirdre & John	18 (6, 6, 6)	Jive	"Mayhem"—Imelda May

=== Week 3 ===
Julian Benson returned to the panel following a two-week absence.

Running order

Couple	Score	Dance	Music	Results
Deirdre & John	19 (6, 6, 7)	Tango	"I Drove All Night"—Roy Orbison and The Royal Philharmonic Orchestra	Safe
Tomás & Giulia	22 (7, 7, 8)	Jive	"Chasing Cars"—The Baseballs	Safe
Alannah & Vitali	26 (8, 9, 9)	Charleston	"Emergency"—Icona Pop	Safe
Maïa & Robert	16 (5, 5, 6)	Waltz	"See the Day"—Girls Aloud	Safe
Bernard & Valeria	17 (5, 6, 6)	Salsa	"He's the Greatest Dancer"—Sister Sledge	Safe
Anna & Kai	18 (6, 6, 6)	Samba	"New Rules"—Dua Lipa	Safe
Norah & Curtis	17 (5, 6, 6)	Paso Doble	"Señorita"—Bond	Eliminated
Jake & Karen	21 (7, 7, 7)	Quickstep	"Knee Deep in My Heart"—Shane Filan	Safe
Rob & Emily	18 (6, 6, 6)	Tango	"I'm Gonna Be (500 Miles)"—The Proclaimers	Last to be called safe
Marty & Ksenia	8 (2, 2, 4)	Cha-cha-cha	"I Got You (I Feel Good)"—James Brown	Last to be called safe
Erin & Ryan	22 (7, 7, 8)	Viennese Waltz	"You Don't Own Me"—Grace & G-Eazy	Safe

=== Week 4: Movie Week ===
Running order

Couple	Score	Dance	Music	Movie	Result
Erin & Ryan	21 (6, 7, 8)	Charleston	"Woo-Hoo"—The 5.6.7.8's	Kill Bill: Volume 1	Safe
Marty & Ksenia	15 (4, 5, 6)	American Smooth	"Pretty Irish Girl"—Brendan O'Dowda and Ruby Murray	Darby O'Gill and the Little People	Safe
Rob & Emily	20 (6, 7, 7)	Samba	"Jump in the Line (Shake, Señora)"—Harry Belafonte	Beetlejuice	Safe
Maïa & Robert	19 (6, 6, 7)	Rumba	"Up Where We Belong"—Joe Cocker and Jennifer Warnes	An Officer and a Gentleman	Last to be called safe
Tomás & Giulia	16 (5, 5, 6)	Paso Doble	"Immigrant Song"—Led Zeppelin	Thor: Ragnarok	Eliminated
Jake & Karen	24 (8, 8, 8)	Cha-cha-cha	"The Power of Love"—Huey Lewis and the News	Back to the Future	Safe
Anna & Kai	27 (9, 9, 9)	Contemporary Ballroom	"Let It Go"—Idina Menzel	Frozen	Safe
Deirdre & John	25 (8, 8, 9)	Quickstep	"Peppy and George"—Ernst Van Tiel & the Brussels Philharmonic	The Artist	Safe
Bernard & Valeria	18 (6, 6, 6)	Paso Doble	"He's a Pirate"—Klaus Badelt and Hans Zimmer	Pirates of the Caribbean	Last to be called safe
Alannah & Vitali	26 (8, 9, 9)	American Smooth	"City of Stars"—Ryan Gosling and Emma Stone	La La Land	Safe

=== Week 5 ===
Running order

Couple	Score	Dance	Music	Result
Anna & Kai	22 (7, 7, 8)	Paso Doble	"Titanium"—David Guetta feat. Sia	Last to be called safe
Bernard & Valeria	14 (4, 5, 5)	American Smooth	"Be Young, Be Foolish, Be Happy"—The Tams	Safe
Deirdre & John	19 (6, 6, 7)	Salsa	"La Vida Es Un Carnaval (Reggae/Latino Remix)"—Celia Cruz	Last to be called safe
Erin & Ryan	24 (8, 8, 8)	Foxtrot	"Feels Like Home"—Chantal Kreviazuk	Safe
Maïa & Robert	19 (6, 6, 7)	Tango	"Hernando's Hideaway"—Alma Cogan	Eliminated
Rob & Emily	25 (8, 8, 9)	Viennese Waltz	"Perfect"—Ed Sheeran	Safe
Alannah & Vitali	23 (8, 7, 8)	Cha-cha-cha	"Timber"—Pitbull feat. Kesha	Safe
Marty & Ksenia	12 (3, 4, 5)	Charleston	"We No Speak Americano"—Yolanda Be Cool & DCUP	Safe
Jake & Karen	27 (9, 9, 9)	Contemporary Ballroom	"Sign of the Times"—Harry Styles	Safe

=== Week 6: Switch-Up Week ===
Guest act: Gavin James performing 'Hearts On Fire'

Running order

Couple	Score	Dance	Music
Erin & John	20 (7, 6, 7)	Quickstep	"Life's About to Get Good"—Shania Twain
Marty & Emily	14 (4, 4, 6)	Jive	"Crocodile Rock"—Elton John
Anna & Ryan	22 (7, 7, 8)	Viennese Waltz	"Say You Love Me"—Jessie Ware
Bernard & Karen	13 (3, 5, 5)	Charleston	"Lollipop"—Mika
Jake & Valeria	24 (8, 8, 8)	Samba	"Mi Gente (Remix)"—J Balvin and Willy William
Deirdre & Vitali	26 (8, 9, 9)	American Smooth	"Wuthering Heights"—Kate Bush
Alannah & Kai	27 (9, 9, 9)	Tango	"Green Light"—Lorde
Rob & Ksenia	16 (5, 5, 6)	Quickstep	"L-O-V-E"—Gregory Porter

=== Week 7 ===
Running order

Couple	Score	Dance	Music	Result
Marty & Ksenia	16 (5, 5, 6)	Foxtrot	"Raindrops Keep Fallin' on My Head"—B. J. Thomas	Safe
Alannah & Vitali	22 (7, 7, 8)	Rumba	"Havana"—Camila Cabello feat. Young Thug	Safe
Deirdre & John	20 (7, 6, 7)	Waltz	"The Rainbow Connection"—Sarah McLachlan	Last to be called safe
Rob & Emily	21 (7, 7, 7)	Salsa	"Livin' la Vida Loca"—Ricky Martin	Safe
Bernard & Valeria	13 (4, 4, 5)	Viennese Waltz	"What's New Pussycat?"—Tom Jones	Eliminated
Erin & Ryan	28 (9, 9, 10)	Paso Doble	"Seven Nation Army"—The White Stripes	Bottom two
Jake & Karen	26 (8, 9, 9)	Tango	"La cumparsita"—Jose Basso	Safe
Anna & Kai	30 (10, 10, 10)	Charleston	"Bang Bang"—Will.i.am	Safe

Dance-Off

Judges' votes to save

- Benson: Erin & Ryan
- Redmond: Erin & Ryan
- Barry: Did not vote, but would have voted to save Erin & Ryan

=== Week 8: Guilty Pleasures Week ===
Running order

Couple	Score	Dance	Music	Result
Erin & Ryan	25 (8, 8, 9)	Cha-cha-cha	"It's Raining Men"—The Weather Girls	Safe
Marty & Ksenia	16 (5, 5, 6)	Rumba	"The Lady in Red"—Chris de Burgh	Eliminated
Alannah & Vitali	26 (8, 9, 9)	Quickstep	"I'll Be There for You"—The Rembrandts	Bottom two
Rob & Emily	18 (6, 6, 6)	Cha-cha-cha	"Ice Ice Baby"—Vanilla Ice	Safe
Anna & Kai	22 (7, 7, 8)	American Smooth	"Achy Breaky Heart"—Billy Ray Cyrus	Last to be called safe
Deirdre & John	24 (7, 8, 9)	Paso Doble	"Tragedy"—Steps	Safe
Jake & Karen	28 (9, 9, 10)	Viennese Waltz	"You'll Never Walk Alone"—Gerry and the Pacemakers	Safe

Dance-Off

Judges' votes to save

- Benson: Alannah & Vitali
- Redmond: Alannah & Vitali
- Barry: Did not vote, but would have voted to save Alannah & Vitali

=== Week 9: Team Dance Week ===
After each couple performed their individual dance, all six couples were separated into two teams to perform a team dance to earn a higher individual scores.

Running order

Couple	Score	Dance	Music	Result
Jake & Karen	27 (9, 9, 9)	Jive	"Rock Around the Clock (Swing Cats Remix)"—Bill Haley & His Comets	Safe
Rob & Emily	24 (8, 8, 8)	Contemporary Ballroom	"Hymn for the Weekend"—Coldplay feat. Beyoncé	Safe
Alannah & Vitali	24 (8, 8, 8)	Samba	"Lush Life"—Zara Larsson	Eliminated
Erin & Ryan	29 (9, 10, 10)	Waltz	"Kissing You"—Des'ree	Bottom two
Anna & Kai	24 (8, 8, 8)	Rumba	"Secret Love Song"—Little Mix feat. Jason Derulo	Safe
Deirdre & John	26 (8, 9, 9)	Charleston	"Sparkling Diamonds"—Nicole Kidman	Safe
Anna & Kai; Erin & Ryan; Rob & Emily	25 (8, 8, 9)	Freestyle ("Party Rockers")	"Party Rock Anthem"—LMFAO feat. GoonRock and Lauren Bennett	
Alannah & Vitali; Deirdre & John; Jake & Karen	30 (10, 10, 10)	Freestyle ("Floor Fillers")	"On the Floor"—Jennifer Lopez and Pitbull	

Dance-Off

Judges' votes to save

- Benson: Erin & Ryan
- Redmond: Erin & Ryan
- Barry: Did not vote, but would have voted to save Erin & Ryan

=== Week 10: Broadway Week ===
Guest act: Joanne Clifton and the cast of Flashdance the Musical performing a routine to 'Flashdance... What a Feeling'

Running order

Couple	Score	Dance	Music	Musical	Result
Rob & Emily	25 (8, 8, 9)	Foxtrot	"Any Dream Will Do" — Donny Osmond	Joseph and the Amazing Technicolor Dreamcoat	Eliminated
Erin & Ryan	27 (9, 9, 9)	Tango	"Cell Block Tango" — The cast of Chicago	Chicago	Bottom two
Anna & Kai	29 (9, 10, 10)	Jive	"Time Warp" — The cast of Glee	The Rocky Horror Show	Safe
Deirdre & John	22 (7, 7, 8)	Foxtrot	"One" — The cast of A Chorus Line	A Chorus Line	Safe
Jake & Karen	30 (10, 10, 10)	Charleston	"Friend Like Me" — Robin Williams	Aladdin	Safe
Deirdre & John; Rob & Emily; Erin & Ryan; Anna & Kai; Jake & Karen	1; 2; 3; 4; 5	Swing-a-thon	"You Can't Stop the Beat" — The cast of Hairspray	Hairspray	

Dance-Off

Judges' votes to save

- Benson: Erin & Ryan
- Redmond: Erin & Ryan
- Barry: Did not vote, but would have voted to save Erin & Ryan

=== Week 11: Semifinal ===
Guest act: Riverdance collaboration with the Dancing with the Stars professional dancers.

The couples will perform two dances, the first being a song by an Irish artist to celebrate Saint Patrick's Day

Running order

Couples	Score	Dance	Music	Result
Erin & Ryan	27 (9, 9, 9)	Samba	"Rain"—The Script	Eliminated
Erin & Ryan	25 (8, 8, 9)	Contemporary Ballroom	"Alive"—Sia	Eliminated
Deirdre & John	27 (9, 9, 9)	Contemporary Ballroom	"Zombie"—The Cranberries	Safe
Deirdre & John	22 (7, 7, 8)	Cha-cha-cha	"Can You Feel It"—The Jacksons	Safe
Anna & Kai	24 (8, 8, 8)	Foxtrot	"Dancin' in the Moonlight (It's Caught Me in Its Spotlight)"—Thin Lizzy	Safe
Anna & Kai	30 (10, 10, 10)	Salsa	"Don't Stop the Music"—Rihanna	Safe
Jake & Karen	26 (9, 8, 9)	Rumba	"Slow Hands"—Niall Horan	Bottom two
Jake & Karen	25 (8, 8, 9)	American Smooth	"Let's Face the Music and Dance"—Seth MacFarlane	Bottom two

Dance-Off
For the dance-off Jake & Karen chose to perform their Rumba, while Erin & Ryan chose their Samba.

Judges’ votes to save

- Benson: Jake & Karen
- Redmond: Erin & Ryan
- Barry: Jake & Karen

=== Week 12: The Final ===
Guest act: Picture This performing 'This Morning'.

Running order

Couples	Score	Dance	Music	Result
Deirdre & John	29 (9, 10, 10)	Charleston	"Sparkling Diamonds" — Nicole Kidman	Runner-up
Deirdre & John	29 (10, 9, 10)	Quickstep	"Peppy and George"—Ernst Van Tiel & the Brussels Philharmonic	Runner-up
Deirdre & John	27 (9, 9, 9)	Showdance	"Let Me Entertain You" — Robbie Williams	Runner-up
Jake & Karen	30 (10, 10, 10)	Contemporary Ballroom	"Sign of the Times" — Harry Styles	Winner
Jake & Karen	28 (9, 9, 10)	Jive	"Rock Around the Clock (Swing Cats Remix)" — Bill Haley & His Comets	Winner
Jake & Karen	30 (10, 10, 10)	Showdance	"Mad World" — Hardwell feat. Jake Reese	Winner
Anna & Kai	28 (9, 10, 9)	Tango	"Rebel Rebel" — David Bowie	Runner-up
Anna & Kai	30 (10, 10, 10)	Charleston	"Bang Bang" — will.i.am	Runner-up
Anna & Kai	30 (10, 10, 10)	Showdance	"This Is Me" — Keala Settle	Runner-up

== Dance chart ==
Highest scoring dance
Lowest scoring dance
No dance performed

Couple	Week 1	Week 2	Week 3	Week 4	Week 5	Week 6	Week 7	Week 8	Week 9		Week 10		Week 11		Week 12		
Jake & Karen	Salsa	N/A	Quickstep	Cha-cha-cha	Contemporary Ballroom	Samba (with Valeria)	Tango	Viennese Waltz	Jive	Freestyle (Team Floor Fillers)	Charleston	Swing-a-thon	Rumba	American Smooth	Contemporary Ballroom	Jive	Showdance
Anna & Kai	N/A	Tango	Samba	Contemporary Ballroom	Paso Doble	Viennese Waltz (with Ryan)	Charleston	American Smooth	Rumba	Freestyle (Team Party Rockers)	Jive	Swing-a-thon	Foxtrot	Salsa	Tango	Charleston	Showdance
Deirdre & John	N/A	Jive	Tango	Quickstep	Salsa	American Smooth (with Vitali)	Waltz	Paso Doble	Charleston	Freestyle (Team Floor Fillers)	Foxtrot	Swing-a-thon	Contemporary Ballroom	Cha-cha-cha	Charleston	Quickstep	Showdance
Erin & Ryan	N/A	Salsa	Viennese Waltz	Charleston	Foxtrot	Quickstep (with John)	Paso Doble	Cha-cha-cha	Waltz	Freestyle (Team Party Rockers)	Tango	Swing-a-thon	Samba	Contemporary Ballroom			
Rob & Emily	Jive	N/A	Tango	Samba	Viennese Waltz	Quickstep (with Ksenia)	Salsa	Cha-cha-cha	Contemporary Ballroom	Freestyle (Team Party Rockers)	Foxtrot	Swing-a-thon					
Alannah & Vitali	N/A	Waltz	Charleston	American Smooth	Cha-cha-cha	Tango (with Kai)	Rumba	Quickstep	Samba	Freestyle (Team Floor Fillers)							
Marty & Ksenia	Quickstep	N/A	Cha-cha-cha	American Smooth	Charleston	Jive (with Emily)	Foxtrot	Rumba									
Bernard & Valeria	Tango	N/A	Salsa	Paso Doble	American Smooth	Charleston (with Karen)	Viennese Waltz										
Maïa & Robert	N/A	Cha-cha-cha	Waltz	Rumba	Tango												
Tomás & Giulia	Foxtrot	N/A	Jive	Paso Doble													
Norah & Curtis	N/A	Foxtrot	Paso Doble														
