= Britain's Next Top Model series 11 =

Britain's Next Top Model
- Season 11
- Judges: Abbey Clancy; Hilary Alexander; Nicky Johnston; Paul Sculfor
- No. of contestants: 12
- Winner: Olivia Wardell
- No. of episodes: 10

Release
- Original network: Lifetime
- Original release: 16 March – 18 May 2017

Season chronology
- ← Previous; Cycle 10 Next → Cycle 12

The eleventh cycle of Britain's Next Top Model premiered on 16 March 2017 on Lifetime. The judging panel from the show's previous cycle remained unchanged. This cycle introduced challenges in which contestants could be granted immunity during their weekly eliminations. 22 year-old Talulah-Eve Brown made history in the series after being the first openly transgender contestant to compete on the show.

The prizes for this cycle included a modelling contract with Models 1, a fashion spread in Cosmopolitan magazine, nation-wide advertising campaigns for Sleek Makeup and Paul Edmonds along with a yearly supply of both brand's products, as well as additional campaigns for Colgate, Dorothy Perkins, and boohoo.

The winner of the competition was 18-year-old Olivia Wardell from Romsey, Hampshire.

== Cast ==
=== Contestants ===
(Ages stated are at start of contest)

Contestant	Age	Height	Hometown	Finish	Place
Anastasia Ellis	20	1.79 m (5 ft 10 1/2 in)	Crewe, England	Episode 2	12
Abby Heaton	19	1.73 m (5 ft 8 in)	Manchester, England	Episode 3	11
Victoria Clay	23	1.79 m (5 ft 10 1/2 in)	Liverpool, England	Episode 4	10
Eleanor Sippings	18	1.73 m (5 ft 8 in)	Colchester, England	Episode 5	9 (quit)
Talulah-Eve Brown	22	1.74 m (5 ft 8 1/2 in)	Birmingham, England	Episode 5	8
Bianca Thomas	22	1.76 m (5 ft 9 1/2 in)	Lowestoft, England	Episode 6	7
Chloe Lockley-Middleton	20	1.75 m (5 ft 9 in)	Huddersfield, England	Episode 7	6
Simone Murphy	22	1.79 m (5 ft 10 1/2 in)	Edinburgh, Scotland	Episode 8	5
Tallulah Steed-Fassett	19	1.74 m (5 ft 8 1/2 in)	London, England	Episode 9	4
Alannah Beirne	22	1.83 m (6 ft 0 in)	Naas, Republic of Ireland	Episode 10	3
Jennifer Malengele	18	1.73 m (5 ft 8 in)	London, England	Episode 10	2
Olivia Wardell	18	1.84 m (6 ft 1/2 in)	Romsey, England	Episode 10	1

=== Judges ===
- Abbey Clancy (host)
- Hilary Alexander
- Nicky Johnston
- Paul Sculfor

== Episodes ==
No. overall	No. in season	Title	Original release date
119	1	"Episode 1"	16 March 2017
The judges reviewed the audition tapes from their list of semi-finalists, and made their selection for the final 12. The finalists arrived in London and met the editor-in-chief of Cosmopolitan, Fattah Storr, who explained that they would be walking in a show for Cosmopolitan FashFest later that night. The day after the show the models had their promotional photos taken by judge and photographer Nicky Johnston, and later moved into the model apartment, where Talulah-Eve came out as transgender. At panel, Abbey Clancy revealed that no one would be eliminated that week.: Special guests: Fattah Storr, Emma Willis, Anita Kaushik; Featured photographer: Nicky Johnston
120	2	"Episode 2"	23 March 2017
The contestants began their week with a pastel photo shoot at Brigit's Bakery in London for Patisserie de Bain body products, where they each had to embody one of the brand's seven scents. They later had a vlogging challenge in which they had to advertise an assortment of random products. Eleanor was chosen as the challenge winner, and won immunity for the upcoming elimination. She was also allowed to take Abby and Chloe with her for a girls' night out. At judging, Tallulah received best photo. Anastasia, Talulah-Eve and Victoria landed in the bottom three, and Anastasia was eliminated from the competition.: Special guests: Stephanie Bergin, Sarah Ashcraft, Ferne McCann
121	3	"Episode 3"	30 March 2017
The remaining contestants received makeovers at the Paul Edmonds salon, and had a go-see challenge with designers Phillip Armstrong and Tony Burke the following day. Olivia was chosen as the best performer, winning immunity for the upcoming elimination and a dress from the designers. She was also allowed to take Jennifer and Tallulah with her on a luxury cruise in River Thames. For the photo shoot the models were driven to an old estate in the countryside, and had to pose in groups to create cinemagraphs embodying different products of the Garnier Ultimate Blends range. At elimination, Bianca received picture of the week. Abby, Chloe, and Tallulah landed in the bottom three, and Abby was eliminated from the competition.: Special guests: Paul Edmonds, Phillip Armstrong, Tony Burke, Estee Lalonde.; Featured photographer: Adrian Weinbrecht
122	4	"Episode 4"	6 April 2017
The contestants met brand representatives from Colgate, and had a screen test challenge for Colgate Max White in which their line cues were abruptly cut off in the middle of their take in order to test their concentration and ability to memorize lines. Tallulah was chosen as the challenge winner, and won immunity for the upcoming elimination. She also got to shoot a photo campaign for the brand that same afternoon. The following day the models were taken to the DSTRKT night club, and had self-directed photo shoot in pairs where they had to select their own hair, makeup, and styling. At elimination, Simone received photo of the week. Chloe, Talulah-Eve, and Victoria landed in the bottom three, and Victoria was eliminated from the competition.: Special guests: Ana Sanchez, Alex Radcliffe; Featured photographer: Nicky Johnston
123	5	"Episode 5"	13 April 2017
Eleanor began to experience blurred vision at the start of the episode. The contestants were driven to the Brentwood Centre in Essex, and had a photo shoot for SmoothSkin hair removal where they had to jump from a trampoline. While the models had their photos taken, Eleanor was driven to the clinic. Upon arriving back at the house she revealed to the girls that she had been diagnosed with a corneal ulcer in her right eye, and would have to drop out of the competition in order to focus on her treatment. The remaining eight contestants shot an e-commerce campaign for designer Millie Mackintosh for their next challenge. Alannah was chosen as the best performer, winning immunity for the upcoming elimination along with an outfit of her choice. At judging, Olivia received picture of the week. Jennifer, Tallulah, and Talulah-Eve landed in the bottom three, and Talulah-Eve was eliminated from the competition.: Special guests: Davy Thomas, Millie Mackintosh; Featured photographer: Glen Burrows
124	6	"Episode 6"	20 April 2017
The contestants had a styling challenge at the Dorothy Perkins store in the Bluewater shopping centre where they had to pose as window mannequins. Jennifer was chosen as the best performer, winning immunity for the upcoming elimination along with a shopping spree at Dorothy Perkins. The models later had a nightlife photo shoot for Daisy Dixon watches with male models, where Alannah was chosen as the best performer. Both she and Jennifer were chosen to walk in a show for In The Style with contestants from cycle 10, and were allowed to bring Simone and Olivia to walk with them. At elimination, Chloe received picture of the week. Bianca, Olivia, and Tallulah landed in the bottom three, and Bianca was eliminated from the competition.: Special guests: Chloe Keenan, Alex Maw, Suzi Dewsbury, Kieran Owens, Sean Clancy, Kate Gregory, Charlotte Crosby, Bethan Sowerby, Georgia Butler, Jenna McMahon, Lexi Kelly; Featured photographer: Joseph Sinclair
125	7	"Episode 7"	27 April 2017
The remaining six contestants had a very early start to their week when they were driven to Gods Own Junkyard in Walthamstow to be photographed in a photo shoot for Sleek Makeup's Distorted Dreams collection. They later had a second photo shoot for Fiji Water, featuring the pink hibiscus flower as part of the company's label redesign. The models found out that no one would be granted immunity at elimination from that point forward, and also learned that the remaining five contestants at the end of the episode would be travelling abroad to an unknown location. At elimination, Chloe and Simone landed in the bottom two, and Chloe was eliminated from the competition. After her elimination Abbey revealed that the remainder of the competition would be taking place in Cape Verde.: Special guests: Kat Comer, Toby Huntington-Whiteley; Featured photographer: Fern Berresford, Candice Farmer
126	8	"Episode 8"	4 May 2017
The contestants were flown to Santa Maria, where they settled into their new home at the Melia Llana Beach Resort. After a day of relaxation the models had a poolside catwalk challenge for Analita's Boutique which incorporated elements Kizomba, a musical genre originating in Angola. Alannah was chosen as the best performer, winning a shopping spree at the bespoke boutique. The contestants later had a natural beauty photo shoot for Simple Skincare at the Viveiro Botanical Garden. At elimination, Jennifer won picture of the week. Simone and Tallulah landed in the bottom two, and Simone was eliminated from the competition.: Special guests: Jose Luis Cuevas, Tony Pirata, Edoardo Briola, Sabine Noeldeke; Featured photographer: Nicky Johnston
127	9	"Episode 9"	11 May 2017
The remaining four models set sail on a luxury catamaran in a photo shoot for Debenhams, featuring items from Matthew Williamson's Butterfly swimwear range. They were later booked to shoot a national advertisement for Boohoo's S/S 17 festival campaign which was filmed in the streets of the city, before switching locations to the Pedra Lume Salt Crater. At elimination, Olivia received picture of the week and Jennifer won the challenge for the commercial, while Alannah and Tallulah landed in the bottom two. Tallulah was eliminated from the competition, leaving Alannah, Jennifer, and Olivia as the three remaining finalists.: Special guests: Matthew Williamson (in a video message), Hayley Betts, Janey Roberts; Featured photographer: Nicky Johnston
128	10	"Episode 10"	18 May 2017
The final three met with the judges to reflect on their time in the competition, and took part in a black and white nude photo shoot on the beach for which Alannah was later eliminated. The remaining two contestants, Jennifer and Olivia, faced off in a final runway show at the Bikini Beach Club wearing designs by Savannah Miller. At the end of the night the judges deliberated over each finalist's work and progress throughout the competition where they were torn by Jennifer's commercial appeal as well as her consistency throughout the challenges and Olivia's high fashion potential as well as her dynamic portfolio, and Olivia was crowned as the winner.: Special guests: Savannah Miller; Featured photographer: Nicky Johnston

== Results ==
Order	Episode									
Order	2	3	4	5	6	7	8	9	10	
1	Tallulah	Bianca	Simone	Olivia	Chloe	Olivia	Jennifer	Olivia	Olivia	Olivia
2	Eleanor	Olivia	Tallulah	Alannah	Jennifer	Alannah	Alannah	Jennifer	Jennifer	Jennifer
3	Olivia	Alannah	Olivia	Bianca	Simone	Jennifer	Olivia	Alannah	Alannah	
4	Jennifer	Simone	Alannah	Simone	Alannah	Tallulah	Tallulah	Tallulah		
5	Simone	Talulah-Eve	Jennifer	Chloe	Olivia; Tallulah	Simone	Simone			
6	Chloe	Eleanor	Eleanor	Jennifer; Tallulah	Olivia; Tallulah	Chloe				
7	Alannah	Victoria	Bianca	Jennifer; Tallulah	Bianca					
8	Abby	Jennifer	Chloe; Talulah-Eve	Talulah-Eve						
9	Bianca	Chloe; Tallulah	Chloe; Talulah-Eve	Eleanor						
10	Talulah-Eve; Victoria	Chloe; Tallulah	Victoria							
11	Talulah-Eve; Victoria	Abby								
12	Anastasia									

The contestant was immune from elimination
The contestant was eliminated
The contestant withdrew from the competition
The contestant won the competition

=== Bottom two/three ===
Episode	Contestants	Eliminated
2	Anastasia, Talulah-Eve & Victoria	Anastasia
3	Abby, Chloe & Tallulah	Abby
4	Chloe, Talulah-Eve & Victoria	Victoria
5	Jennifer, Tallulah & Talulah-Eve	Talulah-Eve
6	Bianca, Olivia & Tallulah	Bianca
7	Chloe & Simone	Chloe
8	Simone & Tallulah	Simone
9	Alannah & Talullah	Tallulah
10	Alannah, Jennifer & Olivia	Alannah
10	Jennifer & Olivia	Jennifer

The contestant was eliminated after her first time in the bottom two/three
The contestant was eliminated after her second time in the bottom two/three
The contestant was eliminated after her third time in the bottom two/three
The contestant was eliminated after her fifth time in the bottom two/three
The contestant was eliminated in the final judging and placed third
The contestant was eliminated in the final judging and placed as the runner-up

=== Average call-out order ===
Final two is not included.

Rank by average	Place	Model	Call-out total	Number of call-outs	Call-out average
1	1	Olivia	19	9	2.11
2	3	Alannah	30	9	3.33
3	2	Jennifer	33	9	3.67
4	5	Simone	29	7	4.14
5	4	Tallulah	35	8	4.38
6	9	Eleanor	14	3	4.67
7	7	Bianca	27	5	5.40
8	6	Chloe	35	6	5.83
9	8	Talulah-Eve	31	4	7.75
10	10	Victoria	27	3	9.00
11	11	Abby	19	2	10.50
12	12	Anastasia	12	1	12.00
