= Alannah Beirne =

Irish fashion model and reality TV personality

- Born: 6 November 1993 (age 31)
- Occupation: Model
- Relatives: Tadhg Beirne (brother)

Alannah Beirne (born 6 November 1993) is an Irish fashion model and reality TV personality.

== Career ==
In 2017, Beirne competed in cycle 11 of Britain's Next Top Model hosted by Abbey Clancy. She reached the final and was last eliminated behind runner-up Jennifer Malengele and winner Olivia Wardell.

=== Dancing with the Stars ===
In December 2017, was announced as contestant on the second series of the Irish version Dancing with the Stars. She was a last minute replacement for model and former Miss Ireland Aoife Walsh when Walsh sustained an injury forcing her to leave the competition before it started. She was paired with dancer Vitali Kozmin. Beirne and Kozmin became the sixth couple to be eliminated on 4 March 2018.

Dancing with the Stars performances

Week #	Dance/Song	Judges scores			Total	Result
Week #	Dance/Song	Redmond	Barry	Benson	Total	Result
1	No dance performed	-	-	-	-	No elimination
2	Waltz/"Moon River"	6	7	7	20	No elimination
3	Charleston/"Emergency"	8	9	9	26	Safe
4	American Smooth/"City of Stars"	8	9	9	26	Safe
5	Cha-cha-cha/"It's Raining Men"	8	7	8	23	Safe
6	Tango/"Green Light"	9	9	9	27	No elimination
7	Rumba/"Havana"	7	7	8	22	Safe
8	Quickstep/"I'll Be There for You"	8	9	9	26	Bottom two
9	Samba/"Lush Life"	8	8	8	24	Eliminated
9	Team Dance: Freestyle/"On the Floor"	10	10	10	30	Eliminated

== Personal life ==
Beirne's mother, Brenda Hyland Beirne, was crowned the 1983 Rose of Tralee.

Beirne is the sister of Munster and Ireland rugby player, Tadhg Beirne.
