= Simone Murphy =

Scottish musician and model (born 1993)

- Born: 29 July 1993 (age 33); Edinburgh, Scotland
- Occupations: Musician and former model
- Years active: 2016–present

Simone Murphy (born 29 July 1993) is a Scottish musician and former model. Born in Edinburgh, she started modelling aged two before setting up several events while at the University of Edinburgh. After being scouted while working at Harvey Nichols in Edinburgh aged 21, she applied for Cycle 11 of Britain's Next Top Model, on which she placed fifth. That year, Murphy was a finalist in a competition to become PETA UK's Hottest Vegan. She later modelled for Karl Lagerfeld and appeared in music videos by The 1975.

Murphy diversified into DJing during the COVID-19 pandemic in the United Kingdom. She released a remix of Lana Del Rey's "Say Yes to Heaven" in 2023 under the name Sim0ne, which she followed with several original compositions and remixes of Janet Jackson's "Empty" and MCR-T and HorsegiirL's "My Barn My Rules". Critics usually categorise her music as house music, techno, and trance music.

== Life and career ==
=== Early life and Britain's Next Top Model ===
Murphy was born 29 July 1993 in Edinburgh, Scotland, and was named after Nina Simone. Her mother was a stylist and owned a dress shop, and her father was a photographer. She attended George Heriot's School and grew up listening to northern soul, Elvis Presley, and Johnny Cash before being introduced to dance music via Cascada tracks she had downloaded from LimeWire. Aged two, she modelled for The Scotsman fashion magazine, before modelling for local clothing brands as a teenager. Murphy studied Humanities and Social Sciences at the University of Edinburgh, during which time she worked as an events manager and ran club nights. She also spent time on the door of Fly Club and helped set up Fly Festival. Her first job in the fashion industry was a job in Hollister Co. aged nineteen, which she quit after three weeks. After graduating in 2014, she worked in the hospitality and events industry, and took a post on the third floor of Harvey Nichols in Edinburgh, at which she was scouted as a model aged 21. Initially signed to an agency in Glasgow, she moved to an agency in Manchester because it was a bigger city with more work available.

In 2016, after another model from Murphy's agency appeared on Britain's Next Top Model and booked many jobs as a result, she applied for the series' eleventh cycle. She got most of the way through filling out the form before deciding she did not want to film a video for the application, only doing so after the producers emailed her a reminder; she filmed her episodes late that year. Murphy's participation was announced in early 2017, at which point she had spent the previous three summers working in Ibiza. The only Scottish contestant in the lineup, Murphy finished in fifth place. She stated in a May 2022 episode of the Navigating the Modelling Industry podcast that she struggled to find work after appearing on the competition until she spent a winter living in Cape Town. She later modelled for Karl Lagerfeld and appeared in music videos by The 1975.

=== Music and presenting ===
Murphy spent the first four months of the COVID-19 pandemic in Bali, having moved there with a boyfriend just before lockdown, and having signed with an agency in Sydney with the intention of travelling. After returning to Scotland, she broke up with her boyfriend via FaceTime. She later moved to London with a friend after struggling in Scotland. After modelling work became harder to find during the pandemic, she taught herself how to make music. She also came out to her followers as bisexual during this time and quit the modelling industry after finding success as a DJ. In a February 2024 interview with Yazzi Gokcemen of Notion, she expressed pride in leaving the industry on her terms, citing the industry's tendency to phase out models.

In 2023, Murphy released "Say Yes to Heaven" on SoundCloud, a glitchy techno remix of the Lana Del Rey track of the same name, and her own track "Star Sign". Around this time, she began a residency at Rinse FM and was selected by SoundCloud for their "First on SoundCloud" program that July. She then performed a set as part of a day rave comprising entirely female and genderqueer DJs, which had been organised by Nia Archives for her single "Bad Gyalz". She then launched the club night Club Zer0. In December 2023, Andrew Ryce of Resident Advisor wrote that her SoundCloud bootleg version of Janet Jackson's "Empty" had converted "a lament for loneliness" into "a sweaty, almost athletic celebration of togetherness". By the end of that year, she had released a remix of MCR-T and HorsegiirL's "My Barn My Rules".

After being named BBC Radio 1's Future Star of 2024 that January, she released "Halo", a collaboration with Remedy Club. She played a warm-up slot for DJ Daddy Trance at The Carpet Shop in Peckham that February; Skiddle's Ben Jolley wrote that she "delivered thumping techno and trance edits of pop hits like Addison Rae and Charli XCX’s '2 Die 4'", and felt that "Say Yes to Heaven" and "Halo" were highlights. For International Women's Day 2024, she and other women and non-binary DJs performed a set at The Thekla in Bristol. Laviea Thomas of Skiddle described her set as a "concoction of mainstream pop hits, OG club classics and a whole lot of spontaneity", and observed that Murphy got straight "into bouncy club music with EDM-inspired drops", in contrast to other DJs who preferred to take ravers "on a journey to [a] climax". The following month, she released "Work It", a combination of techno and trance.

"This set feels like an unabashed celebration of 2000s girlies who love to dance, the images behind the DJ glitching through anime, paparazzi shots of celebrities like Paris Hilton, psychic hotlines and memes. What looks like an AI version of sim0ne herself is also present on the screen, but the real thing is even better, striking the perfect balance between cool, calm and collected behind the decks and constantly dancing along with the crowd. It’s a great showcase of the little nook sim0ne has carved out for herself." [sic]

— Georgia Jackson of The Soundboard Reviews discussing Murphy's 2024 Leeds Festival performance

In June 2024, she released "Number One Lover", a track inspired by 1990s Eurodance, which she produced in response to comments criticising her practice of dancing while DJing. The track was premiered at a pop up nail salon and karaoke session. She then performed at that year's Leeds Festival; Georgia Jackson of The Soundboard Reviews described her set as "a seamless mix of styles, techno and trance beats, Spice Girls and Lana Del Rey remixes and her own glittering Eurodance and hyperpop-inspired material". She then mounted a tour of Asia, during which she performed at Clockenflap in November 2024. She went viral shortly after the performance after alleging that multiple audience members had sexually harassed her during the performance. She stated in a February 2025 interview that she was working on an EP and was interviewed for the March 2025 BBC documentary Nightclubs: Is the Party Over?. In August 2025, she released the single "Space Cadet".

== Personal life and artistry ==
Murphy lived in Camden Town in July 2022 and had moved to East London by April 2024. She spent a period dating people in the modelling industry before signing up for Hinge in 2022 after a long dating pause. In April 2023, Megan Wallace of Planet Woo noted that she had over 120,000 followers in Instagram, with her social media content comprising humorous videos, modelling looks, and advocacy "on the pressing political issues of the day – from the injustices of Conservative party austerity, to the need to advocate for trans rights amid a context of increasingly overt hate and discrimination". She adopted a vegan lifestyle after being horrified by a social media clip, (Note: She stated in July 2017 that she had done so after watching a clip of a chicken hatchery, while in May 2022, she stated that she had done so after watching Cowspiracy.) noting in May 2022 that she had done so "overnight" "six [or] seven years" earlier. In July 2017, she was a finalist in a competition to become PETA UK's Hottest Vegan, a contest won by Mark Goodwin and Casey Rider.

In March 2017, The Scotsman reported that Murphy had described herself as being influenced by the flower power movement. In April 2022, she told Mixmag that many of the DJs she looked up to were in both the music and fashion worlds, with Peggy Gou starting off in fashion and Virgil Abloh and Dimitri from Paris starting off by mixing for Chanel shows. In July 2022, she told Gay Times that she was inspired to become a DJ by Peggy Gou and that she took inspiration from the fashion choices of Alexa Chung and from the way Jameela Jamil "uses her platform and her voice to speak up for what she believes is right". In January 2024, Tmrw wrote that she was inspired by Gou and Nina Kraviz.

Writing in April 2022, Becky Buckle of Mixmag wrote that a normal day for Murphy involved "playing mixes of camp icons such as Kylie, Lady Gaga and Charli XCX while dressed head-to-toe in Fiorucci". Yazzi Gokcemen used a February 2024 Notion interview to note that her sets "sprawl[ed] techno, hard house, trance and other pulse-raising genres", which Murphy explained as being made out of a desire to make ravers move. AGZ of Guettapen wrote in January 2024 that her sets were inspired by hyperpop, hard house, and trance, while Chiara Maculan of Bricks wrote in June 2024 described her productions as "high energy blends of house, techno, trance, and even acid".

== Filmography ==
Year	Title	Role	Notes
2017	Britain's Next Top Model	Contestant	Eleventh cycle, eight episodes

== Discography ==
=== Singles ===
Singles as lead artist
Title	Year	Ref.
"Halo" (Remedy Club x Sim0ne)	2024	
"Work It" (Sim0ne)	2024	
"Number One Lover" (Sim0ne)	2024	
"Space Cadet" (Sim0ne)	2025	

=== Remixes ===
Title	Year	Ref.
"Say Yes to Heaven" (Sim0ne & Melo Nada Remix) (Lana Del Rey)	2023	
"My Barn My Rules" (Sim0ne Remix) (MCR-T & HorsegiirL)	2023	
"Medium Rare" (Sim0ne Remix) (Tohji)	2024	
