= Di Di Hollywood =

2010 drama film

- Theatrical release poster
- Directed by: Bigas Luna
- Written by: Carmen Chaves Gastaldo; Bigas Luna
- Produced by: Bigas Luna; Beatriz Bodegas; Pedro Pastor
- Starring: Elsa Pataky; Peter Coyote; Paul Sculfor
- Cinematography: Albert Pascual
- Edited by: Regino Hernández; Jaume Martí
- Music by: Lluís Lu
- Production companies: El Virgili Films; La Canica Films; Malvarrosa Media
- Distributed by: Warner Bros. Pictures
- Release date: 15 October 2010
- Running time: 96 minutes
- Country: Spain
- Languages: Spanish; English
- Budget: $8,600,000
- Box office: $1,002,398 (Spain)

Di Di Hollywood is a 2010 Spanish drama film written, directed and produced by Bigas Luna. It stars Elsa Pataky, Peter Coyote, and Paul Sculfor. It was released in Spain on 15 October 2010. It was Luna's final film before his death from leukemia in 2013.

== Summary ==
Diana Diaz (Pataky) works at a bar in Madrid; she wants to be famous, and sets off for Miami. When she arrives, she meets Robert (Hacha), and the pair head to Hollywood, willing to do anything to become famous. Once there, she meets agent Michael McLean (Coyote). He changes her name to "Di Di" and gives her false hopes of becoming famous. But she discovers he really just wants to use her as a beard for gay actor Steve Richards (Sculfor).

== Cast ==
- Elsa Pataky as Diana Diaz "Di Di"
- Peter Coyote as Michael Stein
- Paul Sculfor as Steve Richards
- Giovanna Zacaría as Nora
- Luis Hacha as Robert
- Flora Martínez as María
- Jean-Marie Juan as David
- Leonardo García as Aldo
- Ben Temple as Richard Low
- Ana Soriano as Madre de Diana

== Production ==
=== Filming ===
Filming took place in Madrid, Spain; Valencia, Spain; Elche, Spain; Ciudad de la Luz; and the hospital scene was shot in Benidorm, Spain. Filming was shot from October - November 2009.

== Soundtrack ==
1. "Where No Endings End" by Keren Ann (3:37)
2. "Time of Our Lives" by Gram Rabbit (4:06)
3. "Sad Song" by Au Revoir Simone (4:09)
4. "Loba" by Shakira (3:07)
5. "La Vie en rose" by Louis Armstrong (3:26)
6. "In My Book" by Gram Rabbit (3:25)
7. "Heidi's Theme" by Decoder Ring (2:37)
8. "Candy Flip" by Gram Rabbit (4:46)
9. "Azabache" by Lucas Masciano (5:48)
10. "Amor y lujo" by Mónica Naranjo (4:06)
11. "Curtain Up" by John Cacavas
12. "Fiera inquieta" by Nicolas Uribe
13. "If I Were A Boy" by Kym Mazelle (4:09)
14. "One Way or Another" by Blondie (3:31)

== Reviews ==
Variety reviewed is as "the script proves unable to make Di Di’s journey interesting or credible, while the uncharismatic Pataky is unconvincing as star material."

== See also ==
- List of Spanish films of 2010
