= Norah Casey =

Irish businesswoman and broadcaster

- Born: 27 August 1961 (age 65); Dublin, Ireland
- Occupations: Entrepreneur, publisher, broadcaster
- Partner: Richard Hannaford (m. 1996; d. 2011)
- Children: 1

Norah Casey (born 27 August 1961) is an Irish businesswoman, magazine publisher, television personality and broadcaster from Dublin, Ireland.

== Early life ==
Norah Casey grew up in a lodge in the Phoenix Park, her father and grandfather were park rangers.

Growing up, Casey worked for a period of time in the quarantine section of Dublin Zoo helping to raise gorillas. Casey cites this early experience with animals as the foundation for her love of animals. Casey works with a number of animal conservation charities globally and with the ISPCA to encourage people to adopt animals.

At 17, Casey moved from Dublin to Loch Lomand in Scotland to study nursing. At 23, Casey decided she needed a career change and undertook a postgrad in journalism and television production at Harlow College and Ealing College, respectively. Casey went on to work for several well known broadcasters including the BBC, Sky and LBC and publications, including The Irish Post, before moving back to Ireland where she did an MBO (management buy out) in 2004 of a number of companies owned by Smurfit Kappa.

== Business career ==
Casey's business expertise includes acquiring and launching multiple enterprises as well as a wide range of SME investments in Ireland and internationally. She studied strategic management for a number of years at Ashridge Management College. Casey began her publishing career at the age of 26, after five years as a registered general nurse and a professional officer for the Royal College of Nursing in London. She is the founder of the award-winning company, Harmonia. An Irish publishing house behind such titles including, FOOD&WINE Magazine, Irish Tatler, Tatler Man, Woman's Way, Ireland of the Welcomes and U Magazine.

In November 2017, it was announced that Casey had closed a deal with US-based publishing company Irish Studio (also an investor in Irish Central) to sell six of Harmonia's titles to the company. Norah would remain on the board of each of the titles in an executive role.

Casey still publishes Ireland's best selling women's magazine, 'Woman's Way,' along with several other contracted magazine publications.

== Media career ==
=== Dragon's Den ===
Casey joined the panel of Dragons' Den (Irish TV series) in 2011 for two series.

=== Today ===
Casey became the Friday host, alongside Bláthnaid Ní Chofaigh, of Today with Maura and Daithi. She left the show after one series.

=== The Takeover ===
Casey participated in The Takeover by RTÉ.

=== Norah's Traveller Academy ===
Norah’s Traveller Academy was an RTÉ2 show where Casey advised young ambitious Irish Traveller women who all wanted to go down certain career paths. She helped them on their journey to creating and sustaining jobs in a country where they deal with prejudice on a regular basis.

=== Newstalk ===
In September 2012, Casey began presenting Newstalk's breakfast radio show. She left the station the following Summer to spend more time with her son.

=== Home of the Year ===
In 2016, Casey took part in a Celebrity special of RTÉ's Home of the Year. Her home was voted the winner of the episode. She was awarded a €5,000 prize for a charity of her choice.

=== Dancing with the Stars ===
On 8 December 2017, in an appearance on The Late Late Show, Casey announced she was joining the cast of the second series of Dancing with the Stars (Irish series 2). She was partnered with professional dancer, Curtis Pritchard. They were the first couple eliminated from the competition.

== Personal life ==
Casey married broadcaster Richard Hannaford on New Year's Eve 1996. They had one child together, a son, Dara, in 1998. After a short battle with cancer, Richard died on 12 October 2011.

Casey was a guest on the Late Late Show on 26 May 2017, during which she discussed the abuse she suffered from her first husband. Since this announcement, Norah has worked closely with domestic violence charities, including Women's Aid, most notably on their campaign #TooIntoYou.
