= Will Storr =

British journalist, writer, and photographer

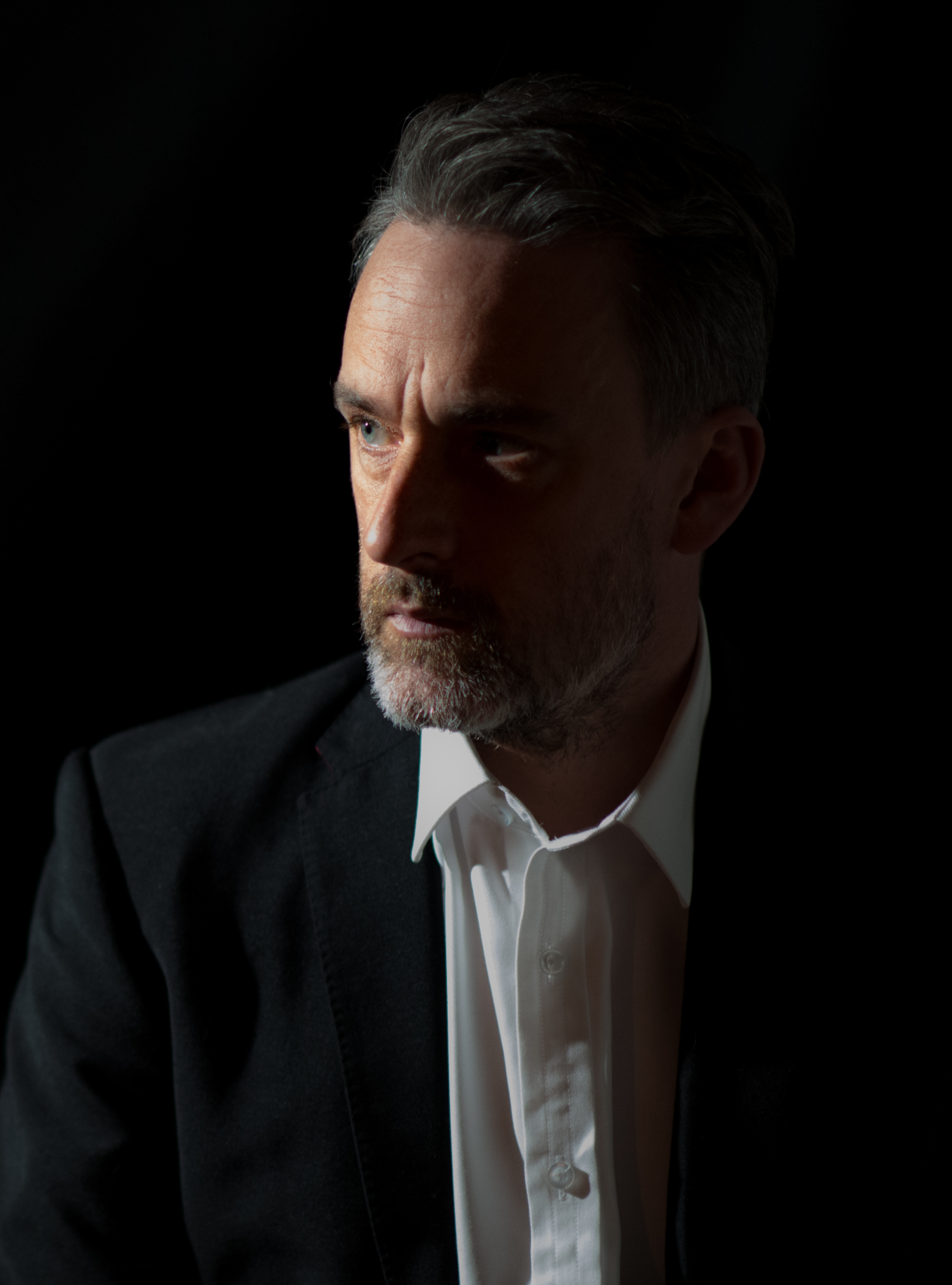
Will Storr

Will Storr is a British author, journalist and former photographer. He has been a contributing editor at Esquire and GQ Australia. He also works as a ghostwriter and public speaker.

== Books ==
Storr has written six books under his own name.

His first book, Will Storr versus The Supernatural, was an investigation into people who believe in ghosts. It included a behind-the-scenes exposé of the British television show Most Haunted and an interview with Gabriele Amorth, the Vatican's chief exorcist. Storr also tracked down Janet Hodgson, who claimed to be the focus of the Enfield Poltergeist haunting in 1977.

The Heretics: Adventures with the Enemies of Science (published in the U.S. and Canada as "The Unpersuadables") was an investigation into irrational belief. Storr met creationists in Australia, the climate change denier Lord Christopher Monckton and went undercover on a trip to former World War II sites with a group of holocaust deniers including David Irving.

Storr's novel The Hunger and the Howling of Killian Lone was a work of horror fiction set in a Michelin-starred kitchen in 1980s London.

Selfie: How We Became So Self-obsessed and What It's Doing to Us was a history of the Western self. In the book, Storr discusses the rise of social media and its effects, attributing many of the more harmful ones to increased pressure on individuals and what he calls "perfectionistic styles of thinking". In 2018 The New Yorker made a short film based on the book.

The Science of Storytelling, was a Sunday Times Bestseller.

The Status Game describes Storr's theory about the hidden structure of social life, focusing on the need for social status and its effects on individual human life and society.

Storr also works as a ghostwriter. He wrote Ant Middleton’s memoir First Man In that was shortlisted in the 2019 British Book Awards.

== Journalism ==
He has covered the South Sudanese Civil War, illegal street racing in the United Kingdom, male suicides, the Lord's Resistance Army in Uganda, the abuse of sugar crop workers in El Salvador, and the race-hate killing of an Aboriginal man in Australia. He has written for media outlets including The Guardian, The Observer, The New York Times, The New Yorker, and The Times.

He received a One World Media award, an Amnesty International award for his work regarding sexual violence against men, and an AIB award for Best Investigative Documentary in 2013 for An Unspeakable Act, a BBC World Service documentary covering human rights abuses in the Democratic Republic of the Congo.

During his reporting in South Sudan Storr was abducted by a militia and narrowly avoided being executed.

He has also been a guest on podcasts including Under The Skin with Russell Brand, The Jordan Harbinger Show, The Ezra Klein Show and The Joe Rogan Experience.

== Photography ==
His portraits of survivors of the Lord's Resistance Army, a heterodox Christian rebel group, have been exhibited at Oxo Tower.

== Personal life ==
He is married to Farrah Storr. His great-great uncle is the journalist, government reformer and author of the book Self-Help, Samuel Smiles.

== Selected bibliography ==
=== Nonfiction ===
- Will Storr vs. The Supernatural: One Man's Search for the Truth About Ghosts (2006) ISBN 0061132195
- The Heretics: Adventures With The Enemies Of Science (2013) ISBN 1447208978 (a.k.a. The Unpersuadables: Adventures with the Enemies of Science [2014] ISBN 1468308181
- Selfie: How We Became So Self-Obsessed and What It's Doing to Us (2017) ISBN 1468315897
- The Science of Storytelling (2019) ISBN 1419743031
- The Status Game: On Social Position and How We Use It (2021) ISBN 0008354634
- A Story is a Deal: How to Use the Science of Storytelling to Lead, Motivate and Persuade (2025) ISBN 0349437238

=== Fiction ===
- The Hunger and the Howling of Killian Lone (2014) ISBN 1476730431
