= Jaded London =

UK fashion brand

Jaded London is streetwear brand based in the United Kingdom. It was founded by siblings Jade and Grant Goulden in 2013.
