= Florentina Agu =

Nigerian fashion designer

Florentina Agu

Florentina Agu is a Nigerian fashion designer. She is the founder and creative director of Hertunba, a womenswear brand launched in 2020 and based in Lagos. In 2024, she won the Veuve Clicquot Bold Future Award.

== Early life and education ==
Part of Agu's life was spent in Benin, where she became familiar with the local cultural norms. Influenced by her upbringing in an Igbo household, her interest in fashion reportedly began at age 13, when she began learning to sew. She mentioned that as a child, she repurposed her parents' old clothes into new garments, watched her grandmother weave, and associated school lessons with the colours of her teachers' outfits as a way to engage academically. She attended the University of Port Harcourt, where she also served as a faculty president. While at the university, she started an event planning business which helped build social connections, fund her education and support her siblings' education.

== Career ==
Prior to entering fashion, Agu held corporate positions in insurance, real estate, and marketing. She learned the basics of operating a fashion business through online videos. She also stated that while working in a corporate setting, she was unable to find clothing that combined a professional appearance with African fabrics and aesthetics, which prompted her to start her own label.

== Hertunba ==
In 2020, during the COVID-19 pandemic, Agu founded the label “Hertunba”. As reported by Essence, she initially produced garments for herself, shared videos of them on social media, and one such video attracted around one million views. The debut collection was shown through an Instagram Live event. The brand name is said to combine the English pronoun "her" with “Otunba”, a title within the Yoruba chieftaincy system. Inspiration for her designs is attributed to akwete, a textile associated with the Igbo people of southeastern Nigeria, and aso oke. Agu has identified sustainability as a core focus of the label, citing the reuse of fabrics. Company information states that remnant materials are converted into home décor or additional garments, that local women receive training as weavers, tailors, and threaders on a per-piece payment basis, and that 10% of net profits support an adult education programme for women with lower incomes.

As of 2025, the label had presented 15 collections including “Catharsis” and “The Women Before Us”, noted as referencing historical figures linked to the Kingdom of Benin including Emotan and Queen Idia. Public figures including Meagan Good, Jackie Aina, Genevieve Nnaji, Tiwa Savage, have all worn the label.

The brand has appeared at Lagos Fashion Week in 2024, 2025 and 2026, and staged a pop-up in London. Agu also held the role of guest editor for Marie Claire Nigeria's first fashion special.

== Awards and recognition ==
- 2024: Winner, Veuve Clicquot Bold Future Award, Nigeria
