= Cricket Fashion =

British luxury fashion retailer

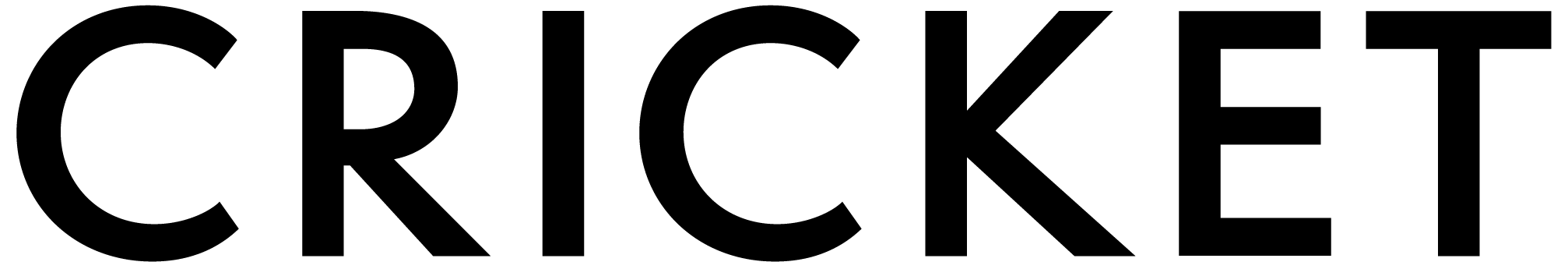
- Cricket Fashion, Liverpool
- Company type: Privately Owned Company
- Industry: Fashion Retail
- Founded: Liverpool in 1991
- Founder: Justine Mills and Gerard Mannix
- Headquarters: Liverpool, United Kingdom
- Number of locations: 1 Metquarter, Liverpool
- Area served: Worldwide
- Products: Men's Fashion; Women's Fashion; Fashion Accessories; Children's Fashion
- Website: http://www.cricket-fashion.com

Cricket Fashion is a luxury fashion retailer for men, women and children based in Liverpool city centre. Specialising in runway designers, the company offers the work of labels including Saint Laurent, Givenchy, Céline, Stella McCartney and Christian Louboutin. Cricket is revered as one of Vogue's best independent stores outside of London.

On Tuesday 17 September 2019, Cricket moved location into Liverpool’s Metquarter.

== History ==
Originally starting in 1991 as a menswear boutique in Cavern Walks on Liverpool’s famous Mathew Street by Gerard Mannix and Justine Mills, Cricket moved into exclusive high-end ladies fashion in 1999.

Cricket was one of the first and very few independent retailers to stock Christian Louboutin shoes and accessories and was chosen alongside Harrods and Harvey Nichols to celebrate Louboutin’s 20th anniversary limited edition collection in 2012.

Co-founder and buyer, Justine Mills, is considered a respected fashion industry expert and businesswoman, recognised by the British Fashion Council as one of their representatives and part of their selection committee.

British designer, Matthew Williamson, hosted Cricket's Celebration Of Style event across Liverpool city centre in November 2014 in association with Matalan.

Cricket was named as one of The 50 Best Boutiques in Britain by The Daily Telegraph in 2019, published by Sunday supplement, Stella Magazine.

== New Store ==
Cricket confirmed speculation that they were moving location in December 2018 with the unveiling of huge hoardings across the front of Liverpool city centre’s celebrated shopping centre, the Metquarter.

== WAGs ==
In 2005, The Guardian dubbed Cricket Fashion "an unofficial footballers' wives' headquarters" with paparazzi regularly camping outside the shop in a bid to see which WAGs of footballers from Liverpool, Everton and Manchester United were shopping there. Regulars include Coleen Rooney, Alex Curran (wife of Steven Gerrard), ex-Emmerdale actress Sheree Murphy and Abbey Clancy (wife of Peter Crouch).

Famously, Coleen Rooney was first photographed by the press in 2003, as the then girlfriend of Wayne Rooney; she was 16 years old and in her school uniform carrying a Cricket Fashion carrier bag.
