= Savannah Miller =

British-American fashion designer (born 1978)

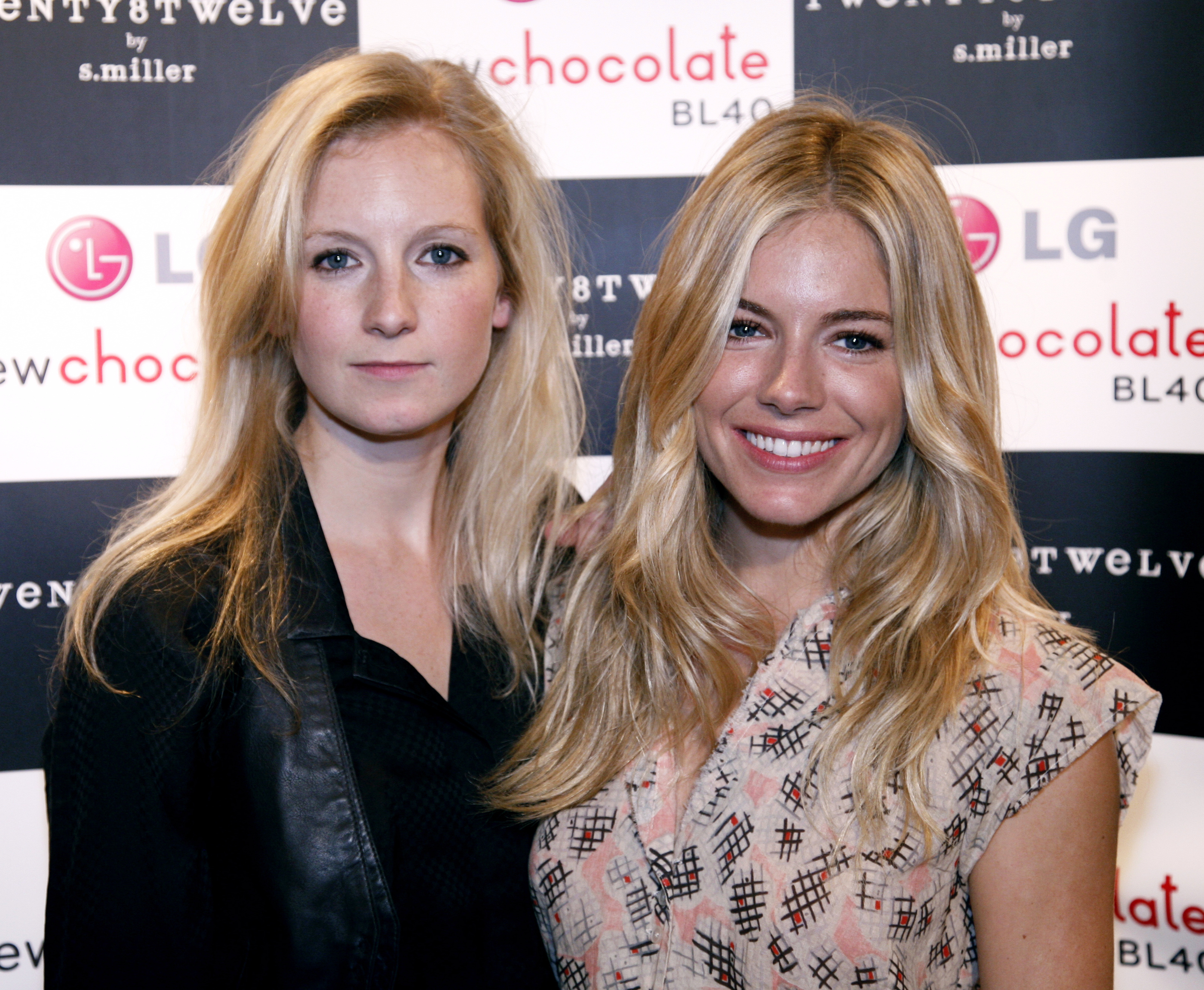
- Miller (left) with her sister, Sienna in September 2009
- Born: Savannah Elizabeth Louise Miller; 30 December 1978 (age 47); British Hong Kong
- Citizenship: United Kingdom; United States
- Occupation: Fashion designer
- Years active: 2004–present
- Spouses: Nick Skinner (m. 2005; div. 2018) James Whewell (m. 2022)
- Children: 4
- Relatives: Sienna Miller (sister); Becki Newton (first cousin once removed); Matt Newton (first cousin once removed)

Savannah Elizabeth Louise Miller (born 30 December 1978) is a British and American fashion designer. After working with Alexander McQueen and Matthew Williamson, she created the label "Twenty8Twelve" with her sister, Sienna Miller. In October 2012 she launched her own collection, "Savannah".

== Early life ==
Miller was born in Hong Kong. Her father, Edwin Miller, is an American dealer in Chinese art, previously a banker, while her mother, Josephine Miller, is a retired British model who was born in South Africa to British parents. She has a sister, Sienna, who is an actress, and two half-brothers, Charles and Stephen. Miller moved to London with her family in the 1980s. On leaving school she went to the Central Saint Martins College of Arts and Design, graduating in 2004 with a first-class honours BA degree in Fashion and Knitwear.

== Career ==
Miller's first jobs were with Alexander McQueen and Matthew Williamson. In 2006 it was announced that Miller's sister Sienna was to design a "fashion capsule" for Pepe Jeans; this project developed into a fashion label called Twenty8Twelve, still backed by Pepe Jeans, and its first collection, designed by the two sisters, was shown in September 2007. They worked together as joint creative directors until 2012. In October of that year Miller left Twenty8Twelve and launched her own collection, "Savannah". The first Savannah line focused on "luxurious basics" and was marketed by Nelly.com. This led on to a Spring 2013 collection, reported as "heavily influenced by the 1970s". The logo of the "Savannah" line is a swallow.

Sometimes associated with the term "boho-chic", in 2006 Miller described a "real bohemian" as "someone who has the ability to appreciate beauty on a deep level, is a profound romantic, doesn't know any limits, whose world is their own creation, rather than living in a box". However, she dislikes the word "bohemian", and the Sunday Times used the term "rural chic" for a collection she designed and modelled for the Hong Kong label Shanghai Tang.

Also an occasional model, Miller has appeared on the cover of Nylon magazine and Sunday Times Style.

In 2023, she made a comeback in ready-to-wear with the launch of the womenswear brand Vivere, tagged as 'new smart'.

== Personal life ==
In 2005, Miller married Nick Skinner, a teacher of Bushcraft from Devon. In 2013, after her fashion business collapsed, the couple sold their house in Gloucestershire and moved to Panama, a negative experience that made them move back to Europe two years later. They then bought another house in the Cotswolds. They separated in 2018.

In December 2022, Miller married James Whewell, heir to the Wyresdale Park estate.
