= Aoife Walsh =

Irish model

- Born: 2 August 1989 (age 37); Clonmel, County Tipperary, Ireland
- Occupations: Model, Miss Ireland

Aoife Walsh (born 2 August 1989) is an Irish fashion model and beauty pageant titleholder who was crowned Miss Ireland 2013 and represented her country at Miss World 2013.

== Career ==
Walsh has a Bachelor of Arts in economics and geography, a master's degree in business management and a master's degree in education.

In 2013, Walsh was crowned Miss Ireland. She went on to represent Ireland at the Miss World competition, where she placed in the top ten in the talent category.

Since winning Miss Ireland, Walsh has carved out a successful modeling career, walking at New York fashion week in 2017. In addition, she started her own blog entitled 'That Ginger Chick', which focuses on fashion, travel, beauty, and lifestyle.

== Personal life ==
Walsh has spoken out about being bullied for her red hair. Is Also distantly related to Jack Issac McMicheal.
