= Farrah Storr =

British journalist

Farrah Storr MBE
- Born: 8 November 1978 (age 47); Manchester, England
- Education: King's College London
- Occupation: Journalist
- Years active: 2001–present
- Title: Editor of Elle (UK)

Farrah Storr MBE (born 8 November 1978) is a British journalist, and the former editor-in-chief of the UK edition of Elle. She previously worked on several UK magazines, winning a PPA Award and a BSME Award in 2018 as editor-in-chief of Cosmopolitan. Storr wrote The Discomfort Zone in 2018. She is currently head of Substack in the UK and Europe.

== Career ==
Storr's first job was working on Women and Home, at age 23. She moved onto Good Housekeeping, then Eve and then Glamour. Storr has been features editor of Marie Claire and deputy editor of Top Santé. Storr launched the UK edition of Women's Health.

A 2017 report by The Guardian and Operation Black Vote listed Storr as one of the 1000 most powerful people in the United Kingdom, making her one of seven BAME (black, Asian and minority ethnic) women to be included on the list.

Storr became editor of the UK edition of Cosmopolitan in July 2015. Storr chose plus-size model Tess Holliday for the front cover of the magazine, with some people viewing the move as glorifying obesity, and Piers Morgan calling it "dangerous and misguided". Storr appeared on Good Morning Britain, which Morgan co-hosts, and argued that Holliday was chosen to "explain that there is a different way to look" in "a culture which venerates being thin". For her work in editing Cosmopolitan, Storr won 2018 Editor of the Year categories in the Professional Publishers Association (PPA) Awards and the British Society of Magazine Editors (BSME) Awards. She was also nominated for the Editors' Editor of the Year Award in the 2018 BSME Awards.

In 2018, Storr wrote The Discomfort Zone: How To Get What You Want by Living Fearlessly. The book includes personal memoirs, interviews and scientific content, linked by the theme of achieving personal growth by spending time in the "discomfort zone". It was published by Piatkus.

In April 2019, it was announced that Storr would be moving from Cosmpolitan to its sister magazine Elle, where she held the same role of editor-in-chief. In 2024 Storr was awarded an MBE for services to media and diversity. She was also a board member of both The Social Mobility Commission, and until 2025, The National Theatre. In 2023 Storr was also made a fellow of Kings College University.

== Personal life ==
Storr's father Javed Iqbal Butt was Pakistani, and was born in Amritsar, India. Storr grew up in Manchester, and has three siblings. Storr was educated at Bury Grammar School (Girls) and graduated with a BA in English and French Literature from King's College London. She is married to author Will Storr.
