= Paul Sculfor =

British male model (born 1971)

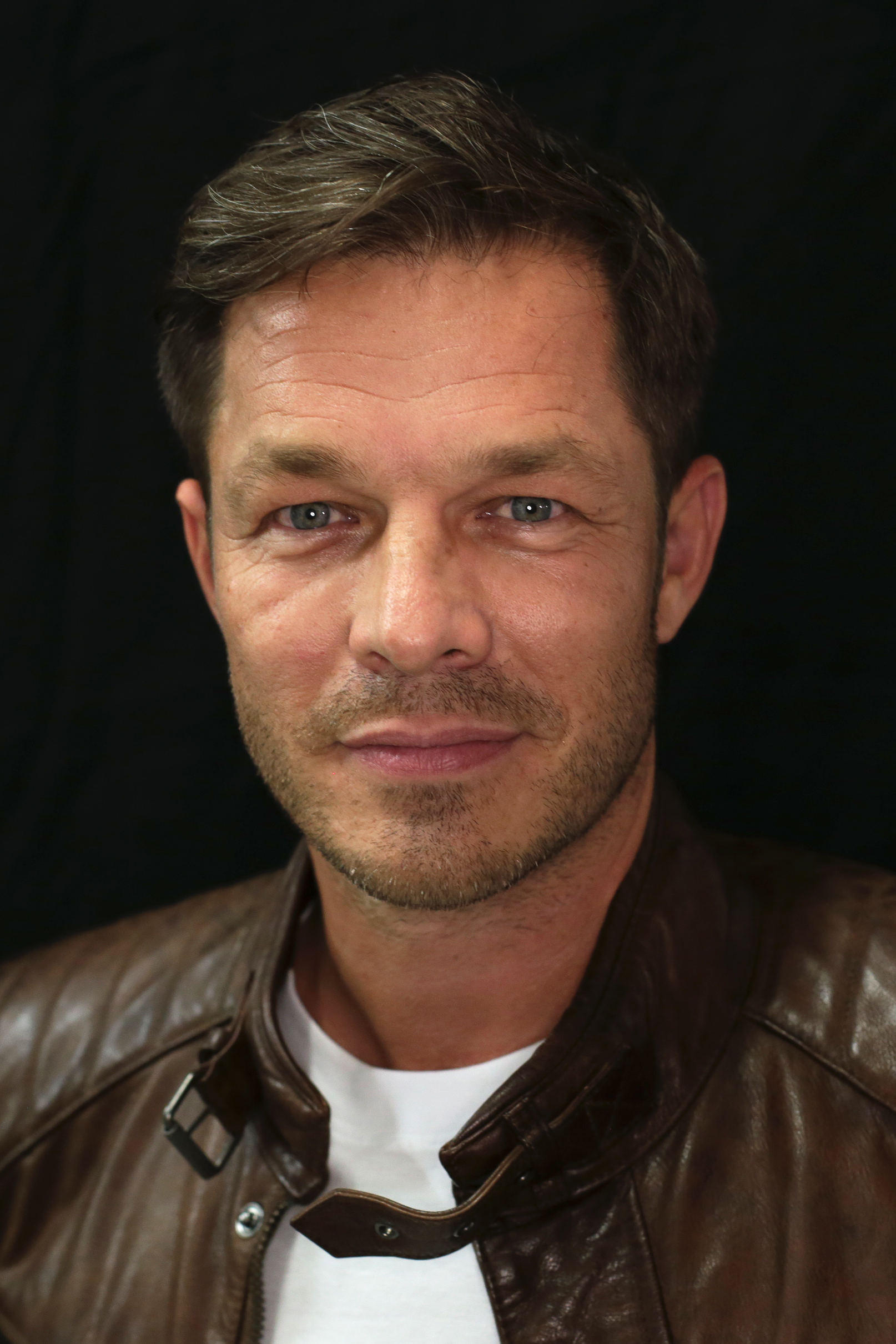
- Paul Sculfor in 2016
- Born: 1 February 1971 (age 55); Upminster, England, United Kingdom
- Spouse: Federica Amati (m. 2016)
- Modeling information
- Height: 6 ft 0 in (1.83 m)
- Hair color: Light brown
- Eye color: Blue
- Agency: Select Model Management; Ford Models; New Madison; View Management; Fashion Model Management; LA Models

Paul Sculfor (born 1 February 1971) is a British male model as well as a TV and film actor.

== Background ==
Between the ages of eight and ten, Sculfor studied gymnastics, and when he was 10, he joined the Dagenham Boxing Club. He had one competitive fight for them, at 15, which was a late start in the boxing world. He then joined the Alma Boxing Club and competed with them for the next three years. As a schoolboy, Sculfor boxed at the British Championships and reached the semi-final. In his teenage boxing career, he won the Northeast London title and the South East England title. Between the ages of 12 and 14, he also competed as a schoolboy in the trampoline event and finished in the top three for three years in a row.

Sculfor's grandfather was John Hawkridge, a decorated British sergeant in the Second World War, who owned a number of market stalls in the famous East End's Roman Road and Rathbone Street markets. As a kid, Sculfor spent nearly all his weekends there.

== Modelling career ==
At the age of 21, Sculfor won the modelling competition 'The Face of 92' in association with Select Model Management and the Daily Mirror. Sculfor was unaware his mother had entered him in the competition; he was in the hospital having had his appendix removed when he received the letter saying he was in the finals of the competition, alongside Rod Stewart's wife Penny Lancaster. The judges included Tandy, the owner of Select Model Management and Gary Stretch.

Sculfor's first modelling job was for The Face magazine and in the autumn of 1993, Sculfor worked alongside Bridget Hall on the winter/fall 1993 campaign for Banana Republic, shot by prolific photographer Bruce Weber. The campaign featured on billboards all over New York's Times Square.

Sculfor soon moved to Europe, where he was working out of Milan and Paris with the likes of Giorgio Armani, Versace, and Jean Paul Gaultier, Paul Smith and Valentino.

In 1994 Sculfor and Laurence Vanhaeverbeke modelled for the Christian Dior fragrance Tendre Poison, which was photographed by Tyen, and the campaign ran for three years.

Due to his success as a male model, he has frequently been referred to as 'the original supermodel'. One article commented on 'the face that's worth a million dollars'.

=== Selected campaigns ===
- Patrick Cox, 1993
- Versace with Gisele Bundchen, 2009
- Louis Vuitton, 2011
- Aramis, 2012
- ''Esquire, 2012
- Other – for a full list of campaigns visit Models.com

=== Selected covers ===
- Attitude Magazine, 1997.
- Out Magazine, 2009.
- Fantastic Man, July 2005.

=== Selected TV campaigns ===
- Levi's Campaign, 1997. Directed by Michel Gondry.
- Lynx (deodorant) Campaign, 2001 with Lisa Snowdon.
- Land Rover, 2006. Freelander campaign shot in Thailand.
- Next Campaign, 2007 with Alessandra Ambrosio.
- Next Campaign, 2008.
- Aramis Campaign, 2011.
- Louis Vuitton Campaign, 2011.

== Film and television ==
=== Selected filmography ===
- Di Di Hollywood (2010) … Steve Richards
- Psychosis (2010) … David
- Baseline (2010) … Mark

=== Television appearances ===
- Britain's Next Top Model (2012, 2016) … Himself/Judge
- Cinema 3 (2010) … Himself
- Light Lunch (1997) … Himself
- "Five A Side" (2014) … Lee Kennedy
- Death in Paradise (2015) … Nicky Dexter – Episode 4.2

== Selected presenter work ==
- San Remo Festival, 2009. In 2009, Sculfor was the co-host for the San Remo Festival alongside Paolo Bonolis, the first time a male had presented alongside Mr. Bonolis as it was usually a female presenter.

== Awards ==
- Most Stylish Man Award as part of the GQ and Ermenegildo Zegna Elegant Men of The Year' awards in 2010.

== Personal life ==
Prior to getting married, Sculfor had a series of high-profile girlfriends, including Lisa Snowdon, Jennifer Aniston and Cameron Diaz. In 2016, Sculfor married socialite Federica Amati. They have two daughters.

== See also ==
- List of people on the cover of Attitude magazine
