= Robert Rowiński =

Polish dancer, choreographer and model (born 1984)

- Born: 19 May 1984 (age 42); Koszalin, Poland
- Education: Collegium Civitas
- Occupations: Dancer; Choreographer Model
- Known for: Dancing with the Stars (Irish series); Taniec z gwiazdami

Robert Rowiński (born 19 May 1984) is a Polish dancer, choreographer and model. Rowiński is a professional dancer on the Polish and Irish versions of Dancing with the Stars.

== Early life ==
Rowiński is the son of Bożena and Bogdan Rowiński. He has an older sister, Wioleta.

Rowiński completed postgraduate masters studies at the Faculty of Journalism at the University of Warsaw and undertook doctoral sociological studies at Collegium Civitas. He wrote his doctoral thesis on the psychology of emotions in dance.

== Dancing with the Stars ==
=== Poland (Taniec z gwiazdami) ===
In Spring 2006, Rowiński made his Taniec z gwiazdami debut dancing with former Miss World, Aneta Kręglicka in the third series of the show. They finished in 7th place.

In Autumn 2006, Rowiński took part in the fourth series of the show. He was paired with actress, Magdalena Wójcik. They finished in 8th place.

In Autumn 2007, Rowiński competed in the sixth series dancing with singer, Halina Mlynkova. Due to an injury sustained in rehearsals, Mlynkova was forced to leave the competition meaning the couple finished in 11th place.

In Spring 2010, Rowiński rejoined the show after three years away pursuing other projects. He was paired with actress and TV presenter, Aleksandra Szwed in the eleventh series. They were eliminated in 9th place.

In Autumn 2010, Rowiński took part in what would be his final season of Taniec z gwiazdami. He was partnered with Olympic pole-vaulter, Monika Pyrek. On 28 November 2010, Pyrek and Rowiński were voted the winners of the twelfth series.

In July 2022, it was announced that Rowiński would return as a professional dance for the twenty-sixth season after a twelve year absence. He will partner, influencer and Farma co-host, Ilona Krawczyńska.

Series	Partner	Place
3	Aneta Kręglicka	7th
4	Magdalena Wójcik	8th
6	Halina Mlynkova	11th
11	Aleksandra Szwed	9th
12	Monika Pyrek	1st
26	Ilona Krawczyńska	1st

==== Series 3 ====
Celebrity partner
Aneta Kręglicka; Average: 29.0; Place: 7th

Week No.	Dance/Song	Judges' score				Total	Result
Week No.	Dance/Song	Pavlović	Wodecki	Tyszkiewicz	Galiński	Total	Result
1	Cha-cha-cha / "I Got Rhythm"	5	7	8	5	25	No elimination
2	Quickstep / "Can't Get You Out of My Head"	6	8	9	7	30	Safe
3	Jive / "You Never Can Tell"	6	8	9	7	30	Safe
4	Foxtrot / "Everybody Loves Somebody"	6	8	9	8	31	Safe
5	Samba / "Baila, Baila Conmigo"	6	8	8	7	29	Eliminated

==== Series 4 ====
Celebrity partner
Magdalena Wójcik; Average: 30.5; Place: 8th

Week No.	Dance/Song	Judges' score				Total	Result
Week No.	Dance/Song	Pavlović	Wodecki	Tyszkiewicz	Galiński	Total	Result
1	Cha-cha-cha / "When You're Gone"	6	8	8	7	29	No elimination
2	Quickstep / "No Me Voy Sin Bailar"	5	9	9	8	31	Bottom two
3	Samba / "Tic, Tic Tac"	6	8	9	6	29	Bottom two
4	Foxtrot / "Smells Like Teen Spirit"	7	9	9	8	33	Eliminated

==== Series 6 ====
Celebrity partner
Halina Mlynkova; Average: 35.5; Place: 11th

Week No.	Dance/Song	Judges' score				Total	Result
Week No.	Dance/Song	Pavlović	Wodecki	Tyszkiewicz	Galiński	Total	Result
1	Group Mambo / "Ran Kan Kan"	-	-	-	-	-	No elimination
2	Quickstep / "Oh Marie"	7	10	10	8	35	Safe
3	Jive / "Maria"	8	10	10	8	36	Safe
4	-	-	-	-	-	-	Withdrew

==== Series 11 ====
Celebrity partner
Aleksandra Szwed; Average: 35.4; Place: 9th

Week No.	Dance/Song	Judges' score				Total	Result
Week No.	Dance/Song	Pavlović	Wodecki	Tyszkiewicz	Galiński	Total	Result
1	Waltz / "It Is You (I Have Loved)"	6	8	9	7	30	No elimination
2	Rumba / "Careless Whisper"	7	9	10	9	35	Safe
3	Tango / "Sombras"	8	10	10	10	38	Safe
4	Paso Doble / "Another Brick in the Wall"	10	10	10	10	40	Safe
5	Viennese Waltz / "You'll Never Walk Alone"	8	9	9	8	34	Eliminated

==== Series 12 ====
Celebrity partner
Monika Pyrek; Average: 37.2; Place: 1st

Week No.	Dance/Song	Judges' score				Total	Result
Week No.	Dance/Song	Pavlović	Wodecki	Tyszkiewicz	Galiński	Total	Result
2	Quickstep / "Lemon Tree"	8	8	10	9	35	Safe
3	Jive / "Maneater"	8	9	10	9	36	Safe
4	Foxtrot / "Blue Velvet"	8	9	9	9	35	Safe
5	Samba / "Bailamos"	8	9	10	9	36	Safe
6	Waltz in American Smooth / "Just the Way You Are"	7	9	9	7	32	Safe
7	Cha-cha-cha / "Baw mnie"	10	10	10	10	40	Safe
8	Rumba / "(Where Do I Begin?) Love Story"	7	10	10	10	37	Safe
9	Tango / "Nie wierz mi, nie ufaj mi"	10	10	10	10	40	Safe
10	Salsa / "Demasiado Corazon"; Quickstep / "We No Speak Americano"	9; 8	9; 10	10; 10	9; 8	37; 36	Safe
11	Jive / "Hey Boy (Get Your Ass Up)"; Viennese Waltz / "Where the Wild Roses Grow"	6; 10	9; 10	10; 10	7; 10	32; 40	Safe
12	Paso Doble / "Bad Romance"; Argentine Tango / "Sensuel"	8; 10	9; 10	10; 10	9; 10	36; 40	Bottom two
13	Cha-cha-cha / "Baw mnie" Tango / "Nie wierz mi, nie ufaj mi" Freestyle / "Nothing Compares 2 U"	10; 10; 10	10; 10; 10	10; 10; 10	10; 10; 10	40; 40; 40	Winners

==== Series 26 ====
Celebrity partner
Ilona Krawczyńska; Average: 36,5; Place; 1st

Week No.	Dance/Song	Judges' score				Total	Result
Week No.	Dance/Song	Piaseczny	Pavlović	Malitowski	Grabowski	Total	Result
1	Samba / "Cotton Eye Joe"	9	8	8	8	33	Safe
2	Quickstep / "Crazy in Love"	9	9	8	9	35	Safe
3	Rumba / "Trudno tak"	9	7	7	9	32	Safe
4	Foxtrot / "Save Your Tears"; Team Dance / "Alternatywy 4"	9; 8	9; 8	8; 6	8; 7	34; 29	Safe
5	Waltz / "My Heart Will Go On"	9	9	8	9	35	Safe
6	Swing / "Be My Baby"	9	8	8	9	34	Safe
7	Cha-cha-cha (with Milena Krawczyńska) / "Let's Get Loud"; Quickstep / "Walking On Sunshine"	10; 10	9; 10	10; 10	10; 10	39; 40	Safe
8	Foxtrot / "Girls Like You"; Paso Doble / "Les Toreadors"	10; 10	10; 10	9; 10	10; 10	39; 40	Safe
9	Tango (with Łukasz Jurkowski) / "Beggin'"; Rumba / "Hello"	10; 10	10; 10	9; 10	10; 10	39; 40	Safe
10	Jive / "Day-O"; Swing / "Be My Baby"; Freestyle / "To tylko tango", "Krakowski spleen"	10; 10; 10	10; 8; 10	9; 8; 10	10; 10; 10	39; 36; 40	Winners

=== Ireland ===
In November 2017, it was announced that Rowiński would be taking part in the 2018 Irish version of Dancing with the Stars. He was partnered with journalist and broadcaster, Maïa Dunphy. They reached the fifth week of the competition, ultimately finishing in 9th place.

In 2019, Rowiński returned for his second series. He was partnered with country music singer, Cliona Hagan. In the seventh week of the competition, the couple became the first pair to receive a perfect score of 30. On 24 March 2019, Rowiński and Hagan reached the final of the competition. They finished as joint runners-up with Johnny Ward and Emily Barker when Mairéad Ronan and John Nolan were named as the winners.

In 2020, Rowiński returned for his third series. He was partnered with Virgin Media One presenter, Glenda Gilson. They were the second couple to be eliminated from the competition.

In 2023, Rowiński returned to the show after a three-year absence when Maurizio Benenato left the series in the third week due to unforeseen circumstances. He was partnered with Eurovision singer, Brooke Scullion. They reached the final, finishing as joint runners-up to Carl Mullan & Emily Barker.

In 2024, Rowiński returned for his fifth series. He was partnered with former RTÉ News presenter, Eileen Dunne. They were the fourth couple to be eliminated from the competition after losing the dance-off to Rosanna Davison & Stephen Vincent.

In 2025, Rowiński returned for his sixth series. He was partnered with former Miss Universe Ireland, Aishah Akorede. They reached the semi-finals and were the seventh couple to be eliminated from the show, losing their dance-off to Jack Woolley & Alex Vladimirov.

In 2026, Rowiński returned for his seventh series. He partnered with Nationwide presenter, Anne Cassin.

In October 2026, Rowinski announced that he had parted ways with the Irish version of the show.

Series	Partner	Place
2	Maïa Dunphy	9th
3	Cliona Hagan	2nd
4	Glenda Gilson	10th
6	Brooke Scullion	2nd
7	Eileen Dunne	8th
8	Aishah Akorede	5th
9	Anne Cassin	9th

Highest and Lowest Scoring Per Dance

Dance	Partner	Highest	Partner	Lowest
American Smooth	Aishah Akorede	27	Eileen Dunne	14
Cha-cha-cha	Brooke Scullion	30	Maïa Dunphy; Eileen Dunne	13
Charleston	Cliona Hagan	25	Demi Isaac Oviawe^{1}	13
Contemporary Ballroom	Brooke Scullion	30	Glenda Gilson	18
Foxtrot	Aishah Akorede	26	Eileen Dunne	17
Jive	Brooke Scullion	27	Eileen Dunne	17
Paso Doble	Brooke Scullion	30	Eileen Dunne	19
Quickstep	Cliona Hagan	30	Aishah Akorede	22
Rumba	Cliona Hagan	27	Maïa Dunphy	19
Salsa	Cliona Hagan; Brooke Scullion	25	Aishah Akorede	20
Samba	Brooke Scullion	26	Aishah Akorede	24
Showdance	Cliona Hagan	30	Brooke Scullion	29
Tango	Brooke Scullion	28	Eileen Dunne	17
Viennese Waltz	Brooke Scullion	25	Cliona Hagan	22
Waltz	Cliona Hagan	30	Glenda Gilson	15

^{1} This score was awarded during Switch-Up Week.

==== Series 2 (2018) ====
Celebrity partner
Maïa Dunphy; Average: 16.8; Place: 9th

Week No.	Dance/Song	Judges' score			Total	Result
Week No.	Dance/Song	Redmond	Barry	Benson	Total	Result
1	No dance performed	-	-	-	-	No elimination
2	Cha-cha-cha / Don't Be So Hard on Yourself"	4	4	5	13	No elimination
3	Waltz / "See the Day"	5	5	6	16	Safe
4	Rumba / "Up Where We Belong"	6	6	7	19	Safe
5	Tango / "Hernando's Hideaway"	6	6	7	19	Eliminated

==== Series 3 (2019) ====
Celebrity partner
Cliona Hagan; Average: 25.5; Place: 2nd

Week No.	Dance/Song	Judges' score			Total	Result
Week No.	Dance/Song	Redmond	Barry	Benson	Total	Result
1	No dance performed	-	-	-	-	No elimination
2	Quickstep / "Country Girl (Shake It for Me)"	7	7	7	21	No elimination
3	Rumba / "Let You Love Me"	7	6	7	20	Safe
4	Jive / "Perfect Day"	6	7	8	21	Safe
5	American Smooth / "Man! I Feel Like a Woman!"	7	7	8	22	Safe
6	Charleston / "Wings"	4	4	5	13	No elimination Switch-Up Week with Demi Isaac Oviawe
7	Tango / "Sweet but Psycho"	8	8	9	25	Safe
8	Waltz / "A Time for Us"	10	10	10	30	Safe
9	Salsa / "Mujer Latina"; Team Past / "All That Jazz (Castro Remix)"	8; 9	8; 10	9; 10	25; 29	Safe
10	Charleston / "Puppet on a String"; Euro-thon / "Making Your Mind Up"	8 Extra	8; 4	9 Points	25; 29	Safe
11	Viennese Waltz / "Runaway"; Cha-cha-cha / "Respect"	7; 9	7; 9	8; 10	22; 28	Safe
12	Quickstep / "Country Girl (Shake It for Me)"; Rumba / "Let You Love Me"; Showdance / "The Champion"	10; 9; 10	10; 9; 10	10; 9; 10	30; 27; 30	Runners-up

==== Series 4 (2020) ====
Celebrity partner
Glenda Gilson; Average: 16.7; Place: 10th

Week No.	Dance/Song	Judges' score			Total	Result
Week No.	Dance/Song	Redmond	Barry	Benson	Total	Result
1	No dance performed	-	-	-	-	No elimination
2	Cha-cha-cha / Don't Start Now"	5	6	6	17	No elimination
3	Waltz / "I Never Loved a Man (The Way I Love You)"	5	5	5	15	Safe
4	Contemporary Ballroom / "My Heart Will Go On"	6	6	6	18	Eliminated

==== Series 6 (2023) ====
Celebrity partner
Brooke Scullion; Average: 26.9; Place: 2nd

Week No.	Dance/Song	Judges' score			Total	Result
Week No.	Dance/Song	Redmond	Barry	Gourounlian	Total	Result
1^{1}	Salsa / "Let Them Know"	8	8	9	25	No elimination
2^{1}	Quickstep / "Love Machine"	7	8	8	23	No elimination
3	Rumba / "2002"	8	9	9	26	Safe
4	Paso Doble / "The Greatest Show"	8	8	8	24	Safe
5	Samba / "SloMo"	8	9	9	26	Safe
6	Viennese Waltz / "Breakaway"	8	8	9	25	No elimination
7	Jive / "2 Be Loved (Am I Ready)"	9	9	9	27	Safe
8	Contemporary Ballroom / "Running Up That Hill (A Deal With God)"	10	10	10	30	Safe
9	Tango / "Libertango"; Team Freestyle / "HandClap"	9; 9	9; 9	10; 9	28; 27	Bottom two
10	Cha-cha-cha / "A Second to Midnight"; Marathon / "I Want Candy"	10; Awarded	10; 5	10; Points	30; 35	Safe
11	Paso Doble / "The Greatest Show"; Showdance / "Hallucinate"	10; 10	10; 9	10; 10	30; 29	Runners-up

^{1}For weeks 1 & 2, Scullion performed her dances with her original partner, Maurizio Benenato.

==== Series 7 (2024) ====
Celebrity partner
Eileen Dunne; Average: 16.3; Place: 8th

Week No.	Dance/Song	Judges' score			Total	Result
Week No.	Dance/Song	Redmond	Barry	Gourounlian	Total	Result
1	American Smooth / "I'm a Woman"	4	5	5	14	No elimination
2	Cha-cha-cha / "Let's Get Loud"	5	4	4	13	No elimination
3	Waltz / "Try to Remember"	5	6	6	17	Safe
4	Tango / "Super Trouper"	5	6	6	17	Safe
5	Jive / "Let's Twist Again"	5	6	6	17	Safe
6	Foxtrot / "Proud Mary"	5	6	6	17	No elimination
7	Paso Doble / "Viva Torero"	6	6	7	19	Eliminated

==== Series 8 (2025) ====
Celebrity partner
Aishah Akorede; Average: 31.5; Place: 5th

Week No.	Dance/Song	Judges' score				Total	Result
Week No.	Dance/Song	Redmond	Byrne	Barry	Gourounlian	Total	Result
1	Quickstep / "Stargazing"	7	7	7	8	29	No elimination
2	Salsa / "Deep Down"	6	7	7	7	27	No elimination
3	Tango / "I Like the Way You Kiss Me"	7	8	7	8	30	Safe
4	Cha-cha-cha / "Rescue Me"	8	8	-	8	24	Safe
5	Samba / "Kese (Dance)"	8	7	8	8	31	Safe
6	Charleston / "Ooh Aah... Just a Little Bit"	7	8	8	7	30	Bottom two
7	Paso Doble / "We Found Love"	8	8	8	9	33	Bottom two
8	American Smooth / "A Thousand Miles"	8	9	9	10	36	Safe
9	Jive / "Hang Tight Honey"; Team Dance / "Timber"	8; 9	8; 10	8; 10	8; 10	32; 39	Bottom two
10	Foxtrot / "Black Magic"; Scare-a-thon / "Time Warp"	8 Couple	9 awarded	9; 1	9 point	35; 36	Eliminated

==== Series 9 (2026) ====
Celebrity partner
Anne Cassin; Average: TBA; Place: TBA
