= Cliona Hagan =

Irish country music singer

- Born: 27 February 1989 (age 36); Ballinderry, County Tyrone, Northern Ireland
- Genres: Country
- Occupation: Singer
- Labels: Sharpe Music · Rosette Records
- Spouse: Simon Sheerin (m. 2022)
- Website: https://clionahagan.com

Cliona Hagan (born 27 February 1989) is an Irish country music singer from Ballinderry, County Tyrone, in Ireland.

== Career ==
=== The All Ireland Talent Show ===
Hagan appeared as a contestant on the 2009 first series of the RTÉ reality talent competition, The All Ireland Talent Show. Mentored by Eurovision winner Dana, Hagan made it the final of the competition, ultimately losing out to The Mulkerrins.

=== 2010–2015 ===
Following her appearance on The All Ireland Talent Show, Hagan began studying in Queen's University Belfast where she earned a degree in music. She went on to study at the University of Edinburgh, where she became qualified in secondary school music teaching.

Between 2013 and 2015, Hagan worked as a schoolteacher. In 2016, she decided to give it up to pursue a career in singing.

=== 2015–present ===
On 28 October 2016, Hagan's debut album Straight To You was released.

In a country music special edition of the long-running Irish chat show, The Late Late Late Show, well-known Irish country singer Philomena Begley named Hagan as "one to watch" for the future of Irish country music.

Hagan has supported acts such as Nathan Carter, Derek Ryan and Mike Denver on tour across Ireland and Europe.

In March 2018, while Ireland was suffering the effects of Storm Emma, Hagan performed two songs on The Late Late Late Show. One month later, Hagan returned to the show for their annual country music special performing a duet of 'Hurts So Good' alongside Nathan Carter.

On 22 June 2018, the album Secret Love was released.

In September 2018, Hagan was named Best Irish Country Female Artist at the Irish Post Country Music Awards.

In 2019, Hagan was announced as one of the celebrities taking part in the third series of Dancing with the Stars. Hagan was partnered with professional dancer Robert Rowiński on the show. On 22 March 2019, they reached the final of the competition, finishing as joint runners-up with Johnny Ward and Emily Barker, with Mairéad Ronan and John Nolan becoming the eventual winners.

On 29 November 2019, the album Little Darlin' was released. A DVD named Travelling Shoes, which was a video collection of Hagan's music videos and live performances, was also released on the same day.

On 21 October 2021, Hagan released a new album; The Dolly Songbook. The album was a tribute to Dolly Parton, in which Hagan recorded twelve of her songs.

== Personal life ==
Hagan was born in Ballinderry, County Tyrone. On 25 May 2022, she married musician Simon Sheerin in County Westmeath. The wedding was later featured on an episode of the documentary From This Moment On, which premiered on BBC One Northern Ireland on 2 November.
