= John Nolan (dancer) =

Irish dancer and choreographer (born 1990)

- Born: 20 July 1990 (age 35); Kilkenny, Ireland
- Occupations: Dancer; Choreographer
- Known for: Dancing with the Stars (Irish series)
- Height: 1.80 m (5 ft 11 in)

John Nolan (born 20 July 1990) is an Irish dancer and choreographer. He is an Irish national ballroom and showdance champion. Nolan is known for being a dancer on the Irish version of Dancing with the Stars.

== Career ==
Nolan has been dancing since the age of three. In his career he has an earned the title of Irish national ballroom and showdance champion. He also runs Xquisite Dance Group who competed in Ireland's Got Talent. They received Denise Van Outen's Golden Buzzer at their audition and eventually finished as runners-up in the grand final.

== Dancing with the Stars ==
In 2017, Nolan was announced as one of the professional dancers for the first series of Dancing with the Stars. He was partnered with RTÉ News reporter, Teresa Mannion. They were eliminated in week eight of the competition, finishing in seventh place.

In 2018, Nolan was partnered with actress and comedian, Deirdre O'Kane. On 25 March 2018, O'Kane and Nolan reached the final of the show finishing as joint-runners up alongside, Anna Geary and Kai Widdrington.

In 2019, Nolan was partnered with television and radio presenter, Mairéad Ronan. In the final on 24 March 2019, receiving more votes than both finalists Johnny Ward & Emily Barker and Cliona Hagan & Robert Rowiński, Ronan and Nolan were named as champions. Nolan became the first professional dancer to make two consecutive finals in a row.

In 2020, Nolan was partnered with RTÉ broadcaster, Mary Kennedy. Nolan and Kennedy reached the ninth week of the competition, they were eliminated in a dance-off against eventual finalists Grainne Gallanagh and Kai Widdrington.

In 2022, Nolan partnered television presenter, Gráinne Seoige. Seoige and Nolan reached the eighth week of the competition, they were eliminated in a dance-off against Jordan Conroy and Salome Chachua.

In 2023, Nolan was partnered with Derry Girls actress, Leah O'Rourke. They were the first couple eliminated from the competition.

Series	Partner	Place
1	Teresa Mannion	7th
2	Deirdre O'Kane	2nd
3	Mairéad Ronan	1st
4	Mary Kennedy	6th
5	Gráinne Seoige	8th
6	Leah O’Rourke	11th

Highest and Lowest Scoring Per Dance

Dance	Partner	Highest	Partner	Lowest
American Smooth	Mairéad Ronan	22	Leah O’Rourke	10
Cha-cha-cha	Deirdre O'Kane	22	Leah O'Rourke	11
Charleston	Deirdre O'Kane; Mairéad Ronan	29		
Contemporary Ballroom	Mairéad Ronan	30	Deirdre O'Kane	27
Foxtrot	Deirdre O'Kane	22	Mary Kennedy	13
Jive	Mairéad Ronan	24	Deirdre O'Kane	18
Paso Doble	Mairéad Ronan	27	Leah O'Rourke	14
Quickstep	Deirdre O'Kane	29	Teresa Mannion	12
Rumba	Gráinne Seoige	13		
Salsa	Deirdre O'Kane	19	Teresa Mannion; Mary Kennedy	16
Samba	Mairéad Ronan	21	Gráinne Seoige	17
Showdance	Mairéad Ronan	30	Deirdre O'Kane	27
Tango	Mairéad Ronan	24	Teresa Mannion	16
Viennese Waltz	Mairéad Ronan	30	Mary Kennedy	16
Waltz	Deirdre O'Kane	20	Gráinne Seoige	14

=== Series 1 ===
Celebrity partner
Teresa Mannion; Average: 15.4; Place: 7th

Week No.	Dance/Song	Judges' score			Total	Result
Week No.	Dance/Song	Redmond	Barry	Benson	Total	Result
1	No dance performed	-	-	-	-	No elimination
2	Tango / "Here Comes the Rain Again"	5	5	6	16	No elimination
3	Cha-cha-cha / "What Doesn't Kill You"	5	5	5	15	Safe
4	Quickstep / "9 to 5"	3	4	5	12	Safe
5	Salsa / "Boogie Wonderland"	5	6	5	16	Safe
6	Foxtrot / "Somethin' Stupid"	5	5	5	15	Safe
7	Viennese Waltz / "Powerful"	8	9	9	26	No elimination Switch-Up Week with Denise McCormack
8	Paso Doble / "Habanera"	5	5	6	16	Eliminated

=== Series 2 ===
Celebrity partner
Deirdre O'Kane; Average: 24.2; Place: 2nd

Week No.	Dance/Song	Judges' score			Total	Result
Week No.	Dance/Song	Redmond	Barry	Benson	Total	Result
1	No dance performed	-	-	-	-	No elimination
2	Jive / "Mayhem"	6	6	6	18	No elimination
3	Tango / "I Drove All Night"	6	6	7	19	Safe
4	Quickstep / "Peppy and George"	8	8	9	25	Safe
5	Salsa / "La Vida Es Un Carnaval"	6	6	7	19	Safe
6	Quickstep / "Life's About to Get Good"	6	6	7	19	No elimination Switch-Up Week with Erin McGregor
7	Waltz / "The Rainbow Connection"	7	6	7	20	Safe
8	Paso Doble / "Tragedy"	7	8	9	24	Safe
9	Charleston / "Sparkling Diamonds"; Team Dance / "On the Floor"	8; 10	9; 10	9; 10	26; 30	Safe
10	Foxtrot / "One"; Swing-a-thon / "You Can't Stop the Beat"	7 Extra	7; 1	8 Point	22; 23	Safe
11	Contemporary Ballroom / "Zombie"; Cha-cha-cha / "Can You Feel It"	9; 7	9; 7	9; 8	27; 22	Safe
12	Charleston / "Sparkling Diamonds"; Quickstep / "Peppy and George"; Showdance / "Let Me Entertain You"	9; 10; 9	10; 9; 9	10; 10; 9	29; 29; 27	Runners-up

=== Series 3 ===
Celebrity partner
Mairéad Ronan; Average: 25.3; Place: 1st

Week No.	Dance/Song	Judges' score			Total	Result
Week No.	Dance/Song	Redmond	Barry	Benson	Total	Result
1	No dance performed	-	-	-	-	No elimination
2	Waltz / "You Light Up My Life"	6	6	6	18	No elimination
3	Charleston / "Bom Bom"	8	8	8	24	Safe
4	Tango / "Pretty Woman"	8	8	8	24	Safe
5	Contemporary Ballroom / "Rule the World"	8	8	9	25	Safe
6	Quickstep / "Stop Me from Falling"	8	8	8	24	No elimination Switch-Up Week with Clelia Murphy
7	Quickstep / "Nothing Breaks Like a Heart"	8	8	8	24	Safe
8	Samba / "Copacabana"	7	7	7	21	Safe
9	American Smooth / "Beyond the Sea"; Team Dance / "Born This Way"	7; 8	7; 9	8; 9	22; 26	Safe
10	Paso Doble / "Euphoria"; Eurothon / "Making Your Mind Up"	9 Extra	9; 3	9 Points	27; 30	Safe
11	Jive / "Perfect on Paper"; Viennese Waltz / "You Are the Reason"	8; 10	8; 10	8; 10	24; 30	Safe
12	Charleston / "Bom Bom"; Contemporary Ballroom / "Rule the World"; Showdance / "Don't Rain on My Parade"	9; 10; 10	10; 10; 10	10; 10; 10	29; 30; 30	Winners

=== Series 4 ===
Celebrity partner
Mary Kennedy; Average: 17.2; Place: 6th

Week No.	Dance/Song	Judges' score			Total	Result
Week No.	Dance/Song	Redmond	Barry	Benson	Total	Result
1	No dance performed	-	-	-	-	No elimination
2	Foxtrot / "No Frontiers"	3	5	5	13	No elimination
3	Salsa / "Ran Kan Kan"	5	5	6	16	Safe
4	American Smooth / "He's a Tramp"	5	7	7	19	Safe
5	Waltz / "Nocturne"	5	5	6	16	Safe
6	Viennese Waltz / "Guilty"	9	9	9	27	No elimination Switch-Up Week with Sinéad O'Carroll
7	Viennese Waltz / "What Have I Done"	5	5	6	16	Safe
8	Tango / "Por una Cabeza"	6	7	6	19	Safe
9	Cha-cha-cha / "Young Hearts Run Free"; Team Dance / "Physical"	6; 8	6; 8	6; 8	18; 24	Eliminated

=== Series 5 ===
Celebrity partner
Gráinne Seoige; Average: 17.3; Place: 8th

Week No.	Dance/Song	Judges' score			Total	Result
Week No.	Dance/Song	Redmond	Barry	Gourounlian	Total	Result
1	Waltz / "With You I'm Born Again"	4	5	5	14	No elimination
2	No dance performed	-	-	-	-	No elimination
3	Paso Doble / "Devil Woman"	5	6	6	17	Safe
4	Rumba / "Diamonds Are Forever"	4	4	5	13	Safe
5	American Smooth / "Cheek to Cheek"	6	6	7	19	Safe
6	Samba / "Africa"	5	6	6	17	No elimination
7	Tango / "Santa Maria"	7	7	8	22	Safe
8	Cha-cha-cha / "Dancing in the Street"	6	7	7	19	Eliminated

=== Series 6 ===
Celebrity partner
Leah O’Rourke; Average: 11.7; Place: 11th

Week No.	Dance/Song	Judges' score			Total	Result
Week No.	Dance/Song	Redmond	Barry	Gourounlian	Total	Result
1	Paso Doble / "School's Out"	4	4	6	14	No elimination
2	American Smooth / "This Will Be (An Everlasting Love)"	3	3	4	10	No elimination
3	Cha-cha-cha / "Bongo Cha Cha Cha"	3	4	4	11	Eliminated
