= Oviawe =

Oviawe is a Nigerian surname. Notable people with the surname include:

- Demi Isaac Oviawe (born 2000), Nigerian-born Irish actress
- Joan Osa Oviawe, Nigerian educationalist
