= Dancing with the Stars (Irish TV series) series 3 =

Dancing with the Stars
- Series 3
- Presented by: Jennifer Zamparelli; Nicky Byrne
- Judges: Julian Benson; Loraine Barry; Brian Redmond; Darren Bennett (guest)
- Celebrity winner: Mairéad Ronan
- Professional winner: John Nolan
- No. of episodes: 12

Release
- Original network: RTÉ One
- Original release: 6 January – 24 March 2019

Series chronology
- ← Previous; Series 2 Next → Series 4

Dancing with the Stars returned for a third series on 6 January 2019 on RTÉ One for a twelve-week run.

Nicky Byrne returned as host for a third year, joined by Jennifer Zamparelli who replaces Amanda Byram as co-host.

Brian Redmond, Loraine Barry and Julian Benson all returned as judges.

== Couples ==
On 2 December 2018, Mairéad Ronan, was officially announced as the first celebrity to be taking part. Celebrity reveals then continued every day until 7 December when the final three contestants were revealed during an appearance on The Late Late Show.

On 26 December 2018, professional dancer Curtis Pritchard was involved in an incident where he and his brother, AJ Pritchard, were attacked in a nightclub by eight people. Curtis sustained injuries to his face, eye and knee. Because of the attack, Curtis was forced to undergo surgery on his knee, he was therefore ruled out of taking part in the series until further notice. It was confirmed he would be replaced by a new professional dancer. On 4 January 2019, Curtis' replacement was confirmed as being former Strictly Come Dancing professional dancer Trent Whiddon. The rest of the pairings were revealed later that day on the pre-show, Can't Stop Dancing.

Celebrity	Known for	Professional	Status
Eilish O'Carroll	Mrs Brown’s Boys actress	Ryan McShane	Eliminated 1st on 20 January 2019
Holly Carpenter	Former Miss Ireland	Trent Whiddon	Eliminated 2nd on 27 January 2019
Darren Kennedy	TV presenter & style entrepreneur	Karen Byrne	Eliminated 3rd on 3 February 2019
Demi Isaac Oviawe	The Young Offenders actress	Kai Widdrington; Robert Rowiński (Week 6)	Eliminated 4th on 17 February 2019
Peter Stringer	Former rugby player	Ksenia Zsikhotska; Valeria Milova (Week 6)	Eliminated 5th on 24 February 2019
Denis Bastick	Former Dublin GAA footballer	Valeria Milova; Giulia Dotta (Week 6)	Eliminated 6th on 3 March 2019
Clelia Murphy	Fair City actress	Vitali Kozmin; John Nolan (Week 6)	Eliminated 7th on 10 March 2019
Fred Cooke	Comedian	Giulia Dotta; Emily Barker (Week 6)	Eliminated 8th on 17 March 2019
Cliona Hagan	Country music singer	Robert Rowiński; Vitali Kozmin (Week 6)	Runners-up on 24 March 2019
Johnny Ward	Actor	Emily Barker; Ksenia Zsikhotska (Week 6)	Runners-up on 24 March 2019
Mairéad Ronan	Television & radio presenter	John Nolan; Kai Widdrington (Week 6)	Winners on 24 March 2019

== Scoring chart ==
Couple	Place	1	2	3	1/2+3	4	5	6	7	6+7	8	9	10	11	12
Mairéad & John	1	—	18	24	42	24	25	26	24	50	21	22+26=48	27+3=30	24+30=54	29+30+30=89
Johnny & Emily	2	22	—	19	41	25	20	19	27	46	29	28+26=54	30+5=35	27+28=55	28+30+30=88
Cliona & Robert	2	—	21	20	41	21	22	28	25	53	30	25+29=54	25+4=29	22+28=50	30+27+30=87
Fred & Giulia	4	12	—	23	35	13	17	14	24	38	24	20+26=46	17+2=19	21+24=45	
Clelia & Vitali	5	—	19	21	40	26	21	24	23	47	25	26+29=55	19+1=20		
Denis & Valeria	6	15	—	17	32	14	23	21	20	41	23	24+29=53			
Peter & Ksenia	7	16	—	14	30	20	19	16	25	41	20				
Demi & Kai	8	—	10	14	24	20	16	13	21	34					
Darren & Karen	9	16	—	14	30	18	18								
Holly & Trent	10	—	16	15	31	16									
Eilish & Ryan	11	—	15	12	27										

Red numbers indicate the couples with the lowest score for each week.
Green numbers indicate the couples with the highest score for each week.
the couple eliminated that week
the returning couple that was called forward and eventually last to be called safe, but was not necessarily in the bottom
the returning couple that finished in the bottom two and competed in the Dance-Off
the winning couple
the runner-up couple

=== Average chart ===
This table only counts for single dances scored on a traditional 30-points scale. It does not include the Team Dance or Marathon scores.

Rank by average	Place	Couple	Total points	Number of dances	Total average
1	2	Johnny & Emily	362	14	25.86
2	1	Mairéad & John	354	14	25.26
2	2	Cliona & Robert	354	14	25.26
4	5	Clelia & Vitali	204	9	22.67
5	6	Denis & Valeria	157	8	19.63
6	4	Fred & Giulia	209	11	19.00
7	7	Peter & Ksenia	130	7	18.57
8	9	Darren & Karen	66	4	16.50
9	10	Holly & Trent	47	3	15.67
9	8	Demi & Kai	94	6	15.67
11	11	Eilish & Ryan	27	2	13.50

== Highest and lowest scoring performances ==
The highest and lowest performances in each dance according to the judges' scale are as follows.

Dance	Celebrity	Highest score	Celebrity	Lowest score
Tango	Johnny Ward	29	Denis Bastick	14
Cha-cha-cha	Cliona Hagan	28	Demi Isaac Oviawe	10
Salsa	Clelia Murphy; Mairéad Ronan	26	Peter Stringer; Holly Carpenter	16
Foxtrot	Johnny Ward	28	Demi Isaac Oviawe	14
Charleston	Mairéad Ronan	29	Demi Isaac Oviawe	13
Waltz	Cliona Hagan	30	Holly Carpenter	15
Quickstep	Cliona Hagan	30	Peter Stringer	14
Jive	Johnny Ward	30	Darren Kennedy	14
Rumba	Johnny Ward; Cliona Hagan	27	Demi Isaac Oviawe	16
Paso doble	Johnny Ward	28	Fred Cooke	14
American Smooth	Johnny Ward	27	Fred Cooke	13
Contemporary Ballroom	Johnny Ward; Mairéad Ronan	30		
Samba	Cliona Hagan; Johnny Ward	28	Eilish O'Carroll	12
Viennese waltz	Mairéad Ronan	30	Peter Stringer	19
Showdance	Mairéad Ronan; Johnny Ward; Cliona Hagan	30		
Team Dance	Clelia Murphy; Cliona Hagan; Denis Bastick	29	Fred Cooke; Johnny Ward; Mairéad Ronan	26
Eurothon	Johnny Ward	5	Clelia Murphy	1

== Couples' highest and lowest scoring dances ==
Couple	Highest scoring dance	Lowest scoring dance
Mairéad & John	Viennese waltz Contemporary Ballroom; Showdance (30)	Waltz (18)
Cliona & Robert	Waltz; Quickstep; Showdance (30)	Rumba (20)
Johnny & Emily	Contemporary Ballroom; Jive; Showdance (30)	Foxtrot; Quickstep (19)
Fred & Giulia	Quickstep; Jive; Salsa (24)	Cha-cha-cha (12)
Clelia & Vitali	Salsa; Charleston (26)	Jive; Waltz (19)
Denis & Valeria	Paso doble (24)	Tango (14)
Peter & Ksenia	Charleston (25)	Quickstep (14)
Demi & Kai	Viennese waltz (21)	Cha-cha-cha (10)
Darren & Karen	Charleston; Salsa (18)	Jive (14)
Holly & Trent	Salsa; Foxtrot (16)	Waltz (15)
Eilish & Ryan	Tango (15)	Samba (12)

== Weekly scores and songs ==
Unless indicated otherwise, individual judges scores in the charts below (given in parentheses) are listed in this order from left to right: Brian Redmond, Loraine Barry, Julian Benson.

=== Week 1 ===
Guest act: Series 2 champions, Jake Carter and Karen Byrne performing a Contemporary Ballroom to 'Sign of the Times'.

Running order (Men)

Couple	Score	Dance	Music
Darren & Karen	16 (5, 5, 6)	Tango	"Sharp Dressed Man" — ZZ Top
Denis & Valeria	15 (4, 5, 6)	American Smooth	"It's a Beautiful Day" — Michael Bublé
Fred & Giulia	12 (3, 4, 5)	Cha-cha-cha	"Sexy and I Know It" — LMFAO
Johnny & Emily	22 (7, 7, 8)	Jive	"Johnny B. Goode" — Leif Garrett
Peter & Ksenia	16 (5, 5, 6)	Salsa	"Come with Me" — Ricky Martin

=== Week 2 ===
Guest act: Ryan Mack performing 'Sofa'.

Running order (Women)

Couple	Score	Dance	Music
Holly & Trent	16 (5, 5, 6)	Salsa	"Neon Lights" — Demi Lovato
Eilish & Ryan	15 (5, 5, 5)	Tango	"I Can't Tell a Waltz from a Tango" — Alma Cogan
Demi & Kai	10 (3, 3, 4)	Cha-cha-cha	"Cut to the Feeling" — Carly Rae Jepsen
Cliona & Robert	21 (7, 7, 7)	Quickstep	"Country Girl (Shake It for Me)" — Luke Bryan
Mairéad & John	18 (6, 6, 6)	Waltz	"You Light Up My Life" — Whitney Houston
Clelia & Vitali	19 (5, 7, 7)	Jive	"Tell Her About It" — Billy Joel

=== Week 3 ===
Running order

Couple	Score	Dance	Music	Result
Mairéad & John	24 (8, 8, 8)	Charleston	"Bom Bom" — Sam and the Womp	Safe
Demi & Kai	14 (4, 5, 5)	Foxtrot	"After All" — The Frank and Walters	Last to be called safe
Eilish & Ryan	12 (3, 4, 5)	Samba	"Eso Beso" — Emma Bunton	Eliminated
Cliona & Robert	20 (7, 6, 7)	Rumba	"Let You Love Me" — Rita Ora	Safe
Peter & Ksenia	14 (5, 4, 5)	Quickstep	"Wake Me Up" — Avicii	Last to be called safe
Denis & Valeria	17 (5, 6, 6)	Cha-cha-cha	"Promises (David Guetta Remix)" — Calvin Harris and Sam Smith	Safe
Clelia & Vitali	21 (7, 7, 7)	Tango	"Verano Porteño"—Astor Piazzolla	Safe
Darren & Karen	14 (4, 5, 5)	Jive	"Fun, Fun, Fun" — The Beach Boys and Royal Philharmonic Orchestra	Safe
Holly & Trent	15 (5, 5, 5)	Waltz	"Lollipops and Roses" — Jack Jones	Safe
Fred & Giulia	23 (7, 8, 8)	Charleston	"Right Said Fred" — Bernard Cribbins	Safe
Johnny & Emily	19 (6, 6, 7)	Foxtrot	"This Town" — Niall Horan	Safe

=== Week 4: Movie Week ===
Running order

Couple	Score	Dance	Music	Movie	Result
Cliona & Robert	21 (6, 7, 8)	Jive	"Perfect Day" — Hoku	Legally Blonde	Last to be called safe
Holly & Trent	16 (5, 5, 6)	Foxtrot	"Beauty and the Beast" — Emma Thompson	Beauty and the Beast	Eliminated
Denis & Valeria	14 (4, 5, 5)	Tango	"Danger Zone" — Kenny Loggins	Top Gun	Safe
Demi & Kai	20 (6, 6, 8)	Salsa	"One Night Only" — Beyoncé, Anika Noni Rose and Sharon Leal	Dreamgirls	Safe
Fred & Giulia	13 (4, 4, 5)	American Smooth	"The Pink Panther Theme" — Henry Mancini	The Pink Panther	Last to be called safe
Johnny & Emily	25 (8, 8, 9)	Viennese waltz	"Kiss from a Rose" — Seal	Batman Forever	Safe
Darren & Karen	18 (6, 6, 6)	Charleston	"I Wanna Be Like You" — The Overtones	The Jungle Book	Safe
Mairéad & John	24 (8, 8, 8)	Tango	"Oh, Pretty Woman" — Roy Orbison and The Royal Philharmonic Orchestra	Pretty Woman	Safe
Peter & Ksenia	20 (6, 7, 7)	Paso doble	"Un Poco Loco" — Anthony Gonzalez and Gael García Bernal	Coco	Safe
Clelia & Vitali	26 (8, 9, 9)	Salsa	"Night Fever" — Bee Gees	Saturday Night Fever	Safe

=== Week 5: Most Memorable Year Week ===
Running order

Couple	Score	Dance	Music	Result
Fred & Giulia	17 (5, 6, 6)	Tango	"Beat It"—Michael Jackson	Safe
Peter & Ksenia	19 (6, 6, 7)	Viennese waltz	"A Thousand Years"—Christina Perri	Safe
Darren & Karen	18 (6, 6, 6)	Salsa	"María" — Ricky Martin	Eliminated
Demi & Kai	16 (5, 5, 6)	Rumba	"Dance with My Father" — Luther Vandross	Safe
Denis & Valeria	23 (7, 8, 8)	Charleston	"The Power" — Snap!	Last to be called safe
Clelia & Vitali	21 (7, 7, 7)	Viennese waltz	"The Fair City Waltz" — Hugh Drumm & Adam Lynch	Last to be called safe
Johnny & Emily	20 (7, 6, 7)	Cha-cha-cha	"Picture of You" — Boyzone	Safe
Cliona & Robert	22 (7, 7, 8)	American Smooth	"Man! I Feel Like a Woman!" — Shania Twain	Safe
Mairéad & John	25 (8, 8, 9)	Contemporary Ballroom	"Rule the World" — Take That	Safe

=== Week 6: Switch-Up Week ===
Guest act: Wild Youth performing 'Making Me Dance'.

Running order

Couple	Score	Dance	Music
Peter & Valeria	16 (5, 5, 6)	Cha-cha-cha	"Body" — Loud Luxury feat. brando
Demi & Robert	13 (4, 4, 5)	Charleston	"Wings" — Little Mix
Fred & Emily	14 (4, 5, 5)	Paso doble	"Y Viva España" — Black Lace
Johnny & Ksenia	19 (6, 6, 7)	Quickstep	"Are You Gonna Be My Girl" — Jet
Denis & Giulia	21 (7, 7, 7)	Jive	"Great Balls of Fire" — Jerry Lee Lewis
Clelia & John	24 (8, 8, 8)	Quickstep	"Stop Me from Falling" — Kylie Minogue
Mairéad & Kai	26 (8, 9, 9)	Salsa	"Dance Again" — Jennifer Lopez feat. Pitbull
Cliona & Vitali	28 (9, 9, 10)	Samba	"Taki Taki" — DJ Snake feat. Selena Gomez, Ozuna & Cardi B

=== Week 7 ===
Individual judges scores in the charts below (given in parentheses) are listed in this order from left to right: Brian Redmond, Loraine Barry, Darren Bennett.

Due to an illness, Darren Bennett filled in for Julian Benson for the night.

Running order

Couple	Score	Dance	Music	Result
Clelia & Vitali	23 (7, 8, 8)	Cha-cha-cha	"She's a Lady" — Tom Jones	Safe
Denis & Valeria	20 (6, 7, 7)	Waltz	"I Wonder Why" — Curtis Stigers	Safe
Cliona & Robert	25 (8, 8, 9)	Tango	"Sweet but Psycho" — Ava Max	Safe
Demi & Kai	21 (7, 7, 7)	Viennese waltz	"Fallin'" — Alicia Keys	Eliminated
Fred & Giulia	24 (8, 8, 8)	Quickstep	"Dancin' Fool" — from Copacabana	Bottom two
Johnny & Emily	27 (9, 9, 9)	Rumba	"Say You Won't Let Go" — James Arthur	Safe
Mairéad & John	24 (8, 8, 8)	Quickstep	"Nothing Breaks Like a Heart" — Mark Ronson feat. Miley Cyrus	Last to be called safe
Peter & Ksenia	25 (8, 9, 8)	Charleston	"Pencil Full of Lead" — Paolo Nutini	Safe

Dance-Off

Judges' votes to save

- Bennett: Fred & Giulia
- Redmond: Fred & Giulia
- Barry: Did not vote, but would have voted to save Fred & Giulia

=== Week 8: Orchestra Night ===
Individual judges scores in the charts below (given in parentheses) are listed in this order from left to right: Brian Redmond, Loraine Barry, Darren Bennett.

Darren Bennett filled in for Julian Benson.

All performances this week are accompanied by the RTÉ Concert Orchestra.

Running order

Couple	Score	Dance	Music	Result
Mairéad & John	21 (7, 7, 7)	Samba	"Copacabana" — Barry Manilow	Safe
Denis & Valeria	23 (7, 8, 8)	Foxtrot	"Someone like You" — Adele	Safe
Clelia & Vitali	25 (8, 8, 9)	Paso doble	"Funiculì, Funiculà" — Luigi Denza & Peppino Turco	Bottom two
Peter & Ksenia	20 (6, 7, 7)	American Smooth	"New York, New York" — Frank Sinatra	Eliminated
Johnny & Emily	29 (9, 10, 10)	Tango	"Viva la Vida" — Coldplay	Safe
Cliona & Robert	30 (10, 10, 10)	Waltz	"A Time for Us" — Henry Mancini	Safe
Fred & Giulia	24 (8, 8, 8)	Jive	"I'm Still Standing" — Elton John	Last to be called safe

Dance-Off

Judges' votes to save

- Bennett: Clelia & Vitali
- Redmond: Clelia & Vitali
- Barry: Did not vote, but would have voted to save Clelia & Vitali

=== Week 9: Team Dance Week ===
Julian Benson returned to the panel following a two-week absence.

After each couple performed their individual dance, all six couples were separated into two teams to perform a team dance to earn a higher individual scores.

Running order

Couple	Score	Dance	Music	Result
Cliona & Robert	25 (8, 8, 9)	Salsa	"Mujer Latina" — Thalía	Safe
Mairéad & John	22 (7, 7, 8)	American Smooth	"Beyond the Sea" — Robbie Williams	Safe
Clelia & Vitali	26 (8, 9, 9)	Charleston	"I Got Rhythm" — The Puppini Sisters	Bottom two
Denis & Valeria	24 (8, 8, 8)	Paso doble	"Carnaval de Paris" — Dario G	Eliminated
Fred & Giulia	20 (6, 7, 7)	Viennese waltz	"With a Little Help from My Friends" — Joe Cocker	Safe
Johnny & Emily	28 (9, 9, 10)	Samba	"Shape of You (Remix)" — Ed Sheeran feat. Zion & Lennox	Safe
Clelia & Vitali; Cliona & Robert; Denis & Valeria	29 (9, 10, 10)	Freestyle ("Team Past")	"All That Jazz (Castro Remix)" — from Chicago	
Fred & Giulia; Johnny & Emily; Mairéad & John	26 (8, 9, 9)	Freestyle ("Team Future")	"Born This Way" — Lady Gaga	

Dance-Off

Judges' votes to save

- Benson: Clelia & Vitali
- Redmond: Denis & Valeria
- Barry: Clelia & Vitali

=== Week 10: Eurovision Week ===
After each couple performed their individual dance, all five couples took to the floor for the "Eurothon" in a bid to increase their scores.

Guest act: Johnny Logan performing "Hold Me Now" and Sarah McTernan performing '22'.

Running order

Couple	Score	Dance	Music	Eurovision	Result
Fred & Giulia	17 (5, 6, 6)	Samba	"We've Got the World" — Mickey Joe Harte	11th place, Ireland - 2003	Bottom two
Johnny & Emily	30 (10, 10, 10)	Contemporary Balroom	"Rise like a Phoenix" — Conchita Wurst	1st place, Austria - 2014	Safe
Cliona & Robert	25 (8, 8, 9)	Charleston	"Puppet on a String" — Sandie Shaw	1st place, United Kingdom - 1967	Safe
Clelia & Vitali	19 (6, 6, 7)	Waltz	"All Kinds of Everything"—Dana	1st place, Ireland - 1970	Eliminated
Mairéad & John	27 (9, 9, 9)	Paso doble	"Euphoria"—Loreen	1st place, Sweden - 2012	Safe
Johnny & Emily; Cliona & Robert; Mairéad & John; Fred & Giulia; Clelia & Vitali	5; 4; 3; 2; 1	Eurothon	"Making Your Mind Up" — Bucks Fizz	1st place, United Kingdom - 1981	

Dance-Off

Judges' votes to save

- Benson: Fred & Giulia
- Redmond: Clelia & Vitali
- Barry: Fred & Giulia

=== Week 11: St. Patrick's Day ===
The couples will perform two dances, the first being a song by an Irish artist to celebrate Saint Patrick's Day.

Guest act: Walking on Cars performing 'Coldest Water'.

Running order

Couple	Score	Dance	Music	Result
Cliona & Robert	22 (7, 7, 8)	Viennese waltz	"Runaway" — The Corrs	Safe
Cliona & Robert	28 (9, 9, 10)	Cha-cha-cha	"Respect" — Aretha Franklin and The Royal Philharmonic Orchestra	Safe
Fred & Giulia	21 (7, 7, 7)	Foxtrot	"Brown Eyed Girl" — Van Morrison	Eliminated
Fred & Giulia	24 (8, 8, 8)	Salsa	"Best Years of Our Lives" — Modern Romance	Eliminated
Mairéad & John	24 (8, 8, 8)	Jive	"Perfect On Paper" — The Blizzards	Safe
Mairéad & John	30 (10, 10, 10)	Viennese waltz	"You Are the Reason" — Calum Scott and Leona Lewis	Safe
Johnny & Emily	27 (9, 9, 9)	American Smooth	"Power Over Me" — Dermot Kennedy	Bottom two
Johnny & Emily	28 (9, 9, 10)	Paso doble	"Kashmir"—Escala	Bottom two

Dance-Off
For the dance-off Johnny & Emily chose to perform their Paso doble, while Fred & Giulia chose their Salsa.

Judges' votes to save

- Benson: Johnny & Emily
- Redmond: Johnny & Emily
- Barry: Did not vote, but would have voted to save Johnny & Emily

=== Week 12: The Final ===
Guest act: Westlife performing 'Hello My Love'.

Running order

Couple	Score	Dance	Music	Result
Mairéad & John	29 (9, 10, 10)	Charleston	"Bom Bom" — Sam and the Womp	Winner
Mairéad & John	30 (10, 10, 10)	Contemporary Ballroom	"Rule the World" — Take That	Winner
Mairéad & John	30 (10, 10, 10)	Showdance	"Don't Rain on My Parade" — Barbra Streisand	Winner
Johnny & Emily	28 (9, 9, 10)	Foxtrot	"This Town" — Niall Horan	Runner-up
Johnny & Emily	30 (10, 10, 10)	Jive	"Johnny B. Goode" — Leif Garrett	Runner-up
Johnny & Emily	30 (10, 10, 10)	Showdance	"Bad Man" — Pitbull feat. Robin Thicke, Joe Perry & Travis Barker	Runner-up
Cliona & Robert	30 (10, 10, 10)	Quickstep	"Country Girl (Shake It for Me)" — Luke Bryan	Runner-up
Cliona & Robert	27 (9, 9, 9)	Rumba	"Let You Love Me" — Rita Ora	Runner-up
Cliona & Robert	30 (10, 10, 10)	Showdance	"The Champion"—Carrie Underwood feat. Ludacris	Runner-up

== Dance chart ==
Highest scoring dance
Lowest scoring dance
No dance performed

Couple	Week 1	Week 2	Week 3	Week 4	Week 5	Week 6	Week 7	Week 8	Week 9		Week 10		Week 11		Week 12		
Mairéad & John	N/A	Waltz	Charleston	Tango	Contemporary Ballroom	Salsa (with Kai)	Quickstep	Samba	American Smooth	Freestyle (Team Future)	Paso doble	Eurothon	Jive	Viennese waltz	Charleston	Contemporary Ballroom	Showdance
Johnny & Emily	Jive	N/A	Foxtrot	Viennese waltz	Cha-cha-cha	Quickstep (with Ksenia)	Rumba	Tango	Samba	Freestyle (Team Future)	Contemporary Ballroom	Eurothon	American Smooth	Paso doble	Foxtrot	Jive	Showdance
Cliona & Robert	N/A	Quickstep	Rumba	Jive	American Smooth	Samba (with Vitali)	Tango	Waltz	Salsa	Freestyle (Team Past)	Charleston	Eurothon	Viennese waltz	Cha-cha-cha	Quickstep	Rumba	Showdance
Fred & Giulia	Cha-cha-cha	N/A	Charleston	American Smooth	Tango	Paso doble (with Emily)	Quickstep	Jive	Viennese waltz	Freestyle (Team Future)	Samba	Eurothon	Foxtrot	Salsa			
Clelia & Vitali	N/A	Jive	Tango	Salsa	Viennese waltz	Quickstep (with John)	Cha-cha-cha	Paso doble	Charleston	Freestyle (Team Past)	Waltz	Eurothon					
Denis & Valeria	American Smooth	N/A	Cha-cha-cha	Tango	Charleston	Jive (with Giulia)	Waltz	Foxtrot	Paso doble	Freestyle (Team Past)							
Peter & Ksenia	Salsa	N/A	Quickstep	Paso doble	Viennese waltz	Cha-cha-cha (with Valeria)	Charleston	American Smooth									
Demi & Kai	N/A	Cha-cha-cha	Foxtrot	Salsa	Rumba	Charleston (with Robert)	Viennese waltz										
Darren & Karen	Tango	N/A	Jive	Charleston	Salsa												
Holly & Trent	N/A	Salsa	Waltz	Foxtrot													
Eilish & Ryan	N/A	Tango	Samba														
