= Denis Bastick =

Dublin Gaelic footballer

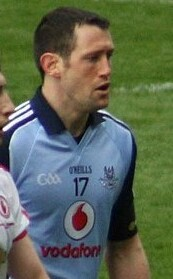
- Bastick during the 2013 National Football League final at Croke Park

Personal information
- Native name: Donnacha Bastic (Irish)
- Born: 8 May 1981 (age 45) Dublin, Ireland
- Occupation: Business advisor
- Height: 1.88 m (6 ft 2 in)

Sport
- Sport: Gaelic football
- Position: Midfield
Club
- Years: Club
- 1998–: Templeogue Synge Street
Inter-county
- Years: County
- 2009–2017: Dublin
Inter-county titles
- Leinster titles: 8
- All-Irelands: 5
- NFL: 4
- All Stars: 0

Denis Bastick (born 8 May 1981) is a Gaelic footballer who plays for Templeogue Synge Street and, formerly, for the Dublin county team.

== Biography ==
Bastick attended St. Josephs BNS Primary School in Terenure. Bastick's club side Templeogue Synge Street won promotion to the top league in Dublin football for 2007. Bastick was considered unlikely to feature in the 2007 league campaign for Dublin due to a cruciate knee injury. Bastick made his return to the inter-county scene in June 2007 by being named on the Dublin panel to Wicklow in the Leinster Junior Football Championship. Bastick won the Dublin Intermediate Football Championship with Templeogue Synge Street in 2008.

He was captain of the 2008 All-Ireland Junior Football winning Dublin team.

Bastick made his Championship debut for Dublin against Meath in June 2009. Bastick won the Leinster Senior Football Championship with Dublin in July 2011 at Croke Park against Wexford. Bastick won a previous title with Dublin in July 2009. Bastick won the All-Ireland Senior Football Championship with Dublin in September 2011 against Kerry at Croke Park.

In September 2015, Bastick won his third All-Ireland football title with Dublin after a 0–12 to 0–9 win in the final against Kerry. The week before the match his car had been stolen from the driveway, it was recovered towards the end of the week.

Bastick announced his retirement from inter-county football in November 2017.

Bastick was sent off after being issued with a straight red card shortly after taking to the field against Tyrone in the Gaelic Masters Association's 2022 All-Ireland Final.

In September 2025, it was announced that Bastick would be joining the backroom team of the recently appointed Dublin senior manager Ger Brennan.

== Media career ==
In 2012, Bastick appeared on RTÉ reality show Franc's DIY Brides where he married his fiancé Jody Hannon at Carton House in December 2011.

He appeared on the 2019 series of the Irish edition of Dancing with the Stars.

== Honours ==
Club

- Dublin Intermediate Football Championship (1): 2008

County

- Leinster Junior Football Championship (1): 2008
- All-Ireland Junior Football Championship (1): 2008
- National Football League (4): 2013, 2014, 2015, 2016
- Leinster Senior Football Championship (8): 2009, 2011, 2012, 2013, 2014, 2015, 2016, 2017
- All-Ireland Senior Football Championship (5): 2011, 2013, 2015, 2016, 2017
