= Maïa Dunphy =

Irish television producer, broadcaster and writer

- Born: Maïa Conchita Dunphy; 7 August 1976 (age 50); Dalkey, County Dublin, Ireland
- Education: Trinity College Dublin
- Occupations: Television producer, broadcaster and writer
- Years active: 2000–present
- Agent: Noel Kelly
- Known for: Maia Dunphy's What Women Want; Celebrity MasterChef: Ireland; Reality Bites; Dancing with the Stars; What Planet Are You On?
- Spouse: Johnny Vegas (m. 2011; sep. 2020)

Maïa Conchita Dunphy (born 7 August 1976) is an Irish television producer, broadcaster and writer, known predominantly for television and radio work in Ireland and the UK. She began her career working with the creative team behind Zig and Zag and Podge and Rodge in 2001 before branching out and producing her own shows, mainly documentaries.

== Early life ==
Dunphy grew up in Dalkey, County Dublin. Her father is originally from New Ross and her mother Helen from Spain. She attended school in Paris, France, before returning to Ireland to attend St Andrews College, Blackrock, Dublin.

Dunphy graduated from Trinity College Dublin, with a Bachelor of Arts degree in English and French.

== Career ==
Dunphy has spoken about her accidental route into television, originally wanting to pursue a career in wildlife conservation but was quoted as saying that on hearing her childhood heroes Zig and Zag were looking for someone to work with them, she took a diversion. After over a decade behind the camera, she stepped in front of it to author a couple of documentaries which led to two standalone series under her own name. In 2014 she won the entertainment category in the Irish Tatler Women Of The Year Awards.

=== Writing ===
Dunphy has written and produced for many comedy shows for RTÉ including Podge and Rodge and Katherine Lynch's Wagon's Den and books such as The Ballydung Bible, and has worked with Dustin the Turkey and Zig and Zag. She has written regular columns for The Dubliner magazine, State Magazine, The Irish Times, Image magazine, the Irish Independent, Insider magazine, the Sunday Independent (Ireland) and the Evening Herald amongst others.

Dunphy wrote the Mr. Tayto spoof autobiography The Man in the Jacket in 2009 which famously kept former Taoiseach Bertie Ahern off the Christmas No.1 spot in the book charts. She was a regular contributor on the RTÉ 2fm Ryan Tubridy Show and has also been a contributor on many other radio shows. Her first book penned under her own name was published in November 2017. The M Word is a book for women who happen to be mothers and was nominated for best non-fiction popular book of the year at the Irish Book Awards.

Her name appears as a songwriter on the Dustin the Turkey 2005 album, Bling When You're Minging.

In early 2022, Dunphy collaborated with screenwriter and actor Paddy C Courtney to produce a podcast Read the Room.

=== Presenting ===
In January 2012, Dunphy wrote and hosted a documentary on the Irish baby boom for RTÉ as part of the Reality Bites series. She also began appearing as a regular panelist on the Craig Doyle Live show. Her second documentary, Merlot & Me, aired on RTÉ in January 2013 to critical acclaim.

In September 2013, a four-part documentary series Maia Dunphy's What Women Want began on RTÉ. The series covered four female centric topics: the pressure on women to stay looking young and the lengths some go to in 'Forever Young'; how women really feel about sex and the importance of female sexuality in 'Best Sex Ever'; the increasing problem of anxiety and benzodiazepine use in 'Calm'; and how many Irish women are breaking away from the traditional ideals of relationships and family in 'Happily Ever After'. The series was well received.

The second series was broadcast on RTÉ2 in November and December 2014 and looked at food fads in "Food Not Fear"; the love of shopping, from designer bags to the buzz of a bargain in "Retail Therapy"; how perceptions of beauty have become skewed in "The Secrets of Attraction"; and the ongoing cult of celebrity in "Fame".

In October 2015 a new series Maïa Dunphy's Truth About.... aired on RTÉ2. In December 2014, Dunphy won the Irish Tatler Woman of the Year award for Entertainment.

In 2019 Dunphy began hosting What Planet Are You On? the popular RTÉ One series, where families are challenged to tackle the real issues around sustainability faced in our homes in the areas of water, waste, energy and food. As of 2022, the show was in its third season.

Dunphy took over as co-host of RTÉ 's Zoo Live series in May 2024.

=== Other television appearances ===
Dunphy is a regular face on many Irish shows.

In August 2013, she was a finalist on Celebrity MasterChef: Ireland.

On 18 June 2014, Dunphy and her husband Johnny Vegas took part in an episode of All Star Mr & Mrs. They won the episode and the jackpot of 30,000 for their chosen charity.

She took part in the second series of Dancing with the Stars on RTÉ One and was eliminated in week 5. She was partnered with new dancer, Polish champion Robert Rowiński.

== Personal life ==
In April 2011, she married British comedian Johnny Vegas in her mother's home town of Seville, Spain.

On 26 January 2015, Dunphy posted an image of her ultrasound, announcing that the couple were expecting their first child together. They have one son.

The couple lived in London together, but announced in May 2018 that they had separated the previous year. They reconciled in November 2018, but were again separated as of April 2020.

Dunphy is a supporter of many animal charities including Dogs Trust, Dublin Zoo, and Sepilok Orangutan Sanctuary in Sabah, where she spent a year working in 2000.. She is also an active ambassador for Our Lady's Hospice services in Ireland and many homeless and cancer charities.
