= Ireland's Fittest Family =

Irish television series

- Genre: Entertainment
- Created by: James Sexton and Davy Fitzgerald
- Presented by: Laura Fox; Mairéad Ronan; Kathryn Thomas
- Judges: Coaches: Ellen Keane; Michael Darragh MacAuley; Andrew Trimble; Davy Fitzgerald; Donncha O'Callaghan; Nina Carberry; Sonia O'Sullivan; Anna Geary; Derval O'Rourke; Alan Quinlan; Stephen Hunt; Jason Sherlock; Kenneth Egan; Nikki Symmons; Eddie O'Sullivan
- Narrated by: Darragh Maloney
- Country of origin: Ireland
- No. of seasons: 13

Production
- Camera setup: Multi-camera
- Running time: Approx. 52 minutes

Original release
- Network: RTÉ One / RTÉ2

Related
- Celebrity Bainisteoir

Ireland's Fittest Family is an Irish TV series where families from across Ireland compete in different adventure races and fitness competitions in an effort to win 15,000 euro.

Since 2014 there have been eleven seasons of the programme and five celebrity specials.

== Series Overview ==
Series	Host	Winner	Coach	Ref
1	Mairead Ronan	O'Reilly (Cavan)	Nikki Symmons	
2	Mairead Ronan	Kingston (Cork)	Derval O'Rourke	
3	Mairead Ronan	Devine (Waterford)	Davy Fitzgerald	
4	Mairead Ronan	Cummins (Tipperary)	Anna Geary	
5	Mairead Ronan	Beirne (Leitrim)	Donncha O'Callaghan	
6	Kathryn Thomas	Coney (Tyrone)	Anna Geary (2)	
7	Mairead Ronan	McSharry (Sligo)	Donncha O'Callaghan (2)	
8	Mairead Ronan	Mahoney (Wexford)	Davy Fitzgerald (2)	
9	Mairead Ronan	Kinsella (Wexford)	Anna Geary (3)	
10	Mairead Ronan	Nugent (Louth)	Davy Fitzgerald (3)	
11	Laura Fox	Stratford (Cavan)	Donncha O'Callaghan (3)	
12	Laura Fox	Cummins (Kilkenny)	Davy Fitzgerald (4)	
13	Laura Fox	McKenna (Monaghan)	Andrew Trimble	

== Season 1 ==
The first season saw coaches, Davy Fitzgerald, Kenneth Egan, Nikki Symmons and Eddie O'Sullivan take part in the competition.

In the first episode each coach began with three families.

The Heats took place in Dublin docks, the quarterfinals took place in Killary Adventure Centre, the semifinals took place in Hell and Back, the final returned to Dublin docks.

The winning family were the O'Reilly family from County Cavan coached by Nikki Symmons.

Coach	Family	County	First Round (The Heats)				Quarterfinals		Semifinals		The Final			
Coach	Family	County	#1	#2	#3	#4	QF1	QF2	SF1	SF2	The Final			
Nikki Symmons	O'Reilly	Cavan				SAFE	WIN			WIN	SAFE	SAFE	WIN	Winners
Kenneth Egan	Davern	Offaly		SAFE			SAFE			ELIM	WIN	WIN	LOSE	Runners-up
Davy Fitzgerald	McNally	Monaghan	SAFE				ELIM		WIN		SAFE	LOSE	Third place	
Nikki Symmons	Donegan	Offaly				WIN		SAFE	ELIM		LOSE	Fourth place		
Davy Fitzgerald	Ronayne	Mayo	WIN					ELIM		ELIM	Eliminated in Semifinal #2			
Kenneth Egan	Kelly	Dublin		WIN				WIN	ELIM	Eliminated in Semifinal #1				
Eddie O'Sullivan	Colclough	Wicklow			WIN			ELIM	Eliminated in Quarterfinal #2					
Eddie O'Sullivan	Houlihan	Waterford			SAFE		ELIM	Eliminated in Quarterfinal #1						
Nikki Symmons	Roche	Waterford				LOSE	Eliminated in Nikki's heat							
Eddie O'Sullivan	McQuillan	Dublin			LOSE	Eliminated in Eddie's heat								
Kenneth Egan	Farrell	Dublin		LOSE	Eliminated in Kenneth's heat									
Davy Fitzgerald	Rice	Wicklow	LOSE	Eliminated in Davy's heat										

== Season 2 ==
The second season saw coaches, Davy Fitzgerald and Kenneth Egan return. New coaches Derval O'Rourke and Jason Sherlock replaced Nikki Symmons and Eddie O'Sullivan.

The second season also saw Season 1 runners-up, the Daverns return for a second year in a row. Season 1 early eliminated family, the Rices returned for a second year in a row too, this time with their brother David replacing their brother Stephen.

The first round heats took place in Spike Island in County Cork, the second round took place in Killary Adventure Centre, the quarterfinals took place in Hell and Back, the semifinal was in Lough Key Forest Park and the final returned to Hell and Back.

The winning family were the Kingston family from County Cork coached by Derval O'Rourke who defeated the Mulhare family from County Laois also coached by O'Rourke. This remains the only time two families went head to head in the final race mentored by the same coach.

Coach	Family	County	First Round (The Heats)				Second Round		Quarterfinals		Semi- final	The Final		
Coach	Family	County	#1	#2	#3	#4	#1	#2	QF1	QF2	Semi- final	The Final		
Derval O'Rourke	Kingston	Cork		ELIM			ELIM			ELIM	ELIM	ELIM	WIN	Winners
Derval O'Rourke	Mulhare	Laois		WIN				WIN	WIN		WIN	WIN	LOSE	Runners-up
Davy Fitzgerald	Davern	Offaly				WIN	WIN			WIN	SAFE	ELIM	Third place	
Jason Sherlock	Kearney	Wexford	ELIM				SAFE		ELIM		ELIM	Eliminated in Semifinal		
Jason Sherlock	Rice	Wicklow	WIN					SAFE		ELIM	Eliminated in Quarterfinal #2			
Kenneth Egan	Hurley	Wicklow			ELIM			ELIM	ELIM	Eliminated in Quarterfinal #1				
Davy Fitzgerald	Unnamed family*	N/A				ELIM		ELIM	Eliminated in Second Round - #2					
Kenneth Egan	Shovlin	Wexford			WIN		ELIM	Eliminated in Second Round - #1						
Davy Fitzgerald	Wylde	Dublin				ELIM	Eliminated in Davy's Heat							
Kenneth Egan	Rogerson	Dublin			ELIM	Eliminated in Kenneth's Heat								
Derval O'Rourke	Behan	Dublin		ELIM	Eliminated in Derval's Heat									
Jason Sherlock	O'Flaherty	Roscommon	ELIM	Eliminated in Jason's Heat										

- *The ‘Unnamed family’ was edited from the eventual airing of the series after it was discovered, after filming, that one of the family members had been involved in criminal activity.

== Season 3 ==
The third season in 2015 saw coaches, Davy Fitzgerald and Jason Sherlock return. New coaches Alan Quinlan and Anna Geary replaced Kenneth Egan and Derval O'Rourke.

Unlike the previous two season, Season 3 saw the coaches begin with no assigned families. After the results of the heats the coaches chose who they wanted on their teams.

This season saw the Daverns return for a third year in a row, having previously finished in second and third place in Season 1 and 2, respectively. Season 2 families, the Kearneys and the Wyldes both returned to the competition for a second year in a row. The Behans from Season 2 also returned for a second year, however, they replaced their son and brother, Daryl, with their other son and brother, Thomas, on the team.

The Farren family became the first ever team from Northern Ireland to compete.

- Heat 1 was overseen by Anna Geary and Davy Fitzgerald. After winning a coin toss Anna had the first pick. She chose, the Daverns, Davy chose the O'Brien Devines, Anna chose the McGraynors and Davy was left with the Behans. Following an injury sustained in the first heat, Michele McGraynor wasn't permitted to continue in the show, forcing the McGraynors to drop out of the competition. They were replaced on Anna's team by the fastest losing family from the Heats, the Thompsons.

- Heat 2 was overseen by Alan Quinlan and Jason Sherlock. After winning a coin toss Jason had the first pick. He chose, the Kearneys, Alan chose the Naylors, Jason chose the Farrens and Alan was left with the Wyldes.

The Heats took place in Dún Laoghaire harbour, the quarterfinals took place in Killary Adventure Centre, the semifinal took place in Mayhem in Cahir, County Tipperary and the final was in Shannon Airport.

The season was won by the O'Brien Devine family from County Waterford coached by Davy Fitzgerald.

Coach	Family	County	First Round (The Heats)				Quarterfinals		Semifinals		The Final			
Coach	Family	County	#1	#2	#3	#4	QF1	QF2	SF1	SF2	The Final			
Davy Fitzgerald	O'Brien Devine	Waterford	WIN					WIN	ELIM		SAFE	SAFE	WIN	Winners
Jason Sherlock	Farren	Derry			ELIM		ELIM		WIN		SAFE	WIN	LOSE	Runners-up
Anna Geary	Davern	Offaly		ELIM			WIN			WIN	WIN	LOSE	Third place	
Jason Sherlock	Kearney	Wexford				ELIM		SAFE		ELIM	LOSE	Fourth place		
Alan Quinlan	Wylde	Dublin				WIN		ELIM		ELIM	Eliminated in Semifinal #2			
Alan Quinlan	Naylor	Mayo			WIN		SAFE		ELIM	Eliminated in Semifinal #1				
Anna Geary	Thompson	Westmeath				ELIM	BACK	ELIM	Eliminated in Quarterfinal #2					
Davy Fitzgerald	Behan	Dublin		WIN			ELIM	Eliminated in Quarterfinal #1						
Anna Geary	McGraynor	Wicklow	ELIM				QUIT	Withdrew from the competition						
-	Gill	Kildare			ELIM	Eliminated in Heat #3								
-	Beirne	Leitrim		ELIM	Eliminated in Heat #2									
-	McCann	Kildare	ELIM	Eliminated in Heat #1										

== Season 4 ==
The fourth season in 2016 saw coaches, Alan Quinlan, Anna Geary and Davy Fitzgerald return. New coach Stephen Hunt replaced Jason Sherlock.

Like the previous seasons, Season 4 saw the coaches begin with no assigned families. After the results of the heats, the coaches chose who they wanted on their teams.

This season was the first since Season 1 to have twelve brand new families who'd never competed in the show previously.

- Heat 1 was overseen by Davy Fitzgerald and Stephen Hunt. After winning a coin toss Stephen had the first pick. He chose, the McCarthys, Davy chose the Mullins family, Stephen chose the Bailys and Davy was left with the Maritz family.

- Heat 2 was overseen by Alan Quinlan and Anna Geary. After winning a coin toss Anna had the first pick. She chose, the Broadhursts, Alan chose the Ryans, Anna chose the Cummins family and Alan was left with the Griffins.

The Heats took place on the Tough Mudder course, the second round took place in Dublin docks, the quarterfinals took place in Mayhem in Cahir, County Tipperary, the semifinal took place in Killary Adventure Centre and the final returned to Dublin docks.

The season was won by the Cummins family from County Tipperary coached by Anna Geary.

Coach	Family	Billed from	First Round (The Heats)				Second Round		Quarterfinals		Semi- final	The Final		
Coach	Family	Billed from	#1	#2	#3	#4	#1	#2	QF1	QF2	Semi- final	The Final		
Anna Geary	Cummins	Tipperary			ELIM		WIN			WIN	WIN	WIN	WIN	Winners
Stephen Hunt	McCarthy	Clare	WIN				SAFE		WIN		SAFE	SAFE	LOSE	Runners-up
Alan Quinlan	Ryan	Donegal			WIN		ELIM		ELIM		ELIM	LOSE	Third place	
Stephen Hunt	Baily	Cork		WIN				WIN		ELIM	ELIM	Eliminated in Semifinal		
Davy Fitzgerald	Mullins	Limerick		ELIM				ELIM		ELIM	Eliminated in Quarterfinal #2			
Anna Geary	Broadhurst	Louth				WIN		SAFE	ELIM	Eliminated in Quarterfinal #1				
Alan Quinlan	Griffin	Kilkenny				ELIM		ELIM	Eliminated in Second Round - #2					
Davy Fitzgerald	Maritz	Dublin	ELIM				ELIM	Eliminated in Second Round - #1						
-	O'Mahony	Kerry				ELIM	Eliminated in Heat #4							
-	Boylan	Waterford			ELIM	Eliminated in Heat #3								
-	Egan	Offaly		ELIM	Eliminated in Heat #2									
-	Hollands	Dublin	ELIM	Eliminated in Heat #1										

== Season 5 ==
On 10 May 2017 it was announced that Derval O'Rourke would be returning to the coaching panel for the first time since Season 2. It was also confirmed that Anna Geary and Davy Fitzgerald would return for a third and fifth season in a row, respectively. On 1 June 2017 it was announced that rugby player Donncha O'Callaghan would join the panel as the fourth coach.

The Beirnes from County Leitrim returned to the season for a second chance at the title. They were previously eliminated in the first round in Season 3. Colm Naylor of the Naylor family from Season 3 also returned to this year's season, this time, with three brand new team members.

In a show-first, each of the heats were overseen by all four coaches. After all four heats, eight families remained; the coaches then drew lots to determine the order in which they would choose. Derval had the first pick - she chose the Cores, Anna had the second pick – she chose the Meaghers, Davy had the third pick – he chose the O'Connors and Donncha had the fourth pick he chose the Beirnes. For the second round of picks, the order was reversed meaning Donncha had the fifth pick – he chose the Smyths, Davy had the sixth pick – he chose the Naylors, Anna had the seventh pick – she chose the Guilfoyles and Derval was left the last family standing – the Hynes family.

The Heats took place at Camden Fort Meagher, the second round took place at Hell and Back, the quarterfinals took place at Cork Docks, the semifinal took place at Killary Adventure Centre and the final returned to Hell and Back.

In the second round of the competition, Cathal O'Connor of the O'Connor family suffered a fracture to his arm. He was ruled out from competing in the rest of the competition but was replaced by his older brother, Ciaran.

The season was won by the Beirne family from County Leitrim coached by Donncha O'Callaghan. They became the first family who had previously competed in the competition to come back and win the show.

Coach	Family	County	First Round (The Heats)				Second Round		Quarterfinals		Semi- final	The Final		
Coach	Family	County	#1	#2	#3	#4	#1	#2	QF1	QF2	Semi- final	The Final		
Donncha O'Callaghan	Beirne	Leitrim			WIN			SAFE	ELIM		SAFE	WIN	WIN	Winners
Davy Fitzgerald	O'Connor	Wexford				WIN	ELIM		WIN		ELIM	SAFE	LOSE	Runners-up
Donncha O'Callaghan	Smyth	Kildare	WIN				WIN			WIN	WIN	LOSE	Third place	
Derval O'Rourke	Core	Westmeath				ELIM	SAFE			ELIM	ELIM	Eliminated in Semifinal		
Anna Geary	Guilfoyle	Clare		WIN				ELIM		ELIM	Eliminated in Quarterfinal #2			
Davy Fitzgerald	Naylor	Mayo			ELIM			WIN	ELIM	Eliminated in Quarterfinal #1				
Derval O'Rourke	Hynes	Limerick	ELIM					ELIM	Eliminated in Second Round - #2					
Anna Geary	Meagher	Tipperary		ELIM			ELIM	Eliminated in Second Round - #1						
-	Brady	Meath				ELIM	Eliminated in Heat #4							
-	Nangle	Westmeath			ELIM	Eliminated in Heat #3								
-	Ó Gibne	Galway		ELIM	Eliminated in Heat #2									
-	Ryan	Kildare	ELIM	Eliminated in Heat #1										

== Season 6 ==
Applications for the sixth season opened in May 2018. For the first time ever, all four coaches from the previous year, Anna Geary, Davy Fitzgerald, Derval O'Rourke and Donncha O'Callaghan, returned for a second year in a row. This will be the first time all four coaches will have won a previous season; meaning that the coach that won this season will be the first coach to ever win twice. On 30 July 2018 it was announced that Mairéad Ronan would step back as host from this season to give birth to her third child. Kathryn Thomas replaced her as host.

This was the first season to ever start with more than twelve families. Twenty families featured in the first episode, with eight being eliminated before its conclusion. It was also the first season since Season 4 not to feature any families who had previously competed in the competition.

Following the first round, twelve families remained. The coaches drew lots to determine the order of selection. Anna had the first pick - she chose the Finnegan Hogans, Donncha had the second pick - he chose the Lawlors, Davy had the third pick - he chose the Pierses and Derval had the fourth pick - she chose the Cartys. For the second round of picks, the order was reversed meaning Derval had the fifth pick - she chose the Finnegans, Davy had the sixth pick - he chose the McDonalds, Donncha had the seventh pick - he chose the Lallys and Anna had the eighth pick - she chose the Coneys. For the final round of selection, Anna had the ninth pick - she chose the McDonnells, Donncha had the tenth pick - he chose the Furlongs, Derval had the eleventh pick - she chose the Sinnotts, which meant Davy was left with the Lipinskis.

The first round was spread out over two locations the 'Battle of the Beach' took place on Dollymount, 'Vertigo' came from on top of the Irish Life Centre. The second round came from an abandoned tannery in Portlaw. The Quarterfinals were held in Dublin Docklands, the Semifinals were in Hell & Back and the Grand Final was held for the first time in Croke Park.

The season was won by the Coney family from County Tyrone coached by Anna Geary, making her the first coach to win twice.

Coach	Family	County	First Round (The Qualifiers)		Second Round (The Heats)				Quarterfinals		Semifinals		The Final			
Coach	Family	County	Battle of the Beach	Vertigo	#1	#2	#3	#4	QF1	QF2	SF1	SF2	The Final			
Anna Geary	Coney	Tyrone	11th	ELIM^{2}			WIN		WIN		WIN		SAFE	WIN	WIN	Winners
Davy Fitzgerald	McDonald	Laois	1st			ELIM			SAFE			WIN	ELIM	SAFE	LOSE	Runners-up
Donncha O'Callaghan	Lawlor	Limerick	2nd					ELIM		ELIM	ELIM		WIN	LOSE	Third place	
Anna Geary	Finnegan Hogan	Cork	5th	ELIM^{6}			ELIM			WIN		ELIM	ELIM	Fourth place		
Donncha O'Callaghan	Lally	Dublin	8th	BYE^{4}				WIN	ELIM			ELIM	Eliminated in Semifinal #2			
Davy Fitzgerald	Pierse	Kerry	4th			WIN				SAFE	ELIM	Eliminated in Semifinal #1				
Derval O'Rourke	Finnegan	Cork	13th	ELIM^{5}	WIN					ELIM	Eliminated in Quarterfinal #2					
Derval O'Rourke	Sinnott	Wexford	18th	ELIM^{7}	ELIM				ELIM	Eliminated in Quarterfinal #1						
Donncha O'Callaghan	Furlong	Donegal	6th	ELIM^{3}				ELIM	Eliminated in Donncha's Heat							
Anna Geary	McDonnell	Mayo	9th	ELIM^{1}			ELIM	Eliminated in Anna's Heat								
Davy Fitzgerald	Lipinski	Tipperary	20th	ELIM^{8}		ELIM	Eliminated in Davy's Heat									
Derval O'Rourke	Carty	Sligo	3rd		ELIM	Eliminated in Derval's Heat										
-	Flynn	Galway	12th	ELIM^{8}	Eliminated by the Lipinski family											
-	Leonard	Limerick	15th	ELIM^{7}	Eliminated by the Sinnott family											
-	Ryan	Dublin	10th	ELIM^{6}	Eliminated by the Finnegan Hogan family											
-	Rooney	Donegal	14th	ELIM^{5}	Eliminated by the Finnegan family											
-	Dunne	Louth	19th	QUIT^{4}	Withdrew from the competition											
-	McCarthy	Dublin	17th	ELIM^{3}	Eliminated by the Furlong family											
-	Jones	Dublin	16th	ELIM^{2}	Eliminated by the Coney family											
-	McLoughlin	Kildare	7th	ELIM^{1}	Eliminated by the McDonnell family											

== Season 7 ==
In April 2019, the series was confirmed to be returning for a seventh year with Mairéad Ronan resuming hosting duties following her departure from the show the previous year to give birth. For the third year-in-a row, all four coaches, Anna Geary, Davy Fitzgerald, Derval O'Rourke and Donncha O'Callaghan, returned to the competition.

This season began with fifteen families. For the second year-in-a-row, none of the families had ever competed in the competition before.

Following the first round, twelve families remained. The coaches drew lots to determine the order of selection. Davy had the first pick - he chose the Hogans, Anna had the second pick - she chose the Mahers, Derval had the third pick - she chose the Dinans and Donncha had the fourth pick - he chose the O'Driscolls. For the second round of picks, the order was reversed meaning Donncha had the fifth pick - he chose the McSharrys, Derval had the sixth pick - she chose the Murphys, Anna had the seventh pick - she chose the Uí Bhraonáin family and Davy had the eighth pick - he chose the McComiskeys. For the final round of selection, Davy had the ninth pick - he chose the Cookes, Anna had the tenth pick - she chose the McArdles, Derval had the eleventh pick - she chose the Mandiangus, which meant Donncha was left with the Prendergasts.

The first round took place across two locations in Dublin. The three heats happened in Poolbeg while the eliminators took place at Kilternan ski-slope. The second round took place in Sligo Airport and Strandhill beach. The quarterfinals took place at Hell & Back, while the semi-finals came from Dublin Docklands. The final came from Croke Park for the second year-in-a-row.

The season was won by the McSharry family from County Sligo coached by Donncha O'Callaghan, making him the second coach to pull off a second win.

Coach	Family	County	First Round (The Qualifiers)			Second Round		Quarterfinals		Semifinals		The Final			
Coach	Family	County	#1	#2	#3	#1	#2	QF1	QF2	SF1	SF2	The Final			
Donncha O'Callaghan	McSharry	Sligo	WIN				WIN	WIN			WIN	SAFE	WIN	WIN	Winners
Davy Fitzgerald	Hogan	Wexford		WIN		WIN		SAFE		ELIM		ELIM	SAFE	LOSE	Runners-up
Derval O'Rourke	Dinan	Cork	SAFE			WIN			SAFE	WIN		WIN	LOSE	Third place	
Anna Geary	Maher	Laois		SAFE			WIN	ELIM			ELIM	ELIM	Fourth place		
Derval O'Rourke	Murphy	Wexford			SAFE	ELIM^{1}			WIN		ELIM	Eliminated in Semifinal #2			
Anna Geary	Uí Bhraonáin	Carlow		SAFE			ELIM^{2}		ELIM	ELIM	Eliminated in Semifinal #1				
Donncha O'Callaghan	Prendergast	Limerick	ELIM				ELIM^{1}		ELIM	Eliminated in Quarterfinal #2					
Derval O'Rourke	Mandiangu	Dublin			SAFE	ELIM^{2}		ELIM	Eliminated in Quarterfinal #1						
Donncha O'Callaghan	O'Driscoll	Dublin			WIN		ELIM^{2}	Eliminated in Second Round - #2							
Anna Geary	McArdle	Down			ELIM		ELIM^{1}	Eliminated in Second Round - #2							
Davy Fitzgerald	McComiskey	Down		ELIM		ELIM^{2}	Eliminated in Second Round - #1								
Davy Fitzgerald	Cooke	Antrim	SAFE			ELIM^{1}	Eliminated in Second Round - #1								
-	Farmer	Cork			ELIM	Eliminated in the Heat #3									
-	Mullen	Tipperary		ELIM	Eliminated in the Heat #2										
-	Hogan	Limerick	ELIM	Eliminated in the Heat #1											

== Season 8 ==
In May 2020, the series was confirmed to be returning for an eighth edition with Mairéad Ronan returning as host. For the fourth year-in-a row, all four coaches, Anna Geary, Davy Fitzgerald, Derval O'Rourke and Donncha O'Callaghan, were announced to be returning to the competition. The season didn't air during its usual autumn schedule, instead it was pushed to January 2021 in what was Dancing with the Stars' slot which wasn't able to air due to the COVID-19 pandemic.

This season began with sixteen families. For the third year-in-a-row, none of the families had ever competed in the competition before.

For the first time since Season 2, the coaches selected the families they wanted to work with prior to meeting them. Meaning, unlike the previous five seasons, every family was assigned to a coach. Due to the COVID-19 pandemic, the entire season was filmed in Hell & Back's course in Killruddery, County Wicklow.

The season was won by the Mahoney family from County Wexford coached by Davy Fitzgerald, making him the third coach to get a second win.

Coach	Family	County	First Round (The Heats)								Quarterfinals		Semifinal		The Final			
Coach	Family	County	#1		#2		#3		#4		QF1	QF2	SF1	SF2	The Final			
Davy Fitzgerald	Mahoney	Wexford	SAFE	WIN							SAFE		ELIM		WIN	WIN	WIN	Winners
Donncha O'Callaghan	Allen	Tipperary			SAFE	WIN						SAFE		ELIM	SAFE	SAFE	LOSE	Runners-up
Derval O'Rourke	Cullen	Wexford					SAFE	ELIM			WIN			WIN	ELIM	LOSE	Third place	
Derval O'Rourke	Miley	Kildare			WIN	ELIM					ELIM		WIN		ELIM	Fourth place		
Derval O'Rourke	O'Rourke	Galway	WIN	ELIM								ELIM		ELIM	Eliminated in Semifinal #2			
Derval O'Rourke	Kulczynski	Clare							WIN	ELIM		WIN	ELIM	Eliminated in Semifinal #1				
Anna Geary	Bracken	Westmeath							SAFE	WIN		ELIM	Eliminated in Quarterfinal #2					
Anna Geary	Doyle	Derry					WIN	WIN			ELIM	Eliminated in Quarterfinal #1						
Donncha O'Callaghan	O'Halloran	Clare							SAFE	ELIM	Eliminated in Heat #4							
Davy Fitzgerald	Kelly	Antrim							LOSE	Eliminated immediately in Heat #4								
Donncha O'Callaghan	Donnelly	Longford					SAFE	ELIM	Eliminated in Heat #3									
Davy Fitzgerald	McDonagh	Mayo					LOSE	Eliminated immediately in Heat #3										
Davy Fitzgerald	Cody	Kilkenny			SAFE	ELIM	Eliminated in Heat #2											
Anna Geary	O'Neill	Meath			LOSE	Eliminated immediately in Heat #2												
Donncha O'Callaghan	Doyle	Longford	SAFE	ELIM	Eliminated in Heat #1													
Anna Geary	Thompson	Wicklow	LOSE	Eliminated immediately in Heat #1														

== Season 9 ==
In May 2021, the series was confirmed to be returning for a ninth season with Mairéad Ronan returning as host for her eighth season. For the fifth year-in-a row, all four coaches, Anna Geary, Davy Fitzgerald, Derval O'Rourke and Donncha O'Callaghan, were announced to be returning to the competition.

Similar to the previous year, the season began with sixteen families and the coaches selected the families they wanted to work with prior to meeting them. Once again, due to the COVID-19 pandemic, the entire season was filmed in Hell & Back's course in Killruddery, County Wicklow. In a small twist, for Heats 3 and 4 there was no immediate elimination after the first challenge. Instead, the families were competing in the first challenge to automatically book a place in the quarterfinal. Therefore, both losing families in the second and third challenge in Heats 3 and 4 were eliminated.

For the fourth year-in-a-row, none of the families had ever competed in the competition before.

The season was won by the Kinsella family from County Wexford coached by Anna Geary, making her the first coach to win three times.

Coach	Family	County	First Round (The Heats)								Quarterfinals		Semifinal		The Final			
Coach	Family	County	#1		#2		#3		#4		QF1	QF2	SF1	SF2	The Final			
Anna Geary	Kinsella	Wexford							WIN			WIN		WIN	SAFE	SAFE	WIN	Winners
Donncha O'Callaghan	McIntyre	Tipperary					SAFE	ELIM			WIN		WIN		WIN	WIN	LOSE	Runners-up
Derval O'Rourke	Greenan	Cavan	SAFE	ELIM							SAFE			ELIM	ELIM	LOSE	Third place	
Anna Geary	Cuddy	Roscommon					WIN					SAFE	ELIM		ELIM	Fourth place		
Donncha O'Callaghan	Forde	Kildare							SAFE	ELIM		ELIM		ELIM	Eliminated in Semifinal #2			
Davy Fitzgerald	Bissett	Dublin	WIN	WIN							ELIM		ELIM	Eliminated in Semifinal #1				
Davy Fitzgerald	O'Shea	Clare			SAFE	WIN						ELIM	Eliminated in Quarterfinal #2					
Anna Geary	O'Brien	Cork			WIN	ELIM					ELIM	Eliminated in Quarterfinal #1						
Davy Fitzgerald	Roche	Clare							SAFE	ELIM	Eliminated in Heat #4							
Derval O'Rourke	Farrell	Kildare							SAFE	LOSE	Eliminated in Heat #4							
Davy Fitzgerald	McDonald	Antrim					SAFE	ELIM	Eliminated in Heat #3									
Derval O'Rourke	Corcoran	Meath					SAFE	LOSE	Eliminated in Heat #3									
Donncha O'Callaghan	Mooney	Dublin			SAFE	ELIM	Eliminated in Heat #2											
Derval O'Rourke	Sexton	Kildare			LOSE	Eliminated immediately in Heat #2												
Anna Geary	McCarthy	Cork	SAFE	ELIM	Eliminated in Heat #1													
Donncha O'Callaghan	Lehane	Cork	LOSE	Eliminated immediately in Heat #1														

== Season 10 ==
In May 2022, it was confirmed that the series would return for a tenth season. On 27 May, Derval O'Rourke announced she was leaving the show after six non-consecutive seasons. On 31 May, it was announced that jockey Nina Carberry would replace her. It was also confirmed that Mairead Ronan would return as host for her ninth season and Davy Fitzgerald, Anna Geary and Donncha O'Callaghan would return as coaches for a tenth, eighth and sixth time, respectively.

This was the first season since Season 5 to have families who competed previously return to take part again. The McNallys, who finished in third place in Season 1, returned alongside the Rice family who competed in both Seasons 1 and 2. The Finnegans from Season 6 also returned, this time with Lauren and Sarah, who replaced their mother, Nicola and brother, Adam who took part previously.

The season was won by the Nugent family from County Louth coached by Davy Fitzgerald, making him the second coach to win three times.

Coach	Family	County	First Round (The Heats)				Quarterfinals		Semifinal		The Final			
Coach	Family	County	#1	#2	#3	#4	QF1	QF2	SF1	SF2	The Final			
Davy Fitzgerald	Nugent	Louth		WIN			WIN		WIN		SAFE	WIN	WIN	Winners
Anna Geary	Fitzsimons	Wicklow	ELIM					ELIM		WIN	WIN	WIN	LOSE	Runners-up
Donncha O'Callaghan	Finnegan	Cork			ELIM			WIN		ELIM	ELIM	LOSE	Third place	
Anna Geary	Gallagher	Donegal		ELIM			ELIM		ELIM		ELIM	Fourth place		
Nina Carberry	Rice	Wicklow				WIN		SAFE		ELIM	Eliminated in Semifinal #2			
Anna Geary	McNally	Monaghan			WIN		SAFE		ELIM	Eliminated in Semifinal #1				
Davy Fitzgerald	Doran	Wexford	WIN					ELIM	Eliminated in Quarterfinal #2					
Donncha O'Callaghan	Cooney	Cork				ELIM	ELIM	Eliminated in Quarterfinal #1						
Davy Fitzgerald	Greene	Wicklow				ELIM	Eliminated in Heat #4							
Anna Geary	Caddow	Dublin				LOSE	Eliminated in Heat #4							
Davy Fitzgerald	Regan	Sligo			ELIM	Eliminated in Heat #3								
Nina Carberry	Peters	Waterford			LOSE	Eliminated in Heat #3								
Donncha O'Callaghan	Sheehan	Limerick		ELIM	Eliminated in Heat #2									
Nina Carberry	Burns	Waterford		LOSE	Eliminated in Heat #2									
Nina Carberry	Finnegan	Meath	ELIM	Eliminated in Heat #1										
Donncha O'Callaghan	Gallagher	Laois	LOSE	Eliminated in Heat #1										

== Season 11 ==
In April 2023, host, Mairéad Ronan revealed on her podcast that the show was returning for an eleventh season however she would not be coming back as presenter. On 8 June 2023, it was announced that, RTÉ 2fm DJ, Laura Fox would replace Ronan as host while Olympic athlete, Sonia O'Sullivan would take over from, coach, Anna Geary who left the show to give birth to her first child.

The season was won by the Stratford family from County Cavan coached by Donncha O'Callaghan, making him the third coach to win three times.

Coach	Family	County	First Round (The Heats)				Quarterfinals		Semifinal		The Final			
Coach	Family	County	#1	#2	#3	#4	QF1	QF2	SF1	SF2	The Final			
Donncha O'Callaghan	Stratford	Cavan				WIN		WIN		WIN	WIN	WIN	WIN	Winners
Nina Carberry	Murphy	Carlow			WIN		WIN		WIN		SAFE	SAFE	LOSE	Runners-up
Donncha O'Callaghan	Bonnar	Waterford	ELIM				ELIM		ELIM		ELIM	LOSE	Third place	
Sonia O'Sullivan	Byrnes	Tipperary		ELIM			SAFE			ELIM	ELIM	Fourth place		
Nina Carberry	O'Regan	Kerry	WIN					SAFE		ELIM	Eliminated in Semifinal #2			
Sonia O'Sullivan	Maher	Offaly				ELIM		ELIM	ELIM	Eliminated in Semifinal #1				
Davy Fitzgerald	Farrell	Louth			ELIM			ELIM	Eliminated in Quarterfinal #2					
Donncha O'Callaghan	Peters	Waterford		WIN			ELIM	Eliminated in Quarterfinal #1						
Davy Fitzgerald	Penny Taylor	Meath				ELIM	Eliminated in Heat #4							
Nina Carberry	McNamara	Roscommon				LOSE	Eliminated in Heat #4							
Donncha O'Callaghan	McCarthy	Cork			ELIM	Eliminated in Heat #3								
Sonia O'Sullivan	Gallagher	Laois			QUIT	Withdrew from the competition								
Davy Fitzgerald	Murray	Dublin		ELIM	Eliminated in Heat #2									
Nina Carberry	Kearns	Limerick		LOSE	Eliminated in Heat #2									
Sonia O'Sullivan	Noonan	Meath	ELIM	Eliminated in Heat #1										
Davy Fitzgerald	Heaney	Tyrone	LOSE	Eliminated in Heat #1										

== Season 12 ==
In June 2024 RTÉ announced that the series would return for a twelfth season with coaches Davy Fitzgerald, Donncha O'Callaghan and Sonia O'Sullivan returning for a twelfth, eighth and second season, respectively. Nina Carberry departed the programme following her election to the European Parliament, however Anna Geary was announced to return for her ninth season having missed the previous series while on maternity leave.

On the 22 October RTÉ announced that the transmission of the season had been postponed due to the death of a Cillian Flaherty, a contestant who was due to appear in the show. The season was rescheduled to 2025, in a new Saturday evening slot on 4 January 2025.

Lariche Mandiangu who previously competed in 2019 with her mother and two brothers returned to take part this season with her husband and children as the Parsons family. The Cooney family from Cork previously took part in Season 10, reaching the Quarterfinals.

Coach	Family	County	First Round (The Heats)				Quarterfinals		Semifinal		The Final			
Coach	Family	County	#1	#2	#3	#4	QF1	QF2	SF1	SF2	The Final			
Davy Fitzgerald	Cummins	Kilkenny			ELIM		WIN			WIN	SAFE	SAFE	WIN	Winners
Anna Geary	Magner	Cork	ELIM				ELIM		ELIM		WIN	WIN	LOSE	Runners-up
Davy Fitzgerald	Ferns	Clare				ELIM		ELIM	WIN		ELIM	LOSE	Third place	
Davy Fitzgerald	O'Connell	Waterford	WIN					WIN		ELIM	ELIM	Fourth place		
Sonia O'Sullivan	Adamowicz	Cork		WIN				ELIM	BACK	ELIM	Eliminated in Semifinal #2			
Donncha O'Callaghan	Flaherty	Dublin		ELIM			SAFE		ELIM	Eliminated in Semifinal #1				
Anna Geary	Cooney	Cork				WIN		SAFE	QUIT	Withdrew from the competition				
Sonia O'Sullivan	Hogan	Limerick			WIN		ELIM	Eliminated in Quarterfinal #1						
Sonia O'Sullivan	Dempsey	Cork				ELIM	Eliminated in Heat #4							
Donncha O'Callaghan	McGuire	Wicklow				LOSE	Eliminated in Heat #4							
Anna Geary	O'Brien	Westmeath			ELIM	Eliminated in Heat #3								
Donncha O'Callaghan	Collins	Tipperary			LOSE	Eliminated in Heat #3								
Anna Geary	Fagan	Wicklow		ELIM	Eliminated in Heat #2									
Davy Fitzgerald	McLoughlin	Laois		LOSE	Eliminated in Heat #2									
Donncha O'Callaghan	Parsons	Dublin	ELIM	Eliminated in Heat #1										
Sonia O'Sullivan	O'Neill	Meath	LOSE	Eliminated in Heat #1										

== Season 13 ==
A new format for the show was announced this time there was six coaches instead of 4, Donncha O'Callaghan, Davy Fitzgerald and Anna Geary returned but were joined by Paralympic Champion swimmer Ellen Keane, All Ireland champion Michael Darragh MacAuley and Irish rugby legend Andrew Trimble. Each coach had two families and the format for the heats were the coaches would take on each other, with a newcomer taking on a experienced coach.

Family	Coach	County	Result
McKenna	Trimble	Monaghan	Winners
Carr	Geary	Dublin	Runners-up
Linehan	O'Callaghan	Cork	Eliminated in final 3rd
McDonagh	Fitzgerald	Mayo	Eliminated in Final 4th
Walshe	MacAuley	Cork	Eliminated in Semi Finals
Smith	Fitzgerald	Louth	Eliminated in Semi Finals
Stuart	Keane	Dublin	Eliminated in Quarterfinals
Hilliard	Trimble	Kildare	Eliminated in Quarterfinals
Bryne	MacAuley	Dublin	Eliminated in Quarterfinals
Barnaville	Keane	Tipperary	Eliminated in Heat
Hickey	O'Callaghan	Dublin	Eliminated in Heat
McClements	Geary	Down	Eliminated in Heat

== Series 14 ==
All six coaches returned for series 14 alongside Laura Fox. The season started on 1 November 2026 in Haulbowline, Cork.

Family	Coach	County	Result
McCourt	Geary	Cork	Qualified for Quarterfinals
Tierney	Geary	Galway	Qualified for Quarterfinals
Ó Cathasaigh	Trimble	Dublin	Qualified for Quarterfinals
McGilligan	Trimble	Derry	Eliminated in Heat 1
Healy	Fitzgerald	Cork	Uponcoming
Treacy	Fitzgerald	Tipperary	Uponcoming
Gibson	MacAuley	Donegal	Uponcoming
Muwaniri	MacAuley	Laois	Uponcoming
Power	Keane	Cork	Uponcoming
McKenna	Keane	Donegal	Uponcoming
Daly	O'Callaghan	Carlow	Uponcoming
Collins	O'Callaghan	Cork	Uponcoming

== Celebrity specials ==
Coach	Family	The Arena	Hanging Tough	Final Race
Donncha O'Callaghan	Sheahan	3rd	1st	Winners
Davy Fitzgerald	Walsh	2nd	2nd	Runners-up
Derval O'Rourke	Price	1st	3rd	Eliminated
Anna Geary	Redmond	4th	Eliminated	

=== 2019 ===
On 31 December 2019, following the seventh season, the Christmas special returned for a second year in a row. Each family taking part was awarded €1,000 for a charity of their choice.

The celebrities which took part were;

- Brian Dowling - TV presenter
- Dave O'Sullivan - Fair City actor
- Jacqui Hurley - RTÉ Sport presenter
- Rob & Marian Heffernan - Olympic athletes

The show was won by Rob & Marian Heffernan and their family. They won €10,000 for their charity of choice.

Coach	Family	Event #1	Event #2	Final Race
Derval O'Rourke	Heffernan	1st	1st	Winners
Anna Geary	Hurley	2nd	2nd	Runners-up
Davy Fitzgerald	Dowling	3rd	3rd	Eliminated
Donncha O'Callaghan	O'Sullivan	4th	Eliminated	

=== 2020 ===
On 28 December 2020, before the launch of the eighth season, the Christmas special returned for a third year in a row. Each family taking part was awarded €1,000 for a charity of their choice.

The celebrities which took part were;

- James Kavanagh - Social media influencer and television personality
- John Sharpson - Home School Hub 'muinteoir'
- Katie Walsh, Ruby Walsh & Nina Carberry - Jockeys
- Lynn Ruane - Politician

The show was won by the Walshes. They won €10,000 for their charity of choice.

Coach	Family	Event #1	Event #2	Final Race
Davy Fitzgerald	Walsh	1st	1st	Winners
Anna Geary	Sharpson	2nd	4th	Runners-up
Derval O'Rourke	Ruane	3rd	3rd	Eliminated
Donncha O'Callaghan	Kavanagh	Didn't finish	2nd	Eliminated

=== 2021 ===
On 27 December 2021, following the ninth season, the Christmas special returned for a fourth year in a row. Each family taking part was awarded €1,000 for a charity of their choice.

The celebrities which took part were;

- David and Stephen Flynn - The Happy Pear owners
- Grainne Gallanagh - Former Miss Universe Ireland
- Neil Delamere - Comedian
- Sinead Quinlan - The Den reporter

The show was won by David and Stephen Flynn and their family. They won €10,000 for their charity of choice.

Coach	Family	Event #1	Event #2	Final Race
Donncha O'Callaghan	Flynn	1st	1st	Winners
Davy Fitzgerald	Gallanagh	2nd	2nd	Runners-up
Derval O'Rourke	Delamere	3rd	3rd	Eliminated
Anna Geary	Quinlan	4th	Eliminated	

=== 2022 ===
On 28 December 2022, following the tenth season, the Christmas special returned for a fifth year in a row. Each family taking part was awarded €1,000 for a charity of their choice.

The celebrities which took part were;

- Bláthnaid Treacy - TV and radio presenter
- Emma Doran - Comedian
- Glenda Gilson - TV presenter
- Tadhg Fleming - Social media personality

The show was won by Tadhg Fleming and his family. They won €10,000 for their charity of choice.

Coach	Family	Event #1	Event #2	Final Race
Donncha O'Callaghan	Fleming	2nd	1st	Winners
Nina Carberry	Gilson	3rd	2nd	Runners-up
Anna Geary	Treacy	1st	3rd	Eliminated
Davy Fitzgerald	Doran	4th	Eliminated	

== Coaches ==
Coach	Season 1	Season 2	Season 3	Season 4	Season 5	Season 6	Season 7	Season 8	Season 9	Season 10	Season 11	Season 12	Season 13
Davy Fitzgerald	Coach												
Donncha O'Callaghan						Coach							
Anna Geary			Coach									Coach	
Ellen Keane													Coach
Andrew Trimble													Coach
Michael Darragh MacAuley													Coach
Sonia O'Sullivan											Coach		
Nina Carberry										Coach			
Derval O'Rourke		Coach			Coach								
Stephen Hunt				Coach									
Alan Quinlan			Coach										
Jason Sherlock		Coach											
Kenneth Egan	Coach												
Nikki Symmons	Coach												
Eddie O'Sullivan	Coach												

== Hosts ==
Host	Season 1	Season 2	Season 3	Season 4	Season 5	Season 6	Season 7	Season 8	Season 9	Season 10	Season 11	Season 12
Laura Fox											Host	
Mairéad Ronan	Host						Host					
Kathryn Thomas						Host						

== Noteworthy contestants ==
Name	Season	Coach	County	Result	Sport	Info
Tom Devine	3	Davy	Waterford	Winner	Hurling	Waterford hurler
Keith Beirne	3	N/A	Leitrim	First Round	Gaelic football	Leitrim footballer
Keith Beirne	5	Donnacha	Leitrim	Winner	Gaelic football	Leitrim footballer
Amy Broadhurst	4	Anna	Louth	Quarterfinalist	Boxing	World Champion & Commonwealth Champion
Colin Egan	4	N/A	Offaly	First Round	Hurling	Offaly hurler
Mia Griffin	4	Alan	Killkenny	Second Round	Cycling	Olympian and European Medalist
Lara Maritz	4	Davy	Dublin	Second Round	Cricket	Played In 2018 Cricket World Cup aged 17
Mona McSharry	7	Donnacha	Sligo	Winner	Swimming	2020, 2024 Olympian, 2024 Olympic Bronze Medalist (bronze)
Colm Bonnar	11	Donnacha	Waterford	Third Place	Hurling	1991 & 1989 All Ireland Winner 1988 All Star
Tommy Carr	13	Anna	Dublin	Runner Up	Gaelic football	Former Dublin Footballer
Simon Carr	13	Anna	Dublin	Runner Up	Tennis	Represented Ireland at the Davis Cup
Elizabeth Carr	13	Anna	Dublin	Runner Up	Triathlon	Represented Ireland in Triathlon
