= Emily Barker (dancer) =

British dancer and choreographer (born 1996)

- Born: 13 December 1996 (age 29); Nottingham, United Kingdom
- Occupations: Dancer; Choreographer
- Known for: Dancing with the Stars (Irish series)

Emily Barker (born 13 December 1996) is a British dancer and choreographer. She is a professional dancer on the Irish version of Dancing with the Stars.

== Career ==
In 2016, Barker toured with the Burn the Floor tour.

In 2017 and 2018, she performed alongside Strictly Come Dancing professional Giovanni Pernice in his UK & Ireland tours.

In 2017 and 2018, she also toured with Strictly Come Dancing contestants Harry Judd and Louis Smith, along with Aston Merrygold's UK tour, Rip it Up.

== Dancing with the Stars ==
In 2017, Barker was announced as one of the professional dancers for the first series of the Irish version of Dancing with the Stars. She was partnered with Big Brother UK runner-up, Hughie Maughan. They were the first couple eliminated from the competition.

In 2018, Barker was partnered with Olympic medal-winning race walker, Rob Heffernan. They reached the quarterfinals of the competition, eventually finishing in fifth place.

In 2019, Barker was partnered with actor, Johnny Ward. They reached the final of the competition, eventually finishing as joint runners-up to Mairéad Ronan and John Nolan.

In 2020, Barker partnered, former Kilkenny hurler, Aidan Fogarty. They reached the final, finishing joint runners-up to Lottie Ryan and Pasquale La Rocca. This was Barker’s second time in a row to reach the final, making her the second professional dancer to do this.

In 2022, Barker partnered former RTÉ newsreader, Aengus Mac Grianna. They reached the fifth week of the competition, finishing in 10th place. On 10 March, it was announced that Barker would partner Jordan Conroy for week 10 when his regular professional partner, Salome Chachua, tested positive for COVID-19.

In 2023, Barker partnered RTÉ 2fm Breakfast presenter, Carl Mullan. They reached the final and won the competition, making this Barker's first win since she joined the show in 2017. Barker also became the first professional dancer to make three non-consecutive finals. On 5 September 2023, Barker announced via Instagram that she was leaving the show.

Series	Partner	Place
1	Hughie Maughan	11th
2	Rob Heffernan	5th
3	Johnny Ward	2nd
4	Aidan Fogarty	2nd
5	Aengus Mac Grianna	10th
6	Carl Mullan	1st

Highest and Lowest Scoring Per Dance

Dance	Partner	Highest	Partner	Lowest
American Smooth	Johnny Ward	27	Carl Mullan	20
Cha-cha-cha	Johnny Ward	20	Hughie Maughan	15
Charleston	Carl Mullan	28	Aengus Mac Grianna	16
Contemporary Ballroom	Johnny Ward	30	Aidan Fogarty	23
Foxtrot	Johnny Ward	28	Carl Mullan	16
Jive	Johnny Ward	30	Marty Morrissey^{1}	14
Paso Doble	Carl Mullan	29	Fred Cooke^{1}	14
Quickstep	Carl Mullan	26		
Rumba	Johnny Ward	28	Aidan Fogarty	23
Salsa	Aidan Fogarty	27	Rob Heffernan	21
Samba	Johnny Ward	28	Aengus Mac Grianna	11
Showdance	Johnny Ward; Carl Mullan	30		
Tango	Johnny Ward	29	Rob Heffernan	18
Viennese Waltz	Aidan Fogarty	26	Carl Mullan	22
Waltz	Hughie Maughan	17	Aengus Mac Grianna	11

^{1} These scores was awarded during Switch-Up Week.

=== Series 1 ===
Celebrity partner
Hughie Maughan; Average: 16; Place: 11th

Week No.	Dance/Song	Judges' score			Total	Result
Week No.	Dance/Song	Redmond	Barry	Benson	Total	Result
1	Cha-cha-cha / "King"	4	5	6	15	No elimination
2	No dance performed	-	-	-	-	No elimination
3	Waltz / "What the World Needs Now Is Love"	5	6	6	17	Eliminated

=== Series 2 ===
Celebrity partner
Rob Heffernan; Average: 20.9; Place: 5th

Week No.	Dance/Song	Judges' score			Total	Result
Week No.	Dance/Song	Redmond	Barry	Benson	Total	Result
1	Jive / "One Way or Another (Teenage Kicks)"	5	6	6	17	No elimination
2	No dance performed	-	-	-	-	No elimination
3	Tango / "I'm Gonna Be (500 Miles)"	6	6	6	18	Safe
4	Samba / "Jump in the Line (Shake, Señora)"	6	7	7	20	Safe
5	Viennese Waltz / "Perfect"	8	8	9	25	Safe
6	Jive / "Crocodile Rock"	4	4	6	14	No elimination Switch-Up Week with Marty Morrissey
7	Salsa / "Livin' la Vida Loca"	7	7	7	21	Safe
8	Cha-cha-cha / "Ice Ice Baby"	6	6	6	18	Safe
9	Contemporary Ballroom / "Hymn for the Weekend"; Team Dance / "Party Rock Anthem"	8; 8	8; 8	8; 9	24; 25	Safe
10	Foxtrot / "Any Dream Will Do"; Swing-a-thon / "You Can't Stop the Beat"	8 Awarded	8; 2	9 Points	25; 27	Eliminated

=== Series 3 ===
Celebrity partner
Johnny Ward; Average: 25.9; Place: 2nd

Week No.	Dance/Song	Judges' score			Total	Result
Week No.	Dance/Song	Redmond	Barry	Benson	Total	Result
1	Jive / "Johnny B. Goode"	7	7	8	22	No elimination
2	No dance performed	-	-	-	-	No elimination
3	Foxtrot / "This Town"	6	6	7	19	Safe
4	Viennese Waltz / "Kiss from a Rose"	8	8	8	24	Safe
5	Cha-cha-cha / "Picture of You"	7	6	7	20	Safe
6	Paso Doble / "Y viva Espana"	4	5	5	14	No elimination Switch-Up Week with Fred Cooke
7	Rumba / "Say You Won't Let Go"	9	9	10	28	Safe
8	Tango / "Viva la Vida"	9	10	10	29	Safe
9	Samba / "Shape of You (Remix)"; Team Dance / "Born This Way"	9; 8	9; 9	10; 9	28; 26	Safe
10	Contemporary Ballroom / "Rise Like a Phoenix"; Euro-thon / "Making Your Mind Up"	10; Awarded	10; 5	10; Points	30; 35	Safe
11	American Smooth / "Power Over Me"; Paso Doble / "Kashmir"	9; 9	9; 9	9; 10	27; 28	Bottom two
12	Foxtrot / "This Town"; Jive / "Johnny B. Goode"; Showdance / "Bad Man"	9; 10; 10	9; 10; 10	10; 10; 10	28; 30; 30	Runners-up

=== Series 4 ===
Celebrity partner
Aidan Fogarty; Average: 23.2; Place: 2nd

Week No.	Dance/Song	Judges' score			Total	Result
Week No.	Dance/Song	Redmond	Barry	Benson	Total	Result
1	Jive / "Tiger Feet"	5	6	7	18	No elimination
2	No dance performed	-	-	-	-	No elimination
3	Foxtrot / "Half the World Away"	7	8	8	23	Safe
4	Tango / "Into The Unknown"	8	9	9	26	Safe
5	Charleston / "Bingo Bango"	7	6	8	21	Safe
6	Charleston / "Woman Up"	8	8	9	25	No elimination Switch-Up Week With Lottie Ryan
7	Contemporary Ballroom / "Someone You Loved"	7	8	8	23	Safe
8	Paso Doble / "Pompeii"	7	7	7	21	Safe
9	Rumba / "One"; Team Dance / "Sing, Sing, Sing (With a Swing)"	7; 9	8; 9	8; 9	23; 27	Safe
10	American Smooth / "The Most Effectual Top Cat"; Rock-Til-You-Drop / "Happy Days"	8 Awarded	8; 3	9 points	25; 28	Safe
11	Viennese Waltz / "Another Life"; Salsa (with Laura Nolan) / "I Know You Want Me (Calle Ocho)"	8; 9	9; 9	9; 9	26; 27	Runners-up

=== Series 5 ===
Celebrity partner
Aengus Mac Grianna; Average: 13.7; Place: 10th

Week No.	Dance/Song	Judges' score			Total	Result
Week No.	Dance/Song	Redmond	Barry	Gourounlian	Total	Result
1	No dance performed	-	-	-	-	No elimination
2	Charleston / "Goody Two Shoes"	4	6	6	16	No elimination
3	Waltz / "If You Don't Know Me by Now"	3	4	4	11	Safe
4	Samba / "Help Yourself"	3	4	4	11	Safe
5	Jive / "All Shook Up"	5	6	6	17	Eliminated

=== Series 6 ===
Celebrity partner
Carl Mullan; Average: 24; Place: 1st

Week No.	Dance/Song	Judges' score			Total	Result
Week No.	Dance/Song	Redmond	Barry	Gourounlian	Total	Result
1	Foxtrot / "Daydream Believer"	5	5	6	16	No elimination
2	Paso Doble / "Beautiful Day"	7	8	8	23	No elimination
3	Samba / "Shake Your Bon-Bon"	6	7	7	20	Safe
4	American Smooth / "If I Didn't Have You"	6	7	7	20	Safe
5	Viennese Waltz / "Pointless"	7	7	8	22	Safe
6	Jive / "Higher Power"	7	8	8	23	No elimination
7	Tango / "Sucker"	8	8	8	24	Safe
8	Salsa / "Gangnam Style"	7	8	8	23	Safe
9	Charleston / "Bills"; Team Freestyle / "Crying at the Discoteque"	9; 8	9; 10	10; 10	28; 28	Safe
10	Quickstep / "Hit the Road Jack"; Marathon / "I Want Candy"	8 Awarded	9; 3	9 Points	26; 29	Safe
11	Paso Doble / "Beautiful Day"; Showdance / "Celestial"	9; 10	10; 10	10; 10	29; 30	Winners

== Personal life ==
From 2016 Barker was in a relationship with fellow Dancing with the Stars professional dancer, Curtis Pritchard. In early 2019 it was reported the couple were no longer an item. In late 2019, Barker and her Series 3 celebrity dance partner, Johnny Ward, confirmed they were an item. They ended their relationship in March 2020.
