= Bláthnaid Treacy =

Irish broadcaster and child actress

Bláthnaid Treacy Moon (born 1987/1988) is an Irish radio and television broadcaster, podcaster, and former child actress from County Wicklow. She played Denise Byrne on Glenroe from infancy, until the show's finale in 2001.

She presented radio shows on RTÉ 2fm, including The National Chart Show, and presented Lotto draws on RTÉ One and Dancing with the Stars' companion show Can't Stop Dancing on RTÉ Two, and the Choice Music Prize ceremony for 2fm.

She has been a judge in Eurosong 2025, Ireland's run-off for its entry into the 2025 Eurovision Song Contest, and a member of Ireland's jury for Eurovision 2015. She took part in a celebrity edition of Ireland's Fittest Family in 2022, finishing in third place. Her podcast The Triple Effect covers people and situations that have affected interviewees.

== Personal life ==
Treacy has been diagnosed with ADHD. She is married to jazz musician Charlie Moon. They have 2 children.
