= Emmanuel Paddy Iyamu =

Nigerian politician and philanthropist

Emmanuel Idiagbon Paddy Iyamu
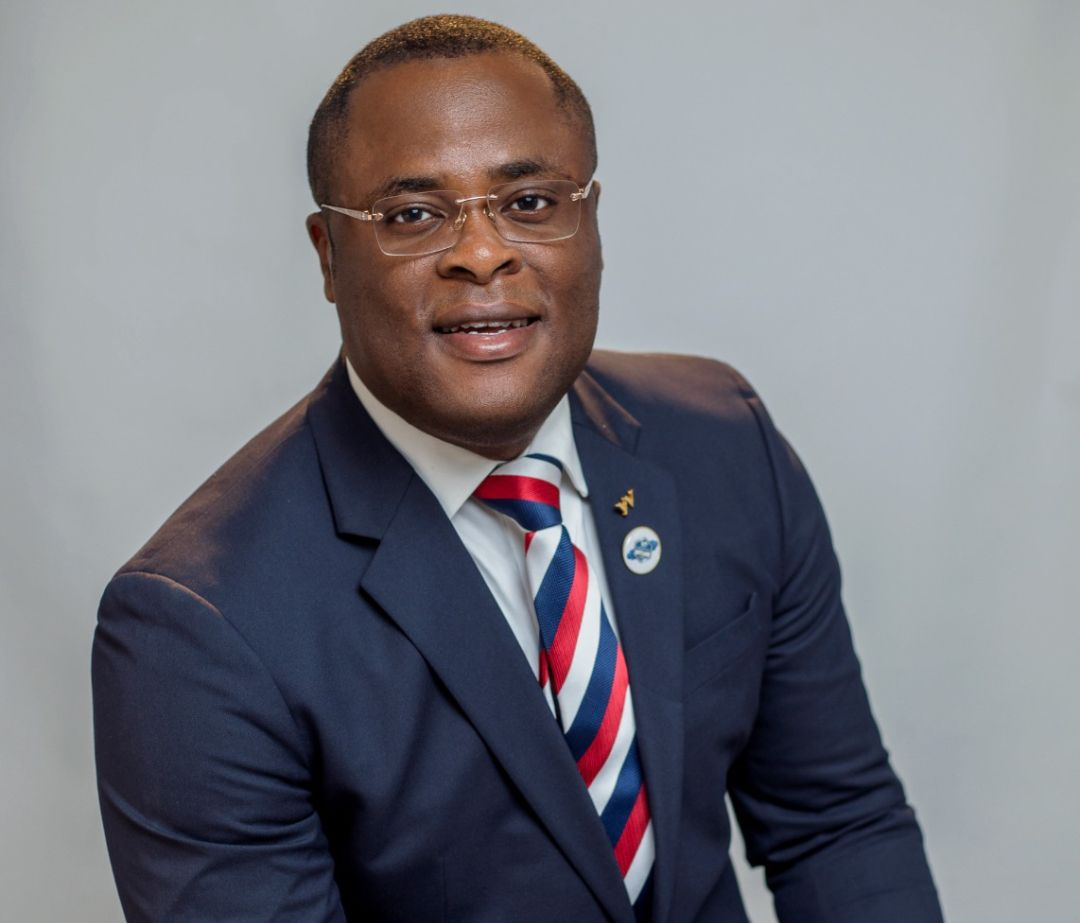

Edo State Commissioner for Education
- Incumbent
- Assumed office 21 January 2025
- Preceded by: Joan Osa Oviawe

Edo State Universal Basic Education Board, (SUBEB) Chairman
- In office 25 November 2024 – 21 January 2025
- Preceded by: Ozavize E. Salami
- Succeeded by: Onomen Goodness Briggs

Personal details
- Education: Oxford University Business School; University of Benin; Rivers State University
- Profession: Politician, philanthropist

Emmanuel Idiagbon Paddy Iyamu, is a Nigerian politician and philanthropist. He is the current Commissioner for Education in Edo State. He was appointed by the Executive Governor of the State Monday Okpebholo to replace Joan Osa Oviawe in January 2025.

== Early life and education ==
Iyamu is a graduate of Business Administration from University of Benin and MBA from the same university. He holds a Professional Diploma in Safety and Security Management from Rivers State University. He is also an alumnus of Oxford University Business School. He was awarded a Professional Doctorate in Leadership and Management from City University of Paris and a Doctorate degree in Petroleum Resources from the European American University.

== Career ==
Iyamu began his career at Zenith Bank in Nigeria before moving to the oil and gas sector. In 2010, he secured a position with Shell Petroleum Development Company and, two years later, joined NPDC/Neconde JV, where he participated in oil exploration and production on the OML 42 asset in the Niger Delta. He advanced to a managerial role, which he held until his resignation in 2023 to enter the private business sector.

In his private enterprise, he provided marine support services to companies including Shell Petroleum, Chevron Nigeria, Lee Engineering, Agip Petroleum, and NNPC E & P. He is involved in several professional organizations: he is a member of ASIS International (ASIS), a Fellow of the Nigerian Institute for Industrial Security (NIIS), and is affiliated with Rotary International. He also maintains connections with Financial Supermarket Ltd and the Center for Community Health, and participates in Lion's Club International.

== Commissioner for Education ==
Iyamu is the current Commissioner for Education in Edo State. He was appointed by the Executive Governor of the State Monday Okpebholo to replace Joan Osa Oviawe in January 2025. Before his appointment, he served as the Edo State Universal Basic Education Board, (SUBEB) Chairman.

== Philanthropy ==
Iyamu's Foundation has empowered thousands of persons through programmes like The Prison Outreach, Christmas with Widows, Yearly 100 Free Surgeries, and Evening with Dr. Paddy. He has given grants to young entrepreneurs, moved families to better houses, donated financially to many local NGOs, widows, and under privileged Nigerians. The University of Benin Postgraduate Association secretariat was named after him.

== Selected Awards ==
Sources:

- Pan African Leadership Award (2018)
- World Business Leaders’ Summit & Honours (2019)
- Young CEO Award by Chamber of Commerce, Abuja (2022)
- Emerging Entrepreneur of the Year by Leaders Without Border Award (2022)
- Africa Achievers Awards (2023)

== Personal life ==
Iyamu is married with two children.
