= Gaelic Masters Association =

Irish amateur sporting organisation

- Predecessor: Masters competitions organised by the Gaelic Athletic Association
- Formation: 2011; 15 years ago
- Founder: John Pat Sheridan
- Location: Ireland
- Chairman: John Pat Sheridan
- Website: gaelicmastersassociation.ie

The Gaelic Masters Association (GMA) is an Irish amateur sporting organisation, focused on promoting indigenous Gaelic games among people over 40 years of age. They are independent of the Gaelic Athletic Association (GAA) and were founded by Mayo man John Pat Sheridan in 2011 in response to the GAA disbanding their own Masters competitions in 2009 citing rising insurance costs, having organised competitions since 1990. Prior to founding the breakaway association he had brought motions to the GAA Congress in 2010 and 2011 to revive the competitions under the auspices of the GAA but the motion failed both times. As they were no longer a part of the GAA they were not allowed to train and play matches at GAA grounds and had to use public pitches, expect in a few counties where county boards allowed them to use official GAA grounds. In 2018 the GMA and the GAA came to an agreement to permit the GMA to use GAA grounds after the GMA put in place the insurance cover required to allow them to use GAA facilities if clubs and counties wished to make them available for Masters games.

16 counties competed for the 2018 Masters Football Championship; Antrim, Cavan, Clare, Donegal, Down, Dublin, Galway, Kildare, Leitrim/Longford, London, Mayo, Monaghan, Roscommon, Sligo, Tyrone, and Westmeath.

The 2022 football champions, Tyrone, retained their title by defeating Dublin in a game in which Denis Bastick was sent off after being issued with a straight red card shortly after taking to the field.

== International representation ==
In 2016 they were represented by a national team in an International rules football match against an Australian rules football team representing Australia.
