= Leah O'Rourke =

Actress from Northern Ireland

- Born: 12 November 1988 (age 37); Newry, County Down, Northern Ireland
- Occupation: Actress
- Years active: 2006–present
- Television: Derry Girls
- Relatives: John Lynch (uncle), Susan Lynch (aunt)

Leah O'Rourke (born 12 November 1988) is an actress from Northern Ireland. She is best known for her role as Jenny Joyce in the Channel 4 comedy series Derry Girls.

== Career ==
O'Rourke rose to prominence in 2018 following her supporting role in the comedy series, Derry Girls.

O'Rourke won a best supporting actress award for her role in feature film The Spin 2025

Outside of Derry Girls, O'Rourke has appeared in several short films, including Anna (2013), and Normality (2014). In 2016 O'Rourke played the character of Siobhán in the award-winning film Half Brothers. O'Rourke has spoken about how she auditioned for the critically acclaimed drama series, Normal People

Aside from acting professionally, O'Rourke has also worked as a drama tutor in the Fermanagh School of Music and Performing Arts.

In 2023, O'Rourke took part as a contestant on the sixth series of Dancing with the Stars, paired with John Nolan.

Leah is also the niece of actor John Lynch and actress Susan Lynch.

== Filmography ==
Year	Film/Television	Role	Notes
2006	Fiddler's Walk	Young Naomh	Film
2008	Last Man Hanging	Dancer	TV film
2009	Seacht	Student	TV series
2012	Game of Thrones	Extra	TV series
2013	Wasted	Girl at party	Short film
2013	Anna	Anna Phelan	Short film
2013	Midnight	Sarah	Short film
2014	1: Nenokkadine	Passerby	Film
2014	Normality	Julie	Short film
2016	Half Brothers	Siobhán	Film
2018–2022	Derry Girls	Jenny Joyce	TV series
2022	The Six O'Clock Show	Guest	Chat show
2023	Dancing with the Stars	Contestant	Series 6
2025	The Spin	Tracey	Film
