= Trent Whiddon =

Australian dancer and choreographer

- Born: Trent Whiddon; Sydney, Australia
- Occupations: Dancer, choreographer
- Spouse: Gordana Grandosek
- Website: Trent Whiddon on X

Trent Whiddon is an Australian dancer and choreographer, best known for his professional appearances on the BBC One dance series Strictly Come Dancing.

== Early life ==
Whiddon started dancing at the age of seven. His mother encouraged him and he trained in a wide range of styles including Ballroom, Latin-American, Jazz, Tap, Ballet and Hip Hop. At the age of 15 he represented Australia at the Junior British Championships, reaching the open final. In 2005 he competed as a Latin dancer with partner Peta Murgatroyd.

Two years later he joined the cast of Burn the Floor. In his second tour with the show he became lead dancer and later served as Dance Captain and Company Manager.

Whiddon has also appeared as a professional dancer on Australia's Dancing with the Stars and has choreographed for two seasons of So You Think You Can Dance Australia, alongside his Slovenian wife Gordana Grandosek, whom he met in 2008 when they became dance partners and Australian Professional Ten Dance Champions.

== Television appearances ==
=== Strictly Come Dancing ===
On 6 August 2014 it was announced that Robin Windsor would not be competing as a professional in series 12 of the show, due to back injury, and he was replaced by Whiddon. He was partnered with singer Pixie Lott. The couple left the show in week 11, competing in the dance-off against Simon Webbe and Kristina Rihanoff, and eliminated on the casting vote of head judge Len Goodman. On 23 April 2015 it was announced that Whiddon would not be returning for Series 13 of Strictly.

Week #	Dance/Song	Judges' scores				Total	Result
Week #	Dance/Song	Horwood	Bussell	Goodman	Tonioli	Total	Result
1	Jive / "Shake It Off"	7	7	7	7	28	No elimination
2	Waltz / "Come Away With Me"	8	8	8	8	32	Safe
3	Quickstep / "Be Our Guest"	7	9	9	9	34	Safe
4	Rumba / "Stay with Me"	8	8	8	9	33	Safe
5	Samba / "I, Yi, Yi, Yi, Yi (I Like You Very Much)"	8	9	9	9	35	Safe
6	Tango / "Danger! High Voltage"	8	8	8	9	33	Safe
7	Foxtrot / "When I'm Sixty-Four"	9	10	9	9	37	Safe
8	Pasodoble / "The Eve of the War"	9	9	10	10	38	Safe
9	Charleston / "Sparkling Diamonds"	9	9	9	10	37	Safe
10	Viennese Waltz / "Tulips from Amsterdam"	9	9	10	10	38	Safe
11	Cha-Cha-Cha / "Love Shack"; Waltz-a-Thon / "The Last Waltz"	9 Awarded	9; 6	8 Extra	9 Points	35; 41	Eliminated

=== Dancing with the Stars: Ireland ===
On 4 January 2019 Whiddon was announced as a replacement partner for model Holly Carpenter, after her original partner Curtis Pritchard was injured in a nightclub attack on 26 December 2018. They were the second couple to be eliminated.

Week #	Dance/Song	Judges Scores			Total	Result
Week #	Dance/Song	Redmond	Barry	Benson	Total	Result
1	No dance performed	-	-	-	-	No elimination
2	Salsa / "Neon Lights"	5	5	6	16	No elimination
3	Waltz / "Lollipops and Roses"	5	5	5	15	Safe
4	Foxtrot / "Beauty and the Beast"	5	5	6	16	Eliminated
