= Clelia Murphy =

Irish actress (born 1975)

- Born: 5 December 1975 (age 50); Dublin, Ireland
- Education: Gaiety School of Acting
- Occupation: Actress
- Television: Fair City; Doctors
- Children: 1

Clelia Murphy (born 5 December 1975) is an Irish actress. From 1996 to 2017, Murphy starred in the RTÉ soap opera Fair City as Niamh Cassidy. After leaving her role as Niamh, she competed in the third series of the Irish edition of Dancing with the Stars, where she reached the quarter-finals. In January 2022, Murphy was cast in the BBC soap opera Doctors as Maeve Ludlow, for which she moved from Dublin to Birmingham.

== Early and personal life ==
Murphy trained at the Gaiety School of Acting in Dublin, Ireland. She also has an MA in screenwriting. In 1998, Murphy gave birth to a daughter, Clarabelle. Clarabelle is an actress.

== Career ==
Murphy began her career in Fair City in 1996 playing schoolgirl Niamh Cassidy. Her character was featured in numerous storylines, involving having an illegal relationship with teacher Barry O'Hanlon (Pat Nolan), her tumultuous relationship with her husband, Paul Brennan (Tony Tormey), having an affair and eventually leaving her husband with his money. In 2017, after 22 years on the soap, Murphy announced her decision to leave Fair City. She revealed that she had been thinking about the decision since 2015 and eventually finalised her plans when she felt she was no longer learning anything from the experience. She added: "I felt like I was doing the same thing over and over again. It wasn’t fulfilling me anymore."

In January 2019, Murphy appeared on the third series of the Irish edition of Dancing with the Stars. Murphy was paired with Estonian dancer Vitali Kozmin in the competition. They reached the quarter-finals of the competition before being eliminated after falling into the dance-off for the third consecutive week.

In 2021, she appeared in an episode of the Channel 5 series The Madame Blanc Mysteries, which she described as an "amazing experience". In February 2022, it was reported that Murphy had been cast in the BBC soap opera Doctors. She played Maeve Ludlow, a new nurse in the Sutton Vale practice. She had begun filming on Doctors in January of that year after receiving a direct offer from the casting team. She moved to Birmingham, England to appear in the soap.

== Filmography ==
=== Film ===
Year	Film	Role
2000	Odd Sock	Sandra
2001	The Crooked Mile	Jane
2010	Gift of the Magi	Simone
2012	Grabbers	Irene Murphy
2015	Dare to be Wild	Barbara Murphy
2015	JFK. The Badge Man Conspiracy	Rose
2016	The Gaelic Curse	Flo
2019	DannyBoy	Kathleen Buckley

=== Television ===
Year	Title	Role	Notes
1996–2017	Fair City	Niamh Cassidy	Series regular
2017	Nowhere Fast	Cyclist Lorraine	Episode: "Work"
2019	Dancing with the Stars	Herself	Contestant
2021	The Madame Blanc Mysteries	Georgina	1 episode
2022	Doctors	Maeve Ludlow	Recurring role

== Stage ==
Year	Title	Role	Ref.
2014	Spring Awakening	Frau Gabor	
2016	Elvis is My Daddy	Lulubelle LaVelle	
2019	The Sound of Music	Baroness Elsa	
