= Joan Osa Oviawe =

Nigerian educationalist

Commissioner of Education (Edo State)
- In office 5 October 2021 – 8 November 2024
- Preceded by: Hon. Barrister Emmanuel Ijegbai
- Succeeded by: Emmanuel Paddy Iyamu

Personal details
- Born: Joan Osa Oviawe; 18 May
- Occupation: Educationist

Joan Osa Oviawe is a Nigerian educationist who was the Edo State Commissioner of Education. She was appointed by the Executive Governor of the State Godwin Obaseki to replace Barrister Emmanuel Ijegbai in October 2021.

== Former Commissioner for Education Edo State ==
On 5 October 2021, the Executive Governor of Edo State Godwin Obaseki appointed Oviawe to replace Barrister Emmanuel Ijegbai as a commissioner on his second term in office. On 8 November 2024, Governor Godwin Obaseki dissolved the State Executive Council ahead of his handover to a new administration led by Senator Monday Okpebholo. Until her appointment as the Commissioner of Education, she was the chairman of Edo State Universal Basic Education Board (Edo SUBEB) from 2018. During Oviawe's time in SUBEB which she spearheaded, she ensured the training of 11,356 Teachers and Headmasters in order for the Educational Sector in Edo State to come to its best. Oviawe is the Executive Chairperson of the Edo State Universal Basic Education Board (SUBEB). Oviawe is a gender and education specialist. She is the founder of the Africa Special Interest Group (ASIG) of the Comparative and International Education Society. Oviawe was recently appointed to the Working Group on global e-learning of the World Congress of Comparative Education Societies. Joan Oviawe introduced the EdoBEST (Edo Basic Education Sector Transformation) Programme and the outcome of the programme has been applauded both locally and internationally. Her implementation of the EdoBest Program has led to a notable improvement in the reading and numeracy capabilities of pupils in Edo State, the EdoBest 2.0 was launched by the Governor of the state during the third anniversary of EdoBest on the 28th of June, 2021. The EdoBest 2.0 simply means that Edo is the best in all tiers of Education which is no longer an acronym but what is being worked upon with daily achievements.
