= Fred Cooke (comedian) =

Irish comedian (b. 1980)

- Born: 27 August 1980 (age 44); Kells, County Meath, Ireland
- Occupation(s): Comedian, actor
- Years active: 2009–present
- Television: The Tommy Tiernan Show; The Savage Eye

Frederick Cooke (born 27 August 1980) is a stand-up comedian, actor and musician from Kells, County Meath, Ireland. He is married to comedian, Julie Jay and lives in Kerry.

== Career ==
In 2011, Cooke began touring regularly with his stand-up playing the Irish comedy circuit including the Cat Laughs Comedy Festival. That same year he made his debut at Edinburgh Fringe Festival with his show, 'Comfort in Chaos' for which Chortle named him "Ireland's Most Unique Stand-Up."

Between 2009 and 2016, Cooke appeared in various sketches on the RTÉ comedy show, Republic of Telly.

In 2012, Cooke played various roles in David McSavage's comedy sketch show The Savage Eye. He also had a guest role in the BBC comedy series, Vexed.

In 2013, he played with the indie rock band, Ham Sandwich, supporting Bon Jovi at Slane Castle.

Throughout 2014 and 2015, Cooke was one of the lead pranksters on RTÉ's hidden camera show, The Fear.

In 2015, Cooke wrote and starred in his own comedic documentary, Operation Transportation: Highway to Kells for RTÉ2 which followed him learning to drive at the age of 35.

As of 2017, Cooke has been the announcer on The Tommy Tiernan Show. That same year he had a guest role in the RTÉ comedy series, Bridget & Eamon.

He appeared on the 2019 series of the Irish edition of Dancing with the Stars.

== Filmography ==
=== Television ===
Year	Title	Role	Note(s)
2009–2016	Republic of Telly	Various characters	Main cast
2012	The Savage Eye	Various characters	
2012	Vexed	Stefan Maier	
2017	Bridget & Eamon	Seanie	1 episode
2017–present	The Tommy Tiernan Show	Announcer	
2019	Dancing with the Stars (Ireland)	Himself	
2021	Name That Tune	Himself	Extra crowdwarmer; uncredited cameo
