= Johnny Ward (actor) =

Irish actor (born 1987)

- Born: 21 May 1987 (age 39); Dublin, Ireland
- Occupation: Actor
- Years active: 1996–present
- Television: Love/Hate; Fair City; Dancing with the Stars

Johnny Ward (born 21 May 1987) is an Irish actor from Walkinstown, Dublin. He is best known for his role as Pauley in the fifth series of the RTÉ drama series Love/Hate, for playing the part of controversial kidnapper, Ciaran Holloway in Fair City, and starring alongside Sean Penn in the 2011 comedy-drama This Must Be the Place.

== Career ==
In 2014, Johnny starred in his breakthrough role of Pauley in the Irish drama, Love/Hate.

He has played six different roles in Fair City.

In December 2018, Ward was named as one of the eleven celebrities taking part in the third series of Dancing with the Stars. Ward was partnered with British dancer, Emily Barker. They reached the final of the competition, eventually finishing as runners-up to Mairéad Ronan and John Nolan.

== Personal life ==
Ward was born and raised in Walkinstown, a suburb in South Dublin. He attended Templeogue College. His sister Maureen is a talent agent; together they run a performing arts school.

While taking part in Dancing with the Stars, Ward's father, John, died after a long battle with cancer the day before Ward was due to perform in the ninth live show. Ward was given the option to have a week off from the competition and return in Week 10 but he chose to perform in honour of his father.

Ward married Brenda Murphy on 8 July 2023 in Kilcullen, County Kildare.

== Filmography ==
=== Film ===
Year	Film	Character(s)
1996	The Boy from Mercury	Classroom schoolboy
2011	This Must Be the Place	Steven
2012	Dollhouse	Eanna
2016	Mammal	Sully

=== Television ===
Year	Title	Role
2005	Fair City	Kurt Whelan
2007	Prosperity	Marcus
2008	Raw	Mugger
2011	Primeval	Ted
2014	The Centre	Vinnie Corcoran
2014	Love/Hate	Pauley
2015	The Clan of the Cave Bear	Broud
2016–2017, 2019, 2024–	Fair City	Ciaran Holloway
2019	Dancing with the Stars (Ireland)	Himself

=== Stage ===
Year	Title	Role
2012	Cinderella	Buttons
2018	Coppers: The Musical	Gino
2025	Little Shop of Horrors	TBC
