= Holly Carpenter =

Irish model and beauty pageant titleholder (born 1991)

- Born: 9 October 1991 (age 34); Dublin, Ireland
- Education: National College of Art and Design
- Height: 177 cm (5 ft 10 in)
- Beauty pageant titleholder
- Title: Miss Ireland 2011
- Hair color: Brown
- Eye color: Green

Holly Carpenter (born 9 October 1991) is an Irish model and beauty pageant titleholder who was crowned Miss Ireland 2011 on 13 August 2011. She represented Ireland in the Miss World pageant held on 6 November 2011 in London, England.

== Media career ==
Her modelling career began in 2011 when she was entered into the Miss Ireland national beauty pageant by a friend which she won but was subsequently unplaced in the Miss World 2011.

She ranked only 42nd in the competition which she attributes to not having a polished promotional video. Having won Miss Ireland, her modelling career took off and she found work in Ireland and the UK.

=== Britain and Ireland's Next Top Model ===
In 2013, Carpenter was named among 28 semi-finalists for the 9th cycle of Britain & Ireland's Next Top Model. She was chosen as one of the 14 finalists competing for the title. After several appearances in the bottom three/four, she was eliminated in episode 9 and became the 8th eliminated.

=== Celebrity MasterChef Ireland ===
In January 2017, Carpenter appeared on Celebrity MasterChef Ireland. She was eliminated in the first week of the competition.

=== Dancing with the Stars ===
Carpenter appeared on the 2019 series of the Irish edition of Dancing with the Stars. She was eliminated from the competition in week four.

== Personal life ==
Carpenter was born and raised in Raheny, Dublin, Ireland. She is the granddaughter of the social diarist Terry Keane She speaks English, Irish, and French.

In 2011, Carpenter was working towards an arts degree in textiles at the National College of Art and Design.

From 2012 to July 2014, Carpenter was in relationship with Leinster and Ireland Rugby International Cian Healy for two years before they split up.

Between 2015 and 2016, Carpenter dated Danny O’Reilly of Irish rock band The Coronas.

In 2017, Carpenter dated football pundit Richard Sadlier for five months. They split after Carpenter claimed Sadlier, who is twelve years her senior, was too old for her.

On 27 May 2025 (16 months ago), Carpenter married her long-term partner, Jamie Hunt.
