= Demi Isaac =

Nigerian-born Irish actress (born 2000)

Demi Isaac Oviawe
- Born: 2 November 2000 (age 25); Benin City, Nigeria
- Occupations: Actress, Radio presenter
- Years active: 2018–present
- Known for: The Young Offenders; Cork's 96FM; RTÉ 2fm
- Height: 5 ft 10 in (1.78 m)

Demi Isaac Oviawe (/əˈvjɑːweɪ/ ə-VYAH-way; born 2 November 2000), sometimes known as Demi Isaac, is a Nigerian-born Irish actress who grew up in Ireland. She is best known for her role as Linda Walsh in the RTÉ and BBC comedy The Young Offenders (2018–2020).

In 2017, the Irish Examiner named Oviawe as one of their annual "Ones to Watch for 2018".

She appeared on the 2019 series of the Irish edition of Dancing with the Stars. She was eliminated on 17 February, making her the fourth celebrity to be voted off.

She will present a weekend show on 2FM from early 2025.

== Early life ==
Oviawe was born in Benin City and moved to Ireland at two where she grew up in the County Cork town of Mallow. Oviawe's parents, Joy and Joe, named her after the actress Demi Moore. They had two sons upon moving to Ireland. Oviawe lost her mother at five and her father at 15, both to cancer. She and her brothers were taken care of by their Irish stepmother Kim Carroll, with whom their father had two more sons, and their paternal uncle Courage.

Oviawe attended Mallow No 1 National School and then Davis College, completing her Leaving Cert in 2019. She first discovered acting at the former when she was cast as Mary in the school's nativity play. At the latter, she played camogie and Gaelic Football, and starred in school productions of Beauty and the Beast, Grease and Sister Act. Initially, Oviawe planned to train as a secondary school teacher. However, in 2017 she auditioned on YouTube for a role in the TV series The Young Offenders, and won the role of Linda Walsh.

== Filmography ==
Key
†	Denotes works that have not yet been released

=== Television ===
Year	Title	Role	Notes
2018–present	The Young Offenders	Linda Walsh	22 episodes
2019	Dancing with the Stars (Ireland)	Herself	Contestant
2022	Holding	Aoife	
2022	The Restaurant	Herself	Contestant

=== Film ===
Year	Title	Role	Notes
2020	To All My Darlings	Adaeze	Short
2022	The School for Good and Evil	Anadil	Direct-to-streaming film
