= Mairead Ronan =

Irish radio presenter

- Born: Mairead Farrell; 3 April 1980 (age 46); Dublin, Ireland
- Education: Ballyfermot College of Further Education
- Occupations: TV and radio presenter
- Known for: Ireland's Fittest Family, Today FM, Dancing with the Stars
- Spouses: Eamon Fitzpatrick (m. 2005; div. 2010) Louis Ronan (m. 2015)
- Children: 3

Mairead Ronan (née Farrell; born 3 April 1980) is an Irish television and radio presenter.

== Early life ==
Ronan was born in Finglas on the Northside of Dublin. She attended a HR Management course after leaving school, but switched to a media course at Ballyfermot College of Further Education.

== Radio career ==
Ronan was featured on The Ray D'Arcy Show that originally aired every weekday morning on Today FM. She initially interned on the show before being promoted to broadcasting assistant, and then became co-producer, also featuring as an on-air contributor.

When Ray D'Arcy left Today FM, Ronan became the producer of The Ian Dempsey Breakfast Show. In 2017, after fifteen years with the radio station Ronan left the radio station to focus on other projects. In 2019, Ronan rejoined the station fronting her own daily music and entertainment show, The Mairead Ronan Show between 12pm-2pm. On 12 November 2021, Ronan announced that she was leaving Today FM again to spend time with her family.

== Television career ==
From November 2006, Ronan became a panelist on series five of the popular RTÉ show The Panel.

Ronan coached Ballymun Kickhams in the 2010 season of Celebrity Bainisteoir. She was also a regular on Republic of Telly on RTÉ 2.

She presented Hello Baby, Bye Bye Body, an RTÉ programme on post-pregnancy body issues, in December 2011.

In October 2012 she was the main presenter of Celebrity Bainisteoir:the Rivals, and in November 2012 she was a presenter on the new The Movie Show on RTÉ Two.

Since 2013, Ronan has hosted the RTÉ competition reality programme, Ireland's Fittest Family. In 2018, she stepped down from hosting the sixth series of the show to have her third child. She resumed hosting duties from 2019.

In 2017, Ronan became the co-host of the RTÉ travel show, Getaways, with Joe Lindsay and Tommy Bowe.

She was the winner the 2019 series of the Irish edition of Dancing with the Stars.

== Business ventures ==
In April 2016, in partnership with Debbie Lawless, Ronan launched FARO, a hairstyling equipment brand.

== Personal life ==
It was announced on 4 July 2010 that Ronan's marriage to advertising executive Eddie Fitzpatrick had ended. She had married him at the age of 24 after meeting him when her mother died on the eve of her 21st birthday. She married businessman Louis Ronan in the village of Ballyclerihan in County Tipperary in June 2015.

Ronan has three children: a son, Dara, from her first marriage to Eddie Fitzpatrick, whom she had when she was 26, and two daughters, Eliza and Bonnie, from her second marriage to Ronan.
