= Kate Sullivan (disambiguation) =

Kate Sullivan (born 1976) is an American news anchor. Kate Sullivan may also refer to:

- Kate Sullivan (model), Irish model
- Kate Sullivan (politician) (born 1950), American politician from Nebraska
- Kate Sullivan, a character in Other People's Money

== See also ==
- Katie Sullivan (disambiguation)
- Catherine Sullivan (disambiguation)
- Kathleen Sullivan (disambiguation)
- Kathy Sullivan (disambiguation)
