= Round Towers GAA (Clondalkin) =

Gaelic games club in County Dublin, Ireland

Round Towers, Clondalkin
- Cumann an Chloigthí, Cluain Dolcáin
- Founded: 1884
- County: Dublin
- Nickname: Towers
- Colours: Green and white
- Grounds: Monastery Road, Moyle Park and Clondalkin Leisure Centre
- Coordinates: 53°19′03″N 6°23′01″W

Playing kits
Standard colours

Round Towers (Irish: Cumann an Chloigthí, Cluain Dolcáin) is a Gaelic Athletic Association (GAA) club, associated with the Dublin County Board, which is based in Clondalkin, County Dublin in Ireland. The club plays the Gaelic games of Gaelic football, hurling in both men's and women's codes.

== History ==
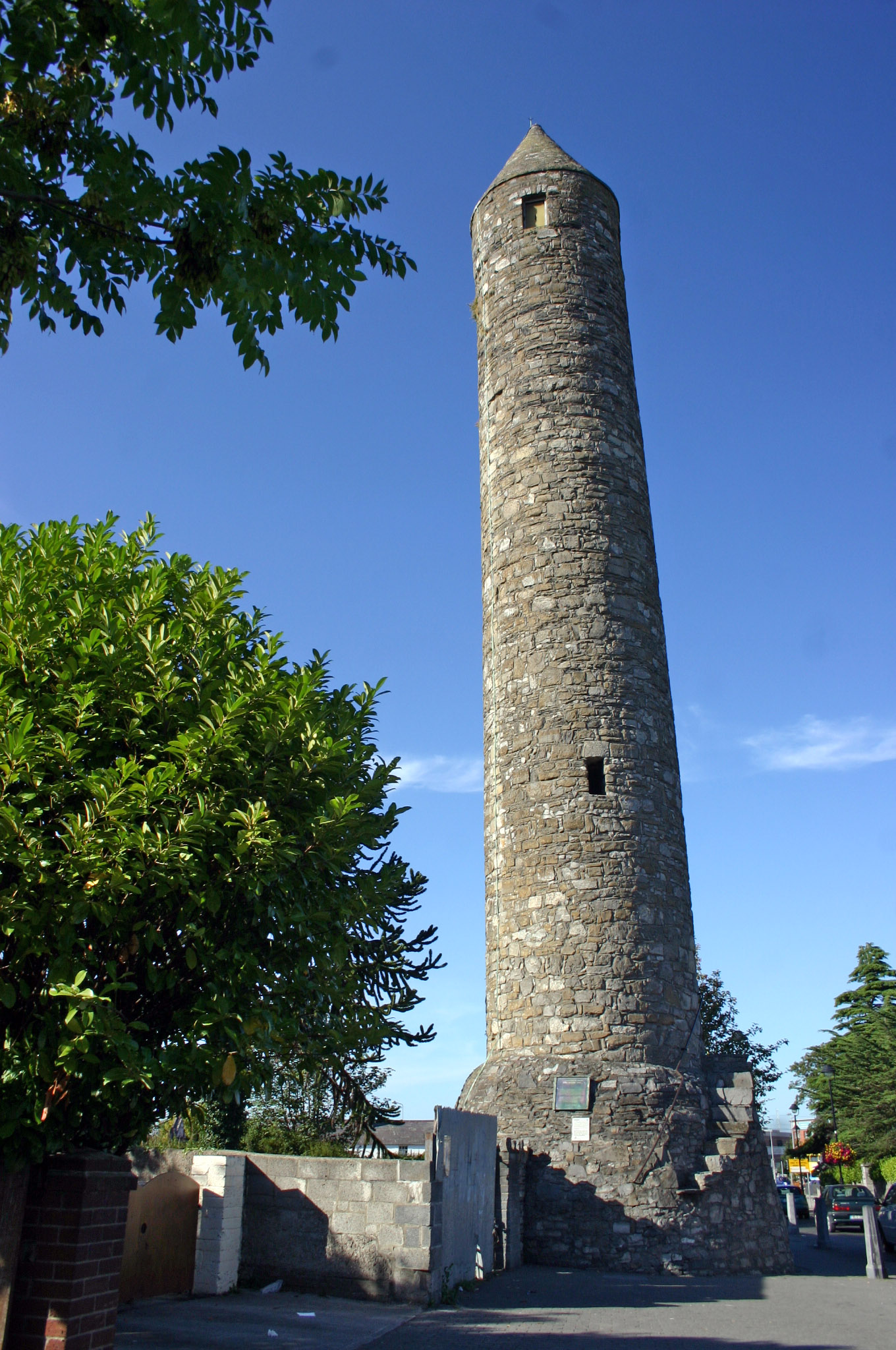
The club is named for Clondalkin Round Tower

In December 1884, the month after the Gaelic Athletic Association (GAA) itself was founded, a meeting was held in Clondalkin to discuss the formation of a Gaelic football club. One of those present, Tom Errity, would later win All-Ireland Senior medals with Dublin in 1892, 1894, 1898, 1899 and 1902.

The club won their first competition, the Baltyboys Tournament, in 1889. The club won their first Dublin Trophy (the Junior League) in 1910. Known simply as "Towers", the club went on to win the Junior League and Junior Championship in 1926. The club had attained Senior status by the 1930s. Three club members in this period, Tom Dowd, Paddy Hickey and Billy Dowling, played for Dublin and Leinster.

The club lost the 1941 Junior Championship but won the 1942 League to regain Senior status. They contested the Intermediate Championship finals in 1948, 1950 and 1951 and defeated O'Dwyers in the Intermediate League final in 1951. Towers won the Dublin Intermediate Football Championship in 1952.

A team representing the club won the Under-21 Dublin Championship in its inaugural year in 1964. This feat was repeated 25 years later, in 1989, when the club won the Under 21 A championship for the second time.

Several club members, including Paddy Delaney, Tony, his son, Fred Kavanagh, Michael Egan and Jim Gavin, are all holders of All-Ireland medals.

== Honours ==
- Dublin Intermediate Football Championship (1): 1952
- Dublin Junior 2 Football Championship (1) 2021:
- Minor Football A Championship (1): 2004
- Dublin U21 Football A Championship (2): 1964, 1989
- Dublin AFL Division 8 (1): 2014
- Dublin Intermediate Hurling Championship (3): 1989, 2006, 2019
- Dublin Junior 'H' Hurling Championship (0): (runners up in 2021)
- Dublin Minor Hurling A Championship (1): 2004
- Dublin Minor Hurling B Championship (1): 2003
- Dublin Adult Ladies League Division 9 (1): 2019
- Dublin Junior 4 Camogie Championship (1): 2020
- Dublin U20 Camogie Division 4 Championship (1): 2021
- Dublin Junior 3B Camogie Championship (1): 2021

== Notable players ==
=== Senior inter-county footballers ===
Dublin

- Jim Gavin
- Darren Homan
- Tom Mulligan
- Derek Murray
- John O'Brien
- Hannah Tyrrell

Laois

- Tom Kelly
- Greg Ramsbottom

Kerry

- Killian Burns

=== Senior inter-county hurlers ===
Leitrim

- Joe Murray

=== Other sports ===
- Hannah Tyrrell - Ireland women's rugby union international
- Neil O'Donoghue - NFL American footballer

== See also ==
- Dublin GAA
- Dublin Senior Club Football Championship
- Dublin Senior Club Hurling Championship
