= Tully's Castle =

Tower house remnants in South Dublin, Ireland

- Caisleán Uí Mhaoltuile (Irish)
- Clondalkin Castle
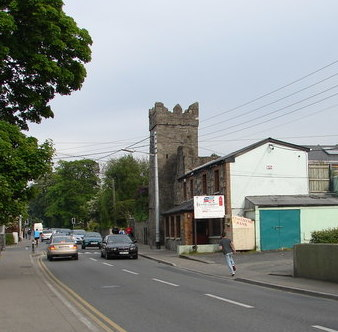
- Monastery Road with Tully's Castle visible

- Location within Dublin
- 53.320812°N 6.389957°W
- Type: Castle
- Location: Monastery Road, Clondalkin, South Dublin, Ireland

History
- Built: 16th century

National monument of Ireland
- Official name: Tully's Castle (Clondalkin)
- Reference no.: 285

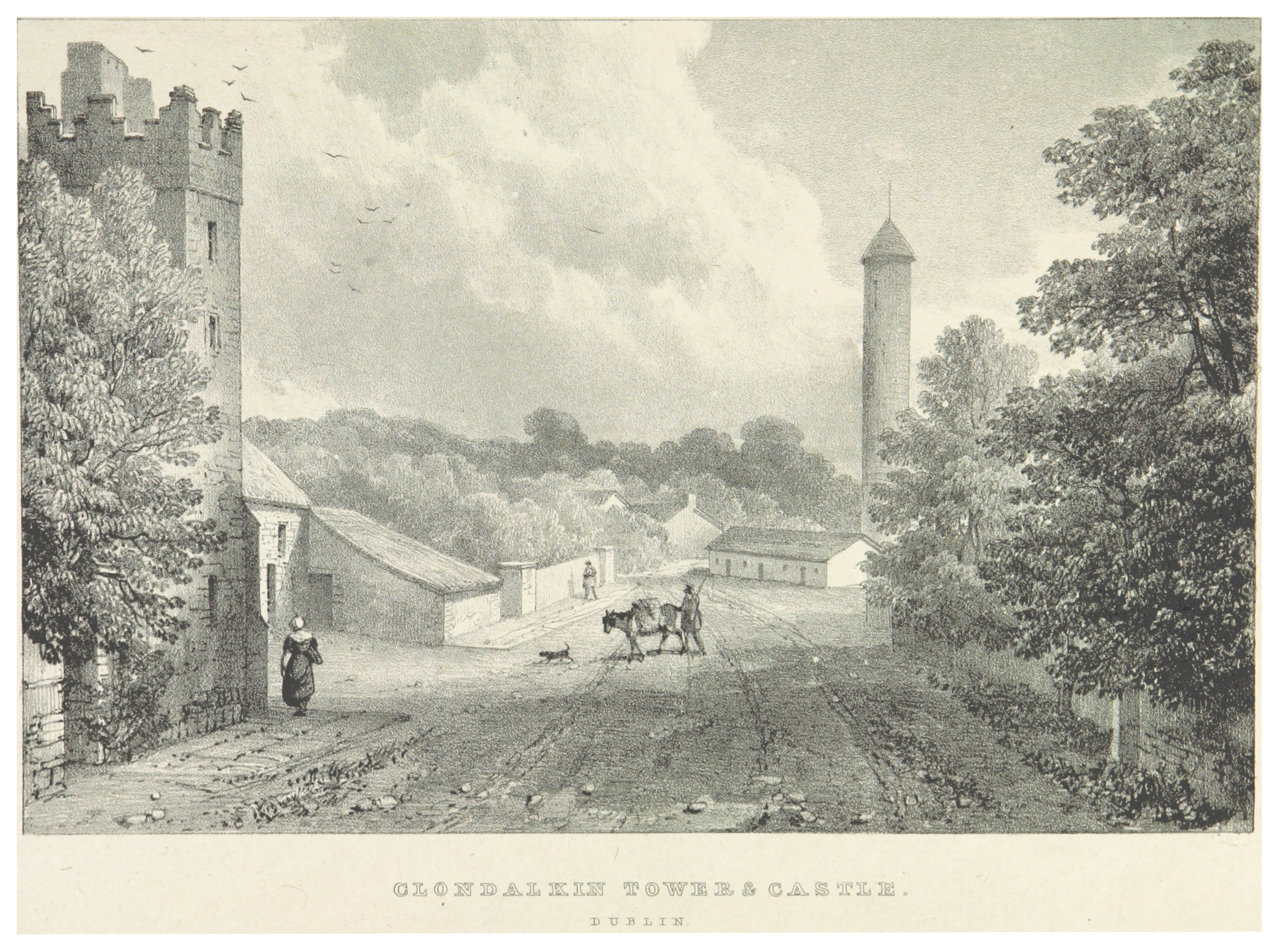
1830 engraving of the castle (left), with Clondalkin Round Tower visible in the distance.

Tully's Castle (Irish: Caisleán Uí Mhaoltuile) is a castle and a National Monument in Clondalkin, Ireland.

== Location ==
Tully's Castle is found on Monastery Road, Clondalkin.

== History ==
Tully's Castle consists of a tall narrow tower (perhaps 16th century) and part of an adjoining building on its northwest side (maybe 17th century). There are two door-like apertures on its southwest side. All of the window openings in the tower are narrow, and most of them are blocked. Although the crenellations are damaged, enough remains to show that they were of the Irish style. There is a row of weeper openings at roof level. The tower looks as if it may have been part of a larger tower house, possibly housing the stairs or the garderobe. The ruins now form part of the garden wall of a modern house. Given the unstable nature of Ireland in the seventeenth century, and particularly raids by the Byrnes on this part of Dublin, such constructions offered their owners security.

The castle was owned by the Tully family during the 18th and 19th centuries.
