= Diana Donnelly =

Irish model

Diana Donnelly (born 1989) is an Irish model and beauty pageant titleholder who was crowned Miss Universe Ireland 2009.

Donnelly followed in the footsteps of her older sister Danielle by working as a model, before taking part in Miss Universe Ireland, as Miss Club 92. She represented her nation at the Miss Universe 2009 pageant on 23 August 2009 on the Bahamas.

Preceded by Lynn Kelly	Miss Universe Ireland; 2009	Succeeded by Rozanna Purcell
