= Lynne Kelly =

Lynne Kelly may refer to:

- Lynn Kelly (born 1957), New Zealand jewellery designer
- Lynne Kelly (science writer) (born 1951), Australian science writer, researcher and science educator
- Lynne Kelly (fiction writer) (born 1969), American fiction writer for children and young adults
