= The Model Scouts =

- Genre: Reality television
- Created by: Billy McGrath
- Developed by: Sideline Productions; RTÉ
- Judges: Fraser Chad Hamilton (Series 1); Erin O'Connor (Series 1); Jeni Rose (Series 2); David Cunningham (Series 2)
- Theme music composer: Airdate
- Opening theme: Everytime
- Country of origin: Ireland
- No. of episodes: 14

Production
- Executive producers: Billy McGrath (Series 1); Katie Giles (Series 1); Una Shinners (Series 2)
- Running time: 60 minutes

Original release
- Network: RTÉ Two
- Release: 20 April 2009 – 21 December 2010

The Model Scouts, formerly The Model Agent during its first season in 2009, is an Irish reality documentary on RTÉ Two that followed twelve girls competing for a lucrative modelling contract with IMG.

In 2008 the series followed model scout Fiona Ellis on her search for an Irish supermodel. On her way through Ireland, Ellis spotted eight girls in the entire country and chose the last four of the twelve finalists through applications that she received. Each episode saw the elimination of one or more girls. The winner, Carrie-Anne Burton, won a contract with the Independent Models agency and a cover of Image magazine. Supermodel Erin O'Connor, who was also discovered by Ellis at the beginning of her career, advised the girls. Ellis said that, in contrast to America's Next Top Model, her aim was to give an insight in finding new model talent with serious ambitions without "all the drama".

For its second season in 2010, the show was renamed The Model Scouts. Jeni Rose and David Cunningham of IMG Models were the judges. The girls were taken to London, Paris, Sydney and New York City. The winner, Tabea Weyrauch, was a 16-year-old girl from Derry. She won a one-year contract with IMG, and became the face of A Wear in Ireland and the United Kingdom. She also appeared on the cover of Life, the magazine section of the Sunday Independent.

== Series summary ==
Cycle	Premiere date	Winner	Runner-up	Other contestants in order of elimination	Number of contestants	International destinations
1	20 April 2009	Carrie-Anne Burton	Amber Jean Rowan	Sadhbh Moore, Miriam El-Mahdi, Chloe Loughnan, Lisa Madden, Julia McGovern, Rochelle McIntyre, Jaime O'Connell, Jennifer Foley, Laura Keohane, Sharon Touhey	12	(United Kingdom); London (United States); New York City
2	2 November 2010	Tabea Weyrauch	Ellen Flanagan	Shannean Gormley & Heather O'Brien, Katie McGinn & Justine Kelly, Lauren Owens & Becky Ali, Sarah Taylor, Jessica Kelly, Lucy Moore, Aishling O'Connell	12	(United Kingdom); London (France); Paris (Australia); Sydney (United States); New York City

== Season one ==
Logo, used in the show's first season in 2009

=== Contestants ===
(ages stated are at start of contest)

Contestant	Age	Hometown	Finish
Sadhbh Moore	18	Kenmare, County Kerry	1st Eliminated Episode 2
Miriam El-Mahdi	18	County Cork	1st Eliminated Episode 2
Chloe Loughnan	16	Blackrock, Cork City	1st Eliminated Episode 2
Lisa Madden	16	County Cork	2nd Eliminated Episode 2
Julia McGovern	17	Belfast	2nd Eliminated Episode 2
Rochelle McIntyre	16	Tuam, County Galway	2nd Eliminated Episode 2
Jaime O'Connell	18	Castletroy, County Limerick	Eliminated Episode 3
Jennifer Foley	18	County Cork	Eliminated Episode 4
Laura Keohane	16	County Cork	Eliminated Episode 5
Sharon Touhey	18	Clara, County Offaly	Eliminated in Episode 6
Amber Jean Rowan	16	Dublin	Runner-up
Carrie-Anne Burton	17	Belfast	Winner

- Lisa Madden eventually became a contestant on the eighth series of Britain & Ireland's Next Top Model.

=== Call-out order ===
Fiona's call-out order
Order	Episodes							
Order	1	2		3	4	5	6	
1	Rochelle	Jaime	Lisa	Carrie-Anne	Amber	Sharon	Sharon	Carrie-Anne
2	Jaime	Julia	Julia	Laura	Laura	Carrie-Anne	Amber	Amber
3	Chloe	Carrie-Anne	Rochelle	Sharon	Sharon	Amber	Carrie-Anne	
4	Laura	Sharon	Amber	Amber	Carrie-Anne	Laura		
5	Sharon	Jennifer	Carrie-Anne	Jennifer	Jennifer			
6	Amber	Sadhbh	Jaime	Jaime				
7	Julia	Laura	Jennifer					
8	Carrie-Anne	Rochelle	Laura					
9		Miriam	Sharon					
10		Amber						
11		Lisa						
12		Chloe						

The contestant was eliminated
The contestant was put through collectively to the next stage
The contestant was immune from elimination
The contestant won the competition

- Sadhbh, Miriam, Lisa, and Jennifer entered the competition in episode 2.

== Season two ==
=== Contestants ===
(ages stated are at start of contest)

Contestant	Age	Hometown	Finish
Shannean Gormley	16	Gorey, County Wexford	Eliminated in Episode 2
Heather O'Brien	19	Mullagh, County Cavan	Eliminated in Episode 2
Katie McGinn	17	Castleblayney, County Monaghan	Eliminated in Episode 3
Justine Kelly	17	Achill, County Mayo	Eliminated in Episode 3
Lauren Owens	16	Rush, North County Dublin	Eliminated in Episode 4
Becky Ali	16	Gorey, County Wexford	Eliminated in Episode 4
Sarah Taylor	20	Dromore, County Down	Eliminated in Episode 5
Jessica Kelly	17	Darndale, Dublin	Eliminated in Episode 6
Lucy Moore	16	Donnybrook, Dublin	Eliminated in Episode 7
Aishling O'Connell	18	Castleisland, County Kerry	Eliminated in Episode 8
Ellen Flanagan	16	Sandymount, Dublin	Runner-up
Tabea Weyrauch	16	Derry	Winner

=== Call-out order ===
David & Jeni's call-out order
Order	Episodes							
Order	2	3	4	5	6	7	8	
1	Tabea	Jessica	Aishling	Ellen	Aishling	Ellen	Ellen	Tabea
2	Katie	Ellen	Sarah	Aishling	Tabea	Tabea	Tabea	Ellen
3	Lauren	Sarah	Ellen	Tabea	Ellen	Aishling	Aishling	
4	Becky	Becky	Lucy	Jessica	Lucy	Lucy		
5	Aishling	Aishling	Tabea	Lucy	Jessica			
6	Sarah	Lauren	Jessica	Sarah				
7	Lucy	Lucy	Becky; Lauren					
8	Jessica	Tabea	Becky; Lauren					
9	Ellen	Justine; Katie						
10	Justine	Justine; Katie						
11	Heather; Shannean							
12	Heather; Shannean							

The contestant was immune from elimination
The contestant was eliminated
The contestant won the competition

- In episode 1, Jenni Rose and David Cunningham scouted the cities of Dublin, Cork, Galway, Derry, and Belfast to find twelve aspiring models. After creating a shortlist of thirty girls, the list was reduced to twenty-one models who were taken to Dublin for the final cut. At the end of the episode, nine of the models, Shauneen, Emma, Holly, Aoife, Niamh, Rebecca, Aoibhin, Eve, and Zahra, were eliminated. The remaining twelve moved on to the main competition.

== See also ==
- Britain's Next Top Model
