= Miss Universe Ireland 2010 =

- Date: June 20, 2010
- Venue: Abbey Theatre, Dublin, Ireland
- Entrants: 12
- Winner: Rozanna Purcell; South Dublin
- Congeniality: Faye Rooney; Fingal
- Photogenic: Rozanna Purcell; South Dublin

Miss Universe Ireland 2010 was held on June 20, 2010 in the Abbey Theatre in Dublin. There was county pageants from March to June 1. The winner represented Ireland at Miss Universe 2010.

== Results ==
Final results	Contestant
Miss Universe Ireland 2010	South Dublin - Rozanna Purcell
1st Runner-up	Kildare - Tiffany Connor-Stanley
2nd Runner-up	Dún Laoghaire–Rathdown - Danielle Byrne
Top 6	Belfast - Liz Caperberry; National Capital - Emily Kelly; Cork - Maedhbh Kelly

=== Special awards ===
- Miss Photogenic - Rozanna Purcell (South Dublin)
- Miss Congeniality - Faye Rooney (Fingal)
- Miss Fashion - Maedhbh Kelly (Cork)
- Miss Internet - Rozanna Purcell (South Dublin)

== Contestants ==
Represents	Contestant	Age	Height	Hometown
Antrim	Jaennete O’Rourke	20	1.77 m (5 ft 9 1/2 in)	Belfast
Belfast	Liz Caperberry	19	1.83 m (6 ft 0 in)	Belfast
Cork	Maedhbh Kelly	23	1.75 m (5 ft 9 in)	Cork
Dublin	Karena Graham	21	1.73 m (5 ft 8 in)	Dublin
Dún Laoghaire–Rathdown	Danielle Byrne	24	1.80 m (5 ft 11 in)	Dublin
Fingal	Faye Rooney	19	1.79 m (5 ft 10 1/2 in)	Dublin
Galway	Sandra Torietilo	26	1.74 m (5 ft 8 1/2 in)	Carnmore
Kildare	Tiffany Connor-Stanley	20	1.77 m (5 ft 9 1/2 in)	Naas
National Capital	Emily Kelly	22	1.76 m (5 ft 9 1/2 in)	Dublin
South Dublin	Rozanna Purcell	18	1.81 m (5 ft 11 1/2 in)	Clonmel
Tipperary	Aisling Bourke	19	1.82 m (5 ft 11 1/2 in)	Dublin
Waterford	Lisa Kavanagh	23	1.71 m (5 ft 7 1/2 in)	Waterford
