= 2017 Dublin Senior Football Championship =

Tournament details
- County: Dublin
- Year: 2017
- Trophy: Clerys Cup
- Date: 20 April - 15 November
- Teams: 32
- Defending champions: St. Vincent's

Winners
- Champions: St. Vincent's (29th win)
- Manager: Brian Mullins
- Captain: Diarmuid Connolly
- Qualify for: Leinster Club SFC

Runners-up
- Runners-up: Ballymun Kickhams
- Manager: Paul Curran

Promotion/Relegation
- Relegated team(s): UCD GAA

Other
- Matches played: 46
- Website: Dublin GAA.ie

The 2017 Dublin Senior Football Championship was the 131st edition of Dublin GAA's premier gaelic football tournament for senior clubs in County Dublin, Ireland. 32 teams participate, with the winner representing Dublin in the Leinster Senior Club Football Championship.

This was Fingallians return to the top flight of Dublin football after a 5-year exodus.

St. Vincent's were the defending Dublin (and Leinster champions) having defeated Castleknock in the 2016 Dublin championship final.

== Format ==
Senior Football Championship

The Senior Football Championship has a straight knock-out format.

Senior Football Championship Tournament

- The losers of the round 1 matches enter the Senior Football Championship Tournament.
- The losers of round 1 matches of the Senior Football Championship Tournament enter a relegation playoff if a non-reserve side wins the Dublin Intermediate Football Championship.

== Team changes ==
The following teams have changed division since the 2016 championship season –

Promoted to 2017 Senior Football Championship from 2016 Intermediate Football Championship

- Fingallians

Relegated from 2016 Senior Football Championship to 2017 Intermediate Football Championship

- O'Tooles

== Senior Football Championship ==
=== Round 1 ===
All 32 teams enter the championship at this stage. The 16 winning teams advance to round 2 while the 16 losing teams exit the Senior 'A' Football Championship and enter the Senior 'B' Football Championship.

20 April 2017; 18:45; Round 1	St. Jude's	1-20 - 0-6	Naomh Mearnóg	Parnell Park; Referee: Barry Tiernan (O'Dwyers)
20 April 2017; 18:45; Round 1	Niall Coakley 0-8 (0-3f), Kevin McManamon 0-4 (0-2f), Declan Donnelly 0-3, Ross O’Brien 1-0 pen, Paul Cunningham, Mark Sweeney, Ronan Joyce, Billy Sheehan and Enda Dalton 0-1 each	Report	Michael Gibbs 0-2, Jamie Walsh 0-2 (0-1f), Oisin Taylor and Niall Murphy (0-1f) 0-1 each	Parnell Park; Referee: Barry Tiernan (O'Dwyers)

20 April 2017; 19:00; Round 1	Kilmacud Crokes	10-12 - 0-7	Erin's Isle	O'Toole Park; Referee: David Sweeney (St. OP/ER)
20 April 2017; 19:00; Round 1	Mark Vaughan 3-4 (0-3f), Paul Mannion 3-2, Callum Pearson 3-0, Pat Burke 1-0, Cian O'Connor 0-3 (0-2f), Conor Casey, Conor Kelly, Shane Cunningham 0-1 each		Niall Crossan 0-5 (0-4f), Luke Sweetman and Keith Dunne 0-1 each	O'Toole Park; Referee: David Sweeney (St. OP/ER)

20 April 2017; 19:00; Round 1	Parnells	1-13 - 0-10	Fingal Ravens	Balgriffin; Referee: Seán McCarthy (St Vincent’s)
20 April 2017; 19:00; Round 1	Stephen Duffy 1-6 (0-1f), Jonathan Bealin 0-3 (0-1f), Darragh Joyce 0-2, S McCluskey and Thomas Davis 0-1 each		Niall Tormey 0-3 (0-2f), Ross McCarthy 0-1, Derek Daly 0-1	Balgriffin; Referee: Seán McCarthy (St Vincent’s)

20 April 2017; 19:00; Round 1	Whitehall Colmcille	1-7 - 1-15	St. Mary's Saggart	12th Lock; Referee: Chris Mooney (St. Pats Palmerstown)
20 April 2017; 19:00; Round 1	John Bridgeman 1-1 (1-0 pen, 0-1f), Tony O’Sullivan 0-2 (0-1f), John Moore, Alan O’Brien (1 '45), Hugh McInerney, Seán Moran 0-1 each	Report	Blaine Kelly 0-5 (0-1f), Cian Walsh 1-2, C Mac Gearailt (0-1f), Alan Marshall, Colin Finn 0-2 each, C Howard and Rhys Butler 0-1 each	12th Lock; Referee: Chris Mooney (St. Pats Palmerstown)

20 April 2017; 20:15; Round 1	St. Oliver Plunkett's/Eoghan Ruadh	2-10 - 0-13	Ballyboden St. Enda's	Parnell Park; Referee: Gary McCormack (Naomh Barróg)
20 April 2017; 20:15; Round 1	Bernard Brogan 0-6 (0-3f), Gareth Smith 1-1 (1-0 pen), Leigh Herron 1-1, Paul Galvin and Tomas Corrigan (0-1f) 0-1 each	Report	Conal Keaney (0-2f) and Sam Molony (0-2f) 0-3 each, Darragh Nelson and Colm Basquel 0-2 each, Donagh McCabe, Stephen O’Connor and Ryan Basquel 0-1 each	Parnell Park; Referee: Gary McCormack (Naomh Barróg)

21 April 2017; 19:00; Round 1	Skerries Harps	2-10 - 1-10	Fingallians	Garristown; Referee: Dave Aston
21 April 2017; 19:00; Round 1	Stephen Smith 0-5 (0-4f), Sean Rocks and Collie Daly 1-0 each, Gerry Daly 0-2, Shane Davis (1 '45), Mark Boylan, Barry Davey 0-1 each		Oisin Lynch 0-3 (0-2f), Ciarán McLoughlin 1-0, Paul Flynn, Cillian Power, David Killeen, Ciaran Murtagh, each	Garristown; Referee: Dave Aston

21 April 2017; 19:00; Round 1	Lucan Sarsfields	4-18 - 0-16	UCD	Monastery Road; Referee: Billy O Connell (Croí Ró Naofa)
21 April 2017; 19:00; Round 1	Brendan Gallagher and Jack Carey 2-0 each, Emmet Ó Conghaile and Tommy Brennan 0-1 each			Monastery Road; Referee: Billy O Connell (Croí Ró Naofa)

21 April 2017; 19:00; Round 1	Na Fianna	2-14 - 0-11	Naomh Ólaf	St. Margarets; Referee: Andrew McAllister (Starlights)
21 April 2017; 19:00; Round 1	Joey Boland 0-4, Paul O'Hanlon and Andrew Baxter 1-0 each, Conor McHugh 0-2, Carl O'Connor each			St. Margarets; Referee: Andrew McAllister (Starlights)

21 April 2017; 19:00; Round 1	Castleknock	0-11 - 0-8	Templeogue Synge Street	O'Toole Park; Referee: Andrew Cummins (Round Towers Clondalkin)
21 April 2017; 19:00; Round 1	Seamus O'Carroll 0-4 (0-3f), Ciaran Kilkenny 0-3, Ben Galvin 0-2, Paul Bourke and Colin Lynch 0-1 each	Report	Niall Scully 0-4 (0-3f), Cillian O'Gara 0-2, Denis Bastick and M Hayes 0-1 each	O'Toole Park; Referee: Andrew Cummins (Round Towers Clondalkin)

21 April 2017; 19:00; Round 1	Raheny	0-17 - 3-12	Cuala	Russell Park; Referee: Darragh Sheppard (Round Towers Lusk)
21 April 2017; 19:00; Round 1	Brian Fenton and Gavin Ivory (0-3f) 0-5 each, Eoin Keogh, Sean McCarthy, Eoghan Smyth 0-2 each, Brian Talty 0-1	Report	Luke Keating 1-6 (0-4f), Niall O'Callaghan 2-1, Mark Schutte 0-2, Conor Mullally, Eoghan Breathnach, Alan Benson 0-1 each	Russell Park; Referee: Darragh Sheppard (Round Towers Lusk)

21 April 2017; 19:00; Round 1	Ballymun Kickhams	5-17 - 2-6	St. Patrick's Palmerstown	Chanel; Referee: Kevin Roche
21 April 2017; 19:00; Round 1	Dean Rock, Eoin O'Neill, Kevin Leahy, Jason Whelan, Colm Hulton 1-0 each			Chanel; Referee: Kevin Roche

22 April 2017; 17:00; Round 1	Ballinteer St. John's	0-13 - 1-15	St. Maur's	Parnell Park; Referee: Dave Feeney (Parnells).
22 April 2017; 17:00; Round 1	Aodhán Clabby 0-4 (0-2f), Simon O'Reilly and Luke Naughton 0-2 each, Nicky Devereux, Sam Tully, Feargal Duffy, Robbie Gaughan, Glenn Whelan 0-1 each	Report	Chris Carthy 0-7 (0-3f), Conor McGuire 1-4, Davy McGuinness, Eoin Fletcher, Vinny Whelan, Alan Byrne 0-1 each	Parnell Park; Referee: Dave Feeney (Parnells).

22 April 2017; 18:30; Round 1	St. Vincent's	3-19 - 3-4	Round Towers Clondalkin	Parnell Park; Referee: Ronnie Malone (St Mary’s Saggart)
22 April 2017; 18:30; Round 1	Albert Martin 2-3, Diarmuid Connolly 0-6 (0-2f, 1 '45), Enda Varley 0-3 (0-2f), Craig Brennan 1-0, Shane B. Carthy 0-3, Gavin Burke, Cormac Diamond, Fiachra Breathnach and Tiernan Diamond 0-1 each	Report	Darragh Kinnavey 2-1, James Kelly 1-0 pen, Thomas Galvin 0-2f, Ian Ward 0-1f	Parnell Park; Referee: Ronnie Malone (St Mary’s Saggart)

22 April 2017; 17:00; Round 1	St. Sylvesters	3-14 - 0-5	St. Annes	O'Toole Park; Referee: John Higgins (Na Fianna)
22 April 2017; 17:00; Round 1	Dylan Connolly 1-4 (0-4f), Jack Hazley and Karl Archibald 1-0 each, Gary Sweeney and Conor Meaney 0-2 each, Andy Cunningham, Ross Hazley, Niall Coughlan, Glen Hazley, Daniel St Ledger, Edmund Walsh (0-1f), 0-1 each	Report	Darragh Fulham 0-3f, Scott Fulham 0-2 (1 '45)	O'Toole Park; Referee: John Higgins (Na Fianna)

22 April 2017; 17:30; Round 1	St. Brigid's	0-14 - 1-7	St. Peregrine's	Blanchardstown IT; Referee: Dermot Deasy
22 April 2017; 17:30; Round 1	Paddy Andrews (0-2f) and Lorcan McCarthy 0-3 each, Cathal Doyle, Darren Freeman, John O'Loughlin 0-2 each, Sean Egan and Daire Plunkett 0-1 each		Christian O'Hara 1-0, Ciaran McGuinness 0-3f, Shane Sweeney 0-2, Tommy Reilly and Eric Lowndes 0-1 each	Blanchardstown IT; Referee: Dermot Deasy

22 April 2017; 18:30; Round 1	Clontarf	1-7 - 0-18	Thomas Davis	O'Toole Park; Referee: David O Connor (Naomh Mearnog)
22 April 2017; 18:30; Round 1	Maitias Mac Donncha 0-5 (0-3f, 1'45), Ross McCullagh 1-0, Nathan Doran and J Carroll 0-1 each	Report	Paul Hudson 0-9 (0-2f), Shane McGrath 0-7, Cian Murphy 0-2	O'Toole Park; Referee: David O Connor (Naomh Mearnog)

=== Round 2 ===
The 16 winners of the first round matches play each other. The 8 winners proceed to the quarter-finals while the 8 losers exit the championship.

11 May 2017; 19:15; Round 2	St Maur's	3-11 - 3-16	Cuala	O'Toole Park; Referee: Billy O Connell (Croí Ró Naofa)
11 May 2017; 19:15; Round 2	Chris Carthy 0-9 (0-6f), Conor McGuire (1-0 pen) and David McGuinness (1-0 pen) 1-1 each, Ciaran Reddin 1-0	Report	Con O'Callaghan 2-4 (0-1f), Luke Keating 1-6 (0-3f), Mark Schutte 0-2, Conor Mullaly, Gavin Hartnett, Darragh Spillane, Niall O'Callaghan 0-1 each	O'Toole Park; Referee: Billy O Connell (Croí Ró Naofa)

11 May 2017; 20:15; Round 2	St. Vincents	2-11 - 0-12	Na Fianna	Parnell Park; Referee: Barry Tiernan (O’Dwyer’s)
11 May 2017; 20:15; Round 2	Diarmuid Connolly 1-4, Shane B. Carthy 0-3, Tomas Quinn 1-0, Cameron Diamond, Daithi Murphy, Gavin Burke, Enda Varley (0-1f) 0-1 each.	Report	Conor McHugh 0-6 (0-2f), Glenn O’Reilly 0-3, Aaron Byrne 0-2, Gus Farrell 0-1.	Parnell Park; Referee: Barry Tiernan (O’Dwyer’s)

12 May 2017; 19:15; Round 2	Lucan Sarsfields	1-12 - 1-16 AET	St.Sylvesters	Finglas; Referee: James King (Garda)
12 May 2017; 19:15; Round 2	Tommy Brennan 0-6 (0-3f), Brendan Gallagher 1-3 (1-0 pen, 0-1f), Philip Greene (1 '45), Emmett O'Conghaile, Darren Gavin 0-1 each	Report	Edmund Walsh 0-4 (0-1f, 1 '45), Dylan Connolly 0-3f, Glen Hazley 1-0, Jack Hazley 0-2, Andy Cunningham, Ross Hazley, Niall Coughlan, Ronan Palmer, Shane Doyle (0-1f), Conor Meaney, Alan Foy 0-1 each	Finglas; Referee: James King (Garda)

12 May 2017; 19:15; Round 2	Kilmacud Crokes	0-15 - 1-9	Parnells	Blakestown; Referee: PJ Murray (St Finian's, Swords)
12 May 2017; 19:15; Round 2	Mark Vaughan 0-6 (0-3f), Callum Pearson 0-3, Conor Kelly 0-2, Pat Duggan, Shane Cunningham, Paul Mannion, Tom Fox 0-1 each	Report	Jonathan Bealin 0-6 (0-5f), Pearse O'Hanlon 1-0, Stephen Duffy 0-2, Thomas Davis 0-1	Blakestown; Referee: PJ Murray (St Finian's, Swords)

12 May 2017; 19:15; Round 2	St. Jude's	2-17 - 0-7	Skerries Harps	Naul; Referee: Sean McCarthy (St Vincent's)
12 May 2017; 19:15; Round 2	Niall Coakley and Declan Donnelly (0-1f) 1-3 each, Kevin McManamon 0-3 (0-2f), Colm Murphy 0-2, Tom Lahiff, Seamus Ryan, Mark Sweeney, Ross O'Brien, Ronan Joyce, Paul Courtney 0-1 each	Report	Harry Dawson 0-3 (0-1f), Shane Davis 0-2 (0-2 '45), Barry Davey and Stephen Smith (0-1f) 0-1 each	Naul; Referee: Sean McCarthy (St Vincent's)

13 May 2017; 17:00; Round 2	Thomas Davis	1-08 - 0-14	St. Brigid's	Parnell Park; Referee: Tony Lambe (St Vincent’s)
13 May 2017; 17:00; Round 2	Ciarán Farrelly 1-2, Paul Hudson (0-1f) and Chris Sallier 0-2 each, Shane McGrath and Daithi Ryan 0-1 each	Report	Lorcan McCarthy (0-1f, 1 '45), Philly Ryan (0-1f), John O’Loughlin 0-3 each, Paddy Andrews 0-2, Seán Egan, Niall Davey, Malachy Tighe 0-1 each	Parnell Park; Referee: Tony Lambe (St Vincent’s)

13 May 2017; 17:30; Round 2	Ballymun Kickhams	8-18 - 0-2	St. Mary's Saggart	O'Toole Park; Referee: Seamus Farrelly (Ballinteer St John’s)
13 May 2017; 17:30; Round 2	Dean Rock 2-7 (1-0 pen, 0-4f), Jason Whelan 1-4, Colm Hulton 2-1, Carl Keely 1-1, Kevin Leahy 1-1, Conor Kavanagh 1-1, James Burke, James McCarthy, Paddy Small 0-1 each	Report	C McGearailt and Blaine Kelly 0-1 each	O'Toole Park; Referee: Seamus Farrelly (Ballinteer St John’s)

13 May 2017; 18:30; Round 2	St. Oliver Plunkett's/Eoghan Ruadh	2-15 - 2-18 AET	Castleknock	Parnell Park; Referee: John Higgins (Na Fianna)
13 May 2017; 18:30; Round 2	Gareth Smith 0-6 (0-4f), Alan Brogan and Niall Walsh 1-2 each, Bernard Brogan 0-3 (0-2f), James Brogan 0-2	Report	Seamus O’Carroll 1-10 (1-0 pen, 0-8f), Ciaran Kilkenny 1-2, Tom Shiels 0-2, Graham Hannigan, Matt Griffin, Colin Lynch, Eoin O'Brien 0-1 each	Parnell Park; Referee: John Higgins (Na Fianna)

=== Quarter-finals ===
29 September 2017; 6:45 pm Quarter-Final	St. Vincents	0-20 - 0-7	St. Sylvesters	Parnell Park; Attendance: 3,468; Referee: Barry Tiernan (O’Dwyer’s); Man of the Match: Tomás Quinn
29 September 2017; 6:45 pm Quarter-Final	Tomas Quinn 0-8 (0-3f), Enda Varley 0-4 (0-2f), Diarmuid Connolly (0-1f) and Cormac Diamond 0-2 each, Ger Brennan, Shane B. Carthy, Gavin Burke, Eamon Fennell 0-1 each	Report	Gary Sweeney and Alex Wright (0-2f) 0-2 each, Paudie White, Alan Foy, Edmund Walsh (0-1f) 0-1 each	Parnell Park; Attendance: 3,468; Referee: Barry Tiernan (O’Dwyer’s); Man of the Match: Tomás Quinn

29 September 2017; 8:15 pm Quarter-Final	Kilmacud Crokes	2-8 - 1-10	Castleknock	Parnell Park; Attendance: 3,468; Referee: Darragh Sheppard (Round Towers Lusk); Man of the Match: Paul Mannion
29 September 2017; 8:15 pm Quarter-Final	Paul Mannion 1-4 (0-4f), Pat Burke 1-1, Shane Cunningham, Callum Pearson, Mark Vaughan 0-1 each	Report	Seamus O'Carroll 0-4, James Sherry 1-0, Des Carlos 0-2 (0-1f), Shane Boland, Kevin Kindlon, Ciaran Kilkenny (0-1f), Colin Lynch (0-1f) 0-1 each	Parnell Park; Attendance: 3,468; Referee: Darragh Sheppard (Round Towers Lusk); Man of the Match: Paul Mannion

30 September 2017; 5:00 pm Quarter-Final	St. Jude's	0-16 - 1-7	Cuala	Parnell Park; Referee: David Sweeney (St. OP/ER)
30 September 2017; 5:00 pm Quarter-Final	Declan Donnelly 0-6 (0-3f), Niall Coakley 0-4 (0-3f), Kevin McManamon 0-3, Mark Sweeney, Ross O'Brien, Kieran Doherty 0-1 each	Report	Con O'Callaghan 0-4 (0-3f), Dara Spillane 1-0, Conor Mullally 0-2, Paul Cunningham 0-1 o.p.	Parnell Park; Referee: David Sweeney (St. OP/ER)

30 September 2017; 6:30 pm Quarter-Final	Ballymun Kickhams	1-17 - 1-9	St. Brigid's	Parnell Park; Referee: Seán McCarthy (St Vincent’s); Man of the Match: Paddy Small
30 September 2017; 6:30 pm Quarter-Final	Paddy Small 1-6, Dean Rock 0-8 (0-4f, 1 '45), James Burke 0-2, Jason Whelan 0-1	Report	Lorcan McCarthy 0-5 (0-4f), Philly Ryan 1-0, Paddy Andrews and Malachy Tighe 0-2 each	Parnell Park; Referee: Seán McCarthy (St Vincent’s); Man of the Match: Paddy Small

=== Semi-finals ===
14 October 2017; 5:00 pm Semi-Final	Ballymun Kickhams	2-15 - 1-10	Kilmacud Crokes	Parnell Park; Referee: Dave Feeney (Parnells)
14 October 2017; 5:00 pm Semi-Final	Jason Whelan and Dean Rock (1-0 pen) 1-2 each, Paddy Small 0-5, Kevin Leahy 0-3, Carl Keeley, James McCarthy, Davey Byrne 0-1 each	Report	Mark Vaughan 1-1, Paul Mannion 0-3 (0-2f), Callum Pearson 0-2, Aidan Jones, Shane Horan, Pat Burke, Cian O'Connor 0-1 each	Parnell Park; Referee: Dave Feeney (Parnells)

14 October 2017; 6:45 pm Semi-Final	St. Vincents	4-12 - 1-12	St. Jude's	Parnell Park; Referee: Gary McCormack (Naomh Barróg)
14 October 2017; 6:45 pm Semi-Final	Tomas Quinn 1-3 (0-3f), Shane B. Carthy 1-1, Brendan Egan and Nathan Mullins 1-0 each, Enda Varley 0-3 (0-1f), Cormac Diamond and Ruairi Trainor 0-2 each, Diarmuid Connolly 0-1	Report	Kevin McManamon (0-3f) and Niall Coakley (0-1f) 0-4 each, Diarmuid McLoughlin 1-1, Kieran Doherty 0-2, Ross O'Brien 0-1	Parnell Park; Referee: Gary McCormack (Naomh Barróg)

== Final ==
30 October 2017; 7:30 pm Final	St. Vincents	1-8 - 0-8	Ballymun Kickhams	Parnell Park; Attendance: 9,000; Referee: David O'Connor (Naomh Mearnog); Man of the Match: Diarmuid Connolly
30 October 2017; 7:30 pm Final	Diarmuid Connolly 1-1, Enda Varey (0-1f) and Tomas Quinn (0-1f) 0-2 each, Craig Wilson, Gavin Burke, Shane B. Carthy 0-1 each	Report	Dean Rock 0-3f, Carl Keeley and Jason Whelan 0-2 each, Paddy Small 0-1	Parnell Park; Attendance: 9,000; Referee: David O'Connor (Naomh Mearnog); Man of the Match: Diarmuid Connolly

== Senior Football Championship Tournament ==
The Dublin Senior 'B' Football Championship has been renamed as the Senior Football Championship Tournament.

=== SFC Tournament Round 1 ===
The 16 losers from the First Round play off in this round. The 8 winners proceed to the SFC Tournament Quarter-Finals while the 8 losers exit the championship. One team is designated home advantage for each tie in a random draw.

13 May 2017; SFC Tournament Round 1	Whitehall Colmcille	0-0 - 1-15	Ballyboden St. Enda's	Cloghran

13 May 2017; SFC Tournament Round 1	St Annes	0-18 - 4-8	Round Towers Clondalkin	Bohernabreena

13 May 2017; SFC Tournament Round 1	Fingal Ravens	2-8 - 1-10	Clontarf	Rolestown
13 May 2017; SFC Tournament Round 1	Derek Daly 0-5, Barry Caulfield (1-0 pen) and Alan Manning 1-0 each, Thomas McGrath 0-1			Rolestown

13 May 2017; SFC Tournament Round 1	Fingallians	0-17 - 2-2	Ballinteer St. John's	Lawless Park

13 May 2017; SFC Tournament Round 1	St. Peregrine's	0-19 - 1-8	St. Patrick's Palmerstown	Blakestown

13 May 2017; SFC Tournament Round 1	Erin's Isle	1-4 - 0-17	Templeogue Synge Street	Finglas

13 May 2017; SFC Tournament Round 1	Naomh Mearnóg	W/O	UCD	Portmarnock

13 May 2017; SFC Tournament Round 1	Naomh Olaf	0-14 - 1-14	Raheny	O'Brien Park
13 May 2017; SFC Tournament Round 1			Brian Fenton (1-1), Gavin Ivory, Aran Kelly (0-3) each, Sean McCarthy, Ger Coady (0-2) each, Brian Howard, Eoghan Smyth, Eoin Keogh (0-1) each.	O'Brien Park

=== SFC Tournament Quarter-Finals ===
30 September 2017; SFC Tournament Quarter-Final	Ballyboden St. Enda's	0-16 - 0-9	Templeogue Synge Street	Pairc Uí Murchu

30 September 2017; SFC Tournament Quarter-Final	Naomh Mearnóg	0-18 - 1-9	St. Peregrine's	Portmarnock

30 September 2017; SFC Tournament Quarter-Final	Raheny	1-18 - 2-13	Fingallians	St. Anne's Park
30 September 2017; SFC Tournament Quarter-Final	Gavin Ivory 1-10 (5f), Eoghan Smyth 0-3, Brian Fenton 0-2, Aran Kelly, Brian Howard, Kevin Doran 0-1 each			St. Anne's Park

30 September 2017; SFC Tournament Quarter-Final	Round Towers Clondalkin	1-13 -1-15	Fingal Ravens	Clondalkin

=== SFC Tournament Semi-Finals ===
29 October 2017; 11:00; SFC Tournament Semi-Final	Naomh Mearnóg	0-13 - 0-15	Ballyboden St. Enda's	Portmarnock

29 October 2017; 11:00; SFC Tournament Semi-Final	Fingal Ravens	0-6 - 0-17	Raheny	Rolestown
29 October 2017; 11:00; SFC Tournament Semi-Final			Brian Howard 0-5 (1f) Aran Kelly 0-4 (1f) Simon Deignan, Eoghan Smyth 0-3 each Kevin Doran 0-2	Rolestown

=== SFC Tournament Final ===
15 November 2017; 8:00 pm SFC Tournament Final	Ballyboden St. Enda's	1-17 - 1-16	Raheny	St. Margaret's
