= Crónán Mochua of Clondalkin =

Medieval Irish saint and missionary

Crónán Mochua
- Born: c. 570; County Kildare, Ireland
- Died: 6 August 630; Clondalkin, County Dublin, Ireland
- Venerated in: Roman Catholicism
- Major shrine: Clondalkin Monastery
- Feast: 6 August

Crónán Mochua (also Cronin; c. 570–630 AD) was an Irish monk and saint, founder and first abbot of Cluain Dolcáin (Clondalkin), County Dublin. He was a native Irish missionary who extended Christianity throughout South Dublin and North Kildare in the late 6th and early 7th centuries.

== Biography ==
Mochua was born c. 570 AD, son of Lugaid and Cainer of Cluain da Saileach, and had six sainted brothers. According to tradition, Mochua was a descendant of Cathair Mór, and also belonged to the Laighin.

Mochua worked along the eastern section of Slighe Mhór, one of Ireland's five great highways, which extended from Dublin Bay to Galway Bay and passed through North Kildare

He founded Clondalkin monastery, becoming its first abbot and bishop. The monastery flourished and remained under Glendalough (ruled by Saint Kevin) until the 12th century, when it became a parish church. His successors included St. Ferfugaill (died 784) and Cathal mac Corbmaic (died 879), both bishop-abbots.

He subsequently founded churches at Celbridge (taking over a pre-Christian spring site that became known as Tobar Mochua) and at Tea Lane Graveyard, and built a church near Balraheen around 620 AD on the site of an ancient Iron Age burial ground.

According to tradition, Mochua baptized the young Saint Cóemgen (Kevin) and surrendered Clondalkin to him. Later sources suggest that they were brothers, though this is historically uncertain and likely reflects cult-fragmentation in medieval hagiography.

Mochua died at Clondalkin on 6 August 630 AD. The Annals of Ulster record that his relics were taken on a tour of Ireland in 790 AD, alongside those of Saint Kevin. The round tower at Clondalkin was built around this time, possibly to preserve and venerate Mochua's relics. Pilgrims travelled to his holy well at Celbridge for patterns (festivals) on his feast day until the late 18th century.

== Sites and legacy ==
Mochua's foundations included:

- Clondalkin – His primary monastery
- Celbridge – His second foundation, with a baptismal well (Tobar Mochua); Scoil Mochua school opened in 1985.
- Tea Lane Graveyard (Kildrought) – Church built by Mochua
- Balraheen – Founded c. 620 AD at an ancient burial site; school built 1930 in nearby Rathcoffey named for him.
- Timahoe – Named Tigh Mochua (Mochua's House); possibly associated with his missionary work.

His influence extended throughout the Slighe Mhór corridor via daughter houses at Kilmahuddrick, Kilmactalway, and Kilbride.

=== Round tower ===
Clondalkin Round Tower, built on the site of Mochua's monastery in the 8th or 9th century, stands 27.5 metres high and is one of four surviving round towers in County Dublin. Round towers often housed relics of monastery founders.

=== Later revival ===
Interest in Mochua and his association with Clondalkin was revived in the 20th century: a national school in Rathcoffey was named for him in 1930, St. Mochua Historical Society was established in Timahoe in 1993, and an ecumenical service on his feast day began in Clondalkin in 2005. Celbridge Historical Society restored the Tobar Mochua monument in 2013. The monument includes an inscribed stone reading, "ancient Tobar Mochua ornamented to St. Mochua 1783", alongside a carved stone head representing Mochua.
