= Catherine Sullivan (disambiguation) =

Catherine, Katherine or Kathryn Sullivan may refer to:

- Kathryn D. Sullivan (born 1951), retired NASA astronaut, first American woman to walk in space
- Catherine Sullivan (born 1968), Chicago based artist
- Kathy Sullivan (Australian politician) (born 1942), Kathryn Sullivan, former Australian politician
- Kathy Sullivan (Katherine Sullivan), married name of the fictional character Kathy Beale

== See also ==
- Kathy Sullivan (disambiguation)
- Kate Sullivan (disambiguation)
- Katie Sullivan (disambiguation)
- Kathleen Sullivan (disambiguation)
