= Kate Sullivan (model) =

Irish International plus-size model

Kate Sullivan (Vogelaar) is an Irish International plus-size model. She was the first plus-size model to make top 30 in Miss Universe Ireland 2017, feature at Milan and Barcelona Fashion Week (2016), Top Model UK 2nd Runner Up 2015 and SimplyBe Curvy Competition finalist 2014, features regularly on TV3 Ireland AM's fashion slot and has featured in Woman's Way magazine numerous times and also The Herald, RSVP magazine, The Sunday World and The Independent. In 2017, Sullivan opened an exclusively plus-size agency supplying models for the Commercial and Fashion Industry in Ireland and internationally (KSV Model Agency). One of the first plus-size models to feature on Irish television wearing a swimsuit. She is the granddaughter of trumpet player Eddie Sullivan from The Royal Showband.

http://www.irishexaminer.com/lifestyle/features/model-behaviour-plus-size-on-the-runway-can-still-raise-eyebrows-452003.html
