= Lisa Madden =

Irish model and beauty pageant winner (born 1992)

- Born: 27 August 1992 (age 34); Cork, Ireland
- Height: 5 ft 9 in (1.75 m)
- Beauty pageant titleholder
- Title: Miss Universe Ireland 2014
- Hair color: Brown
- Eye color: Blue
- Major competitions: Miss Universe Ireland 2014 (Winner); Miss Universe 2014 (Unplaced)

Lisa Madden (born 27 August 1992) is an Irish model and beauty pageant titleholder who was crowned Miss Universe Ireland 2014 and represented Ireland at Miss Universe 2014.

== Modelling ==
=== The Model Agent ===
In 2009, Madden was a contestant on The Model Agent, a televised modelling competition that aired on RTÉ2. She was eliminated in the second episode.

=== Britain & Ireland's Next Top Model ===
In 2012, Madden participated in the eighth cycle of Britain & Ireland's Next Top Model, the British and Irish version of America's Next Top Model, where she became the eleventh eliminated.

== Pageantry ==
=== Miss Universe Ireland 2014 ===
Madden was crowned as Miss Universe Ireland 2014, where she represented Cork.

=== Miss Universe 2014 ===
Madden competed at Miss Universe 2014. She did not place.

Awards and achievements
Preceded by Adrienne Murphy	Miss Universe Ireland; 2014	Succeeded by Joanna Cooper
