= Miss Universe Ireland 2017 =

Beauty pageant edition

- Date: 31 August 2017
- Presenters: James Patrice and Brittany Mason
- Entertainment: Allie Sherlock
- Venue: Mansion House, Dublin, Ireland
- Broadcaster: YouTube, NSC TV and Facebook Live
- Entrants: 30
- Placements: 10
- Winner: Cailín Toíbín
- Congeniality: Leah Headon
- Photogenic: Caoimhe O'Dwyer

Miss Universe Ireland 2017, was the 54th edition of the Miss Universe Ireland. 30 finalists competed for the title of Miss Universe Ireland. Director Brittany Mason crowned Cailín Toíbín as the new Miss Universe Ireland.

== Results ==
Final Results	Contestant
Miss Universe Ireland 2017	Cailín Toíbín
1st Runner-Up	Kelly Horrigan
2nd Runner-Up	Caoimhe O'Dwyer
3rd Runner-Up	Aoife McGrane
4th Runner-Up	Andrea Rooney
Top 10	Áine May Kennedy; Jade O'Neill; Jill Connolly; Roísín Gallagher; Sophie Amelia Bahl

== Semi-finalist ==
30 finalists competed for the title:

Contestant	Age	Hometown
Aine Kennedy	20	Dublin
Alise Mūrniece	22	Drogheda
Andrea Rooney	18	Dublin
Angela Ferris	25	Bray
Aoife McGrane	20	Limerick
Cailín Áine Ní Toíbín	23	Cork
Caoimhe Dwyer	23	Kinsale
Elmo Gilbot	21	Dublin
Hayleigh O'Driscoll	21	Carlow
Hannah Hawkshaw	20	Dublin
Hope Hickey	21	Cork
Jadey Manalo	22	Ennis
Jasmine Gerdhardt	26	Dundalk
Jessica Palmer	22	Waterford
Jill Connolly	19	Navan
Julieann McStravick	20	Stoneyford
Kate Vogelaar	23	Cork
Kayleigh Hone	23	Donegal
Kelly Horrigan	23	Tralee
Leanne Gray	24	Dublin
Leah Headon	22	Kildare
Mariam Matras	20	Athlone
Megan O'Kane	24	Dublin
Roisin Gallagher	18	Donegal
Sarah Kinsella	24	Dublin
Simone Crawford	25	Cork
Sinead Cifford	25	Wexford
Sophia Amelia Bahl	18	Cork
Sophie Crinnion	20	Dublin

== Crossovers ==
Miss Earth

- 2016: Northern Ireland: Julieann McStravick (Top 16)
