= Kathleen Sullivan =

Kathleen Sullivan may refer to:

- Kathleen Sullivan (lawyer) (born 1955), American lawyer and former dean of Stanford Law School
- Kathleen Sullivan (journalist) (born 1953), American television journalist
- Kathleen Sullivan Alioto (born 1944), American educator and politician
- Kathy Sullivan (American politician) (born 1954), Kathleen Sullivan, former Chairwoman of the Democratic Party in New Hampshire

== See also ==
- Kathy Sullivan (disambiguation)
- Kate Sullivan (disambiguation)
- Katie Sullivan (disambiguation)
- Catherine Sullivan (disambiguation)
