= Katie Sullivan =

Katie or Katy Sullivan may refer to:

- Katie Sullivan (politician), member of the Montana House of Representatives
- Katie Sullivan (soccer), American soccer player
- Katy Sullivan, track and field paralympian
- Katie Sullivan (curler) in 2012 United States Junior Curling Championships
- Katie Kim (Irish musician), Katie Sullivan, Irish musician

== See also ==
- Kate Sullivan (disambiguation)
- Catherine Sullivan (disambiguation)
- Kathleen Sullivan (disambiguation)
- Kathy Sullivan (disambiguation)
