= Moyle Park College =

Secondary school in County Dublin, Ireland

Coordinates: 53.3205°N 6.3968°W

- Clondalkin, County Dublin; Ireland

Information
- Established: 1957; 69 years ago

Moyle Park College is a secondary school in Clondalkin, County Dublin, Ireland.

== History ==
The school was established by the Marist Brothers in 1957, and grew alongside the population of the local area. As of the 2017 school year, no more Marist Brothers taught in the school. In 2007 Moyle Park College celebrated its Golden Jubilee. On 13 October a ceremony was held in the sports hall to mark the occasion. This was attended by the then President of Ireland Mary McAleese who also opened the Golden Jubilee Garden. Niamh Cahalane took over as principal from Maurice Hartigan in August 2016.

During the summer months, the college is host to Moyle Park English Language College. This summer project sees more than 300 international students come to the college to learn English as a second language. Students come from Argentina, Brazil, Spain, France and Italy and stay in the Clondalkin, Palmerstown, Ballyfermot, Tallaght and Lucan areas of Dublin.

== Notable past pupils ==
Notable past pupils include:

- John Curran, Irish politician and government minister
- Jim Gavin, former Dublin Senior football manager
- Jack Sheedy, former Longford Senior football manager
- Derek Murray, former Dublin Senior footballer
- Kenny Egan, Olympic boxer
- Brian Ormond, TV presenter
- Aidomo Emakhu, association footballer
- Sinclair Armstrong, association footballer with the Republic of Ireland U21 national team
