= Grainne Gallanagh =

Irish model and beauty pageant titleholder

- Born: 22 June 1994 (age 32); Buncrana, County Donegal, Ireland
- Height: 5 ft 9 in (175 cm)
- Beauty pageant titleholder
- Title: Miss Universe Ireland 2018
- Hair color: Blonde
- Eye color: Blue
- Major competitions: Miss Earth Northern Ireland 2017 (Miss Air Northern Ireland); Miss Universe Ireland 2018 (Winner); Miss Universe 2018 (Top 20)

Grainne Gallanagh (/ˈɡrɔːnjə ˈɡælənə/; born 22 June 1994) is an Irish model and beauty pageant titleholder who was crowned Miss Universe Ireland 2018. She represented Ireland at Miss Universe 2018 and placed in the Top 20. She held the title of Miss Donegal in 2016 and was the runner up in Miss Earth NI.

== Early life ==
Gallanagh was raised in Buncrana, County Donegal. She attended Scoil Mhuire, Buncrana. She is a Bachelor of Science graduate from Letterkenny Institute of Technology and a nurse by profession specializing in Women's Health.

== Pageantry ==
=== Miss Earth Northern Ireland 2017 ===
Gallanagh was crowned as Miss Earth Northern Ireland-Air in 2017.

=== Miss Universe Ireland 2018 ===
On 2 August 2018, Gallanagh was crowned as Miss Universe Ireland 2018 at Dublin’s Mansion House. She succeeded outgoing Miss Universe Ireland 2017 and Miss Universe 2017 Top 16 semifinalist Cailín Toibín.

=== Miss Universe 2018 ===
She represented Ireland at the Miss Universe 2018 finals and placed Top 20.

== Media career ==
Gallanagh appeared on the fourth season of the Irish edition of Dancing with the Stars in 2020. She reached the final with her professional partner, finishing as runners-up. Gallanagh appears regularly as a guest host on Virgin Media One's The Six O'Clock Show. In 2021, Gallanagh appeared on a charity special of Ireland's Fittest Family. Her team reached the final race and eventually finished as runners-up.

== Personal life ==
Gallanagh is a nurse and was working in London when she won the Miss Universe Ireland title in 2018. She moved to Perth, Western Australia with her long-term fiancé in March 2023. She worked for a year in an Australian construction mine site on a Fly-in fly-out basis.

Awards and achievements
Preceded by Cailín Toibín	Miss Universe Ireland; 2018	Succeeded by Fionnghuala O'Reilly
