= Adrienne Murphy =

Irish model (born 1990)

- Born: Adrienne Murphy; 1990 (age 35–36); Clondalkin, Ireland
- Height: 1.73 m (5 ft 8 in)
- Beauty pageant titleholder
- Title: Miss Universe Ireland 2012
- Hair color: Black
- Eye color: Blue
- Major competitions: Miss Universe Ireland 2012 (Winner); Miss Universe 2012

Adrienne Murphy (born 1990) is an Irish model and beauty pageant titleholder who was crowned Miss Universe Ireland 2012 and represented Ireland at the Miss Universe 2012 pageants.

Murphy first won the title of Miss Dandelion. Coming from the working class town of Clondalkin, she was awarded the Miss Universe Ireland crown on 2 November 2012. She then traveled to the 2012 Miss Universe pageant in Las Vegas held in December 2012.

== Life and career ==
Murphy is an advertising and marketing student in Ireland, and has also done modeling.

Awards and achievements
Preceded by Aoife Hannon	Miss Universe Ireland; 2012	Succeeded by Lisa Madden
