= Fionnghuala O'Reilly =

Model and Miss Universe Ireland 2019

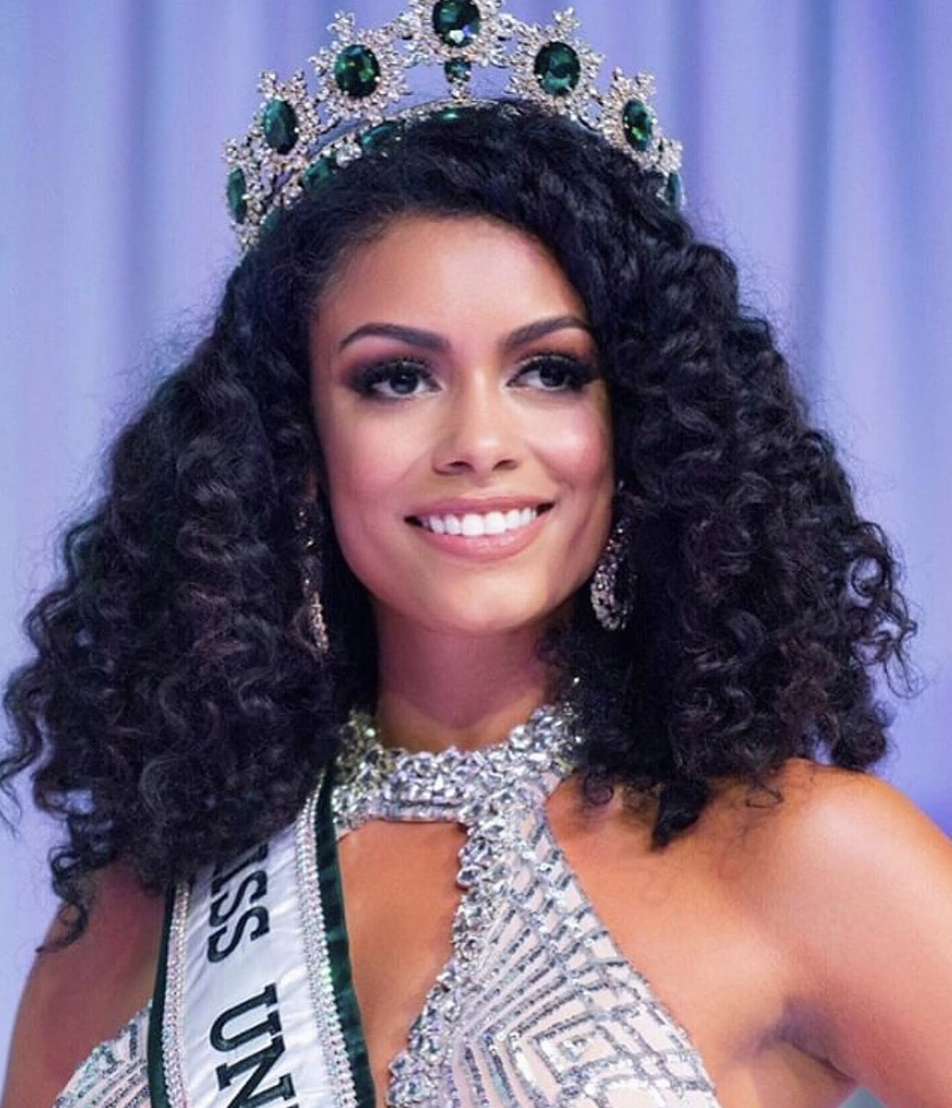
- O'Reilly at Miss Universe Ireland 2019
- Born: 20 August 1993 (age 33); Fort Knox, Kentucky, U.S.
- Occupations: Model, beauty pageant titleholder
- Height: 1.75 m (5 ft 9 in)
- Beauty pageant titleholder
- Title: Miss Universe Ireland 2019
- Major competitions: Miss Universe Ireland 2019 (Winner); Miss Universe 2019 (Unplaced)
- Website: figoreilly.com

Fionnghuala "Fig" O'Reilly (born 20 August 1993) is an Irish-American model and beauty pageant titleholder, and a data analyst. In 2019 she was crowned Miss Universe Ireland. She made history as the first woman of color and Black woman to represent Ireland at the international Miss Universe competition.

In 2020, Fionnghuala joined Miranda Cosgrove on CBS's Daytime Emmy-nominated television series Mission Unstoppable as the newest correspondent. Fionnghuala also joined the cast of HBO Max Best Documentary nominated film Twenty Pearls directed by Deborah Riley Draper.

== Life and career ==
=== Early life ===
Fionnghuala, who often goes by "Fig," was born to an Irish father and African American mother. O'Reilly signed her first model contract at 19 with an agency in Milan, Italy. She has a Bachelor of Science in Systems Engineering from The George Washington University in Washington, D.C., which she has used to become a NASA Datanaut and regional director of NASA's Space Apps Challenge in Washington, DC.

O'Reilly is a member of Alpha Kappa Alpha.

=== Pageantry ===
In 2017, O'Reilly competed in Miss District of Columbia USA 2018, where she won a swimsuit award winner and placed as the third runner-up. On August 1, 2019, O'Reilly competed as Miss Dublin in the Miss Universe Ireland 2019 pageant in Dublin, Ireland. She won the competition in a historic moment as the first woman of colour to do so in the pageants history since 1961. She was crowned by the outgoing titleholder, Grainne Gallanagh. As Miss Universe Ireland, she represented Ireland at the Miss Universe 2019 pageant and her platform spotlighted the need for diversity and women in STEM (science, technology, engingeering, and math). She ultimately finished Unplaced.

=== Philanthropy ===
In 2021, O'Reilly received the AAIDN Heritage and Diaspora Spirit Award from the African American Irish Diaspora Network's Inaugural Diaspora Leadership Awards Gala, hosted by Mary McAleese. In 2022, O'Reilly launched Space to Reach, an organization dedicated to advancing Black to Brown women in STEM.

== Data analysis ==
O'Reilly works for NASA as a data analyst. She is a director of the NASA International Space Apps Challenge initiative run by NASA.

Awards and achievements
Preceded by Grainne Gallanagh	Miss Universe Ireland; 2019	Succeeded by Nadia Sayers
