= Miss Universe Ireland 2009 =

- Date: June 26, 2009
- Presenters: Rosanna Davison, Lisa Fitzpatrick
- Venue: Abbey Theatre, Dublin, Ireland
- Entrants: 22
- Debuts: Northern Ireland
- Winner: Diana Donnelly; Club 92

The Winner of the Miss Universe Ireland 2009 was awarded to Diana Donelly. It was held on June 26, 2009, at the Abbey Theatre in Dublin. There the county pageants were present from March to June 1.

== Results ==
| Final results | Contestant |
|---|---|
| Miss Universe Ireland 2009 | Club 92 - Diana Donnelly |
| 1st Runner-up | Lillies Bordello - Rozanna Purcell |
| 2nd Runner-up | Irish Sun - Hazel Britton |
| 3rd Runner-up | Irish American Community - Maryann Williams |
| 4th Runner-up | Offaly - Mary O’Brien |
| Top 10 | Nass Court Hotel - Jill Macken; Tipperary - Toni Harney; Waterford - Bebhinn MacGrath; News of the World - Haley Ryan; Taboo Navan - Emma Quinlann |

=== Special awards ===
- Miss Photogenic - Rozanna Purcell (Lillies Bordello)
- Miss Congeniality - Kerri O’Connor (Kerry)
- Miss Fashion - Ashley McNicholas (Athlone)
- Miss Internet - Rozanna Purcell (Lillies Bordello)

== Contestants ==
| County | Contestant | Age | Height | Hometown |
|---|---|---|---|---|
| Athlone | Ashley McNicholas | 18 | 5'11" | Athlone |
| Bondi | Michelle Cummins | 24 | 5'5" | Dublin |
| Bourjoi | Eileen Crerar | 18 | 5'7" | Cork |
| Club 92 | Diana Donnelly | 20 | 5'9" | Dublin |
| Cork | Aoife Turner | 22 | 5'10" | Douglas |
| Dublin | Alma McCabe | 20 | 6'0" | Dublin |
| Hotspots | Suzanne Jackson | 24 | 5'6" | Shannon |
| Irish American Community | Maryann Williams | 18 | 5'9" | Columbus |
| Irish Sun | Hazel Britton | 21 | 5'8" | Donegal |
| Kerry | Kerri O’Connor | 22 | 5'11" | Killarney |
| Laois | Tara Lunch | 19 | 5'9" | Portlaoise |
| Lillies Bordello | Rozanna Purcell | 18 | 5'11" | Shannon |
| Nass Court Hotel | Jill Macken | 21 | 5'4" | Galway |
| National Capital | Judy Kelleher | 19 | 6'0" | Dublin |
| News of the World | Haley Ryan | 21 | 6'0" | Limerick |
| Northern Ireland | Claire Murray | 19 | 5'9" | Belfast |
| Offaly | Mary Beth O’Brien | 23 | 5'8" | Cork |
| Spin South West | Caitriona Hoy | 19 | 5'9" | Limerick |
| Taboo Navan | Emma Quinlann | 25 | 5'11" | Galway |
| Tipperary | Toni Harney | 24 | 5'8" | Hollyford |
| University College Dublin | Alyson Boyle | 20 | 5'9" | Dublin |
| Waterford | Bebhinn MacGrath | 19 | 5'7" | Waterford |

== Controversy ==
It was reported that the pageant was sponsored by Educogym, a concept gym created by Tony Quinn. At the launch contestants were photographed wearing sashes emblazoned with the Educogym name and it was announced the winner would receive a year's membership. Co-host Lisa Fitzpatrick was reported as saying "If someone wants to read into angels then let them on and if someone else gets help from Tony Quinn's seminars then it can only be doing good for them" despite what many were calling a cult.
