= Clondalkin =

Suburban village of Dublin, Ireland

Clondalkin Cluain Dolcáin (Irish)
- Suburban village
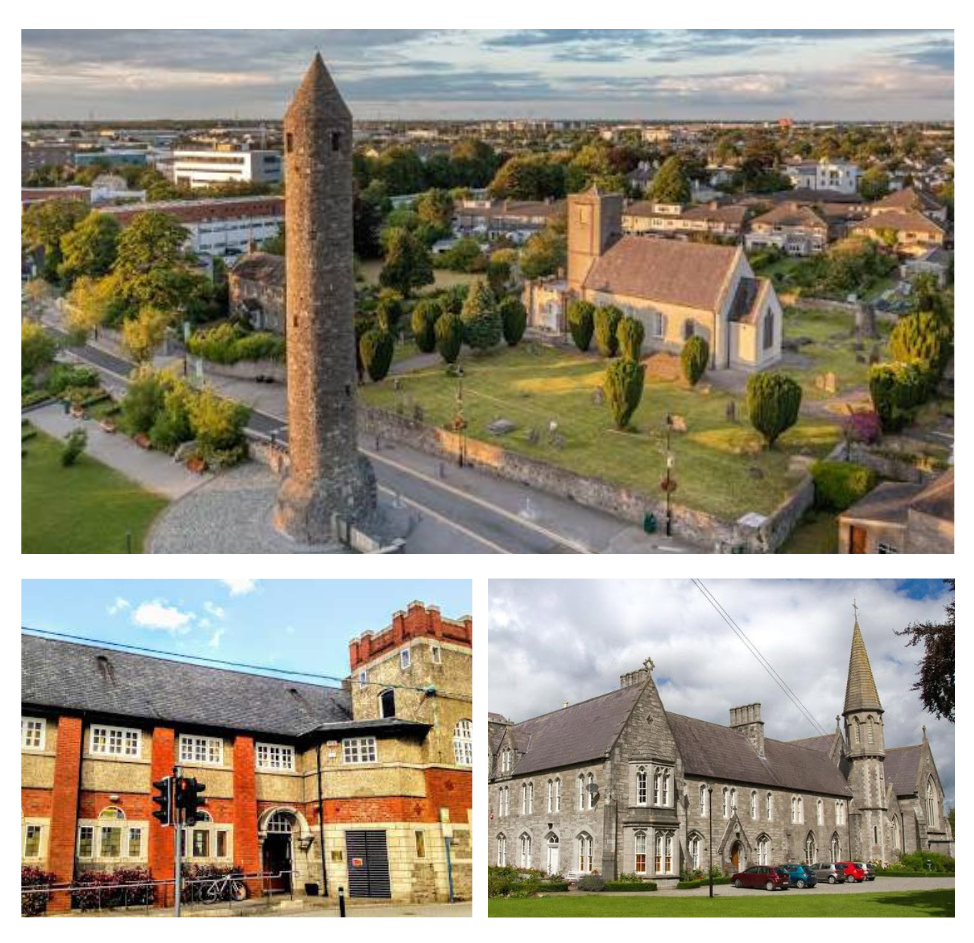
- Clockwise from top: Clondalkin Round Tower; Presentation Convent; Clondalkin Library.

- Location in Ireland Clondalkin (Ireland)
- Coordinates: 53.320°N 6.395°W
- Country: Ireland
- Province: Leinster
- County: County Dublin
- Local government area: South Dublin County Council

Government
  - Dáil constituency: Dublin Mid-West
  - Local electoral area: Clondalkin

Population (2022)
  - Electoral division: 47,938
- Eircode routing key: D22
- Irish Grid Reference: O070311

Clondalkin (Irish: Cluain Dolcáin, meaning 'pasture of Dolcán') is a suburban village in County Dublin, Ireland, approximately 10 km (6 mi) west of Dublin city centre. It is within the administrative jurisdiction of South Dublin. Founded as a monastic settlement in the early 7th century, Clondalkin rose in significance during the early medieval period, becoming home to a scriptorium that produced illuminated gospel manuscripts and to one of Ireland's earliest and slenderest round towers.

Clondalkin is also the name of a civil parish and a townland in the ancient barony of Uppercross, and is also used in relation to some local religious parishes. The population of all electoral divisions labelled as Clondalkin was 47,938 as of the 2022 census.

Despite being sacked by Vikings, the medieval village of Clondalkin grew with several streets and a large parish church, and in 1171 served as the encampment of Ruaidrí Ua Conchobair, the last High King of Ireland, as he moved to defend Dublin against the advancing forces of Richard de Clare. Clondalkin expanded from the mid-20th century as Dublin's suburbs grew westward, and is today a residential suburb of South Dublin.

== History ==
=== Prehistory ===
Neolithic tribes first settled in the area around 7,600 years ago, taking advantage of the site's location on the River Camac, overlooking the River Liffey and the inland pass between the mountains and the river. Evidence of the presence of the Cualann Celtic people (an early tribe possibly the Cauci on Ptolemy's world map) can be found in various mounds and raths.

=== Christian era ===
Clondalkin is believed to have been founded by Saint Cronan Mochua as a monastic settlement on the River Camac over 1,400 years ago (possibly late 6th or early 7th centuries). The round tower was built perhaps two centuries later (c. 790 AD) as part of the monastery. This would make it an unusual tower, as most scholars assume that the main period of their construction was between the start of the 10th century and the end of the 12th century, and that this one was built in the 10th or 11th century. By the 8th century, Saint Fugillus was Bishop of Clondalkin and noted gospel manuscripts were produced – the most famous of these being the Clondalkin Mass Book which is on display in Karlsruhe, Germany.

=== Viking arrival ===
Clondalkin was sacked by Vikings in 832 AD, and the monastery was burned to the ground. One of the early Norse kings of Dublin, Amlaíb Conung, built a fortress on the site in the middle of the 9th century. In 867, a force led by Cennétig mac Gaíthéne, king of Loígis, burned the fortress at Clondalkin and killed 100 of Amlaíb's followers. The monastery was later restored and, with help from other surrounding monasteries, and influenced the Viking settlers in their conversion to Christianity. The district remained under Norse control until the Viking defeat by Brian Boru at the Battle of Clontarf in 1014.

=== Norman era ===
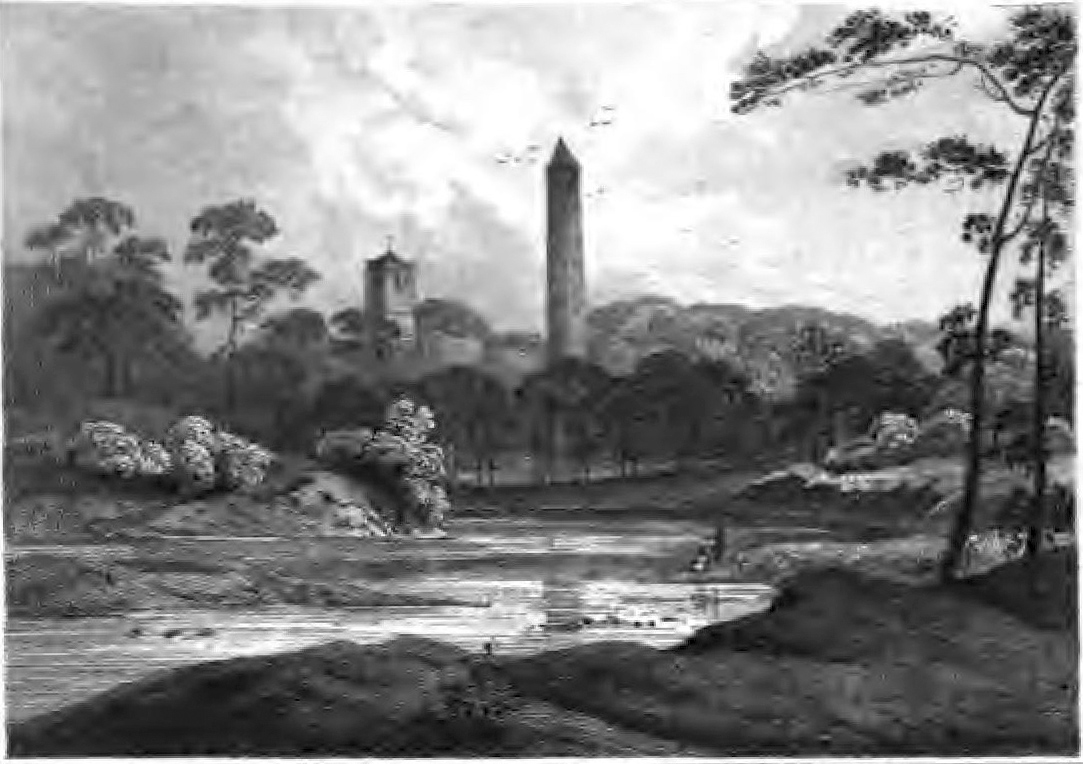
View from 1820

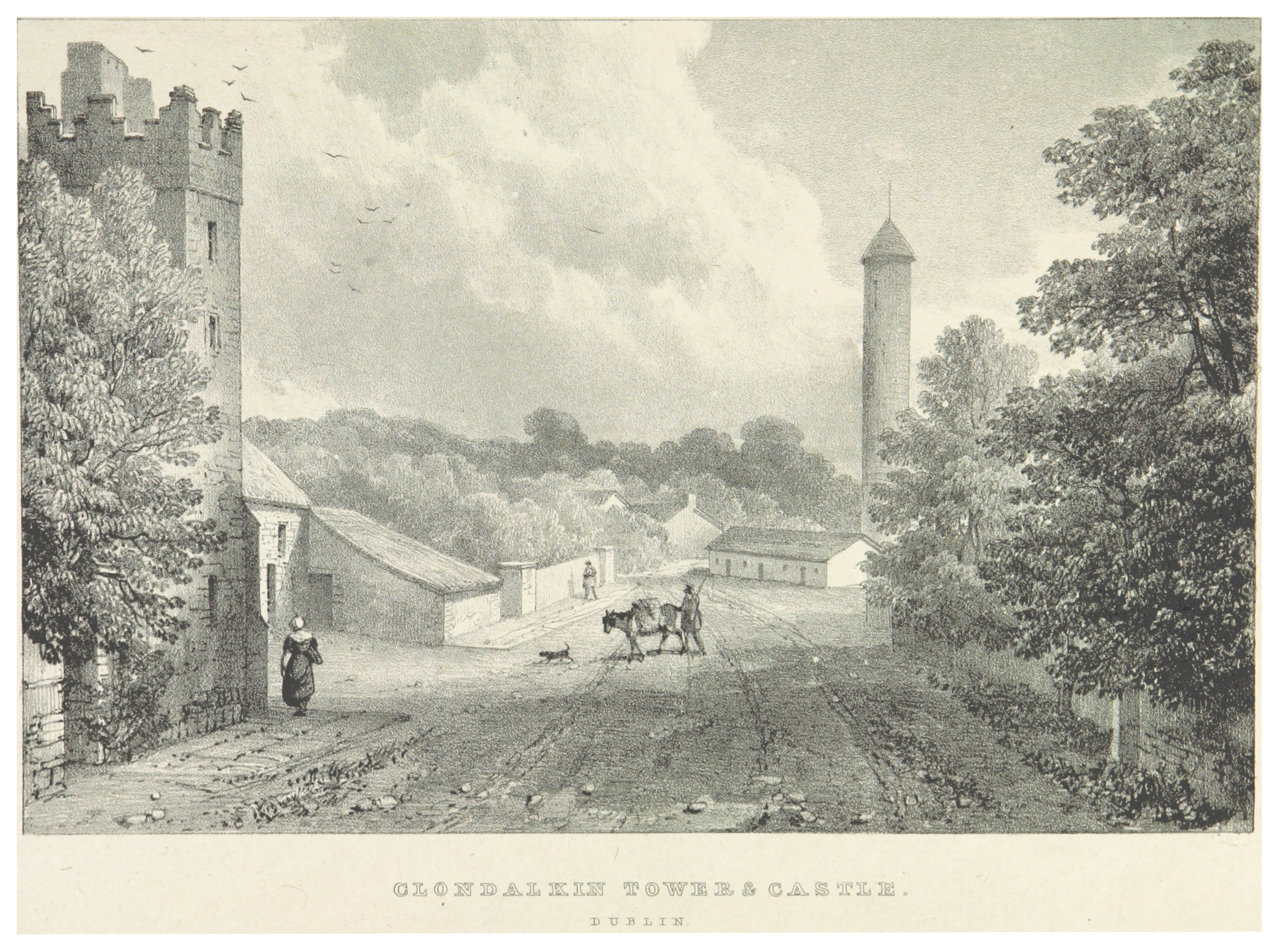
Clondalkin Castle - view from 1830

Clondalkin witnessed another historic event during the Norman invasion in 1171 with a battle there between Richard de Clare (Strongbow) and the last High King of Ireland Ruaidhrí Ua Conchabhair.

Clondalkin is a civil parish in the ancient barony of Uppercross. An exclave of the parish, consisting of the single townland of Blundelstown, is located in the neighbouring barony of Newcastle to the west.

=== 17th century and beyond ===
Centuries later, Clondalkin was the scene for some fighting in the 1641 Rebellion, when the Gaelic Irish in Ulster, and later in the rest of the kingdom, and the Old English in the Pale of Leinster rebelled against rule from Westminster. (Ireland had its own parliament at this time, but it was severely limited in its powers, e.g. by Poynings' Law.)

Clondalkin Paper Mill was established at the start of the 19th century by Thomas Seery and Son. Having changed ownership over the years, activity peaked during the First World War as the focus moved to war production. Productivity slowed until the mill closed its doors for the last time in 1987. Water to power the mill came from Brittas ponds via Saggart.

Historical population
Year	Pop.	±%
1821	597	—
1831	1,632	+173.4%
1841	505	−69.1%
1851	474	−6.1%
1861	668	+40.9%
1871	470	−29.6%
1881	379	−19.4%
1891	310	−18.2%
1901	276	−11.0%
1911	271	−1.8%
1926	345	+27.3%
1936	598	+73.3%
1946	1,042	+74.2%
1951	1,432	+37.4%
1956	3,105	+116.8%
1961	3,434	+10.6%
1966	5,079	+47.9%
1971	7,009	+38.0%
1981	23,444	+234.5%
1986	34,879	+48.8%
1991	38,489	+10.4%
1996	41,335	+7.4%
2002	42,729	+3.4%
2006	43,879	+2.7%
2011	45,165	+2.9%

== Historical features ==
A focal point for Clondalkin is the eighth-century round tower, one of the four remaining towers in the historic County Dublin. Acknowledged as one of the oldest in the country, the Clondalkin Round Tower is 25.6 metres high and has its original conical cap. While a heritage centre was opened on the site in 2017, as of December 2024 the tower's visitor centre was reportedly closed 'until further notice'.

Clondalkin is also home to a holy well, St Brigid's Well, which is said to have been used for baptising pagans by Saint Brigid in the 5th century.

Tully's Castle, now protected as a national monument, remains as one of three tower houses in Clondalkin village.

== Amenities ==
=== Facilities and services ===
The Clondalkin area had a population of 47,938 as of the 2022 census. Facilities serving the population include several supermarkets, as well as small businesses, restaurants and pubs. There is also a Garda station on Orchard Road in the village.

Clondalkin Library was opened in 1911 following a grant from Andrew Carnegie, to a design by architect, T.J. Byrne. North Clondalkin Library, a purpose-built modern facility, was opened in December 2020.

=== Parks and recreation ===
Corkagh Park, located near the Naas Road south of Clondalkin village, opened to the public in 1986 and covers 120 hectares of the former Corkagh Demesne estate. The park has several football, baseball and GAA pitches, a purpose-built cycling track, a children's playground, woodland areas, a stream, and a designated dog park. An adjacent caravan and camping park operates within the grounds.

Brú Chrónáin, the round tower visitor centre, opened in 2017 near the tower itself. The centre features an interactive multimedia exhibition housed in refurbished 19th-century mill cottages, exploring Clondalkin's monastic, Viking and more recent history.

Clondalkin Equine Club opened in 2017 as a facility for young horse owners and those learning proper urban equine care. Built with funding from the Department of Agriculture and South Dublin County Council, the club was established in response to community concerns about equine abuse and neglect. The centre was visited by President Catherine Connolly in April 2026.

=== Shopping centres ===
Liffey Valley Shopping Centre, which opened in 1998, is a major retail destination on the former Quarryvale site at the M50/N4 interchange. Originally planned for a more central location serving Clondalkin and Lucan residents at Neilstown/Balgaddy under Dublin County Council's long-standing development strategy, the centre's relocation to Quarryvale resulted from a 1991 rezoning decision later found by the Mahon Tribunal to have been secured through widespread bribery of local councillors. The centre contains approximately 85 stores, 3,500 car parking spaces, and serves an estimated 10 million visitors annually, though promised civic amenities such as a social welfare office, training centre, and library were not ultimately developed at the site.

=== Other amenities ===
The local Church of Ireland church, St. John's Church, was built in 1789 on the site of a medieval church, and extended in 1854.

The Roman Catholic Church of the Immaculate Conception and Saint Kilian had its foundation stone laid on 5 July 1857 by Archbishop Paul Cullen, and was dedicated on 11 August 1862. Designed in the Gothic Revival style, it features calp limestone quarried at Monastery Road and stained-glass windows by William Early.

In March 2014, Clondalkin became the 51st "Fairtrade town" in Ireland, with the designation marked by a ceremony at Clonburris National School. Wheatfield Prison and Cloverhill Prison are both located in the area.

== Transport ==
Clondalkin is served by public transport to Dublin city centre, to nearby suburbs, and to neighbouring settled areas such as Tallaght.

Dublin Bus provide bus routes including the 13, 60, 68, 69, 151, G2, and L54. There are also other bus routes provided by Go-Ahead Ireland such as the W2 and L51. Many of these run from areas near Clondalkin, such as Rathcoole and Newcastle, into the city centre via Clondalkin, while some of these routes link Clondalkin to other local areas such as Liffey Valley, The Square, Lucan, and Leixlip.

Clondalkin railway station opened on 4 August 1846 and was closed for goods traffic on 9 June 1947. It was reopened during the 1990s for commuter services. Commuter trains are operated by Iarnród Éireann (Irish Rail) and run between Heuston station in Dublin and Kildare Town in County Kildare. A new station, to replace rather than supplement the previous station, has been built at Fonthill, north of Bawnogue. The original Clondalkin station was demolished in 2008 to facilitate a four-line track, allowing express trains to pass through without affecting local services on the Kildare line.

Bus Éireann services stop to collect and set down passengers at Newlands Cross, on the N7 road near Clondalkin.

As of 2007, Clondalkin was included on the preferred route for the proposed Dublin Metro West line.

== Media ==
Two local newspapers, the Clondalkin Echo and Clondalkin Gazette, serve the area. The latter is published by Gazette Group Newspapers (part-owned by the Irish Times), and was launched in October 2005.

== Sport ==
=== GAA ===
Clondalkin's oldest sports club is the Round Towers GAA Club, which was founded in December 1884 and is located on Convent Road. A number of club members have represented Dublin in the inter-county competition since the nineteenth century, when Tom Errity won several All-Ireland Senior Football medals in the 1890s. Jim Gavin, also a club member, won an All-Ireland senior medal with Dublin in 1995 and several as a manager in the 2010s.

=== Soccer ===
The local association football team, Clondalkin Celtic F.C., was formed in 1969. It fields teams in the Dublin and District Schoolboys League.

Former association football teams in the area included Moyle Park Past Pupils FC, and Neilstown Rangers (past winners of the FAI Junior Cup). St Francis Boys FC have been at home at John Hyland Park, Baldonnel, close to Clondalkin since relocating from their original home in The Liberties.

Collinstown FC, Liffey Valley Rangers and Clondalkin Celtic F.C. are also emerging soccer clubs in the area.

=== Rugby ===
Rugby union is played at Clondalkin Rugby Club, Kingswood, who were winners of the 2006 Spencer Cup and 2006 Under-18 Premier League. The club was formed in 1973–74 and fields several senior, underage and youth teams.

=== Boxing ===
Bernard Dunne the former WBA Super Bantamweight World Champion is from Neilstown in Clondalkin. Kenny Egan, winner of a silver medal for boxing in the 2008 Olympics, comes from Clondalkin, originally Woodford estate.

=== Other sports ===
The national baseball facility in Ireland, O'Malley Field, is located in Corkagh Demesne Park, in southwest Clondalkin. This is the home of the Irish national baseball team.

== Education ==
Clondalkin has a number of primary and secondary schools of different denominations.

Among its primary (national) schools are Clonburris National School, Sacred Heart Sruleen National School, Scoil Íde Primary School, Scoil Áine, St John's National School (Church of Ireland), Scoil Mhuire, Talbot Senior National School, Scoil Nano Nagle, Gaelscoil Chluain Dolcáin, St. Ronan's National School, St. Peter Apostle Junior National School, St. Bernadette's Junior National School, and St. Bernadette's Senior National School.

The secondary schools in the area include Moyle Park College (boys), Deansrath Community College, Coláiste Bríde (girls), Coláiste Chilliain, Collinstown Park Community College, and St. Kevin's Community College.

The Clondalkin area has three Gaelscoileanna (Irish-language schools). These include Gaelscoil Chluain Dolcáin and Gaelscoil na Camóige at primary level and Coláiste Chilliain at second level.

== Local organisations ==
Community organisations include a unit of Toastmasters International, an Order of Malta branch and several youth groups. There is also a Scout group, affiliated to Scouting Ireland, Boy's and Girl's Brigade companies, and units of the Irish Girl Guides and Brownies. Local drama groups include Clondalkin Drama Group and Clondalkin Youth Theatre (associated with the Irish National Association for Youth Drama).

The village is home to St Joseph's Pipe band, which has won several competitions in Ireland and the UK. The Clondalkin Youth Band, also based locally, was founded in 1986.

The Clondalkin Tidy Towns group was established in 2012. They were awarded the South Dublin County Community Group of the Year 2012 and were also runners-up in the Pride of Place Award for 2012. In June 2023 they were amongst the winners of South Dublin County Council's Mayor's Community Hero Awards.

== Irish language ==
Áras Chrónáin promotes Irish language and culture (including music and dance). Muintir Chrónáin, the organisation that runs the centre, was established in 1972 and has developed a series of Irish-medium projects including Scoil Chrónáin (1975), Naíonra Chrónáin (1979), Coláiste Chilliain (1981), Gaelscoil Chluain Dolcáin (1984), Gaelscoil na Camóige (1993) and the Áras Chrónáin Cultural Centre itself (1990).

In 2018, Clondalkin was named one of the five towns in Ireland, outside the traditional Gaeltacht areas, to receive official recognition as an Irish speaking community. Clondalkin was formally designated as an Irish language network under the Gaeltacht Act 2012, with a Language Plan for the area approved in 2020 aimed at increasing the everyday use of Irish within the community. In December 2023, the department awarded Muintir Chrónáin a further grant toward a feasibility study on developing Irish-medium early years services in the area.

== Politics and local government ==
Clondalkin is part of the Dáil constituency of Dublin Mid-West. It is mostly within the local electoral area of Clondalkin for elections to South Dublin County Council (along with Rathcoole, Newcastle and Saggart), with parts in the Tallaght Central local electoral area. The Clondalkin local electoral area includes the electoral divisions of Clondalkin-Dunawley, Clondalkin Village, Newcastle, Rathcoole, Saggart, some parts of the electoral division of Clondalkin-Monastery, and sections of the electoral divisions of Clondalkin-Cappaghmore and Clondalkin-Moorfield.

== People ==
- Karl Bermingham, footballer
- Mic Christopher, singer-songwriter
- Brendan Courtney, television presenter
- Seán Dillon, footballer
- Bernard Dunne, boxer
- Kenny Egan, boxer and politician
- Jim Gavin, footballer and manager
- Mary Kennedy, television host
- Cathal Mac Coille, broadcaster and journalist
- Sinéad Mulvey, singer, represented Ireland in the 2009 Eurovision Song Contest
- Adrienne Murphy, model and Miss Universe Ireland 2012
- Derek Murray, footballer
- Graham Norton, comedian and presenter
- Neil O'Donoghue, American footballer
- Keith Quinn, former footballer
- Stephen Quinn, footballer
- Dermot Ryan, Archbishop of Dublin (1972–1984)
- Aidan Turner, actor
- Katharine Tynan, novelist
- Glenn Whelan, footballer
- Arthur Wolfe, 1st Viscount Kilwarden, politician and judge
- Simon Young, broadcaster

== Climate ==
The climate in this area has mild differences between highs and lows, and there is adequate rainfall year-round. The Köppen Climate Classification subtype for this climate is "Cfb" (Marine West Coast Climate/Oceanic climate).

Climate data for Clondalkin
Month	Jan	Feb	Mar	Apr	May	Jun	Jul	Aug	Sep	Oct	Nov	Dec	Year
Mean daily maximum °C (°F)	8 (46)	8 (47)	10 (50)	12 (54)	15 (59)	18 (64)	20 (68)	19 (67)	17 (63)	13 (56)	10 (50)	8 (47)	13 (56)
Mean daily minimum °C (°F)	2 (36)	2 (36)	3 (38)	4 (39)	7 (44)	9 (49)	12 (53)	11 (52)	9 (49)	7 (45)	4 (40)	2 (36)	6 (43)
Average precipitation mm (inches)	66 (2.6)	51 (2)	51 (2)	48 (1.9)	61 (2.4)	53 (2.1)	51 (2)	64 (2.5)	71 (2.8)	71 (2.8)	69 (2.7)	79 (3.1)	730 (28.9)
Source: Weatherbase
