= John O'Brien (Dublin footballer) =

Irish Gaelic footballer

Personal information
- Native name: Seán Ó Briain (Irish)
- Born: Dublin, Ireland
- Occupation: Garda

Sport
- Sport: Gaelic football
- Position: Left corner forward
Club
- Years: Club
- Round Towers
College
- Years: College
- Garda Síochána College
Inter-county
- Years: County
- 2008: Dublin

John O'Brien is a Gaelic footballer who played for the Round Towers club and at senior level for the Dublin county team. He made his debut in the 2008 O'Byrne Cup against Wicklow.

O'Brien made his NFL debut for Dublin against Westmeath in the first round. He was on Dublin's winning team for the 2008 O'Byrne Cup winning team which defeated Longford in the final.
