= Kathy Sullivan =

Kathy or Kathie Sullivan may refer to:

- Kathy Sullivan (Australian politician) (born 1942), Kathryn Sullivan, former Australian politician
- Kathy Sullivan (American politician) (born 1954), Kathleen Sullivan, former Chairwoman of the Democratic Party in New Hampshire
- Kathy Sullivan (EastEnders), fictional character better known as Kathy Beale
- Kathie Sullivan (born 1953), American gospel singer and performer on the Lawrence Welk Show
- Kathryn D. Sullivan (born 1951), also called "Kathy", American geologist and former NASA astronaut

== See also ==
- Kathleen Sullivan (disambiguation)
- Kathryn Sullivan (disambiguation)
- Catherine Sullivan (disambiguation)
- Kate Sullivan (disambiguation)
- Katie Sullivan (disambiguation)
