= Mary Gormley =

Northern Irish model

Mary Gormley (born c. 1983) is a Northern Irish model and beauty pageant titleholder.

In 2004, Gormley competed in Miss Northern Ireland and placed third. Due to Gormley's dual citizenship (UK & Ireland), she was able to win the Irish national title of Miss Universe Ireland.

She competed as Miss Ireland in Miss Universe 2005, an international beauty pageant won by Canada's Natalie Glebova.

Gormley worked for the ACA Model Agency in Belfast and had a contract with 1st Option Model Agency in Dublin.
