= Cailín Ní Toibín =

Irish beauty pageant titleholder (born 1994)

Cailín Áine Ní Toibín
- Born: 25 February 1994 (age 32); Cork, Ireland
- Height: 5 ft 9 in (175 cm)
- Beauty pageant titleholder
- Title: Miss Universe Ireland 2017
- Hair color: Blonde
- Eye color: Blue
- Major competitions: Miss Universe Ireland 2015 (2nd Runner-Up); Miss Universe Ireland 2017 (Winner); Miss Universe 2017 (Top 16)

Cailín Áine Ní Toibín (born 25 February 1994) is an Irish beauty pageant titleholder who was crowned Miss Universe Ireland 2017 on 31 August 2017. She represented Ireland at Miss Universe 2017.

== Pageantry ==
=== Miss Universe Ireland 2015 ===
Prior to her victory in Miss Universe Ireland 2017, Cailín Áine Ní Toibín was crowned Miss Universe Cork in 2015. She would then place as 2nd Runner-up in Miss Universe Ireland 2015, losing to Joanna Cooper.

=== Miss Universe Ireland 2017 ===
Toíbin was crowned Miss Universe Ireland 2017.

=== Miss Universe 2017 ===
Toíbin represented Ireland at the Miss Universe 2017 in Las Vegas, Nevada, where she was one of the semi-finalist Top 16 and was one of the continental winner from Europe (Top 4).

Awards and achievements
Preceded by Joanna Cooper	Miss Universe Ireland; 2017	Succeeded by Grainne Gallanagh
