= Derek Murray (Gaelic footballer) =

Irish Gaelic footballer

Personal information
- Native name: Derek Ó Muirí (Irish)
- Born: Dublin, Ireland

Sport
- Sport: Gaelic football
- Position: Forward
Club
- Years: Club
- Round Towers
Inter-county
- Years: County
- 2006 -: Dublin
Inter-county titles
- Leinster titles: 3

Derek Murray is an Irish Gaelic footballer who has played for the Clondalkin-based Round Towers club and for the Dublin county team. He won three Leinster Senior Football Championship titles between 2006 and 2008. He is also a teacher for Clonburris National School in Clondalkin.

== Club football ==
Derek Murray, who is from Clondalkin in Dublin, attended Moyle Park Secondary School in Clondalkin Village. As of 2007, Murray was playing his club football for Round Towers GAA Club in Clondalkin. His brother, Damien, was also a member of the club.

== Inter-county career ==
Murray was part of the Dublin team that won the All-Ireland under-21 title in 2003.

He made his debut for Dublin in the 2006 O'Byrne Cup. He was rewarded with a starting place for Dublin vs Tyrone in the first round of the 2006 Allianz National League. However, Murray did not make the 2006 All-Ireland squad. He did, however, take part in training sessions and was a Maor Uisce for Dublin's Leinster/All Ireland Championship campaign.

Murray regained a place on the Dublin panel for the 2007 O'Byrne Cup. He was part of the winning 2007 O'Byrne Cup team with the final finishing, in extra time, on a scoreline of 1-18 to 2-13 against Laois. Murray was also on Dublin's winning team for the 2008 O'Byrne Cup, in which Dublin defeated Longford in the final.

== Management ==
Murray has been part of the management team with the Dublin county ladies' football team since 2022.
