= Miss Universe Ireland =

National beauty pageant competition in Ireland

MUIO
- Formation: 2002; 24 years ago
- Type: Beauty pageant
- Headquarters: Dublin
- Location: Ireland
- Members: Miss Universe
- Official language: English
- Staff: One Stop Productions

Miss Universe Ireland is a national beauty pageant that has selected Ireland's representative to the Miss Universe pageant since 2002.

== History ==
Beginning in 2002 Andrea Roche, who represented Ireland at Miss Universe 1998 in the United States, was the national director of Miss Universe in Ireland. Through the Andrea Roche Model agency, the contestants trained to be the next representative of Ireland at the contest. Between 2002 and 2015 the Andrea Roche era resulted in only one high-placed result in Miss Universe, in 2010, with Rozanna Purcell.

== Missions ==
Through the organization, the winner is provided a platform based on her objectives for the year. She will serve as ambassador for the country of Ireland. She will be the face of beauty and fashion brands and bring awareness to social causes for the greater good of communities across Ireland. Alongside The Miss Universe Ireland Organization, she will plan how to achieve her personal and professional goals on the national and global scale.

== Formats ==
- Personal Interview: Contestant's will be judged by their ability to articulate themselves. This is the opportunity for the judges to get to know who you are.
- Swimwear competition: Each contestant will walk the runway during the swimsuit segment displaying her dedication to a healthy lifestyle.
- Evening Gown competition: The judges and fans will see the contestants’ personal style as they walk the stage in their evening gown of choice. However, the exact design of the gown does not count towards the total score and instead the judges focus on how confidently each woman presents herself.

== Notes ==
=== Controversies ===
In 2009 it was reported that the pageant was sponsored by Educogym, a concept gym created by Tony Quinn. At the launch contestants were photographed wearing sashes emblazoned with the Educogym name and it was announced the winner would receive a year's membership. Co-host Lisa Fitzpatrick was reported as saying "If someone wants to read into angels then let them on and if someone else gets help from Tony Quinn's seminars then it can only be doing good for them" despite what many were calling a cult.

=== Miss Universe Ireland 2010 ===
- In 2010 Rozanna Purcell was offered a contract with Trump Model Management after the Miss Universe 2010 competition ended, and was offered additional contracts in Mexico and Colombia. She was then invited to judge at the Miss Venezuela 2010 pageant.

== Titleholders ==
=== Miss Universe Ireland ===
- : Declared as Winner
- : Ended as runner-up or top 5/6 qualification
- : Ended as one of the finalists or semifinalists
- : Ended as special awards winner

Miss Universe Ireland has started to send a Miss Ireland to Miss Universe from 1961. Before 2002 the winner of Miss Ireland went to Miss Universe. Started in 2002 the first annual Miss Universe Ireland has been held by Andrea Roche (former Miss Ireland 1998). The winner represents her country at Miss Universe pageant. In 2017 the Miss Universe license in Ireland had given to Brittany Mason (an american model and Moxie media productions). The pageant reruns as like as the motto "Deliver the title of Miss Universe to the Irish". On occasion, when the winner does not qualify (due to age) for either contest, a runner-up is sent.

Year	County	Miss Universe Ireland	Placement at Miss Universe	Special Award(s)	Notes
Bren Marc Scully directorship — a franchise holder to Miss Universe from 2023
2026	Limerick	Aideen Howard	TBA		
2025	Galway	Aadya Srivastava	Unplaced		
2024	Cork	Sofia Labus	Unplaced		
2023	Kildare	Aishah Akorede	Unplaced		
Brittany Mason directorship — a franchise holder to Miss Universe between 2017―2021
Did not compete in 2022
2021	Belfast	Katharine Walker	Unplaced		Appointed — Due to the impact of COVID-19 pandemic, the Runner-up of Miss Universe Ireland 2020 crowned as the Miss Universe Ireland 2021.
2020	Ulster	Nadia Sayers	Unplaced		
2019	Dublin	Fionnghuala O'Reilly	Unplaced		
2018	Donegal	Grainne Gallanagh	Top 20		
2017	Cork	Cailín Toibín	Top 16		
Andrea Roche directorship — a franchise holder to Miss Universe between 2002―2015
Did not compete in 2016
2015	Derry	Joanna Cooper	Unplaced		
2014	Cork	Lisa Madden	Unplaced		
Did not compete in 2013
2012	Dublin	Adrienne Murphy	Unplaced		
2011	Limerick	Aoife Hannon	Unplaced		
2010	Tipperary	Rozanna Purcell	Top 10		
2009	Dublin	Diana Donnelly	Unplaced		
2008	Dublin	Lynn Kelly	Unplaced		
Did not compete in 2007
2006	Galway	Melanie Boreham	Unplaced		
2005	Dublin	Mary Gormley	Unplaced		
2004	Louth	Cathriona Duignam	Unplaced		
2003	Limerick	Lesley Flood	Unplaced		
2002	South Dublin	Lisa O'Sullivan	Unplaced		

=== Miss Ireland 1961-2001 ===
- : Declared as Winner
- : Ended as runner-up or top 5/6 qualification
- : Ended as one of the finalists or semifinalists
- : Ended as special awards winner

Year	County	Miss Ireland	Placement at Miss Universe	Special Award(s)	Notes
Kieran Murray and Roisin MC Queenie directorship — a franchise holder to Miss Universe between 1997―2001
2001	Tipperary	Lesley Turner	Unplaced		Miss Universe Ireland 2001 (separate title).
2000	Tipperary	Louise Doheny	Unplaced		Miss Universe Ireland 2000 (separate title).
1999	Dublin	Vivienne Doyle	Unplaced		
1998	Tipperary	Andrea Roche	Top 10		
1997	Limerick	Fiona Mullally	Unplaced		Appointed — The 3rd Runner-up of Miss Ireland 1996 competed at Miss Universe 1997.
Krish Naidoo directorship — a franchise holder to Miss Universe between 1980―1996
1996	Cavan	Joanne Black	Unplaced		
1995	Dublin	Anna Maria McCarthy	Unplaced		
1994	South Dublin	Pamela Flood	Unplaced		
1993	Cork	Sharon Ellis	Unplaced		
1992	Down	Jane Thompson	Unplaced		Designated as "Miss Universe Ireland 1992" after Miss Ireland 1991 Amanda Bunker did not allow to compete, due to minimum requirement.
1991	Fingal	Siobhan McClafferty	Unplaced	Miss Photogenic	
1990	South Dublin	Barbara Ann Curran	Unplaced		
1989	Dublin	Collette Jackson	Unplaced		
1988	Dublin	Adrienne Rock	Unplaced		
1987	Down	Rosemary Elizabeth Thompson	Unplaced		
1986	—	Karen Ann Shevlin	Unplaced		Designated as "Miss Universe Ireland 1986" after Miss Ireland 1985, Anne Marie Gannon, did not go to Miss Universe 1986.
1985	Dublin	Olivia Marie Tracey	Top 10		
1984	Dublin	Patricia Nolan	Unplaced		
1983	Londonderry	Roberta Brown	2nd Runner-up		
1982	Londonderry	Geraldine Mary McGrory	Unplaced		
1981	Dublin	Valerie Roe	Unplaced		Miss Ireland 1980 (there were two titles in Miss Ireland; Miss Ireland Universe and Miss Ireland World).
1980	Dublin	Maura McMenamim	Unplaced		Miss Ireland 1979 (there were two titles in Miss Ireland; Miss Ireland Universe and Miss Ireland World).
Eric Morley directorship — a franchise holder to Miss Universe between 1961―1979
1979	—	Lorraine Marion O’Connor	Unplaced		
1978	Dublin	Lorraine Bernadette Enriquez	Top 12		
1977	Dublin	Jakki Moore	Unplaced		
1976	Westmeath	Elaine Rosemary O’Hara	Unplaced		
1975	Dublin	Julie Ann Farnham	Top 12		
1974	Dublin	Yvonne Costelloe	Unplaced		
1973	—	Pauline Theresa Fitzsimons	Unplaced		
1972	Donegal	Maree McGlinchey	Unplaced		
1971	—	Marie Hughes	Unplaced		
1970	Fermanagh	Rita Doherty	Unplaced		
1969	—	Patricia Brine	Unplaced		
1968	Dublin	Tiffany Scales	Unplaced		
1967	—	Patricia Armstrong	Top 15		
1966	Cavan	Gladys Anne Waller	Unplaced		
1965	—	Anne Elizabeth Neill	Unplaced		
1964	—	Maurine Elizabeth Lecky	Unplaced		
1963	—	Marlene Margaret McKeown	2nd Runner-up	Miss Photogenic	Crowned from the title of Miss Ireland-Nations 1963/1964.
1962	Dublin	Josie Dwyer	Unplaced		
1961	Dublin	Jean Russell	Unplaced		
