= Britain & Ireland's Next Top Model series 8 =

Britain & Ireland's Next Top Model
- Season 8
- Judges: Elle Macpherson; Tyson Beckford; Julien Macdonald; Whitney Port
- No. of contestants: 14
- Winner: Letitia Herod
- No. of episodes: 13

Release
- Original network: Sky Living
- Original release: 9 July – 1 October 2012

Season chronology
- ← Previous; Cycle 7 Next → Cycle 9

The eighth cycle of Britain & Ireland's Next Top Model premiered on 9 July 2012 on Sky Living. Two judges from the previous cycle did not retain their positions. Elle Macpherson continued as the show's head judge along with designer Julien Macdonald, but model-actor Charley Speed and stylist Grace Woodward were replaced by designer Whitney Port, and male supermodel Tyson Beckford, who was previously a host on Bravo's Make Me a Supermodel from 2008 to 2009.

Cycle 8 auditions began on Monday 14 November in Dublin, Ireland, and wrapped up in Newcastle on Thursday 1 December. The filming of the show wrapped up in April 2012.

The prizes for this cycle included a modelling contract with Models 1, a fashion spread and cover feature in Company magazine, a contract with Revlon cosmetics, an international fashion campaign for Miss Selfridge, trip to Atlantis, The Palm in Dubai courtesy of Destinology, and an apartment at 51 Buckingham Gate.

The winner of the competition was 18-year-old Letitia Herod from Oxshott, Surrey.

== Cast ==
=== Contestants ===
(Ages stated are at start of contest)

Contestant	Age	Height	Hometown	Finish	Place
Amelia Raven	18	1.80 m (5 ft 11 in)	Leicester, England	Episode 2	14 (quit)
Emma Sharratt	18	1.77 m (5 ft 9 1/2 in)	Newcastle upon Tyne, England	Episode 3	13
Penelope Williamson	19	1.75 m (5 ft 9 in)	Leeds, England	Episode 4	12
Tasmin Golding	21	1.82 m (5 ft 11 1/2 in)	London, England	Episode 5	11
Anne Winterburn	23	1.79 m (5 ft 10 1/2 in)	Bedfordshire, England	Episode 6	10
Kellie Forde	21	1.79 m (5 ft 10 1/2 in)	Cork, Ireland	Episode 7	9
Jennifer Joint	19	1.78 m (5 ft 10 in)	Hampshire, England	Episode 8	8
Madeleine Taga	20	1.82 m (5 ft 11 1/2 in)	London, England	Episode 9	7
Roxanne O'Connor	22	1.75 m (5 ft 9 in)	London, England	Episode 10	6
Risikat Oyebade	22	1.75 m (5 ft 9 in)	London, England	Episode 11	5
Lisa Madden	18	1.75 m (5 ft 9 in)	Cork, Ireland	Episode 12	4
Anita Kaushik	20	1.75 m (5 ft 9 in)	Southampton, England	Episode 13	3
Emma Grattidge	19	1.73 m (5 ft 8 in)	Swansea, Wales	Episode 13	2
Letitia Herod	18	1.74 m (5 ft 8 1/2 in)	Oxshott, England	Episode 13	1

=== Judges ===
- Elle Macpherson (host)
- Tyson Beckford
- Julien Macdonald
- Whitney Port

== Episodes ==
No. overall	No. in season	Title	Original release date	UK viewers (millions)
83	1	"Episode 1"	9 July 2012	0.48 (480,000) (Note: Episode viewing figures from BARB)
The 20 contestants converged at the St. Pancras Renaissance hotel in London for casting week, and had a runway interview challenge with host Elle Macpherson at a separate location. The models were then flown to Dubai, and moved into the Atlantis hotel for the duration of their stay in the United Arab Emirates. Two of the semi-finalists decided to drop out of the competition, and the remaining contestants were split into groups in a swimwear photo shoot for which one of them was later eliminated.: Special Guests: Melissa Burton; Featured Photographer: Maz
84	2	"Episode 2"	16 July 2012	0.47 (472,000)
The remaining 17 contestants met with the judges for one on one interviews, and were scheduled to have a photo shoot with camels in the desert that had to be canceled due to a sandstorm. They instead had a group photo shoot at the hotel where they posed as Arabian brides. The judges deliberated later that night, and the top 14 contestants were chosen. At the end of the episode, it was revealed that Amelia had decided to quit the competition.: Featured Photographer: Maz
85	3	"Episode 3"	23 July 2012	0.39 (392,000)
The 13 contestants moved into the model house, and had a housewarming party where they were visited by cycle 7 winner Jade Thompson. They later had a runway training challenge working with a variety of animals at the Chessington World of Adventures theme park and zoo, where Risikat was chosen as the best performer. The contestants also had a photo shoot at Malcolm Ryan Studios for the custom made footwear label, Shoes of Prey, where they had to pose in pairs while they were suspended in the air as butterflies. As the winner of the challenge Risikat was allowed to pose alone. At elimination singer Alesha Dixon was introduced as the week's guest judge, and Anne received picture of the week. Emma Sharratt and Tasmin landed in the bottom two, and Emma was eliminated from the competition.: Featured Photographer: John Rowley; Special Guests: Jade Thompson, Matt Henry, Bip Ling, Jodie Fox, Alesha Dixon
86	4	"Episode 4"	30 July 2012	0.33 (330,000)
The remaining 12 contestants received makeovers at the Daniel Galvin salon, and also had their teeth whitened before being treated to a day out at a skating disco. They later met singer Mollie King for their photo shoot, where they were taken to a correctional facility to shoot an advertising campaign for Baby-G watches. Kimberly Wyatt was introduced as the week's guest judge at panel, where Roxanne received picture of the week. Penelope and Tasmin landed in the bottom two, and Penelope was eliminated from the competition.: Featured photographer: Joseph Sinclair; Special guests: James Galvin, Mervyn Druian, Mollie King, Sarah Salter, Kimberly Wyatt
87	5	"Episode 5"	6 August 2012	0.34 (347,000)
The contestants were taken to the Hurlingham Academy, and met image consultant Vernon Francois for a challenge in which they had to decorate t-shirts and talk about their insecurities in a motivational speech for the school's students. Due to the good performances across the board, all the models were treated to a night out. The contestants later had a gender-bending photo shoot at a gentlemen's club in which they were styled as men. Model Andreja Pejić was introduced as the week's guest judge at panel, where Roxanne and Emma both received picture of the week. Anne and Tasmin landed in the bottom two, and Tasmin was eliminated from the competition.: Featured Photographer: Alex James; Special Guests: Vernon Francois, Aled Jones, Andreja Pejić
88	6	"Episode 6"	13 August 2012	0.32 (327,000)
The contestants had to shoot a mock commercial for Alcatel, where they had to pretend to be talking to their lover over the phone with a script written in French. As the winner of the challenge, Letitia was allowed to steal five minutes from one of the models during the upcoming shoot, which she chose to take from Anne. The models were then flown to Paris, and met cycle 6 contestant Joy McLaren, who was also on set during their photo shoot with a male model at Champ de Mars for Impulse body spray. Melanie Brown was introduced as the week's guest judge at panel, where Anita received picture of the week. Anne and Emma landed in the bottom two, and Anne was eliminated from the competition.: Featured photographer: Lionel Deluy; Special guests: Ludovic Leray, Joy McLaren, Laura Grant, Melanie Brown
89	7	"Episode 7"	20 August 2012	0.30 (304,000)
The contestants met TV presenter Laura Whitmore for a posing challenge in Carnaby Street under the pouring rain while passersby voted on their favorite contestants. Emma received the most votes and was chosen as the challenge winner. She received a shopping spree in Carnaby Street and was allowed to take Letitia with her. The contestants later had a go-see challenge with designer Hasan Hejazi in which they had to assess each others' performances. Lisa was voted as the best performer by the other contestants, while Hejazi chose Letitia as his favorite. On set, the girls had a color splash photo shoot with the members of the British hip hop duo Rizzle Kicks for a six-page editorial in Company magazine. Tali Lennox joined the panel as the week's guest judge, and Lisa received picture of the week. Kellie and Madeleine landed in the bottom two, and Kellie was eliminated from the competition.: Featured photographer: Diana Gomez; Special guests: Laura Whitmore, Hasan Hejazi, Victoria White, Rizzle Kicks, Tali Lennox
90	8	"Episode 8"	27 August 2012	0.30 (302,000)
The remaining contestants had a catwalk challenge for TRESemmé, where they had to walk on a plexiglas runway covered in water. Lisa was chosen as the best performer, winning a years worth of TRESemmé products and hair services at the Daniel Galvin salon. The contestants later had a photo shoot for Perfectcare at a vintage laundrette, where they had to pose with a group of nude male models whilst wearing the same couture gown. Paul Sculfor served as the week's guest judge at panel, where Emma received picture of the week. Jennifer and Madeleine landed in the bottom two, and Jennifer was eliminated from the competition.: Featured photographer: Alex James; Special guests: James Galvin, Annabel Granger, Terry Hart, Stooshe, Paul Sculfor, Gemma McHenry
91	9	"Episode 9"	3 September 2012	0.35 (357,000)
The contestants met journalist Gordon Smart, and had a press challenge where they had to write a 60-second skit regarding their opinions of the other contestants, which they later had to present in front of the camera. Risikat was chosen as the best performer, and won an exclusive one-on-one visit from host Elle Macpherson. On set, the girls had a photo shoot with photographer Nicky Johnston in which they had to pose as broken Victorian dolls. Supermodel Erin O'Connor was introduced as the week's guest judge at panel, where Risikat received picture of the week. Madeleine and Roxanne landed in the bottom two, and Madeleine was eliminated from the competition.: Featured photographer: Nicky Johnston; Special guests: Gordon Smart, Erin O'Connor
92	10	"Episode 10"	10 September 2012	0.40 (403,000)
Letitia, Lisa, and Roxanne received a second set of makeovers. The contestants had a meeting with Elle at Hyde Park, where they learned that the remaining five contestants at the end of the week would be travelling to Canada for the remainder of the competition. The contestants had two photo shoots this week. The first was a session at Holborn Studios in which they had to pose with tarantulas, and the second was a beauty campaign at a manor house celebrating Revlon's 80th anniversary, where the contestants had to channel a modern interpretation of Marie Antoinette. At elimination, model Poppy Delevingne was introduced as the week's guest judge, and Lisa received picture of the week. Letitia and Roxanne landed in the bottom two, and Roxanne was eliminated from the competition.: Featured photographers: Clara Maidment, Seb Winter; Special guests: Sally Handler, Carly O'Connor, Poppy Delevingne
93	11	"Episode 11"	17 September 2012	N/A
The remaining five contestants were flown to Toronto, where they were taken to the CN Tower's EdgeWalk before moving into their home at the SoHo Metropolitan Hotel. They later had a go-sees challenge with Elite Model Management and Fashion magazine, where Risikat was chosen as the best performer, winning a rack of clothing from Pink Tartan. The following day the contestants were driven to Niagara Falls, and had a photo shoot for Miss Selfridge's Autumn/Winter campaign. America's Next Top Model panelist Nigel Barker was introduced as the week's guest judge during elimination, where Anita received picture of the week. Lisa and Risikat landed in the bottom two, and Risikat was eliminated from the competition.: Featured photographer: Gabor Jurina, Chris Nicholls; Special guests: David Kelley, Matti Gidilevich, Alecia Bell, Bernadette Morra, Yasmin Yusuf, Nigel Barker
94	12	"Episode 12"	24 September 2012	N/A
The contestants met fashion journalist Jeanne Beker at Yorkville for an interview challenge meant to test their knowledge of fashion. They later had to reverse the roles and interview passersby who they thought exemplified a good taste in fashion. As the winner of the challenge, Lisa was treated to a night out with actress Shenae Grimes, and was allowed to bring Emma along with her. The following morning the models were driven to Lake Muskoka, where they had a photo shoot for international accessories and footwear brand, Call It Spring. Kelly Cutrone was introduced as the week's guest judge at panel, where Anita received picture of the week. Letitia and Lisa landed in the bottom two, and Lisa was eliminated from the competition, leaving Anita, Emma, and Letitia as the top three contestants.: Featured photographer: Francisco Garcia; Special guests: Jeanne Beker, Shenae Grimes, Kelly Cutrone
95	13	"Episode 13"	1 October 2012	N/A
The top three were taken to the Scarborough Bluffs, and had a photo shoot on the beach where they had to pose with a horse as Native American princesses for which Anita was later eliminated. The remaining two contestants, Emma and Letitia, had a final runway show at The Carlu showcasing designs by Mikael Derderian and Gianni Falcone Pavoni. At the end of the night the judges deliberated over each finalists' work and progress throughout the competition, and Letitia was crowned as the winner.: Special guests: Hans Koechling, Warren Leacock, Mikael Derderian, Gianni Falcone Pavoni, Jeffery O'brecht; Featured photographer: Gabor Jurina

== Result ==
Order	Episode												
Order	2	3	4	5	6	7	8	9	10	11	12	13	
1	Emma G.	Anne	Roxanne	Emma G. Roxanne	Anita	Lisa	Emma G.	Risikat	Lisa	Anita	Anita	Emma G.	Letitia
2	Jennifer	Lisa	Emma G.	Emma G. Roxanne	Lisa	Roxanne	Anita	Anita	Anita	Emma G.	Emma G.	Letitia	Emma G.
3	Letitia	Roxanne	Letitia	Letitia	Letitia	Jennifer	Lisa	Emma G.	Risikat	Letitia	Letitia	Anita	
4	Kellie	Letitia	Lisa	Lisa	Risikat	Risikat	Roxanne	Letitia	Emma G.	Lisa	Lisa		
5	Amelia	Kellie	Risikat	Jennifer	Kellie	Anita	Letitia	Lisa	Letitia	Risikat			
6	Tasmin	Anita	Anne	Anita	Jennifer	Letitia	Risikat	Roxanne	Roxanne				
7	Lisa	Emma G.	Anita	Madeleine	Madeleine	Emma G.	Madeleine	Madeleine					
8	Roxanne	Risikat	Madeleine	Kellie	Roxanne	Madeleine	Jennifer						
9	Anne	Madeleine	Kellie	Risikat	Emma G.	Kellie							
10	Madeleine	Jennifer	Jennifer	Anne	Anne								
11	Anita	Penelope	Tasmin	Tasmin									
12	Emma S.	Tasmin	Penelope										
13	Penelope	Emma S.											
14	Risikat												

The contestant quit the competition
The contestant was eliminated
The contestant won the competition.

=== Bottom two ===
Episode	Contestants	Eliminated
3	Emma S. & Tasmin	Emma S.
4	Penelope & Tasmin	Penelope
5	Anne & Tasmin	Tasmin
6	Anne & Emma G.	Anne
7	Kellie & Madeleine	Kellie
8	Jennifer & Madeleine	Jennifer
9	Madeleine & Roxanne	Madeleine
10	Letitia & Roxanne	Roxanne
11	Lisa & Risikat	Risikat
12	Letitia & Lisa	Lisa
13	Anita & Letitia	Anita
13	Emma G. & Letitia	Emma G.

The contestant was eliminated after her first time in the bottom two
The contestant was eliminated after her second time in the bottom two
The contestant was eliminated after her third time in the bottom two
The contestant was eliminated in the final judging and placed as the runner-up

=== Average call-out order ===
Final two is not included.

Rank by average	Place	Model	Call-out total	Number of call-outs	Call-out average
1	4	Lisa	30	10	3.00
2	3	Anita	36	11	3.27
3	2	Emma G.	39	11	3.55
4	1	Letitia	41	11	3.73
5	6	Roxanne	31	8	3.88
6	5	Risikat	45	9	5.00
7	10	Anne	27	4	6.75
8	8	Jennifer	42	6	7.00
9	9	Kellie	36	5	7.20
10	7	Madeleine	53	7	7.57
11	11	Tasmin	34	3	11.33
12	12	Penelope	23	2	11.50
13	13	Emma S.	13	1	13.00
