= Rozanna Purcell =

Irish beauty pageant titleholder

- Born: Rozanna Purcell; 3 September 1990 (age 36); Clonmel, County Tipperary, Ireland
- Height: 5 ft 11 in (1.80 m)
- Beauty pageant titleholder
- Title: Miss Universe Ireland 2010
- Hair colour: Light brown
- Eye colour: Blue
- Major competitions: Miss Universe Ireland 2009 (1st Runner-Up); Miss Universe Ireland 2010 (Winner); Miss Universe 2010 (Top 10)

Rozanna "Roz" Purcell (born 3 September 1990) is an Irish model, charity worker, radio presenter, author and beauty pageant titleholder who won Miss Universe Ireland 2010 and represented Ireland at Miss Universe 2010.

== Miss Universe ==
Purcell competed in Miss Universe Ireland 2009 and competed in Miss Universe 2010.

== After Miss Universe ==
Purcell was offered a contract with Trump Model Management after the Miss Universe 2010 competition ended, and was offered additional contracts in Mexico and Colombia. She was then invited to judge at the Miss Venezuela 2010 pageant. She later joined her mentor Andrea Roche's modelling agency in Ireland.

An experienced hiker, she has talked of her difficulties at temperatures of minus 25C on Kilimanjaro.

She was a judge at Miss Universe Ireland 2012.

In October 2013, she started her own food blog, naturalbornfeeder.com. and published her first cookbook Natural Born Feeder in January 2016.

Her book The Hike Life: My 50 Favourite Hikes in Ireland was published in 2023 and named Lifestyle Book of the Year, as one of the 2023 Irish Book Awards. In 2024 her book The Hike Life: 50 More to Explore was published and was shortlisted for the Irish Book Awards.

== Television and Radio work ==
Purcell won Come Dine With Me on TV3 in 2012.

She participated in Celebrity Bainisteoir on RTÉ in 2012. She managed Newtown Cashel, in Longford.

She has modelled extensively for Newbridge Silverware and is one of the faces of Newbridge Silverware.

In February 2015 she appeared as the guest Celebrity Chef on TV3's The Restaurant.

In 2021, Purcell joined the judging panel of recycled fashion programme Junk Kouture alongside esteemed talent manager Louis Walsh and star of RuPaul's Drag Race, Michelle Visage.

Since February 2025, Purcell has hosted the breakfast show on 2FM alongside Carl Mullan and Aisling Bonner.

== Charity work ==
Purcell has also helped to raise awareness and funds for the Irish Cancer Society's 'Get Active For 2015' campaign.

== Personal life ==
Purcell has been in a relationship with Zach Desmond since 2016, and they married in a ceremony at Dublin City Hall in March 2026 .

Awards and achievements
Preceded by Diana Donnelly	Miss Universe Ireland; 2010	Succeeded by Aoife Hannon
