= Clondalkin Round Tower =

- Cloigtheach Dolcáin (Irish)
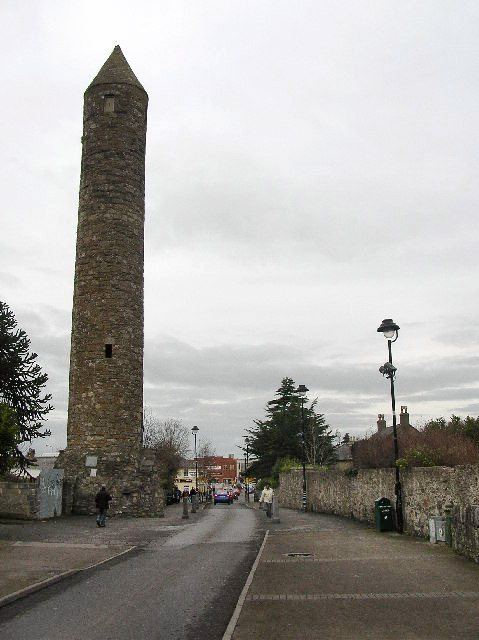

- Location within Dublin
- 53.322065°N 6.395374°W
- Type: Irish round tower
- Location: Tower Road, Clondalkin, County Dublin, Ireland

History
- Built: 8th–9th century

Site notes
- Height: 25.6 m (84 ft)

National monument of Ireland
- Official name: Clondalkin
- Reference no.: 32

Clondalkin Round Tower (Irish: Cloigtheach Chluain Dolcáin) is an Irish round tower located in Clondalkin, County Dublin, Ireland. Located on the site of a monastery founded by Saint Mochua (also known as Saint Cronan), the tower is protected as a national monument. As of December 2024, the tower's visitor centre was reportedly closed 'until further notice'.

== Location ==
Clondalkin Round Tower is located in central Clondalkin, South Dublin, south of the River Camac. It was built on the site of a monastery which had been founded by Saint Mochua/Cronan in the 7th century.

== History ==
Clondalkin Round Tower, dating from the 8th or 9th century, is one of only four remaining in County Dublin, the others being located in Swords, Lusk and Rathmichael. It stands over 25.6 m (84 ft) high and is thought to be an early example as the granite on the lintels is flat.

The Viking King Olaf the White built a fort in the area in AD 852. The monastery was plundered in AD 832 and AD 865.

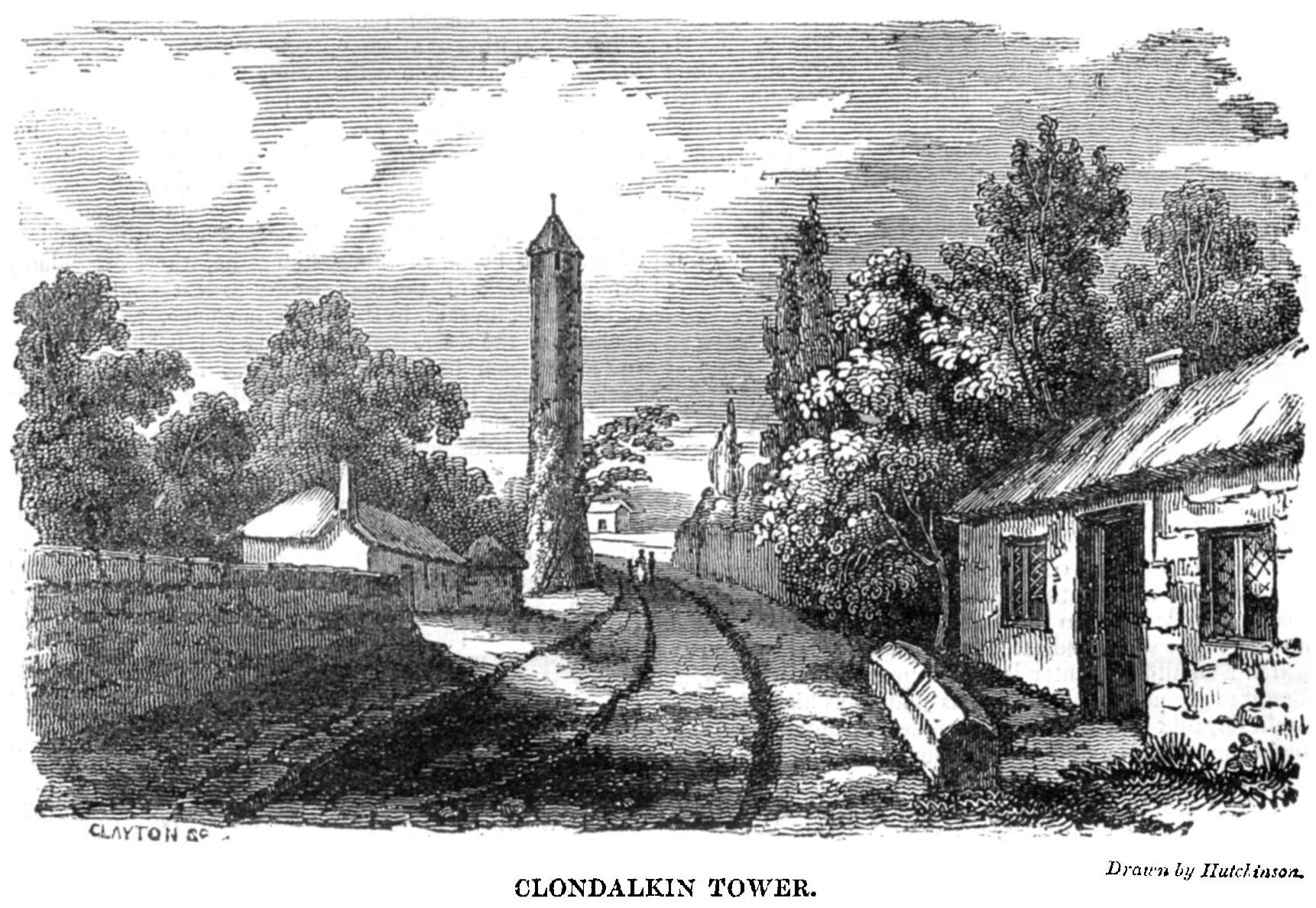
1833, Dublin Penny Journal

Amlaíb Conung (d. 874) built a fortress on the site in the middle of the 9th century. In 867, a force led by Cennétig mac Gaíthéne, king of Loígis, burned the fortress at Clondalkin and killed approximately 100 of Amlaíb's followers. The district remained under Danish control until the Viking defeat by Brian Boru at the Battle of Clontarf in 1014. Clondalkin witnessed another historic event during the Norman invasion of Ireland when there was a battle there between Richard de Clare (Strongbow) and the High King of Ireland Ruaidrí Ua Conchobair.

The tower is now the site of a museum and visitor centre, and there is also a café on the site.

== Description ==
Built on the site of a monastery founded by Saint Mochua in the 7th century AD, the round tower at Clondalkin is one of four remaining towers in County Dublin. The Clondalkin tower, which was built in the late 8th or early 9th century, stands at 25.6 m (84 ft) high. Because the stones used in construction are of a rough undressed variety of local calp limestone, it is thought to be an early round tower. The drum is also extremely narrow, the diameter being only 4.04 m (13.3 ft) meters at its widest point. An unusual feature of this tower is the pronounced buttress at its base. This buttress is constructed of a different variety of stone to the main tower, and was likely added at a later date.

A series of steps were cut into the buttress in the late 19th century. These wind around the buttress leading up 3.9 m (13 ft) to the base of the east facing doorway. Granite stones were used for the jambs, sill and lintel of the doorway. There are 6 windows in the tower, and the top 4 of them point north, south, east and west.

The bulging base is rubble work with smaller stones. The doorway, 3.9 m (13 ft) above pavement level, faces east toward St. John's Church. The plain lintelled doorway is composed mainly of granite. There are four square-headed windows in the top story facing the cardinal compass points. Two other windows in the drum face south (in the first story) and west (in the second story). Both are also square-headed.

=== Crosses ===
There are two stone crosses on the site. The smaller depicts both a ringed and a Latin cross on its faces, while the larger granite cross, which may have originally been a boundary or grave marker, stands proudly a few meters apart from the smaller cross.

Along the boundary to the right of the nearby church is a large granite baptismal font. Together with the two early crosses, this font may also be a remnant of the original monastery.
