= Lynn Kelly =

New Zealand jewellery designer (born 1957)

- Born: 1957 (age 68–69); Wellington
- Occupation: Jewellery designer

Lynn Kelly (born 1957) is a New Zealand jewellery designer. Her work is in the permanent collection of Museum of New Zealand Te Papa Tongarewa, the Dowse Art Museum and Auckland War Memorial Museum.

== Early life and family ==
Kelly was born in the Wellington suburb of Tawa, the daughter of Jim Kelly, a geriatric specialist, and Evelyn Kelly, a noted ceramic artist. The family moved to Whanganui, which helped to nurture Kelly's love of nature. She originally worked as a gardener, and studied for a certificate in craft design at Wanganui Regional Community College when she worked for the college's groundskeeping team.

== Career ==
Kelly began making jewellery in 1988 using precious metals, organic materials and sometimes fossilised plants. Her work is distinctive for recreating the forms of ferns, seed pods and flowers in metals.

In 2004, Kelly won the Molly Morpeth Canaday Wear Aotearoa Award. She had work represented in the 2nd, 3rd and 4th Jewellery Biennale exhibitions, and in 2007 she won the Dowse Foundation Gold Award. In 2012, Kelly received a Wild Creations residency from Creative New Zealand and the Department of Conservation. In 2014 she was artist-in-residence for Auckland City Council at Scandrett Regional Park.
