= Agnes Brown =

Agnes Brown(e) or Broun may refer to:

- Agnes Brown (17th century), alleged witch of Guilsborough, England
- Agnes Broun (1732–1820), mother of Robert Burns
- Agnes Brown (19th century), early business owner in Walnut Grove, California
- Agnes Brown (suffragist) (1866–1943), Scottish suffragist and writer
- Agnes Browne, a 1999 Irish film
- Agnes Brown (Mrs. Brown's Boys), a fictional character in Mrs. Brown's Boys
