= Gary Hollywood =

Scottish actor

- Born: Gary Michael Hollywood; 2 September 1979 (age 46); Pollok, Glasgow, Scotland
- Education: St Robert Bellarmine Secondary School
- Occupation: Actor
- Years active: 1993-present
- Notable work: Mrs. Brown's Boys (2011–2020); All Round to Mrs Brown's (2017–2020)
- Television: Taggart; Take the High Road
- Spouse(s): Sharon Mudie (2003-2017); Cherylanne Hollywood (2019-present)
- Children: 4

Gary Michael Hollywood (born 2 September 1979) is a Scottish actor who is best known for his role as Dino Doyle in the BAFTA-winning show Mrs. Brown's Boys and for playing Dominic Dunbar in Scottish soap opera Take the High Road.

== Biography ==
Hollywood was born and raised in Glasgow, where he attended St. Robert Bellarmine Secondary School.

When he was 12, his drama teachers sent him to audition for a starring guest role in the Scottish Television police drama Taggart alongside 34 other competitors. He was successful in his audition and landed the part of Simon Barrow in the episode Gingerbread.

He went on to play Henry in Doctor Finlay. Hollywood has worked in television since his first appearance in Taggart in 1993 and starred in the STV soap opera Take the High Road between 1995 and 2002. He completed his first American film, playing the title role in Lawrence R. Hott's biopic about the Scots-born founder of Yosemite National Park, The Boyhood Of John Muir (1998). His film credits also include The Winter Guest, where he played alongside Oscar-winning actress Emma Thompson, directed by Alan Rickman, and The Flying Scotsman with Jonny Lee Miller and Brian Cox. He also played alongside Conor McCarron in the feature film Neds as PC Muir, directed by Peter Mullan.

He has worked extensively in theatre, film, and television. It was whilst doing pantomime in Glasgow in 2000 that he met Brendan O'Carroll who asked him to work for him in his production company and tour with his theatre show Mrs. Brown's Boys which has since transferred to television on BBC One and has become a multi award-winning show. In October 2020 after over 20 years, Hollywood and fellow actor Damien McKiernan quit the show after a dispute, and their characters were retired from the show.

== Personal life ==
He was married to Sharon Mudie from 2003 to 2017, and they have two children. Hollywood then married Cherylanne in 2019; they have 2 sons, his wife suffered a miscarriage at 12 weeks in 2023.

== Filmography ==
| Year | Film | Role | Notes |
|---|---|---|---|
| 1993 | Taggart | Simon Barrow | Episode: Gingerbread |
| 1995 | Doctor Finlay | Henry | Episode: Old Flames |
| 1995–2003 | Take the High Road | Dominic Dumbar/Ramsay | |
| 1997 | The Winter Guest | Alex | |
| 1998 | The Boyhood Of John Muir | John Muir | |
| 2004–2008 | Mrs Brown's Boys: Original Series | Dino Doyle | |
| 2006 | The Flying Scotsman | Cycle Courier | |
| 2010 | Neds | PC Muir | |
| 2011–2020 | Mrs. Brown's Boys | Dino Doyle | BBC One |
| 2014 | Mrs. Brown's Boys D'Movie | Dino Doyle | Released in cinemas on 27 June 2014 |
| 2017–2020 | All Round to Mrs Brown's | Dino Doyle | Saturday Night Chat Show |
