= List of Mrs. Brown's Boys characters =

Scottish sitcom cast

Mrs. Brown's Boys is a sitcom produced by BBC Scotland in partnership with BocPix and RTÉ, written by and starring Brendan O'Carroll. Originally a radio series starting in 1992, the series became more and more popular, which led to the television series debut on 1 January 2011.

There was another DVD series which was not shown on television, prior to the current television series.

== The Brown Family ==
=== Agnes Brown ===
Agnes Brown
- Mrs. Brown's Boys character
- Portrayed by: Brendan O'Carroll
- Duration: 1990s–
- First appearance: 1990s (Radio Series); 2002–2008 (Original Series); 21 February 2011 (BBC Series)
- Introduced by: Brendan O'Carroll
In-universe information
- Occupation: Housewife; Market Stallholder
- Sisters: Dolly
- Husband: Redser Brown (1959–1990)
- Sons: Mark Brown; Dermot Brown; Rory Brown; Trevor Brown; Simon Brown (debatable); Frankie Brown (debatable)
- Daughters: Cathy Brown
- Grandsons: Bono Brown; John Brown; George Brown; Ringo Brown
- Aunts: Frances; Minnie; Niamh

Agnes Loretta Brown is the protagonist and the loud-mouth matriarch in the BBC comedy series Mrs. Brown's Boys and the host of the 2017 BBC entertainment show All Round to Mrs Brown's.

A mother of six children, widow of Redser and carer for Grandad, she is known for her no-nonsense, somewhat rude and colourful approach to the family and in the lives of her children and Grandad, dealing with everything that goes on without the blink of an eye. However karma seems to make up for her behaviour, making her the subject of jokes, pranks and mistakes that are a result of revenge, jealousy, or simply misfortune, causing much laughter to the audience and viewers. For Agnes, being nice is one of her weaknesses and she is very disorganised sometimes.

Agnes appears along with Cathy in the 2022 Netflix film A Madea Homecoming to attend the graduation party of her great-nephew Davi (whose grandfather was Redser's brother). The film's handling of the issue of Black Irish identity received positive press.

=== Grandad ===
Grandad
- Mrs. Brown's Boys character
- Portrayed by: Dermot O'Neill
- Duration: 1990s–
- First appearance: 1990s (Radio Series); 2004–2008 (Original Series); 21 February 2011 (BBC Series)
- Introduced by: Brendan O'Carroll
In-universe information
- Other names: The Man That God Forgot
- Occupation: Retired
- Brothers: Mickey Brown
- Sons: Redser Brown; Terry Brown
- Grandsons: Mark Brown; Dermot Brown; Rory Brown; Trevor Brown; Frankie Brown (debatable); Simon Brown (debatable)
- Granddaughters: Cathy Brown
- Nieces: Nellie Scully
- Other relatives: Bono Brown; John Brown; George Brown; Ringo Brown; Davi O'Malley

Harold Brown, better known as Grandad, is the father of the late Redser and father-in-law to Agnes.

In the episode "The Mammy" in 2011, Mrs Brown states Grandad is 92.

Grandad is fairly fit for his age, being able to walk without a stick and is seen very nearly running in one episode. He gets on well with the family; however, with Agnes, this is a different matter altogether. The two have a deep rivalry, and are sometimes, quite horrible and mean to each other, examples of which include Agnes forcing Grandad to sing a Western song and hitting him with a tray; Grandad trapping Agnes behind the Christmas tree; Agnes trying to get rid of Grandad for two weeks and Grandad referring to her as "The Twat".

Despite their animosity to each other, Agnes and Grandad have been shown to genuinely care for each other, even if they conceal it very well. On Valentine's Day, Grandad gave some flowers to Agnes and admitted that he thought his son was foolish for taking Agnes for granted. On another occasion, when Grandad was to go to the hospital for tests, Grandad admitted to Agnes that he was afraid, prompting Agnes to give him a pep talk to boost his spirits.

When the Brown children were growing up, Grandad played a small role in their lives. He would take them on a walk to the betting shop where he would spend the day. He still looks out for the children, but not as much. Bono enjoys playing with (or in his view, tormenting) him. Grandad has long white hair and is most often seen in his armchair, sleeping. In World War II, he was part of the bomb squad. His wife's name has not been mentioned.

Grandad also features in All Round to Mrs. Brown's where he is normally seen sleeping in his chair while Agnes and Cathy interview guests. He was absent from Series 4 because portrayer Dermot O'Neill was unable to attend filming while receiving treatment for cancer.

=== Mark Brown ===
Mark Brown
- Mrs. Brown's Boys character
- Portrayed by: Pat 'Pepsi' Shields
- Duration: 1990s–
- First appearance: 28 February 2011 (BBC Series)
- Introduced by: Brendan O'Carroll
In-universe information
- Occupation: Carpenter
- Father: Redser Brown
- Mother: Agnes Brown
- Brothers: Dermot Brown; Rory Brown; Trevor Brown; Frankie Brown (debatable); Simon Brown (debatable)
- Sisters: Cathy Brown
- Wife: Betty Brown (2004–2025)
- Sons: Bono Brown
- Grandfathers: Harold Brown
- Uncles: Terry Brown
- Aunts: Dolly
- Nephews: John Brown; George Brown; Ringo Brown

Mark Brown is the eldest Brown child, the husband to Betty and the father to Bono.

Mark became the head of the family aged twenty-six, when his father died suddenly. He is the quietest too, often being coaxed into things by his wife. He was born on his parents' wedding day; Agnes's waters broke just after the couple said 'I do'. He was offered a promotion at work, but turned it down. The result was that Betty kicked him out and he turned up at his mother's house, feeling depressed and tired. He turned down the job because, despite attending school for eight years and not even missing one single day, he did not learn to read or write. Agnes, feeling guilty, blamed herself until Cathy pointed out that if in eight years that he failed to learn, it was the teachers' fault. The problem is resolved when Betty says that she is determined to teach him.

Later on, there was no work going in the carpentry world, and Mark was made redundant. He and Betty had no choice other than to move from Finglas to Australia. Mark was reluctant to tell his mother, but Betty forced him to. Although putting on a brave face, Agnes was mortified, sitting silent for the rest of the day. When the visas for the three came through, Agnes found it even harder. However, Betty asked Cathy to print something at work for her; Cathy did so and soon, Mark found himself with more work than he could handle. The sheets that were photocopied turned out to be promotional leaflets, which Betty posted through some letterboxes. The family did not emigrate to Australia, and the couple let their son Bono – Agnes's favourite relative – break the good news. Mark would have moved to England if Trevor had stayed at the Brown Residence instead of going to Africa. In the 2025 series of the show, Mark has been wearing glasses.

In the 2025 Christmas special, it's revealed that Mark and Betty have split up.

=== Rory Brown ===
Rory Brown
- Mrs. Brown's Boys character
- Portrayed by: Rory Cowan (1990s–2017); Pat "Pepsi" Shields (2017 tour); Damien McKiernan (2017–2020)
- Duration: 1990–2020
- First appearance: 1990 (Radio Series); 2002–2008 (Original Series); 21 February 2011 (BBC Series)
- Last appearance: 1 January 2020
- Introduced by: Brendan O'Carroll
In-universe information
- Occupation: Hairdresser
- Father: Redser Brown
- Mother: Agnes Brown
- Brothers: Mark Brown; Dermot Brown; Trevor Brown; Frankie Brown (debatable); Simon Brown (debatable)
- Sisters: Cathy Brown
- Husband: Dino Doyle (2013–)
- Grandfathers: Harold Brown
- Uncles: Terry Brown
- Aunts: Dolly
- Nephews: Bono Brown; John Brown; George Brown; Ringo Brown
- Other relatives: Davi O'Malley

Rory Brown is the third son of the Brown family.

Rory is the only homosexual in the family, a fact acknowledged by all of his family members except his mother, who seemed completely oblivious to the fact until she realises this with Cathy's intervention in "Mammy of the Groom". Rory is not married until the end of Season 3, when he marries fellow hairdresser Dino Doyle in a private ceremony.

His sexuality is hinted at in "Mammy's Secret" when Rory tries to tell Agnes in Foley's; however, he is unable to do so. It is also hinted at later on in that episode when Agnes is having a discussion with Cathy and she says that Rory wants to tell her something, but is afraid that it will hurt her. This is also hinted at even more when the family is discussing who is coming to Dermot and Maria's wedding, when Rory said that he won't be bringing a girl. Rory was apparently caught wearing his sister's communion dress when he was about 10 years old.

Agnes is the only character not to know about his homosexuality up until "Mammy of the Groom" in which she describes it as an illness. Until then, she was completely unaware of this and even Agnes' best friend, Winnie McGoogan, knew that Rory was homosexual.

Rory is one of three of Agnes's children to wear glasses, the others being Trevor and Mark. By the time Rory left the show, Trevor was the only one to wear glasses until Mark did so from 2025.

Rory Cowan quit the role in July 2017 after 26 years of playing the character both on screen and in theatre, stating that he had not been happy for two years, although he did not state the reason for this.

It was announced that the character would be recast and the replacement would be revealed on the 2017 Christmas Day special. During the 2017 live tour for the November – December shows the role was played by Pat "Pepsi" Shields. Damien McKiernan was revealed to be the new Rory, making his first appearance during the 2017 Christmas Day special.

It was revealed in October 2020 that Rory had been written out of the programme after McKiernan and fellow actor Gary Hollywood quit the show following a pay dispute. Rory's absence from the 2020 Christmas special is explained by Agnes telling the viewers that he and Dino travelled to Wuhan to make their own brand of hairdryer and have not been able to get back home to Ireland. Rory and Dino haven't appeared on the show ever since and they do get mentioned sometimes on the show.

As of 2025, Rory is still in Wuhan according to Agnes.

=== Cathy Brown ===
Cathy Brown
- Mrs. Brown's Boys character
- Portrayed by: Jennifer Gibney
- Duration: 1990s–
- First appearance: 21 February 2011 (BBC Series)
- Introduced by: Brendan O'Carroll
In-universe information
- Occupation: Psychologist; Sales Representative; Celebrity Talk Show Host
- Father: Redser Brown
- Mother: Agnes Brown
- Brothers: Mark Brown; Dermot Brown; Rory Brown; Trevor Brown; Frankie Brown (debatable); Simon Brown (debatable)
- Husband: Unnamed (separated)
- Grandfathers: Harold Brown
- Uncles: Terry Brown
- Aunts: Dolly
- Nephews: Bono Brown; John Brown; George Brown; Ringo Brown
- Other relatives: Davi O'Malley

Catherine "Cathy" Brown is Agnes' only daughter in the Brown family.

She is a lonely middle-aged woman who is on the look-out for a man, but is put off by her mother and what her mother usually has to say about her boyfriends. In Series 1 it is revealed that Cathy had been married once in a London register office, and the man she married was beating her – she is not divorced as of Series 1. Her past romances include Teddy Brannigan, the local bad boy; Professor Thomas Clowne, her psychology teacher; and Mick, who is a police officer. It was revealed by Maria Brown that Mick was already married. It was revealed later in the series that Mick divorced his last wife, and they then get back together. Cathy claims that he's more sensitive. Later in the series, when Cathy is expecting a surprise romance holiday to Venice, Mick states that he is going to Cork for work. Cathy is automatically suspicious and decides to take a walk by the airport. When she discovers Mick is there with a young woman, she decides to "tip customs off that they are drug smugglers." In the New Year's Day 2015 episode, Cathy leaves for a fertility clinic in London in the hope of becoming pregnant.

Cathy also appears in All Round to Mrs Brown's in which she hosts a segment called "The Cathy Brown Show" where she and Agnes would interview celebrities.

The episode Orange Is The New Mammy states that Cathy's birthday is 6 July, but in 'Mammy's Memories?' Buster states her birthday is 29 February.

Cathy appears along with Agnes in the 2022 Netflix film A Madea Homecoming to attend Agnes' great-nephew Davi's graduation party.

Cathy is portrayed by O'Carroll's real-life wife Jennifer Gibney.

=== Dermot Brown ===
Dermot Brown
- Mrs. Brown's Boys character
- Portrayed by: Clyde Carroll (Original Series, 2002–2003); Paddy Houlihan (Original Series, 2004–2008), (2009 Pilot, BBC Series)
- Duration: 2011–
- First appearance: 21 February 2011 (BBC Series)
- Introduced by: Brendan O'Carroll
In-universe information
- Occupation: Promoter
- Father: Redser Brown
- Mother: Agnes Brown
- Brothers: Mark Brown; Rory Brown; Trevor Brown; Frankie Brown (debatable); Simon Brown (debatable)
- Sisters: Cathy Brown
- Wife: Maria Nicholson (2011–)
- Sons: John Brown; George Brown
- Grandfathers: Harold Brown
- Uncles: Terry Brown
- Aunts: Dolly
- Nephews: Bono Brown
- Other relatives: Davi O'Malley

Dermot Brown is the fourth child in the family and the child that causes his mother the most worry.

In his early years, he attended a private school recommended by a judge, and it is there that he met his lifelong friend Buster Brady. He later met and proposed to Maria Nicholson and the two married. Dermot gained a job as a promoter, a job which involves walking around the streets in various large and embarrassing costumes. Dermot and Maria had triplet sons, named after The Beatles: John, George and Ringo. Maria was initially against Dermot naming the children ("Your family doesn't have a great track record with names; you have a nephew named after a dog biscuit!"), but was soon swayed by his mostly normal names. The two love each other deeply, but Maria despises Buster, who regularly turns up with a criminal scam and tries to get Dermot involved.

Dermot is portrayed by Clyde Carroll in the original series and Paddy Houlihan (who originally played Trevor in the original series and a real-life friend of Danny O'Carroll) in the BBC series.

He is also married to Emily Regan, who plays the "Wash and Blow" trainee, Barbara and has two girls, who are twins.

=== Trevor Brown ===
Trevor Brown
- Mrs. Brown's Boys character
- Portrayed by: Paddy Houlihan (Original Series, 2002–2003); Martin Delany (BBC Series)
- Duration: 2011–
- First appearance: 26 December 2011 (BBC Series)
- Introduced by: Brendan O'Carroll
In-universe information
- Occupation: Missionary
- Father: Redser Brown
- Mother: Agnes Brown
- Brothers: Mark Brown; Dermot Brown; Rory Brown; Frankie Brown (debatable); Simon Brown (debatable)
- Sisters: Cathy Brown
- Grandfathers: Harold Brown
- Uncles: Terry Brown
- Aunts: Dolly
- Nephews: Bono Brown; John Brown; George Brown; Ringo Brown
- Other relatives: Davi O'Malley

Trevor Brown is the youngest child and the kindest of the Brown children.

Trevor was very nearly not home for one Christmas, despite spending 4 years on the missions, much to Agnes's dismay (everyone else knew). However, in the middle of the party, Trevor walks through the door and Agnes bursts into tears overjoyed. When he leaves for the missions in Series Two, he tells Agnes that he doesn't want a big fuss like last time, his exact words being "no cake, no decorations, no brass band and please, Mammy, no tears". Agnes disobeys him and orders everything. Another Christmas time, Agnes is reading the letters her children sent to Father Christmas, and reads Trevor's from the past. When he was a young boy, Trevor asked for his presents to be given to a poor boy with no toys.

Trevor has since appeared sporadically throughout the series. He appears for his brother Rory's wedding, and has a minor role in the movie, but is never a major character and all his traveling conflicts with his work on the missions. It was Father Quinn who helped Trevor get to the missions. He is very friendly with Quinn's replacement, Father Damien. When Agnes is trying to work out which of her children is gay, she rules out Trevor as he has taken a vow of celibacy.

Trevor also appears in All Round to Mrs Brown's where he along with Father Damien, hosts a segment called "Thought for the Day". In the second episode of Series 4, Trevor announced to Agnes that he wasn't returning to the missions after seeing what the world was like now and stated that if God had wanted him to stay, he would have given him a sign. Near the end of the episode, Trevor's faith was restored when he woke up and noticed "blood" markings on the palms of his hands, which he took as a sign from God. Unbeknownst to Trevor, Agnes had painted the markings on with red paint given to her by Betty.

Trevor is portrayed by O'Carroll's real-life ex-son-in-law, Martin Delany, and was the real-life husband of Fiona O'Carroll (Maria Brown) in the BBC series, they broke up in December 2021. Martin is also one of the producers of the series, working for O'Carroll's own production company BOC-PIX.

=== Betty Brown ===
Betty Brown
- Mrs. Brown's Boys character
- Portrayed by: Fionnuala Murphy (Original Series); Amanda Woods (BBC Series)
- Duration: 2011–2024
- First appearance: 21 February 2011 (BBC Series)
- Last appearance: 25 December 2024 (BBC Series)
- Introduced by: Brendan O'Carroll
In-universe information
- Occupation: Housewife
- Husband: Mark Brown
- Sons: Bono Brown

Elizabeth "Betty" Brown is Mark's wife, the daughter-in-law of Agnes and the mother of Bono.

Betty and Agnes have a love/hate relationship. Agnes likes her, but early on thinks that she is not good enough for Mark and is always willing to make a sly dig towards her. Betty has dyed blonde hair. Betty spends her nights at Foley's with Cathy, Maria, Agnes, and Winnie. Betty does not like snakes, even pythons.

When Mark, Betty, and Bono were thinking of moving to Australia, Betty was keener to move than her husband and son. She had already started packing before the visas arrived! However, upon seeing how much it would destroy Agnes if they did move, Betty wrote out some leaflets and asked Cathy to photocopy them at her workplace. Her idea worked, and soon Mark had more work than he could handle. Agnes and Betty have had a better relationship since then.

However much Agnes and Betty may dislike each other, they have bonded on one occasion. When Hilary Nicholson started slagging off the family, Betty stood up to her and told Agnes that the Browns would be a better family than the Nicholsons any day.

Betty was portrayed by O'Carroll's ex-real-life daughter-in-law, Amanda Woods, the ex-real-life wife of Danny O'Carroll (Buster Brady) and mother of Jamie O'Carroll (Bono Brown) and Blake O'Caroll (Blister Brady). Following Woods' separation from O'Carroll in 2024, Betty was written out of the series. She made her final appearance in the 2024 Christmas special, where she was seen leaving to take care of her mother. In the 2025 Christmas special, Mark confirmed that he and Betty had split up.

=== Bono Brown ===
Bono Brown
- Mrs. Brown's Boys character
- Portrayed by: Eric O'Carroll (Original Series); Jamie O'Carroll (BBC Series)
- Duration: 2012–
- First appearance: 4 February 2012 (BBC Series)
- Introduced by: Brendan O'Carroll
In-universe information
- Occupation: Schoolboy
- Father: Mark Brown
- Mother: Betty Brown
- Grandfathers: Redser Brown
- Grandmothers: Agnes Brown
- Uncles: Dermot Brown; Rory Brown; Trevor Brown; Frankie Brown (debatable); Simon Brown (debatable)
- Aunts: Cathy Brown
- First cousins: John Brown; George Brown; Ringo Brown
- Other relatives: Harold Brown (great-grandfather); Dolly (great-aunt); Davi O'Malley (first cousin twice removed)

Bono Brown is the only child of Mark and Betty and the first grandchild to Agnes. He was named after Bono, the lead singer of the Irish rock band U2.

Bono appears sporadically throughout the show. Agnes often babysits him, and he enjoys playing games with (or taunting) Grandad. He loves his Granny and tells her everything, which sometimes drops other family members into trouble.

In the 2018 New Year special CSI: Mammy, it is revealed that Bono is 12 years old. The 2019 New Year special Mammy's Motel covers Bono's 13th birthday.

Bono is portrayed by O'Carroll's real-life grandson Jamie O'Carroll, who is the real-life son of Amanda Woods (Betty Brown) and Danny O'Carroll (Buster Brady).

=== Maria Brown ===
Maria Brown
- Mrs. Brown's Boys character
- Portrayed by: Fiona O'Carroll
- Duration: 2011–
- First appearance: 21 February 2011 (BBC Series)
- Introduced by: Brendan O'Carroll
In-universe information
- Occupation: Nurse
- Father: Johnathan Nicholson
- Mother: Hilary Nicholson
- Husband: Dermot Brown (2011–)
- Sons: John Brown; George Brown; Ringo Brown
- Grandfathers: John Sheridan
- Aunts: Mary Sheridan
- First cousins: Bethany; Thomas Clowne
- Other relatives: James Nicholson

Maria Brown (née Nicholson) is the wife of Dermot and the mother of triplets John, George and Ringo Brown (named after the Beatles John Lennon, George Harrison and Ringo Starr respectively).

Maria comes from a wealthy family; her father, Johnathan, is a solicitor. Her mother, Hilary, is a snob and dislikes Agnes intensely. Maria loves the family though, and she and Dermot live with Agnes until they find their own place. Maria was more desperate to find a house than Dermot was, as she did not enjoy the cramped atmosphere. A nurse by profession, Maria spends her nights at Foley's with Agnes, Winnie, Cathy and Betty. She is not often seen with the triplets, so it is presumed that either Hilary or a paid babysitter watches them during the day.

Although several members of Maria's family have been mentioned throughout the series, none have actually appeared onscreen with the exception of her mother. Other family members include her cousin Bethany who, upon hearing that she was marrying Dermot, said "You aren't marrying that scumbag, are you?" but was bridesmaid at the wedding. Thomas Clowne, Cathy's former boyfriend, is a cousin of Maria's (as mentioned in the original series and live tour).

Maria is portrayed by O'Carroll's real-life daughter Fiona O'Carroll, the real-life wife of Martin Delany (Trevor Brown) until their separation in December 2021.

=== Dino Doyle ===
Dino Doyle
- Mrs. Brown's Boys character
- Portrayed by: Dermot Stanley (Original Series, 2002–2003); Gary Hollywood (Original Series, 2004–2008), (BBC Series, 2011–2020)
- Duration: 2011–2020
- First appearance: 28 February 2011 (BBC Series)
- Last appearance: 1 January 2020
- Introduced by: Brendan O'Carroll
In-universe information
- Occupation: Hairdresser
- Husband: Rory Brown (2013–)

Dino Doyle is the husband and fellow hairdresser of Rory Brown and the son-in-law of Agnes. He is from Scotland, and is portrayed by Gary Hollywood.

Dino and Rory work together at the Wash and Blow hair salon. Both are later promoted to co-managers of the salon. Dino was first introduced in The Last Wedding Part 1. Dino was a chef before a hairdresser which is why Rory recommended him in the first place. Agnes doesn't like Dino very much as, when he offered to use her new toilet to try to impress Hilary Nicholson, she saw that he was wearing a certain type of underwear (suspenders) that females wear. She then tells Rory that she thinks he is a "transtesticle" (transvestite).

In October 2020, after over 20 years working for O'Carroll, it was revealed that Gary Hollywood would be leaving the role after a pay dispute and finding out he would only be appearing in one of the programme's Christmas specials for that year. Dino's absence from the 2020 Christmas special is explained by Agnes telling viewers that he and Rory are stuck in Wuhan after travelling there to get their own brand of hairdryer made.

=== Redser Brown ===
Redser Brown
- Mrs. Brown's Boys character
- Portrayed by: Pat "Pepsi" Shields
- Duration: 1990s, 2021
- First appearance: 1990s
- Last appearance: 29 October 2021
- Introduced by: Brendan O'Carroll
In-universe information
- Occupation: Kitchen porter
- Father: Harold Brown
- Brothers: Terry Brown
- Wife: Agnes Brown (1959–1990)
- Sons: Mark Brown; Dermot Brown; Rory Brown; Trevor Brown; Frankie Brown (debatable); Simon Brown (debatable); Malachy Brown (from an affair)
- Daughters: Cathy Brown
- Grandsons: Bono Brown; John Brown; George Brown; Ringo Brown
- Uncles: Mickey Brown
- First cousins: Nellie Scully
- Other relatives: Davi O'Malley

Nicholas "Redser" Brown is the late husband of Agnes Brown and the father of the Brown children.

Redser and Agnes met at a birthday party, held for Sadie Brady. Redser was vomiting at the time; he said "give me a pint of anything" and they gave him Windolene. Agnes claims he died young leaving her with young kids, but he is also mentioned to have bought the family's dog, Spartacus (roughly 1996). In the original series, it is mentioned that he won her in a 'big willy contest'. Although it's never explicitly explained how he died, Agnes once joked that his last words were "Oh fuck, it's a bus!" He is also known to have been fond of drink and both his legs had been amputated on separate occasions. His full name was given as Nicholas in the movie Agnes Brown.

Redser appears as a ghost in the 2021 live Halloween special where he is shown to strongly resemble his eldest son Mark. It is revealed that Redser was not a good husband and father. It was believed that only Agnes could see him, only for it to be revealed near the end of the special that he could also be seen by Grandad, who berates him for his attitude in life before punching him and telling him not to come back.

=== Unseen TV characters ===
==== Terry Brown ====
Terry Brown
- Mrs. Brown's Boys character
- Portrayed by: Unseen
- Introduced by: Brendan O'Carroll
In-universe information
- Father: Harold Brown
- Brothers: Redser Brown
- Grandsons: Davi O'Malley (possibly)
- Nephews: Mark Brown; Dermot Brown; Rory Brown; Trevor Brown; Frankie Brown (debatable); Simon Brown (debatable)
- Nieces: Cathy Brown
- First cousins: Nellie Scully
- Other relatives: Bono Brown; John Brown; George Brown; Ringo Brown

Terry Brown is the brother of Redser and paternal uncle to the Brown children. In Series One, Cathy receives a call which she thinks is a heavy breather. She tells him to get lost, but Agnes races through saying "No, wait! It might be your Uncle Terry, his asthma's very bad!". As Agnes only has the one sibling, Dolly, it is assumed that Terry is Redser's brother, and Grandad's other son.

It is also possible that Terry is the grandfather of Davi O'Malley mentioned by Agnes in A Madea Homecoming as Redser is not mentioned to have other brothers.

=== The book characters ===
==== Frankie Brown ====
Frankie Brown
- Mrs. Brown's Boys character
- Portrayed by: Unseen
- First appearance: 1990s
- Introduced by: Brendan O'Carroll
In-universe information
- Father: Redser Brown
- Mother: Agnes Brown
- Brothers: Mark Brown; Dermot Brown; Rory Brown; Trevor Brown; Simon Brown (debatable)
- Sisters: Cathy Brown
- Grandfathers: Harold Brown
- Uncles: Terry Brown
- Aunts: Dolly
- Nephews: Bono Brown; John Brown; George Brown; Ringo Brown

Francis "Frankie" Brown was (originally) the second child in the Brown family.

Frankie was the problem child; he was always getting into fights and bunking off school. However, at the end of the book The Chisellers, Frankie was gone and had taken everything, including Mark's new businessman's outfit. The family agreed to never speak of him again.

In an epilogue of the same book, Frankie was found dead. A young police constable walking his beat accidentally discovered the body of Frankie Brown beneath sheets of newspaper in an alley at the edge of Chelsea, on a freezing November night. The young man's body lay frozen in a foetal position. An autopsy revealed several facts, including: Frankie had died of hypothermia, that he was a long-time drug abuser, and that he had probably not eaten for at least three days. However, there was one secret the autopsy could not extract: For the last eight years of his life, Francis Brown had lived under the name of Ben Daly. Before burning the dead man's clothes, an assistant of the coroner's office went through the pockets in search of anything that might be valuable. They were empty but for a dirty, crumpled envelope upon which was written ‘Dublin Papers’.

Frankie has not appeared in the BBC series, but could be the unseen sixth child that is mentioned in the show.

==== Simon Brown ====
Simon Brown
- Mrs. Brown's Boys character
- Portrayed by: Danny O'Carroll (Original Series, 2002–2003); Unseen (BBC Series)
- First appearance: 1990s
- Introduced by: Brendan O'Carroll
In-universe information
- Occupation: Senior porter
- Father: Redser Brown
- Mother: Agnes Brown
- Brothers: Mark Brown; Dermot Brown; Rory Brown; Trevor Brown; Frankie Brown (debatable)
- Sisters: Cathy Brown
- Grandfathers: Harold Brown
- Uncles: Terry Brown
- Aunts: Dolly
- Nephews: Bono Brown; John Brown; George Brown; Ringo Brown

Simon Brown is (originally) the fifth son of the Brown family, the one Agnes is referring to when she says she had twins.

Simon appeared in the books and in the original television series in Dat place next to England. He works as a hospital porter and appears at Dermot and Maria's wedding. He speaks with a stutter and has a hearing aid in his right ear. In the books, he is Dermot's twin brother.

Simon has not appeared in the BBC series, but could be the unseen sixth child that is mentioned in the show. However, since he was originally portrayed by Danny O'Carroll (now Buster Brady), he would have to be recast.

== The McGoogan Family ==
=== Winnie McGoogan ===
Winnie McGoogan
- Mrs. Brown's Boys character
- Portrayed by: Claire Mullan (Original Series, 2002–2005); Eilish O'Carroll (Original Series, 2006–2008 & BBC Series)
- Duration: 1990s–
- First appearance: 21 February 2011 (BBC Series)
- Introduced by: Brendan O'Carroll
In-universe information
- Occupation: Housewife
- Husband: Jacko McGoogan
- Daughters: Sharon McGoogan
- Uncles: Mick

Winifred "Winnie" McGoogan is the dim-witted best friend of Agnes Brown.

Winnie lives next door to the Brown family, and is Agnes' lifelong friend. The pair frequently have tea together at the Brown home, or have drinks at Foley's, discussing their families and their shortcomings. Winnie is constantly made fun of or fooled by Agnes; however, she remains oblivious and Agnes does in fact deeply care for her. When Winnie and her family inherit a house, Agnes is sad and asks Winnie not to move; she agrees. Winnie often takes things such as jokes too seriously, leading to hilarious double-entendres. She once asked Mr. Foley for a quickie – she had misread the menu which said quiche, even though the kitchen was closed as Mr. Foley said.

In the episode "Orange Is The New Mammy", Winnie's star sign is revealed to be Libra, for those who are born between 23 September and 23 October.

In the 2026 New Year special "Stormin' Mammy", Winnie gets struck by lightning and becomes intelligent and uses her newfound intelligence to win Foley's pub quiz. Later in the episode, Winnie is electrocuted by Agnes' kettle, which causes her to return to normal.

Winnie is portrayed by O'Carroll's real-life sister, Eilish O'Carroll.

=== Jacko McGoogan ===
Jacko McGoogan
- Mrs. Brown's Boys character
- Portrayed by: Joe Peel (Original Series); Unseen (BBC Series)
- First appearance: 1990s
- Introduced by: Brendan O'Carroll
In-universe information
- Occupation: Unemployed
- Brothers: Willie McGoogan
- Wife: Winnie McGoogan
- Daughters: Sharon McGoogan

Jacko McGoogan is the constantly-hospitalised husband of Winnie, and the father of Sharon McGoogan.

Jacko is an unseen character, but he has a brother, Willy, who dies, making him the last of the McGoogans, and he inherits the family home from him. Winnie thinks that is ideal; the house is right next door to the hospital. However, the two do not move after Agnes requests that they don't. He is an almost-permanent fixture at the hospital, as he is severely accident-prone.

=== Sharon McGoogan ===
Sharon McGoogan
- Mrs. Brown's Boys character
- Portrayed by: Marion O'Dwyer (Original Series & 2009 Pilot); Fiona Gibney (BBC Series)
- Duration: 2011–
- First appearance: 26 December 2011 (BBC Series)
- Introduced by: Brendan O'Carroll
In-universe information
- Occupation: Barmaid
- Father: Jacko McGoogan
- Mother: Winnie McGoogan
- Uncles: Willie McGoogan; Mick (great)

Sharon McGoogan is the promiscuous daughter of Jacko and Winnie McGoogan.

Sharon, a barmaid at Foley's Pub, loves to shout. Her loud voice has caught the attention of many people when silence is needed or when she wants to talk. She is desperate for a boyfriend (a long-running gag is that she sleeps with most of the married men in Finglas); one Valentine's Day, she held up a paper bag in Foley's and shouted that whoever guessed right would be able to have sex with her. When one man shouted that it was a giraffe, Sharon shrugged and said that it was close enough. The man sat down, not as eager. Agnes hints that Sharon has had many affairs with married men. According to Winnie, Sharon is quite intelligent and gifted, to which even Agnes agrees as she speaks four languages, and feels she is wasting her talents working at Foley's.

Sharon is portrayed by O'Carroll's real-life sister-in-law, Fiona Gibney, the real-life sister of Jennifer Gibney (Cathy Brown). Fiona is also one of the producers of the series, working for O'Carroll's own production company BOC-PIX.

== Cathy's boyfriends ==
=== Mick O'Leary ===
Mick O'Leary
- Mrs. Brown's Boys character
- Portrayed by: Keith Duffy (Original Series); Mark Dymond (BBC Series); Martin Delany (Live)
- Duration: 2011–2013
- First appearance: 7 March 2011 (BBC Series)
- Last appearance: 30 December 2013
- Introduced by: Brendan O'Carroll
In-universe information
- Occupation: Policeman
- Father: Mr O'Leary
- Mother: Mrs O'Leary

Detective Michael "Mick, Mick The Dick" O'Leary is the former boyfriend of Cathy Brown.

Mick first appears in the episode Mammy's Merchandise in Series 1 and appeared in the first two episodes of Series 2 until the episode "Mammy's Coming!" when Maria Brown reveals that he is married and Cathy breaks up with him.

He is not seen again until Series 3 in the episode "Mammy?" when he returns on Cathy's doorstep and explains that he was divorced but Cathy and Agnes never gave him the chance to explain. The pair reunite but it doesn't last long as, in the New Years' episode "Who's A Pretty Mammy?", Mick says he has to go on a job with work. This makes Cathy suspicious and she learns that he is seeing another woman. It is revealed that Cathy tipped them off at Customs as drug smugglers to get back at Mick.

=== Professor Thomas Clowne ===
Professor Thomas Clowne
- Mrs. Brown's Boys character
- Portrayed by: Mike Pyatt
- Duration: 2012–2013
- First appearance: 16 January 2012 (BBC Series)
- Last appearance: 7 January 2013
- Introduced by: Brendan O'Carroll
In-universe information
- Occupation: Psychology professor
- Uncles: Johnathan Nicholson
- Aunts: Hilary Nicholson; Mary Sheridan
- First cousins: Maria Brown; Bethany
- Other relatives: John Brown; George Brown; Ringo Brown; John Sheridan; James Nicholson

Professor Thomas Clowne is the former boyfriend of Cathy Brown. According to Cathy, his surname is pronounced "cloon", though Agnes frequently mispronounces his name as "clown".

Thomas first appears in the episode "iMammy (Batteries Not Included)" in Series 2 and appeared in two episodes of Series 2 ("SuperMammy" and "Mammy's Going") he is keen to interview Agnes for a book but she ends up making him talk about his mother not liking him.

His last appearance is in Series 3 in the episode "Mammy's Inflation", where he asks Cathy to look after his dog for a year whilst he went to a university in America. As Cathy was expecting a marriage proposal she is angry that he wants her to mind his dog and leaves him.

Thomas is also a cousin of Maria as mentioned in the original series and live tour, although in the BBC series, it appeared that they hadn't met.

=== Gaston ===
Gaston
- Mrs. Brown's Boys character
- Portrayed by: Robbie Telfer
- Duration: 2017
- Appears on: 1 January 2017
- Introduced by: Brendan O'Carroll
In-universe information
- Occupation: Businessman

Gaston (or Crouton, as Agnes calls him) is a former boyfriend of Cathy, he is French, very antisocial, and extremely dominant of Cathy. One good example of this is when he was calling Sharon "Servant Woman" and barking orders at Cathy constantly. Sharon stated that his personality had nothing to do with him being French as she has met many nice Frenchmen before. Agnes describes him as having "the personality of a speed bump". He calls Cathy 'Kitty' every time he addresses her, which annoys Agnes; it annoys her even more when he announces to Cathy that her family is disgraceful and that he will not put up with their camaraderie anymore, and even more so when he says that Agnes is "lower class than an Olive Farmer's Concubine". This prompts Agnes to headbutt him, which annoys him to the point where he calls her "a camel's scrotum", which prompts Cathy to kick him in the groin area and dump him.

== The other characters ==
=== Buster Brady ===
Buster Brady
- Mrs. Brown's Boys character
- Portrayed by: Danny O'Carroll (Original Series, 2004–2008), (BBC Series)
- Duration: 2011–
- First appearance: 28 February 2011 (BBC Series)
- Introduced by: Brendan O'Carroll
In-universe information
- Occupation: Former career criminal/promotor
- Father: Unnamed father
- Mother: Unnamed mother
- Sons: Blister Brady
- Grandparents: Unnamed grandparents (deceased)
- Other relatives: Sadie Brady (possible relative)

Buster Brady is the breakout character in the show and Dermot's criminal best friend.

Buster almost never budges from his regular outfit, consisting of a baseball cap, a jacket (he wears three or four different jackets), tracksuit bottoms, and white trainers, exceptions including when he wore his Best Man's suit for Dermot and Maria's wedding, although he was still wearing his cap and trainers, and when he played the angel in the Nativity in The Virgin Mammy for which he wore a white cap. Buster's jacket and trousers both have security tags attached, implying they are stolen, and he almost never wears his cap backwards, except only briefly in series 3 episode 6 "Mammy Swings!" when he tried to get a sneak peek at Agnes's new kitchen.

Buster often came up with scams and wheezes to earn money or to gain something for his own benefit, often roping Dermot in as an accomplice. He eventually gave it up and now works alongside Dermot promoting. He is very much disliked by Mrs Brown who sees him as a bad influence on Dermot; however in the later series she occasionally warms to him, such as when she lets him stay for a family Christmas dinner as he had no close family of his own to spend it with, and again at New Year. She also recognises that he is genuinely Dermot's friend and cares about Dermot. Agnes states this when Maria will not allow him to be Dermot's best man. Buster himself seems very fond of Mrs Brown, seemingly oblivious to her dislike for him.

Buster is somewhat unintelligent, and frequently says stupid or irritating things with little regard for how others will react. However, he has on several occasions displayed a certain amount of cunning; for example, when he and Dermot were competing for a contract against another promotion company, Buster sabotaged their rivals by stealing their boxes of flyers and replacing them with Dermot and Buster's flyers, ultimately resulting in Dermot and Buster being awarded the contract.

It is unknown if Buster is related to Sadie Brady, at whose party Agnes and Redser met. In "Mammy's Widow Memories", Buster said that his birth year is 1988 which would make him either 37 or 38 as of 2026.

Buster is in love with Cathy, as shown in several episodes; this is normally played for laughs with him either being inappropriate or outright rejected. However, in the episode "Mammy's Gamble", he learned that Cathy was planning to attempt to conceive via artificial insemination and offered to marry her to give her a child, and a father for the child, saying he'd always loved her. Cathy was actually touched and whilst she said no and that she didn't love him, she said it was the weirdest and sweetest proposal she'd ever had.

In "Mammy's Hotel", Buster meets his son Blister.

Buster is portrayed by O'Carroll's real-life son, Danny O'Carroll, and is the real-life husband of Amanda Woods (Betty Brown) and father of Jamie (Bono Brown) and Blake O'Carroll (Blister Brady).

=== Hillary Nicholson ===
Hillary Nicholson
- Mrs. Brown's Boys character
- Portrayed by: Eilish O'Carroll (Original Series, 2002–2005); Sorcha Cusack (BBC Series, 2011), Justice Dickie in Mrs. Brown's Boys D'Movie, (2014); Susie Blake (BBC Series, 2011–)
- Duration: 2011–2013, 2015, 2017–
- First appearance: 28 February 2011 (BBC Series)
- Introduced by: Brendan O'Carroll
In-universe information
- Occupation: Housewife secretary of the school board
- Father: John Sheridan
- Sisters: Mary Sheridan
- Husband: Sinbad Nicholson (original series); Johnathan Nicholson
- Daughters: Maria Brown
- Grandsons: John Brown; George Brown; Ringo Brown
- Nephews: Thomas Clowne
- Nieces: Bethany

Hillary Nicholson (née Sheridan) is the snobbish mother of Maria and the maternal grandmother of the Brown triplets.

Despite her rich background, her great-grandfather made a living by pushing a cart of dead dogs around the streets. Bar Dermot, Hillary looks down on the Brown family at first, referring to them as "riff-raff", she is gradually getting used to them and their surroundings. She is very protective of her daughter, and when planning Dermot and Maria's wedding, thinks of relocating the ceremony to Italy. However, she changes her mind when Agnes reminds her that her father, John, was the vicar at St. Jarleth's Church – and he hasn't been seen since the money from the collection disappeared. Hillary may seem snobbish and acts like she couldn't care less, but deep down she can be kind and caring.

=== Dr. Flynn ===
Dr. Flynn
- Mrs. Brown's Boys character
- Portrayed by: Harry Delany (Original Series); Derek Riddin (BBC Series); Eilish O'Carroll (Live tour)
- Duration: 2011–
- First appearance: 21 February 2011 (BBC Series)
- Introduced by: Brendan O'Carroll
In-universe information
- Occupation: Doctor
- Aunts: Sheila Flynn

Dr. Flynn is Finglas' resident doctor.

Dr. Flynn usually appears in the Brown household attending to Grandad. He is shown to be very capable in his job, despite Agnes often interfering when he is treating Grandad. He also gave Agnes her wish to have Grandad tested for mental problems, for him to be put in a home while she goes to the Galway Races.

Dr. Flynn is shown to have a minor romantic interest in Cathy. He also became self-appointed Head Judge of the judging panel of Father Damien's Christmas house decorating competition, and abused his position by giving the prize (two tickets to go see the Finglas Warriors football team in the finals) to his aunt, Sheila.

=== Barbara ===
Barbara
- Mrs. Brown's Boys character
- Portrayed by: Emily Regan
- Duration: 2011–
- First appearance: 28 February 2011 (BBC Series)
- Introduced by: Brendan O'Carroll
In-universe information
- Occupation: Hairdresser

Barbara (played by Emily Regan) is a minor recurring character in the show. Although she appears several times throughout the series, mostly in Foley's, she doesn't actually speak until New Mammy, where she drops by the Brown household to check on Rory after he has an almighty bust-up with Dino and is feeling depressed. She makes some negative comments about Dino, calling him a "bitchy diva", before she realizes Dino is behind her and he tells her he has "a new sweeping brush for [her] to try out".

Barbara works alongside Rory and Dino at the Wash & Blow hair salon, but aside from her occupation, no other facts are known about her except that in New Mammy, it is revealed she is a trainee.

In Mrs Brown's Boys D'Movie, Barbara plays her usual background, mostly non-talking role for the most part, but she only has two lines in the whole movie, and they are both spoken in the scene where she and Dino are preparing Rory for his failed swim across the Channel; first, Barbara compliments Rory for his bravery whilst rubbing sun cream on his chest before Dino moves her hand and tells her he'll handle it to which Barbara simply responds "Fine". She has no dialogue for the rest of the movie.

After Rory and Dino get stranded in China and decide to stay there, Barbara becomes the new owner of Wash & Blow.

Barbara is played by Emily Regan, who is the real-life wife of Paddy Houlihan (Dermot Brown).

=== Father Quinn ===
Father Quinn
- Mrs. Brown's Boys character
- Portrayed by: Mike Pyatt (Original Series); Gary Lilburn (BBC Series); Pat “Pepsi” Shields (Live tours)
- Duration: 2011–2013
- First appearance: 14 March 2011 (BBC Series)
- Last appearance: 28 January 2013
- Introduced by: Brendan O'Carroll
In-universe information
- Occupation: Priest

Father Quinn is the former priest of the local parish in Finglas.

Father Quinn is first seen when Agnes and Winnie crash the funeral party of Paddy Murphy, believing that it's where Maria's hen party is. He comforts Murphy's widow as Agnes and Winnie leave embarrassed. He begins to lose faith and turns to alcohol when a group of Mormons begin converting locals. In 2012, he leaves Finglas to go to rehab, at which point, Father Damien replaces him. After returning from rehab, he is quick to drink again after having seen Agnes again, who offers him a bottle, together with an incident involving Dermot's mobile phone, which she believes is stolen and hiding it in her bloomers; unfortunately, Buster rings it, causing Agnes to have an orgasm. He leaves the series and returns to rehab, where he is presumed to be currently.

=== Father Damien ===
Father Damien
- Mrs. Brown's Boys character
- Portrayed by: Conor Moloney
- Duration: 2012–
- First appearance: 24 December 2012
- Introduced by: Brendan O'Carroll
In-universe information
- Occupation: Priest
- Mother: Maureen

Father Damien is the current priest of the local parish in Finglas.

Father Damien is first seen when Hillary introduces him to Agnes after he comes to Finglas to replace Father Quinn in the first of the two 2012 Christmas Specials. He is strong to protest against Agnes' play version of the Nativity. However, he gives in and gets permission from the Bishop once Agnes gets him to make amends with his own mother over the phone. He baptizes the Brown triplets and later visits Agnes, but accidentally causes her to act-up after he accidentally says one of the hypnosis words that turns her into a stripper (as the hypnotist at the baptism party didn't completely remove the hypnosis from her). When Rory and Dino are getting married, he tells Agnes (despite her protests) that he cannot bless them as the Church is against same-sex marriage. But he later shows up at the Brown house to celebrate their marriage as he personally is happy to celebrate all forms of love.

Father Damien also appears in All Round to Mrs Brown's, where he along with Trevor, hosts a segment called "Thought for the Day". In a rather marked contrast to his series self, Father Damien is shown here to be rather childish, acting like a child, often providing non-sequiturs and rather humorous lines to the segment, with Trevor serving as the "only straight man" in the act. Father Damien has a good friendship with Trevor Brown.

The 2023 Christmas special "Mammy's Mare" introduces Damien's mother Maureen, who has Alzheimer's Disease.

Father Damien is portrayed by Conor Moloney.

=== Mr. Foley ===
Mr. Foley
- Mrs. Brown's Boys character
- Portrayed by: Mike Pyatt (Original Series, 2002); Mike Nolan (Original Series, 2004–2008, BBC Series, 2012–); Smug Roberts (BBC Series, 2011–2012)
- Duration: 2011–
- First appearance: 21 February 2011 (BBC Series)
- Introduced by: Brendan O'Carroll
In-universe information
- Occupation: Pub landlord
- Sons: Josh Foley; Oliver Foley
- Daughters: Nicole Foley

Mr. Foley is the landlord of Foley's Pub.

Mr. Foley appears mostly in unspeaking roles behind the bar, but has spoken occasionally. In the original series, he was talking to a drunk Sharon and mentioned his wife had died. During a conversation with Agnes, he mentions his three children Nicole, Josh and Oliver. Besides this, little is known about his private life.

=== Father McBride ===
Father McBride
- Mrs. Brown's Boys character
- Portrayed by: Jimmy Gibney
- Duration: 2013–2014, 2018
- First appearance: 30 December 2013 (Ireland); 1 January 2014 (UK)
- Last appearance: 25 December 2021
- Introduced by: Brendan O'Carroll
In-universe information
- Occupation: Priest

Father McBride is a priest who appeared in the 2013 New Year Special, "Who's a Pretty Mammy?" He encourages Agnes to take care of Lulu, a pet parrot that belonged to the late Mary Sheridan, sister to Hillary Nicholson and aunt to Maria. Later, he comes to blows with Agnes over the issue of whether Bono will be attending the notorious local school, St Stephen's. Mark and Betty want Bono to go to school outside the parish, and Agnes, fearful of Bono getting bullied if he goes to St Stephen's, agrees with them, but Father McBride refuses to sign the form to allow it to happen, saying that too many good children are leaving the parish. However, Lulu quickly makes him change his mind, after she says "Is it a bird? Is it a plane? Or is it Father McBride?", "Who's for a ride on Father McBride?" and "Ooh, that's a big one!". Fearful of his reputation, Father McBride asks to take care of Lulu. Agnes agrees, but only if he will sign the form; he reluctantly agrees.

Father McBride reappears in the movie, officiating at the funeral for Mary Moccasin. After a four-year absence from the screen, McBride returned, in the 2018 Christmas special "Exotic Mammy", as one of the three judges, alongside Hillary Nicholson and Dr. Flynn, in Father Damien's Christmas house decorating competition. Here, he is mentioned as being the priest of another parish, and has a considerably friendlier personality than he did in "Who's a Pretty Mammy?"

=== Blister Brady ===
Blister Brady
- Mrs. Brown's Boys character
- Portrayed by: Blake O'Carroll
- Duration: 2019-
- First appearance: 1 January 2019
- Introduced by: Brendan O'Carroll
In-universe information
- Father: Buster Brady

Blister Brady is the son of Buster Brady.

Blister first appeared in the 2019 New Year special "Mammy's Motel" where Buster discovers his existence. Later on in the episode, Cathy and Maria work out that Buster isn't his biological father, but when they confront Buster over the issue, they haven't the heart to tell him and instead say that "he couldn't have a better father than you".

He reappeared in the 2020 New Year special "Orange Is The New Mammy".

Blister is shown to have a similar dress sense to his father.

Blister's most recent appearance was in the 2025 New Year special.

He is portrayed by Blake O'Carroll, the real-life son of Danny O'Carroll (Buster Brady) and Amanda Woods (Betty Brown), the brother of Jamie O'Carroll (Bono Brown) and grandson of Brendan O'Carroll.

=== Birdie Flanagan ===
Birdie Flanagan
- Mrs. Brown's Boys character
- Portrayed by: June Rodgers
- Duration: 2023-
- First appearance: 13 September 2023
- Introduced by: Brendan O'Carroll
In-universe information
- Sons: Enzo Flanagan

Birdie Flanagan is a neighbour and friend of Agnes.

She first appeared in the second episode of the 2023 miniseries "Mammy Scissorhands" where she moves into the house neighbouring Agnes'. Father Damien later introduces Birdie to Agnes and the pair befriend each other soon after. At first, Winnie was jealous of Birdie and believed that she was now Agnes' best friend, but Agnes later assured Winnie that she was just being welcoming to Birdie and that Winnie would always be her best friend.

June Rodgers previously appeared in the movie released in 2014 as Fat Annie McCrum and the 2018 Christmas special entitled “Exotic Mammy” as Buster Brady's blind date and also the Dublin accent on the Maggie device given to Agnes by Dermot and Buster.

She has been married three times and has seven children, one of which is a son named Enzo, who appears in the 2025 Christmas special.

=== Enzo Flanagan ===
Enzo Flanagan
- Mrs. Brown's Boys character
- Portrayed by: Eric O'Carroll
- Duration: 2025
- First appearance: 25 December 2025
- Introduced by: Brendan O'Carroll
In-universe information
- Mother: Birdie Flanagan

Enzo Flanagan is the son of Birdie Flanagan.

He first appeared in the 2025 Christmas special "Mammy's Bottles" where he is seen in Foley's singing and playing banjo rather poorly. Whilst Birdie praises him, Agnes expresses displeasure.

Enzo reappears in the 2026 New Year special where he plans to manage Winnie (who had become intelligent after being stuck by lightning), but changes his mind when Winnie loses her intelligence after being electrocuted by Agnes' kettle.

He is portrayed by Eric O'Carroll, the real life son of Brendan O'Carroll (who plays Agnes) and real life brother of Danny O'Carroll (who plays Buster Brady) and Fiona O'Carroll (who plays Maria Brown).

=== Garda Stephen Ferguson ===
Garda Stephen Ferguson
- Mrs. Brown's Boys character
- Portrayed by: Stephen McConnell
- First appearance: 31 December 2014
- Introduced by: Brendan O'Carroll
In-universe information
- Occupation: Garda (Police officer)

Garda Ferguson is the local law enforcement. The character first appeared in an episode broadcast on 31 December 2014 and has continued to feature in multiple episodes, specials, and Christmas programmes. Garda Ferguson is portrayed as a regular presence in the community, with storylines including escorting Agnes Brown home in heavy snow, apprehending a burglar during a break in incident, delivering a community watch talk at Foley's Bar, and informing the Brown family of sensitive or serious news on several occasions. In one comedic storyline, the character is accidentally run over by Winnie McGoogan.
