= Maureen O'Carroll =

Irish politician (1913–1984)

Teachta Dála
- In office May 1954 – March 1957
- Constituency: Dublin North-Central

Personal details
- Born: Julia Mary McHugh; 29 March 1913 Dublin, Ireland
- Died: 9 May 1984 (aged 71) Dublin, Ireland
- Party: Labour Party
- Spouse: Gerard O'Carroll (m. 1933; died 1962)
- Children: 11, including Eilish and Brendan
- Education: University College Galway

Maureen O'Carroll (née McHugh; 29 March 1913 – 9 May 1984) was an Irish Labour Party politician who served as a Teachta Dála (TD) for the Dublin North-Central constituency from 1954 to 1957. O'Carroll was the Labour Party's first-ever female TD. O'Carroll introduced women into the Garda Siochana and ensured that the word "illegitimate" no longer appeared on birth certificates.

== Background ==
Maureen O'Carroll was born Julia Mary McHugh on 29 March 1913 on Wellington Street, Dublin. She was the eldest child of Michael McHugh and Elizabeth O’Dowd. Her father had been a participant in the Easter Rising as well as a journalist and was very influential upon her. He died in 1924, when she was aged 11. She was educated at Gortnor Abbey in Crossmolina, County Mayo on a scholarship before moving to University College Galway. She returned to Gortnor Abbey to become a Novitiate (novice nun) and took the name Mother St Francis Regis, however, she later decided not to commit to that life. By 1936, she was a civil servant and had married her husband Gerard, a former neighbour on Manor Street. The couple first lived in Stoneybatter. Later she became a schoolteacher and mother of eleven children (including comedians Brendan and Eilish O'Carroll). She was widowed in 1965.

== Political career ==
She entered politics as a founder of the Lower Prices Council, which campaigned against high prices, scarcity and black marketeering in the aftermath of World War II. The Dublin Opinion gave her the nickname "little Mo". The work of the Council, which was mostly made up of women, was known as "Women’s Parliament" and it's activities were monitored by the Garda Síochána.

She was elected to Dáil Éireann on her first attempt, at the 1954 general election to the 15th Dáil, when she was the third candidate to be elected in the three-seat Dublin North–Central constituency, defeating sitting Fianna Fáil TD Colm Gallagher. She served as Labour's Chief Whip from 1954 to 1957, and was the first woman to hold that position in any Irish political party. During that time she was pregnant with her tenth child, Brendan.

During her time as a TD, she was credited with introducing female members to the Garda Síochána, then known as Ban Gardaí (Women Guards). The Ban Gardaí would later serve as her guard of honour at her funeral in 1984. She is also credited as helping to remove the status of "illegitimate" or "bastard" from birth certificates. She also raised the issue of illegal adoptions to the United States in the Dáil, and she adopted a son, Phil who had been living in the Industrial School at Artane.

At the 1957 general election, she was defeated, and Gallagher retook the seat. O'Carroll did not stand again for election to the Dáil. She remained active in politics until 1970, working for Dublin Corporation with homeless children and continued to campaign on social and economic issues.

== Death ==
On 9 May 1984, O'Carroll took her grandson Danny, one of the children of Brendan, who was 8 months old at the time, up to her room where she was living at the time for a nap. She died as Danny slept. She was buried with full state honours. O'Carroll Villas in Dublin 2 is named for her.

Dáil	Election	Deputy (Party)	Deputy (Party)	Deputy (Party)	Deputy (Party)
13th	1948	Vivion de Valera (FF)	Martin O'Sullivan (Lab)	Patrick McGilligan (FG)	3 seats 1948–1961
14th	1951	Vivion de Valera (FF)	Colm Gallagher (FF)	Patrick McGilligan (FG)	3 seats 1948–1961
15th	1954	Vivion de Valera (FF)	Maureen O'Carroll (Lab)	Patrick McGilligan (FG)	3 seats 1948–1961
16th	1957	Vivion de Valera (FF)	Colm Gallagher (FF)	Patrick McGilligan (FG)	3 seats 1948–1961
16th	1957 by-election	Vivion de Valera (FF)	Frank Sherwin (Ind.)	Patrick McGilligan (FG)	3 seats 1948–1961
17th	1961	Vivion de Valera (FF)	Frank Sherwin (Ind.)	Patrick McGilligan (FG)	Celia Lynch (FF)
18th	1965	Vivion de Valera (FF)	Michael O'Leary (Lab)	Luke Belton (FG)	Celia Lynch (FF)
19th	1969	George Colley (FF)	Michael O'Leary (Lab)	Luke Belton (FG)	Celia Lynch (FF)
20th	1973	George Colley (FF)	Michael O'Leary (Lab)	Luke Belton (FG)	Celia Lynch (FF)
21st	1977	Vincent Brady (FF)	Michael O'Leary (Lab)	Michael Keating (FG)	3 seats 1977–1981
22nd	1981	Vincent Brady (FF)	Charles Haughey (FF)	Noël Browne (SLP)	George Birmingham (FG)
23rd	1982 (Feb)	Vincent Brady (FF)	Charles Haughey (FF)	Richard Bruton (FG)	George Birmingham (FG)
24th	1982 (Nov)	Vincent Brady (FF)	Charles Haughey (FF)	Richard Bruton (FG)	George Birmingham (FG)
25th	1987	Vincent Brady (FF)	Charles Haughey (FF)	Richard Bruton (FG)	George Birmingham (FG)
26th	1989	Vincent Brady (FF)	Charles Haughey (FF)	Richard Bruton (FG)	Ivor Callely (FF)
27th	1992	Seán Haughey (FF)	Derek McDowell (Lab)	Richard Bruton (FG)	Ivor Callely (FF)
28th	1997	Seán Haughey (FF)	Derek McDowell (Lab)	Richard Bruton (FG)	Ivor Callely (FF)
29th	2002	Seán Haughey (FF)	Finian McGrath (Ind.)	Richard Bruton (FG)	Ivor Callely (FF)
30th	2007	Seán Haughey (FF)	Finian McGrath (Ind.)	Richard Bruton (FG)	3 seats from 2007
31st	2011	Aodhán Ó Ríordáin (Lab)	Finian McGrath (Ind.)	Richard Bruton (FG)	3 seats from 2007
32nd	2016	Constituency abolished. See Dublin Bay North			
