= Danny O'Carroll =

Irish actor and producer (born 1983)

- Born: 16 October 1983 (age 42); Dublin, Ireland
- Occupations: Actor; producer
- Known for: Buster Brady in Mrs. Brown's Boys and All Round to Mrs. Brown's
- Spouse: Amanda Woods (m. 2007; sep. 2024)
- Partner: Martina Wats (2024–present)
- Children: 2
- Parents: Brendan O'Carroll (father); Doreen Dowdall (mother)
- Relatives: Brendan O'Carroll Jnr (Brother); Eric O'Carroll (Brother); Fiona O'Carroll (Sister); Eilish O'Carroll (Aunt); Jennifer Gibney (Stepmother)

Danny O'Carroll (born 16 October 1983) is an Irish actor and producer. He is best known for portraying Buster Brady (associate of the son of matriarch Agnes Brown) on stage, and in the BBC and RTÉ television sitcom Mrs. Brown's Boys.

== Early life and family ==
O'Carroll was born on 16 October 1983 in Dublin. He is the son of Brendan O'Carroll, who plays Agnes Brown in the series, as well as the brother of Fiona O'Carroll, nephew of Eilish O'Carroll, and stepson of Jennifer Gibney, all of whom also feature in the series. As a teenager, O'Carroll was diagnosed with dyslexia, which his father and brother Eric were also diagnosed with around the same time.

== Career ==
As well as Mrs. Brown's Boys, O'Carroll also starred in and was an executive producer of the Mrs. Brown's Boys D'Movie. Channel 4 offered him an international travel series. Due to family commitments, O'Carroll declined the opportunity to participate in Dancing on Ice in 2019.

On 10 December 2024, O'Carroll was announced to be taking part in the eighth season of the Irish version of Dancing with the Stars.

From 5 January 2026, O'Caroll began co-presenting an afternoon programme on Highland Radio.

== Personal life ==
O'Carroll lives in County Donegal. He is involved in fundraising for various causes, including autism, mental health and childhood illnesses.

O'Carroll married Amanda Woods in 2007. She portrays Betty Brown in Mrs. Brown’s Boys. They have two sons. In 2024, he appeared to confirm their separation by sharing a photo with his new partner.

== Filmography ==
=== Film ===
Year	Film	Character(s)
1999	Angela's Ashes	Clarke
2000	When the Sky Falls	Shaughnessy's son
2014	Mrs. Brown's Boys D'Movie	Buster Brady

=== Television ===
Year	Title	Role
2002–2008	Mrs Brown's Boys The Original Series	Simon Brown; Buster Brady
2008	Britain's Got the Pop Factor... and Possibly a New Celebrity Jesus Christ Soapstar Superstar Strictly on Ice	CD printing worker
2011–present	Mrs. Brown's Boys	Buster Brady
2017–2022	All Round to Mrs. Brown's	Buster Brady
2018	For Facts Sake	Self
2026	Shedites	Barry (Cheesy)
