= All Round to Mrs. Brown's =

- Genre: Comedy; Talk show
- Created by: Brendan O'Carroll
- Based on: Mrs. Brown's Boys by Brendan O'Carroll
- Directed by: John L. Spencer
- Presented by: Brendan O'Carroll
- Starring: Brendan O'Carroll; Jennifer Gibney; Paddy Houlihan; Fiona O'Carroll; Danny O'Carroll; Eilish O'Carroll; Pat Shields; Amanda Woods; Rory Cowan; Damien McKiernan; Gary Hollywood; Dermot O'Neill; Martin Delany; Conor Moloney; Aly Mahmoud
- Countries of origin: United Kingdom; Ireland
- Original language: English
- No. of series: 4
- No. of episodes: 24 (list of episodes)

Production
- Executive producers: Dan Baldwin; Andy Price
- Producers: Toby Brack; Fiona Gibney
- Running time: Approx. 60 minutes
- Production companies: BBC Studios Comedy Productions; BBC Scotland; Hungry Bear Media; BOC-PIX

Original release
- Network: RTÉ One; BBC One
- Release: 25 March 2017 – 25 April 2020

Related
- Mrs. Brown's Boys

All Round to Mrs. Brown's is a British-Irish comedy talk show created by and starring Brendan O'Carroll with his family and other cast members from his original comedy show, Mrs. Brown's Boys and Aly Mahmoud as Chef Aly. After the final episode of the first series aired, the BBC announced a second series, which started airing in 2018. A third series was announced which aired on 23 March 2019. A fourth series had been confirmed and started airing on 21 March and the series concluded on 25 April 2020. On 20 June it was confirmed that due to the COVID-19 pandemic the show will not return in 2021. In 2022 the series was officially cancelled.

The first series was the final TV appearance of Rory Cowan as Rory Brown, since Cowan left the franchise shortly after. The second series starred Cowan's replacement, Damien McKiernan, who debuted in the role during the 2017 Christmas special of Mrs Brown's Boys.

== Plot summary ==
Mrs. Brown opens the doors to her house for a Saturday night entertainment show in which she and the family are joined by celebrity guests.

== Episodes ==
Series	Episodes	Originally released		Average UK viewers (millions)
Series	Episodes	First released	Last released	Average UK viewers (millions)
1	6	25 March 2017	29 April 2017	6.54
2	6	19 May 2018	23 June 2018	4.89
3	6	23 March 2019	27 April 2019	5.01
4	6	21 March 2020	25 April 2020	4.27

=== Series 1 (2017) ===
No. overall	No. in series	Title	Directed by	Written by	Original release date	UK viewers (millions)
1	1	"Episode One"	John L. Spencer	Brendan O'Carroll	25 March 2017	7.20
Cathy Brown Show guests: Pamela Anderson, Judy Murray and Shirley Erskine; Foley's Music Night guests: James Blunt; Celebrity Tours guests: Louis Walsh
2	2	"Episode Two"	John L. Spencer	Brendan O'Carroll	1 April 2017	7.11
Cathy Brown Show guests: Holly Willoughby, Phillip Schofield, Lulu, Lynne Willoughby and Pat Schofield; Foley's Music Night guests: Kaiser Chiefs; Celebrity Tours guests: Adam Woodyatt
3	3	"Episode Three"	John L. Spencer	Brendan O'Carroll	8 April 2017	6.55
Cathy Brown Show guests: Kevin Bridges, Ross Kemp and Patricia Bridges; Foley's Music Night guests: Anton Powers and Pixie Lott; Celebrity Tours guests: Steve Backshall
4	4	"Episode Four"	John L. Spencer	Brendan O'Carroll	15 April 2017	6.18
Cathy Brown Show guests: Sue Perkins, Ashley Banjo and Danielle Banjo; Foley's Music Night guests: Aston Merrygold; Celebrity Tours guests: Emilia Fox
5	5	"Episode Five"	John L. Spencer	Brendan O'Carroll	22 April 2017	6.15
Cathy Brown Show guests: Gareth Malone, Peter Andre and Sîan Malone; Foley's Music Night guests: Steps; Celebrity Tours guests: Nick Knowles
6	6	"Episode Six"	John L. Spencer	Brendan O'Carroll	29 April 2017	6.03
Cathy Brown Show guests: Sunetra Sarker, Michael Ball and Bisakha Sarker; Foley's Music Night guests: The Vamps; Celebrity Tours guests: Yvette Fielding

The DVD issue of the first series omits all six music numbers in Foley's and all associated sketches with the music artists, except for James Blunt. Also, When Agnes is with Chef Aly and says "Reggae" the music they dance to has been changed from Shaggy's "Boombastic" to "She's Got Me Dancing" by Tommy Sparks.

=== Series 2 (2018) ===
BBC announced a second series, which began airing on 19 May 2018. Recording of the second series took during late April and early May 2018, with the second series airing from 19 May - 23 June 2018 on BBC One.

No. overall	No. in series	Title	Directed by	Written by	Original release date	UK viewers (millions)
7	1	"Episode One"	John L. Spencer	Brendan O'Carroll	19 May 2018	4.63
Cathy Brown Show guests: Danny Dyer, Amir Khan and Christina Dyer; Foley's Music Night guests: Tito Jackson; Celebrity Enterprises guests: Kate Humble
8	2	"Episode Two"	John L. Spencer	Brendan O'Carroll	26 May 2018	4.03
Cathy Brown Show guests: Freddie Flintoff, Jason Manford, Susan Flintoff and Sharon Manford; Foley's Music Night guests: Clean Bandit; Celebrity Enterprises guests: Fatima Whitbread and Jonnie Peacock
9	3	"Episode Three"	John L. Spencer	Brendan O'Carroll	2 June 2018	3.01
Cathy Brown Show guests: Gino D'Acampo, Christine Lampard and Mina Bleakley; Foley's Music Night guests: Shaggy and Sting; Celebrity Enterprises guests: Deborah Meaden and Peter Jones
10	4	"Episode Four"	John L. Spencer	Brendan O'Carroll	9 June 2018	3.63
Cathy Brown Show guests: Geri Horner, Gloria Hunniford and Ana Halliwell; Foley's Music Night guests: UB40 featuring Ali, Astro and Mickey; Celebrity Enterprises guest: Nigel Havers
11	5	"Episode Five"	John L. Spencer	Brendan O'Carroll	16 June 2018	5.09
Cathy Brown Show guests: Alan Davies, Marvin Humes, Rochelle Humes, Roz Wiseman and Sharon Humes; Foley's Music Night guests: Picture This; Celebrity Enterprises guest: Wayne Bridge
12	6	"Episode Six"	John L. Spencer	Brendan O'Carroll	23 June 2018	4.48
Cathy Brown Show guests: Jerry Springer, Boy George and Dinah O'Dowd; Foley's Music Night guests: Years & Years; Celebrity Enterprises guest: Ray Mears

=== Series 3 (2019) ===
The BBC recommissioned a third series for 2019 with filming taking place between 5 and 19 February.

Thought for the Day was removed from this series and was replaced with Father Damien's Audience Confessions

No. overall	No. in series	Title	Directed by	Written by	Original release date	UK viewers (millions)
13	1	"Episode One"	John L. Spencer	Brendan O'Carroll	23 March 2019	5.85
Cathy Brown Show guests: Teri Hatcher, Anna Friel, Rob Beckett and Julie Friel; Foley's Music Night guests: Naughty Boy, Calum Scott; D&B Comedy Stetch: Chris Kamara
14	2	"Episode Two"	John L. Spencer	Brendan O'Carroll	30 March 2019	3.77
Cathy Brown Show guests: Olly Murs, Emily Atack, Jane McDonald, and Kate Robbins; Foley's Music Night guests: Olly Murs; D&B Comedy Stetch: Martin Kemp
15	3	"Episode Three"	John L. Spencer	Brendan O'Carroll	6 April 2019	5.13
Cathy Brown Show guests: Noel Edmonds, Fay Ripley and Tina Allen; Foley's Music Night guests: James Morrison; D&B's Comedy Stetch: Shaun Williamson & Scarlett Moffatt
16	4	"Episode Four"	John L. Spencer	Brendan O'Carroll	13 April 2019	5.83
Cathy Brown Show guests: Clare Balding, Johnny Vegas and Patricia Pennington; Foley's Music Night guests: Red Hot Chilli Pipers; D&B's Comedy Sketch: Jamie Laing and Spencer Matthews
17	5	"Episode Five"	John L. Spencer	Brendan O'Carroll	20 April 2019	4.02
Cathy Brown Show guests: Jake Wood, Nicola Adams and Joelle Wood; Foley's Music Night guests: Westlife; D&B's Comedy Sketch: Lorraine Kelly
18	6	"Episode Six"	John L. Spencer	Brendan O'Carroll	27 April 2019	3.86
Cathy Brown Show guests: Paddy McGuinness, Dani Dyer and Joanne Dyer; Foley's Music Night guests: Busted; D&B's Comedy Sketch: Jason Donovan

=== Series 4 (2020) ===
The fourth series was filmed from 30 January - 11 February 2020, and has finished running the six episodes for this year.

D & B's celebrity tours, Mammy of the Week and the Wash & Blow Game Show were removed from this series and was replaced with more interaction with special guests.

No. overall	No. in series	Title	Directed by	Written by	Original release date	UK viewers (millions)
19	1	"Episode One"	John L. Spencer	Brendan O'Carroll	21 March 2020	3.36
Cathy Brown Show guests: Caitlyn Jenner, John Barrowman, Danny O'Donoghue, John and Marion Barrowman; Foley's Music Night guests: The Script
20	2	"Episode Two"	John L. Spencer	Brendan O'Carroll	28 March 2020	4.27
Cathy Brown Show guests: Lee Mack, Emilia Fox, Billy Ocean and Joanna David; Foley's Music Night guests: Billy Ocean
21	3	"Episode Three"	John L. Spencer	Brendan O'Carroll	4 April 2020	3.12
Cathy Brown Show guests: Mel B, Matt Lucas and Diana Lobatto; Foley's Music Night guests: Jax Jones & Raye
22	4	"Episode Four"	John L. Spencer	Brendan O'Carroll	11 April 2020	3.66
Cathy Brown Show guests: Harry Redknapp, Maya Jama, Mick Hucknall and Sadie Benjamin; Foley's Music Night guests: Simply Red
23	5	"Episode Five"	John L. Spencer	Brendan O'Carroll	18 April 2020	4.11
Cathy Brown Show guests: Eamonn Holmes, Ruth Langsford, Joel Dommett and Penny Dommett; Foley's Music Night guests: The Shires
24	6	"Episode Six"	John L. Spencer	Brendan O'Carroll	25 April 2020	3.75
Cathy Brown Show guests: Jonathan Ross, Robert Rinder, The Nolans and Angela Cohen; Foley's Music Night guests: Fleur East

== Ratings ==
All Round to Mrs. Brown's : UK viewers per episode (millions)

Season	Episode number					
Season	1	2	3	4	5	6
1	7.20	7.11	6.55	6.18	6.15	6.03
2	4.63	4.03	3.01	3.63	5.09	4.48
3	5.85	3.77	5.13	5.83	4.02	3.86
4	3.36	4.27	3.12	3.66	4.11	3.75

Audience measurement performed by Broadcasters' Audience Research Board

== Home release ==
The first series was released on DVD by Universal Pictures, on 16 October 2017. The pack also contains 14 minutes of additional content. The second series was released on 3 December 2018; the release included additional material such as extended outtakes and unseen clips. The third series was released on 2 December 2019, again with additional content. The fourth series is yet to be released as of January 2024.

== See also ==
- Mrs. Brown's Boys D'Movie
