= Fiona O'Carroll =

Irish actress

- Born: 14 September 1980 (age 45); Dublin, Ireland
- Occupation: Actress
- Television: Mrs. Brown's Boys (2011–); All Round to Mrs. Brown's (2017–2020)
- Spouse: Martin Delany (m. 2006; sep. 2021)
- Children: 4
- Parents: Brendan O'Carroll (father); Doreen Dowdall (mother)
- Relatives: Brendan O'Carroll, Jr. (brother); Eric O'Carroll (brother); Danny O'Carroll (brother); Eilish O'Carroll (aunt); Jennifer Gibney (stepmother)

Fiona O'Carroll is an Irish actress and a cast-member of the BBC/RTÉ sitcom, Mrs. Brown's Boys. Fiona is the daughter of Doreen O'Carroll and Mrs. Brown's Boys star and creator, Brendan O'Carroll.

== Early life and family ==
O'Carroll was born in Dublin in Ireland. Her younger brothers are Danny and Eric.

O'Carroll's stepmother is the Irish actress Jennifer Gibney, the wife of her father, Brendan O'Carroll.

== Career ==
O'Carroll has been a cast member of Mrs. Brown's Boys portraying Maria Brown since its inception. She reprised her role in the 2014 film, Mrs. Brown's Boys D'Movie and the 2017 chat show All Round to Mrs. Brown's.

In 2014, O'Carroll was also in the ITV drama The Widower.

In September 2022, O'Carroll took part in the gruelling reality show TV Special Forces Ultimate Hellweek, a show which pushes contestants to their physical and mental limits. She described the experience as life-changing.

Later that year, O'Carroll starred as Gretchen Ackerman in the touring production of Coppers the Musical.

In 2023, O'Carroll starred in the award-winning Jason Branagan short film Picture Day.

Later in 2023, O'Carroll won best actress at the Underground Cinema International Film Festival for her portrayal of Linda in Western Front Studios' short film They Can't Know About Me, directed by Michael Carolan.

== Personal life ==
O'Carroll married her Mrs. Brown's Boys co-star, Martin Delany in 2006. They have four sons together. In December 2021, she announced her split from Delany.

In August 2017, O'Carroll completed a 260-mile walk from Cork to Belfast in aid of Billy's World, a charity for children with special needs.

Her aunt Fiona O'Carroll, a sister of her father Brendan, died in 2020, in Canada.
