= Eilish O'Carroll =

Irish actress, writer and comedian (born 1952)

- Born: 5 November 1952 (age 73); Dublin, Ireland
- Occupations: Actress; writer; comedian
- Television: Mrs. Brown's Boys (2011–present); All Round to Mrs. Brown's (2017–2020)
- Partner: Marian O'Sullivan
- Children: 2
- Mother: Maureen McHugh
- Relatives: Brendan O'Carroll (brother); Danny O'Carroll (nephew); Fiona O'Carroll (niece)

Eilish O'Carroll (born 5 November 1952) is an Irish actress, writer, comedian and cast-member of the popular BBC sitcom, Mrs. Brown's Boys, where she plays the title character's best friend and neighbour, Winnie McGoogan. She also played Dr Flynn in the stage version of the show. Eilish is the sister of Mrs. Brown's Boys star and creator, Brendan O'Carroll.

== Career ==
O'Carroll has been a cast member of Mrs. Brown's Boys since its incarnation, and has played the role of Winnie McGoogan since the show's debut in 2011. She reprised her role in the 2014 film Mrs. Brown's Boys D'Movie and the 2017 chat show All Round to Mrs. Brown's.

In 2013, O'Carroll wrote and starred in an autobiographical one-woman stage show entitled 'Live Love Laugh'. She debuted the show at the Edinburgh Fringe Festival, for which she received positive reviews. She subsequently toured Live Love Laugh throughout the UK and Ireland up until 2018.

It was announced that O'Carroll would be a contestant on the third series of the Irish version of Dancing with the Stars in 2019.

== Personal life ==
She married her husband in 1971, with whom she had two sons, Stuart and Lee.

In 2003, O'Carroll began a relationship with a woman. She has stated she was homophobic until she came out in her forties. She now resides in Cork with her partner, Marian O'Sullivan.

In 2015, she was extremely outspoken in favour of the Together for Yes campaign during the referendum to amend the Irish constitution via the Thirty-sixth Amendment of the Constitution of Ireland.

In June 2025, while speaking to Joe Duffy on Liveline, her brother Brendan said: "Eilish is getting treatment at the moment and she's going through the hard bit but she's doing extremely well". He also added that his sister was "tough as nails, tough as nails." Brendan did not reveal which illness she is suffering from. In January 2026, O'Carroll revealed during an interview on The Six O'Clock Show that she had been receiving treatment for breast cancer.

== Filmography ==
=== Film ===
Year	Title	Role	Notes
2014	Mrs. Brown's Boys D'Movie	Winnie McGoogan	
2020	Tina Times Two	Dance Teacher	Short film

=== Television ===
Year	Title	Role	Notes
2002–2008	Mrs. Brown's Boys: The Original Series	Hillary Nicholson / Winnie McGoogan	Episodes 1–5
2011–present	Mrs. Brown's Boys	Winnie McGoogan	Series 1–5, plus Christmas & New Year Specials; 50 episodes
2016	The Boring Diary of Frances Noone	Granny Noone	Television short
2017–2020	All Round to Mrs. Brown's	Winnie McGoogan	Series 1–4; 17 episodes
2019	Dancing with the Stars	Herself - Contestant	Series 3; episodes 1–3 (weeks 1–3)
2021	The Madame Blanc Mysteries	Niamh	Series 1; episode 5
2022	The Hit List	Herself - Contestant	Series 5; episode 12: "Christmas Special" (with Fiona O'Carroll)
2024	The Dry	Old Lady	Series 2; episode 1: "Birthday"
2025	Love of the Irish	MJ	Television film

=== Stage ===
Year	Title	Role
1999	Mrs. Brown's Last Wedding	Winnie McGoogan
2002, 2011–2012, 2017	Good Mourning Mrs. Brown	Winnie McGoogan
2002, 2012, 2014	Mrs. Brown Rides Again	Winnie McGoogan
2007, 2013, 2018	For the Love of Mrs. Brown	Winnie McGoogan
2009, 2015	How Now Mrs. Brown Cow	Winnie McGoogan
2013–2018	Live Love Laugh	Herself
