= A Madea Homecoming =

2022 American film by Tyler Perry

- Promotional release poster
- Directed by: Tyler Perry
- Written by: Tyler Perry
- Produced by: Mark E. Swinton; Will Areu; Michelle Sneed
- Starring: Tyler Perry; Cassi Davis-Patton; David Mann; Tamela Mann; Gabrielle Dennis; Brendan O'Carroll
- Cinematography: Taylor Randall
- Edited by: Larry Sexton
- Music by: Philip White
- Production company: Tyler Perry Studios
- Distributed by: Netflix
- Release date: February 25, 2022
- Running time: 105 minutes
- Country: United States
- Language: English
- Budget: $20 million+

A Madea Homecoming is a 2022 American comedy film produced, written, and directed by Tyler Perry and his second film to be released by Netflix. It is adapted from Perry's stage play Madea's Farewell Play, the first Madea film to be adapted from a stage play since A Madea Christmas. It is the twelfth film in the Madea cinematic universe, and the first to be released on Netflix. The film is also a crossover between the Madea franchise and the Irish sitcom Mrs. Brown's Boys, with Brendan O'Carroll returning as the titular character. Besides Perry and O'Carroll, the film stars Cassi Davis-Patton, David Mann, Tamela Mann, and Gabrielle Dennis. The film tells the story of Madea partaking in her great-grandson's college graduation party as hidden secrets emerge and surprise visitors show up. It was released on February 25, 2022.

== Plot ==
In Atlanta, Georgia, Madea's household is getting ready for the graduation celebration of her great-grandson, Tim, who is accompanied by his friend and fellow graduate, Davi. Mr. Brown is initially involved, but is sent home after using a lot of flammable material intended for the barbecue, which sets him on fire. The visitors who turn up include Tim's mother Laura, who arrives with her friend Sylvia, who previously helped her in her divorce with her ex-husband Richard; Laura's sister Ellie, whose status as a cop pits her against Joe; Aunt Bam, who flirts with Davi upon seeing him; and Agnes and Cathy Brown, Davi's family from Ireland, whose arrival (which included a misinterpreation of the word "knicker" due to their language gap) came off as more abrupt than the others. Madea suspects Laura has found a new man, while Joe suspects Tim and Davi are a couple.

They go to dinner at Red Lobster later that night, with Mr. Brown regrouping with them. Joe turns up in Black Lives Matter attire to spite Agnes and Ellie. Back at the house, Richard arrives, with Joe letting him in. Triggered by his presence, Madea fires a warning shot when he tries to talk to her. Agnes later informs Laura that Davi will return to Ireland to take over his grandfather's farm after the graduation. Afterwards, with Davi's support, Tim comes out as gay (something that he finds out has been in discussion between the family), while Richard announces his engagement to Sylvia. After the couple is forced to leave, Cora finds out that she accidentally gave Agnes and Mr. Brown weed made to look like candy back at Red Lobster, as they came from Madea's purse. Later that night, while Laura and Ellie discuss Richard and Sylvia (with Laura reassuring she is okay with their relationship), Madea claims her roommate Rosa Parks stole her boyfriend in 1955, inadvertently setting off the Montgomery bus boycott and the Civil Rights movement as a whole. She uses that experience to convince Laura to get back at Sylvia.

The next morning, as Madea and Agnes form a friendship of their own, tensions rise when Richard and Sylvia come back to the barbecue at Tim's wishes. Sylvia apologizes to Laura for hooking up with Richard. Davi, likewise triggered by Richard's presence, fights him. He later reveals he has been seeing Laura and proposes to her, but she declines. Later after everything settles, Agnes tells Madea of her plans to send Davi back to Ireland, but with the recent discoveries, Madea tells her that children will eventually want to live their lives regardless of their wishes. Later that night, she also convinces Laura to take a chance at love and advises Tim that parents make mistakes before sending him to stay at his friend's house at his choice due to having a grudge towards Davi.

At the graduation, Tim rips up his prepared speech and speaks about his family, apologizes to Davi and Laura, and credits his family for their love and support. The family congratulates Tim and Davi, the former approving of the latter's relationship with Laura. Agnes gives Davi her blessing to stay in America by cancelling his ticket back home, revealing that his grandfather need not know as he is in prison for sleeping with a sheep in a hotel. With that, he proposes again to Laura, who says yes. Agnes and Cathy prepare to return to Ireland, but not before the former bids farewell to Madea.

== Cast ==
- Tyler Perry as:
  - Mabel "Madea" Simmons, a tough old lady, Perry also portrays Madea in the flashback sequence
  - Joe Simmons, Madea's brother
- Cassi Davis Patton as Betty Ann "Aunt Bam" Murphy, Madea's cousin
- David Mann as Leroy Brown, a man who was thought to be Cora's biological father until Madea's Big Happy Family
- Tamela Mann as Cora Simmons, Madea's daughter
- Gabrielle Dennis as Laura, Madea's granddaughter, Cora's daughter, and Tim's mother
- Brendan O'Carroll as Agnes Brown, Davi's great-aunt. O'Carroll reprises his role from Mrs. Brown's Boys
- Brandon Black as Timothy "Tim" Marshall, Madea's great-grandson, Cora's grandson and Laura's son who is struggling to come out
- Isha Blaaker as Davi O'Malley, Agnes's great-nephew, Cathy's first cousin once removed, and Tim's best friend
- Candace Maxwell as Ellie, Madea's granddaughter, Cora's daughter, and Laura's sister
- Geneva MacCarone as Sylvia, Laura's friend and Richard's fiancée
- Amani Atkinson as Richard, Laura's former husband, Tim's father, and Sylvia's fiancée
- Jennifer Gibney as Cathy Brown, Agnes's daughter and Davi's first-cousin-once-removed. Gibney reprises her role from Mrs. Brown's Boys

== Production ==
After originally planning to retire the Madea character after A Madea Family Funeral and Madea's Farewell Play, Tyler Perry later reverted these plans on a joint announcement with Netflix announcing Madea's return to film. Filming took place at Tyler Perry Studios in June 2021.

== Release ==
The film was released on February 25, 2022, by Netflix.

== Reception ==
On the review aggregator website Rotten Tomatoes, 36% of 14 critics' reviews are positive, with an average rating of 3.7/10. Metacritic gave the film a weighted average score of 42 out of 100 based on 6 critics, indicating "mixed or average" reviews.
