= Jennifer Gibney =

Irish actress (born 1964)

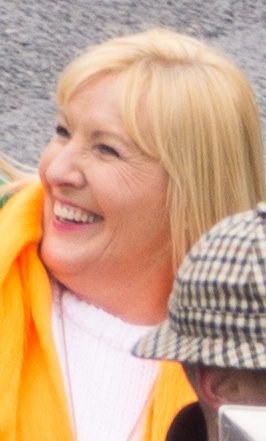
- Gibney in 2015
- Born: Jennifer Ann Gibney; 7 July 1964 (age 62); Dublin, Ireland
- Occupation: Actress
- Years active: 1996–present
- Known for: Cathy Brown in Mrs. Brown's Boys
- Spouse: Brendan O'Carroll (m. 2005)

Jennifer Ann O'Carroll (née Gibney; born 7 July 1964) is an Irish actress. She is best known for playing Cathy Brown in the BBC television sitcom, Mrs. Brown's Boys and its adaptations. She also appeared as a contestant on the twelfth series of Strictly Come Dancing in 2014.

== Early life ==
Jennifer Ann Gibney was born on 7 July 1964 in Dublin, Ireland. She worked as a civil servant in the Irish tax office for seven years and then joined the Bank of Ireland. Gibney studied for a drama degree while at the bank and joined the company's amateur dramatics group. She trained to be an actress at Dublin Oscar Theatre School.

== Career ==
Gibney's first professional acting role came in 1996, with a minor part in Some Mother's Son, a film starring Helen Mirren. In 1999, she appeared in the film Agnes Browne as Winnie the Mackerel. In 2007, she appeared in Prosperity as Linda.

Gibney's most prominent role is her portrayal of Cathy Brown, the daughter of Agnes Brown, played by her real-life husband, Brendan O'Carroll, a part she began playing in the 1990's in the original Mrs Browne, and subsequently the BBC sitcom Mrs. Brown's Boys since 2011. She also appeared as Cathy in the film adaption Mrs. Brown's Boys D'Movie and the talk show All Round to Mrs. Brown's between 2017 and 2020. Gibney and O'Carroll reprised their roles as the characters in the Netflix film A Madea Homecoming (2022).

=== Strictly Come Dancing ===
In 2014, Gibney took part in the twelfth series of Strictly Come Dancing. She was partnered with Irish professional Tristan MacManus. Gibney and MacManus were the second couple to be eliminated in week three of the competition after dancing to ABBA's "Mamma Mia" on Movie Week. She competed in the bottom two against Blue star Simon Webbe and his partner Kristina Rihanoff.

Week No.	Dance/Song	Judges' score						Result
Week No.	Dance/Song	Craig Revel Horwood	Darcey Bussell	Len Goodman	Bruno Tonioli	Donny Osmond	Total	Result
1	Jive – "Happy"	3	5	5	5	–	18	None
2	Waltz – "(You Make Me Feel Like) A Natural Woman"	4	5	5	5	–	19	Bottom two
3	Foxtrot – "Mamma Mia"	3	5	5	5	5	23	Eliminated

- Note: Donny Osmond was a guest judge for the third week

== Personal life ==
Gibney has been married to Brendan O'Carroll since 2005 and has three stepchildren, Fiona and Danny, who also appear in Mrs. Brown's Boys, and Eric.

== Filmography ==
=== Television ===
Year	Title	Role	Notes	Ref.
2002–2008	Mrs. Brown's Boys The Original Series	Cathy Brown	Main role	
2007	Prosperity	Linda	Episode: "Stacey's Story"	
2011–present	Mrs. Brown's Boys	Cathy Brown	Main role	
2014	Strictly Come Dancing	Herself	Series 12	
2017–2020	All Round to Mrs. Brown's	Cathy Brown	Main role	
2018	For Facts Sake	Herself		

=== Film ===
Year	Title	Role	Ref.
1996	Some Mother's Son	Woman Searcher No.2	
1999	Agnes Browne	Winnie	
2014	Mrs. Brown's Boys D'Movie	Cathy Brown	
2022	A Madea Homecoming	Cathy Brown	
