= Rory Cowan =

Irish actor and entertainer

- Born: Dublin, Ireland
- Education: University College Dublin
- Occupations: Actor; entertainer
- Known for: Mrs. Brown's Boys; Mrs. Brown's Boys D'Movie; Gogglebox Ireland

Rory Cowan is an Irish actor and entertainer. He is best known for portraying Rory Brown in Mrs. Brown's Boys from 2011 to 2017, and for starring in Mrs. Brown's Boys D'Movie in 2014. Afterwards, Cowan went on to play John Bosco Walsh in the RTÉ soap opera Fair City from 2019 to 2025.

== Early life ==
Rory Cowan was born in the Coombe Hospital in Dublin to Rory Cowan Sr. and Esther Cowan. His parents were trade-union activists, while his grandfather was the soldier, solicitor, and politician Peadar Cowan, who had fought in the Irish War of Independence. The Cowans lived in Dublin, Athlone and Limerick. Cowan attended St Benildus College in Stillorgan.

== Career ==
Cowan's mother wanted him to go into banking, but Cowan deliberately failed his math exam in order to avoid this. He then worked in a record shop owned by EMI, eventually becoming marketing manager of the holding company in Ireland. While there, he managed Christy Dignam and the drag act Mr Pussy, and first saw Brendan O'Carroll in performance. After being made redundant in 1992, he was asked to book an act for a venue that would bring in similar crowds to those that had accompanied Mr Pussy and Dignam; and suggested O'Carroll. As a result of this, he became O'Carroll's publicist, and has worked alongside him well into the 2010s. Soon afterwards, O'Carroll developed the Mrs Brown routine, creating the character of Rory Brown specifically for Cowan, although at first, Cowan did not take on the role as he was simply "the logistics man" who organised shows and bookings. The character of Rory Brown originally appeared in the radio slots, and was originally played on stage by another actor who resigned at short notice. As a result, Cowan, despite never having acted in front of an audience before, was asked to take on the role by O'Carroll, and his camp performance quickly became the definitive portrayal. In 2016, alongside actress Deirdre O'Kane, Cowan was signed up to the Irish version of Gogglebox, screened by TV3.

On 16 June 2017, Cowan gave O'Carroll his resignation notice, and the following month announced he had quit Mrs Brown's Boys. He described his parting from the company as "amicable" and completed a stage tour of the show, but did not appear in the 2017 Christmas special.

In 2019, Cowan joined the RTÉ soap drama Fair City. He left the show in 2025.

On 7 December 2023, it was announced that Cowan would be a contestant on the seventh series of the Irish version of the competition series, Dancing with the Stars. Cowan and his partner Jillian Bromwich were eliminated first.

== Personal life ==
Cowan is openly gay, and has often discussed his sexuality in the press and in interviews. He has lived in Kilmainham since 1990, and credits his work with O'Carroll with enabling him to afford to buy his house and achieve financial security. In December 2016, Cowan was a victim of homophobic online abuse on Twitter, which led to police reports being filed and an official investigation launched by the Gardaí.

On 12 August 2020, Cowan announced on Twitter that he had joined Fine Gael, after being persuaded by former Fine Gael TD Noel Rock.
