= Brendan O'Carroll's Hot Milk and Pepper =

- Genre: Light entertainment
- Directed by: Patrick Cowap
- Presented by: Brendan O'Carroll
- Starring: Gerry Browne
- Country of origin: Ireland
- Original language: English
- No. of series: 2
- No. of episodes: 56

Production
- Producer: Gerald Heffernan
- Production locations: Studio 4, RTÉ Television Centre, Donnybrook, Dublin 4
- Camera setup: Multi-camera
- Running time: 30 minutes

Original release
- Network: RTÉ One
- Release: 8 September 1996 – 17 April 1998

Brendan O'Carroll's Hot Milk and Pepper is an RTÉ television quiz show presented by Brendan O'Carroll and also starring Gerry Browne that was broadcast for two series between 1996 and 1998. The show featured two teams of four competing each week.

== History ==
Production company Frontier Films devised Brendan O'Carroll's Hot Milk and Pepper as a comedy quiz show vehicle for Brendan O'Carroll. It was devised as a replacement quiz show for Where in the World? which ended in 1996. O'Carroll claimed that the name referred to Margaret Thatcher's drink request when he worked as her butler for four days in 1984 at an EU summit.

=== Format ===
Hot Milk and Pepper featured two teams of four - the Pink team and the Green team. Each member of the team was linked (e.g. all four members of the team were taxi drivers from the same firm).

Round One: Connections The first round featured each member of the team picking the odd-one-out from a group of three related elements (e.g. Greek Gods). The four remaining odd elements were also linked and extra points were given if a team could name the connection.

Round Two: Match Up The second round featured two columns of eight. Each word in the left-hand column could match up to a related word on the right-hand column (e.g. US states and their capitals). Each contestant had to answer two questions each. If a team member got a question wrong the opposing team had a chance to steal and the question was passed over.

Round Three: Risky Business In this buzzer round the teams have to guess which word could come before of after another word. As extra words are revealed to help, the points awarded diminishes.

Round Four: Go For Broke The final round was for the winners of the previous three rounds. Each member could choose their own prize from the show's catalogue beforehand, but would only win the prize if the round was successfully completed. Prizes ranged from video recorders to holidays abroad. The final round featured twelve elements all linked to three different topics. There were three "red herrings". The team had to match up the different elements to the different topics and had two extra lives to do so.

== Production ==
Brendan O'Carroll's Hot Milk and Pepper was broadcast on RTÉ One on Sunday evenings from 8:00 p.m. to 8:30 p.m. For the second half of the second series the show moved to Friday evenings at 8:30 p.m. The show was pre-recorded before broadcast in Studio 4 in the RTÉ Television Centre at Donnybrook, Dublin 4. Following the initial two series the show was repeated in early morning and afternoon slots for the 1998–99 season.

== Reception ==
Hot Milk and Pepper received poor reviews. In 2000, O'Carroll observed that he "got it so wrong" with the game show saying that he did the show primarily because a senior RTÉ figure suggested to him that he owed RTÉ a show, considering all that they had done for him. With 45 minutes in studio needing to be cut to 25 minutes for TV, something had to go out and so O'Carroll's comedy had to be filleted out. When he saw the finished product, he "couldn't believe it."

RTÉ weather presenters John Doyle, Dr. Aidan Nulty and Joan Blackburn appeared on the programme on 4 January 1998.

The series went on RTE Player Christmas 2021 to celebrate 60 years of television.
