= The Winter Guest =

1997 film by Alan Rickman

- Theatrical release poster
- Directed by: Alan Rickman
- Written by: Sharman Macdonald; Alan Rickman
- Produced by: Steve Clark-Hall; Edward R. Pressman
- Starring: Phyllida Law; Emma Thompson; Sheila Reid; Sandra Voe; Arlene Cockburn; Gary Hollywood; Sean Biggerstaff; Douglas Murphy
- Cinematography: Seamus McGarvey
- Edited by: Scott Thomas
- Music by: Michael Kamen
- Production company: Capitol Films
- Distributed by: FilmFour Distributors
- Release dates: 28 August 1997 (Venice Film Festival); 24 December 1997 (United States); 9 January 1998 (United Kingdom)
- Running time: 108 minutes
- Country: United Kingdom
- Language: English
- Box office: $1.3 million

The Winter Guest is a 1997 drama film directed by Alan Rickman (in his feature directorial debut) and starring Phyllida Law and Emma Thompson.

== Plot ==
Set in Scotland on one wintry day, the film focuses on eight people; a mother and daughter, Elspeth (Phyllida Law) and Frances (Emma Thompson); two young boys skipping school, Sam (Douglas Murphy) and Tom (Sean Biggerstaff); two old women who frequently attend strangers' funerals, Chloe (Sandra Voe) and Lily (Sheila Reid); and two teenagers Nita (Arlene Cockburn) and Alex (Gary Hollywood). The film consists primarily of the interactions between the characters: recently widowed and unable to come to terms with her grief, Frances withdraws from life and leaves her sixteen-year-old son to take care of both of them. Her mother, the feisty Elspeth, has always had a difficult relationship with her, but she is determined to bring her back to life. This forms the central thread of the story, around which three other narrative strands unfold, featuring characters from three different generations.

== History ==
The film is based on Sharman MacDonald's play, premiered at the West Yorkshire Playhouse (in the Quarry studio theatre, 23 January to 18 February 1995) before transferring to the Almeida Theatre in London (14 March to 15 April 1995).

Like the film it was also directed by Rickman, starring Law, Reid, Voe and John Wark, with Siân Thomas in the role of Frances, played in the film by Emma Thompson.

Much of the film was shot in around Pittenweem, Elie and Earlsferry and Crail in Fife.

== Reception ==
The film was met warmly by critics, with Thompson winning an award at the Venice Film Festival. It holds a 63% "Fresh" score on review aggregator Rotten Tomatoes, based on 27 reviews with an average rating of 6.5/10.

In the United Kingdom, it grossed £250,689, and a worldwide total of $1.3 million.

=== Awards and nominations ===
- British Independent Film Awards (UK)
  - Nominated: Best British Actress (Emma Thompson)
- Brussels International Film Festival (Belgium)
  - Won: Audience Award (Alan Rickman)
- Chicago Film Festival (USA)
  - Won: Gold Hugo – Best Film (Alan Rickman)
- Czech Lion (Czech Republic)
  - Nominated: Best Foreign Language Film (Alan Rickman)
- European Film Awards
  - Nominated: Best Actress (Emma Thompson)
- Venice Film Festival (Italy)
  - Won: 'CinemAvvenire' Award (Alan Rickman; tied with A Ostra e o Vento and Giro di lune tra terra e mare).
  - Won: OCIC Award (Alan Rickman)
  - Won: Pasinetti Award – Best Actress (Emma Thompson)
  - Nominated: Golden Lion (Alan Rickman)
