= June Rodgers =

Irish comedian, singer and actress

- Born: 24 June 1959 (age 67); Tallaght, Dublin, Ireland

Comedy career
- Years active: 1990–present

June Rodgers (born 24 June 1959) is an Irish comedian, singer and actor. Much of her repertoire consists of multiple character skits, mainly focusing on working-class Dublin themes, including the characters of 'Jacinta O'Brien' and 'Oliver Bond' (named after the Oliver Bond flats). Her 2014 Merry Month of June Tour alone required 20 costume changes.

Rodgers' shows frequently include elements of song, dance and cabaret. She appeared as Fat Annie in the film Agnes Browne (1999) and played the same character in Mrs. Brown's Boys D'Movie (2014). She has also portrayed various characters in the BBC sitcom Mrs. Brown's Boys, before taking on the regular role of Birdie Flanagan in 2023.

== Early life ==
Rodgers was born on 24 June 1959 in the suburb of Tallaght when it was "still a sleepy rural village in County Dublin". In a 2014 interview, she recounted her earliest memory of sitting on the garden wall watching tractors and cattle passing by. In the Tallaght village of Rodgers youth, "everybody helped each other. It was like a little rural country village. All around that area was farming community". "People find that hard to believe now, because it's so built-up" Rodgers noted in 2024.

Rodgers was confirmed at St Patrick's Cathedral, Dublin, where she subsequently also attended school, alongside her sister Linda. She admits that she was not academically gifted at school.

There was no tradition of theatre in the family, although Rodgers recalls that the family would "go on Sunday drives and my mother and father would be singing in the front, and we (herself and her sister) would be falling asleep in the back". She attended Rathgar National School, and St Patrick's Cathedral Grammar School, where Bono was a classmate for a few years before he moved to Mount Temple Comprehensive School. Rodgers notes that she was "laughed at" in school due to her weight. She admitted that American singer Carole King was her "idol" in the 1970s, and that she played her 1971 LP Tapestry "non-stop (..) I still play it now, although the CD is a bit scratched." Rodgers added:

Being a teenager and not knowing what was going on with my feelings when it came to boys, Will You Love Me Tomorrow was my song. I spent most nights singing it into the mirror with my Denman hairbrush as a microphone, as I had a huge crush on a boy who liked me - but not as much as I liked him. The heartache of youth!

Rodgers has stated that at "around" the age of 11, herself and her sister got summer jobs at a location where they "made plastic spoons and rosary beads (and) we worked 8am to 5pm, Monday to Friday (..) We would get a brown envelope and it was ten shillings a week, which is the equivalent of 50 cents now. When you got ten shillings years ago, you thought you were a millionaire." The job was located beside the Urney Chocolate Factory, to get to which, Rodgers and sister walked along the Belgard Road, which "was all fields" at the time.

Rodgers won the Miss Tallaght beauty pageant in 1978. She and her parents moved to nearby Brittas when the suburb of Tallaght began to be heavily developed. At the age of 18, Rodgers moved to London for employment, which she found at the London Tara Hotel earning 32 pence a day. Rodgers remembered that at the time there were "a lot of Irish people in London", and she worked with girls from Limerick and Galway, some of whom she still kept in contact with as of 2024. The London Tara Hotel was owned by Aer Lingus at the time, and Rodgers recalled that staff received free flights home every six months.

After four years in London, and suffering somewhat from homesickness, Rodgers returned home. Some months after her return, her mother died aged 56, and Rodgers and her father moved to Firhouse, in the vicinity of Tallaght. Within a short space of time her father also died, aged 63, leaving her an orphan.

== Career ==
During the 1980s, Rodgers worked for nine and a half years in a Fujitsu Electronics factory in Tallaght, where she spent "eight hours a day looking down a microscope at cells on microchips". Fujitsu started a society where employees could perform together at the John Player Tops Of The Town talent contest, and in the 1980s, Rodgers joined as a dancer in the back row, musing "I was in the back-row because as you know all the lanky and fat ones would be there." Each year the final would be broadcast on RTÉ Television as a special and, eventually, Rodgers succeeded in making a higher billing, and branched into comedy.

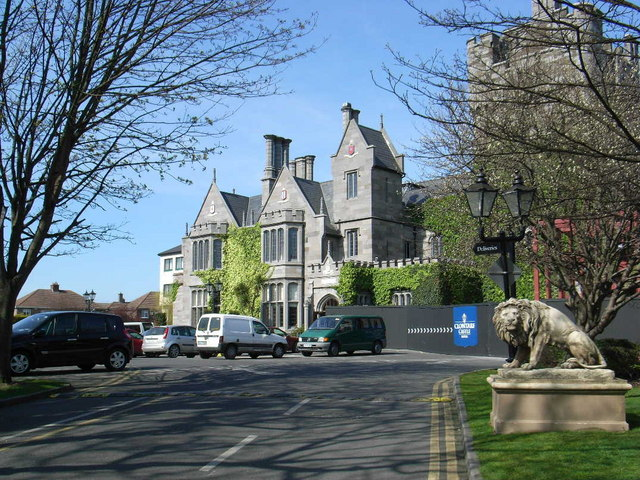
Clontarf Castle, where Rodgers experienced her big break

Rodgers was 34 years old when she started out as a professional entertainer, with a show at Clontarf Castle on the northside of the city. She notes her big break came whilst performing at a talent competition at the hotel there, at which she was spotted by television host Gay Byrne, then-presenter of the Irish chat show The Late Late Show. The following week, she received a phone call at her factory from The Late Late inviting her to perform three minutes on it that coming Friday. As part of the performance, she presented the characters 'Bridget the Beangharda' and a Henry Street dealer. She credits this first break on show as "pure luck", and appeared numerous times on the programme over the following years, so much so that when comedian Tommy Tiernan made one of his first appearances on the programme in the 1990s, he quipped "I'm delighted to be on the show, June Rodgers must be working".

Rodgers spent several years on the pantomime circuit in Ireland in the early 1990s. During this time, she, along with Eileen Reed, played the Ugly sisters in Cinderella. The comedy writers Martin Higgins and Tom Roche helped Rodgers to develop the characters for which she would become known. Around 1994, Rodgers met fellow entertainer Brenda Brooks at a show in Clontarf Castle, and the two became good friends as well as colleagues over the following decades, with Brooks guesting on some of Rodgers shows. As of 2018, Brooks was co-producing the annual June Rodgers Christmas Show.

Rodgers credits Irish comedian Brendan Grace as an influence on her style, and used to watch him perform live at cabaret shows in a pub in Terenure during the 1970s and 80s. She also credits the American actress and comedian Lucille Ball as an influence, stating "She was one of the first ballsy comedians on our screens at a time when women were portrayed as demure and ladylike". Rodgers notes that she got her sense of humour from her father.

Speaking with the Irish Farmers Journal in 2015, Rodgers revealed that she still suffered from stage fright every night before a show:

Even though you say to yourself: 'Cop on. You're going to be fine, you do it every night of the week', the nerves start kicking in (..) I just have this fear I'm going to go out and forget something.

Rodgers put on a Christmas show annually in the Red Cow Moran Hotel for 17 years until relocating to Taylors Three Rock Hotel in Ballinteer in 2018. Rodgers noted how the show contained singing, dancing, and family entertainment as well as music from the 1960s, 70s, and 80s, adding "We're actually trying to keep variety alive because there’s not a lot of raw family entertainment out there anymore."

== Health ==
In 2019, Rodgers revealed that she was left unable to work for 18 months after an incident in which a fall had cut off the blood supply down the right hand side of her body resulting in the collapse of her hip bone over time. After a successful diagnosis by a Dublin orthopaedic surgeon, she received a hip replacement. By October 2019, Rodgers reported that she was "100 per cent pain free", and ready to return to the stage.

Speaking of her future workload in late 2018, Rodgers noted:

But I had a really bad accident two years ago and it forced me to rethink a lot of things and kind of take stock, and now I only really do things that I really enjoy and the corporate stuff has kind of quietened. I'm happy to do the Joe Duffy thing (Funny Friday on Liveline) once a month, and my Christmas show because I feel like when people pay they're invested in the show. But if more comes up in the future I'm open to it, but I'm a lot more selective nowadays because of that experience.

== Personal life ==
In the mid-1990s, Rodgers met her future husband Peter Lane at one of her shows in Clontarf Castle. As part of her act, she would perform as a character who sold cheap bananas, and every night would throw a banana out to the audience. On the evening in question, Peter caught the banana. They married in September 1997.

Rodgers' and her husband possess two paintings by Irish artist/historian Peter Pearson, which were gifted to them by her father-in-law. The paintings are of Dún Laoghaire Harbour and Coal Harbour.

In a 2018 interview with The Irish Independent, Rodgers noted her appreciation for the 1993 film Mrs. Doubtfire, the television series The Supervet: Noel Fitzpatrick, singer Carole King and the architectural merits of St Patrick's Cathedral, Dublin.

The Irish former rugby union and rugby league player Ian Dowling is married to Rodger's niece.

As of 2014, she lived in Firhouse, County Dublin, in a "115-year-old cottage with a huge back garden".

== Filmography ==
- Agnes Browne (1999)
- On the Nose (2001)
- The Clinic (TV series) (Season 7) (2009)
- Mrs. Brown's Boys D'Movie (2014)
- Mrs Brown's Boys (2018, 2023, 2025)
