= Agnes Browne =

- Theatrical release poster
- Directed by: Anjelica Huston
- Screenplay by: John Goldsmith
- Based on: The Mammy by Brendan O'Carroll
- Produced by: Anjelica Huston; Jim Sheridan
- Starring: Anjelica Huston; Marion O'Dwyer; Ray Winstone; Arno Chevrier; Gerard McSorley; Tom Jones
- Cinematography: Anthony B. Richmond
- Edited by: Eva Gardos
- Music by: Paddy Moloney
- Production company: October Films
- Distributed by: USA Films (United States and Canada); Universal Pictures (through United International Pictures, select territories)
- Release dates: December 3, 1999 (Limited); March 3, 2000
- Running time: 92 minutes
- Countries: United States; Ireland
- Languages: English; French
- Box office: $148,853

Agnes Browne is a 1999 romantic comedy-drama film directed, produced by, and starring Anjelica Huston, based on the book The Mammy by Brendan O'Carroll.

== Plot ==
In 1967 in Dublin, the unexpected death of Agnes Browne's husband sends her family, consisting of seven children aged between two and fourteen, into emotional turmoil and financial crisis. She is forced to borrow money from a ruthless loan shark named Mr. Billy to make ends meet. Agnes faces her dismal existence by selling fruits and vegetables at an open-air market based in Dublin's Moore Street, where she spends time with her best friend Marion. Marion proves to be a great source of encouragement in Agnes's difficulties.

Wishing to escape her troubles, if only for a short time, Agnes dreams of finding enough money to attend an upcoming Tom Jones concert. Agnes' dream is realized when Marion secretly buys two tickets and gives them to her. Agnes also accepts the offer of a date with a French baker named Pierre, and her children pool their money together and buy her a new dress to wear on the date. Meanwhile, Marion soon discovers an ominous lump in her breast, which proves to be malignant.

Eventually the family has to face the loan shark. Mr. Billy warns Agnes that she has until Christmas to pay him back or he will strip her house of her furniture. On Christmas Day, Agnes receives a letter stating she can collect the money from the hotel where her husband worked. She holds off Mr. Billy and sends her children to the hotel, where they meet Tom Jones and tell him their story. Tom then visits Agnes in her home, helps her pay off Mr. Billy, and takes her, her children and their dog to his concert, where Jones dedicates his song "She's a Lady" to Agnes.

== Cast ==
- Anjelica Huston as Agnes Browne
- Marion O'Dwyer as Marion Monks
- Ray Winstone as Mr. Billy
- Arno Chevrier as Pierre
- Niall O'Shea as Mark Browne
- Ciaran Owens as Frankie Browne
- Roxanna Williams as Cathy Browne
- Carl Power as Simon Browne
- Mark Power as Dermot Browne
- Gareth O'Connor as Rory Browne
- James Lappin as Trevor Browne
- Tom Jones as himself
- Will Anderson as Tom Jones' stunt double
- Gerard McSorley as Mr. Aherne
- Kate O'Toole as Senior Sister Magdalen
- June Rodgers as Fat Annie
- Jennifer Gibney as Winnie the Mackerel
- Steve Mount as Tommo Monks
- Brendan O'Carroll as Seamus the Drunk
- Doreen Keogh as Mortuary Nun

== Reception ==
Agnes Browne was not well-received in the United States. On the review aggregator website Rotten Tomatoes, 41% of 27 critics' reviews are positive. Metacritic, which uses a weighted average, assigned the film a score of 55 out of 100, based on 27 critics, indicating "mixed or average" reviews.

Franz Lidz, writing in The New York Times, called it a "flimsy whimsy" and chided Roger Ebert for liking it. William Arnold felt that the ending trivialized the story, leaving the audience "with the uncomfortable feeling that we've just viewed some episode of a TV sitcom of the era." The New York Times reviewer Stephen Holden found it "nothing more than a series of homey skits loosely woven into a portrait of a working-class saint."

The film had a better reception in Europe, winning the Youth Jury Award at the 1999 San Sebastián International Film Festival. It also received a Grand Prix nomination at the Ghent International Film Festival the same year.

== Legacy ==
The Mammy was followed by two additional books: The Chiselers and The Granny. A book about Agnes Brown's early life, The Young Wan, was published later. However, these were not made into films. Brendan O'Carroll has had his own success with the Brown family in Mrs. Brown's Boys, both on the theatre stage and on television.
