= Brendan O'Carroll =

Irish actor and comedian (born 1955)

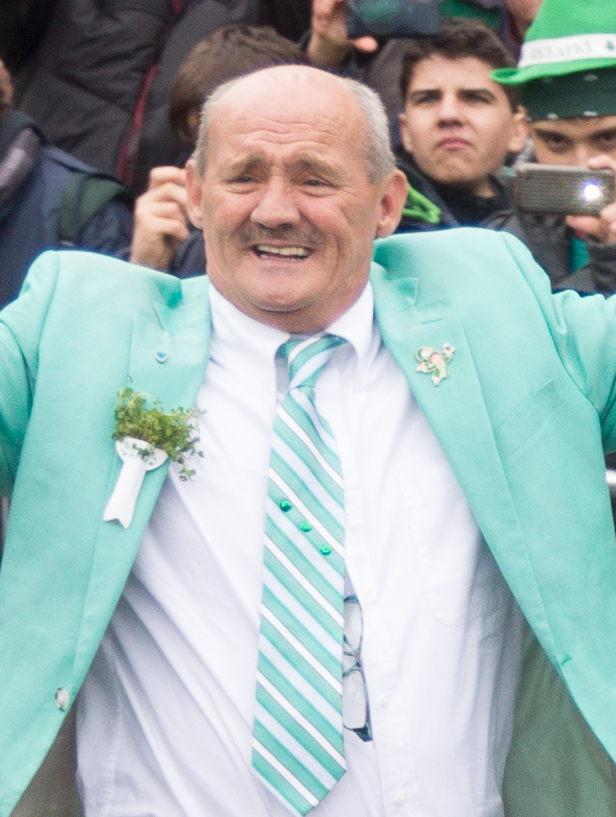
- O'Carroll in 2015
- Born: 17 September 1955 (age 71); Finglas, Dublin, Ireland
- Occupations: Actor; comedian; director; producer; writer
- Years active: 1991–present
- Known for: Agnes Brown in Mrs. Brown's Boys and All Round to Mrs. Brown's
- Spouse: Doreen Dowdall (m. 1977; div. 1999) Jennifer Gibney (m. 2005)
- Children: 4, including Fiona and Danny
- Parents: Gerard O'Carroll (father); Maureen McHugh (mother)
- Relatives: Eilish O'Carroll (sister)

Brendan O'Carroll (born 17 September 1955) is an Irish actor, comedian, director, producer and writer. He is best known for portraying foul-mouthed matriarch Agnes Brown on stage and in the BBC and RTÉ television sitcom Mrs. Brown's Boys. In 2015, O'Carroll was awarded the Irish Film and Television Academy Lifetime Achievement Award for his contribution to Irish television.

== Early life ==
Brendan O'Carroll was born on 17 September 1955, in Finglas, Dublin, the youngest of 11 children. His mother, Maureen, was a Labour Party TD and his father, Gerard O'Carroll, was a carpenter. His father died in 1962 when O'Carroll was seven, and his mother raised him and his siblings with little money. He attended Saint Gabriel's National School and left at the age of 12. He had a string of occupations, including waiter and milkman.

== Career ==
=== Early career ===
Having become well known as a comedy guest on The Late Late Show, O'Carroll released four stand-up videos titled How's your Raspberry Ripple, How's your Jolly Roger, How's your Snowballs, and How's your Wibbly Wobbly Wonder. He wrote the screenplay to Sparrow's Trap, a boxing film. The film, which had Stephen Rea cast in the lead role, ran into financing difficulties midway through the shoot when the distributor withdrew, and it was abandoned. Incurring debts of over €1 million, O'Carroll became bankrupt, and the film has never been produced. He presented a quiz show, Hot Milk and Pepper, on RTÉ One with long-term collaborator Gerry Browne.

=== Mrs. Brown's Boys ===
In 1992, O'Carroll performed a short radio play titled Mrs. Brown's Boys, and shortly afterwards he wrote four books: The Mammy, The Granny, The Chisellers, and The Scrapper. In 1999, a film named Agnes Browne, starring Anjelica Huston, was released, based on The Mammy. O'Carroll also co-wrote the screenplay. He then put together his own family theatre company, Mrs. Browne's Boys, and dressed up as a woman to play his part, as the actress he had originally hired did not show up.

From 1999 to 2010, he wrote and performed in five plays. Since 2011, the stage shows have been re-toured across the UK. In 2011, his plays were adapted into a television sitcom (with the name "Browne" shortened to "Brown"). Since 2011, 28 episodes have aired, across three series, several Christmas-specials, and a one-off live episode that aired in 2016 on RTÉ One and BBC One. Mrs. Brown's Boys D'Movie was released on 27 June 2014 and was a significant success in the UK, staying at number one in the box office for two consecutive weeks. However, the film had negative reviews, including one saying it was not just unfunny but "close to anti-funny". O'Carroll's wife, his sister Eilish, his son Danny, and his daughter Fiona all appear or have appeared on episodes of Mrs. Brown's Boys. O'Carroll also appeared as Mrs Brown in the 2022 Netflix film A Madea Homecoming.

In August 2026, O'Carroll announced that he had two jaw fractures and required "immediate surgery", and filming for that year's Mrs Brown's Boys Christmas and New Year specials was cancelled.

== Personal life ==
O'Carroll was married to Doreen Dowdall from 1977 until their divorce in 1999. They had four children; their first, Brendan Jr., died shortly after birth in 1976. The surviving children are Fiona, Danny, and Eric. In 2005, he married actress Jennifer Gibney; the couple live in Davenport, Florida, US.

O'Carroll has dyslexia, a condition also shared by his sons.

=== Family history ===
O'Carroll's paternal grandfather Peter O'Carroll, a father of seven and a prominent republican, was shot dead on 16 October 1920 at his home in Manor Street, Dublin. Two of his sons were Irish Republican Army volunteers. The incident was investigated in the television series Who Do You Think You Are? In March 2016, O'Carroll appeared in the BBC Two documentary Brendan O'Carroll – My Family at War, which explored the involvement of three of his uncles in the Easter Rising.

== Filmography ==
=== Film ===
Year	Film	Character(s)
1996	The Van	Weslie
1999	Agnes Browne	Seamus
1999	Angela's Ashes	Man in pub
2002	Mrs Brown's Boys	Agnes Brown
2003	Mrs Brown's Boys: The Last Wedding	Agnes Brown
2004	Mrs Brown's Boys: Believe It Or Not	Agnes Brown
2005	Good Mourning Mrs Brown	Agnes Brown
2006	Mrs Brown's Boys: Triple Trouble	Agnes Brown
2007	How Now Mrs. Brown	Agnes Brown
2008	Mrs Brown's Boys: The Seven Year Itch	Agnes Brown
2014	Mrs. Brown's Boys D'Movie	Agnes Brown and Mr. Wang
2022	A Madea Homecoming	Agnes Brown

=== Television ===
Year	Title	Role
1996–1998	Brendan O'Carroll's Hot Milk and Pepper	Host
2004	Max and Paddy's Road to Nowhere	Gypsy Joe
2009	The Fattest Man in Britain	Fr O'Flaherty
2011–present	Mrs. Brown's Boys	Agnes Brown
2013	The Security Men	Jimmy
2014	Who Do You Think You Are?	Himself: Series 11, Episode 4
2017–2020	All Round to Mrs. Brown's	Agnes Brown
2018	For Facts Sake	Host
2022	The Walk-In	Uncle Ronnie
2026	Shedites	Jimmy

=== Stage ===
Year	Title	Role
1999–2000, 2004, 2006, 2011–2012	Mrs Brown's Last Wedding	Agnes Brown
2002–2003, 2011, 2017	Good Mourning Mrs Brown	Agnes Brown
2004–2005, 2012, 2023–2024	Mrs Brown Rides Again	Agnes Brown
2007, 2013–2014, 2018	For The Love of Mrs Brown	Agnes Brown
2009–2010, 2015	How Now Mrs Brown Cow	Agnes Brown
2019	D'Musical	Agnes Brown
2021–2022, 2024	D'Live Show	Agnes Brown
