= Mrs. Brown's Boys D'Movie =

2014 film directed by Ben Kellett

- Theatrical release poster
- Directed by: Ben Kellett
- Screenplay by: Brendan O'Carroll
- Based on: Mrs. Brown's Boys by Brendan O'Carroll
- Produced by: Stephen McCrum; Brendan O'Carroll
- Starring: Brendan O'Carroll; Jennifer Gibney; Rory Cowan; Danny O’Carroll; Amanda Woods; Fiona O’Carroll; Paddy Houlihan; Eilish O'Carroll; Dermot O’Neill; Martin Delany; Pat ‘Pepsi’ Shields; Gary Hollywood; Robert Bathurst; Dermot Crowley; Simon Delaney
- Cinematography: Martin Hawkins
- Edited by: Mark Lawrence
- Music by: Andy O'Callaghan
- Production companies: Universal Pictures; BBC Films; BocFlix; That's Nice Films; Penalty Kick Films
- Distributed by: Universal Pictures
- Release date: 27 June 2014
- Running time: 94 minutes
- Countries: Ireland; United Kingdom
- Language: English
- Budget: £3.6 million
- Box office: £22.6 million

Mrs. Brown's Boys D'Movie is a 2014 comedy film based on the sitcom Mrs. Brown's Boys and is co-produced by That's Nice Films, Penalty Kick Films, RTÉ and BocFlix. BBC Films is acting as sales agent and it was distributed by Universal Pictures. It was written by series creator (and company director of both That's Nice Films and Bocflix) Brendan O'Carroll, who also plays the lead role. The film sees Agnes Brown go to court to protect her family's stall at Dublin's Moore Street market from a corrupt Russian businessman who wishes to convert it into a shopping centre. The film was released on 27 June to negative reviews from critics. It topped the UK and Ireland box office with £4.3 million in its opening weekend, on a budget of £3.6 million, and retained the top spot for a second week. On 27 October it was released on home media, again topping the charts.

== Plot ==
Agnes Brown (Brendan O'Carroll) is an independent market trader, selling fruit and vegetables on Dublin's Moore Street market. It has been under attack from P.R. Irwin (Dermot Crowley), a TD (PRIC) who is in an arrangement with a ruthless Russian businessman who wants to put all the market stalls out of business and open a shopping centre on the site. Her stall is the next to be targeted, being sent a bill for unpaid tax left by her grandmother, and a man (working for Irwin) appears offering to buy her stall and make the bill disappear. Agnes nearly accepts, but Winnie (Eilish O'Carroll) reveals this news to the locals, forcing Agnes into defending her stall from the developers while they look for ideas on how to raise the money. Agnes' friend Philomena Nine Warts informs her that her grandmother, Mary Moccasin, was next to Agnes' grandmother at the tax office when she paid the bill and therefore no money is owed. Unfortunately, Philomena's grandmother is hit by a bus on the way to the courtroom before she can testify.

Agnes' court case attracts a lot of attention from the media, portraying her as the greatest mother in Ireland. This leads her to go to confession, where she admits (unknowingly also to a Russian mobster) that she briefly put her children in care when her husband died, but continued to claim the child support money. This is used against her in the witness box during questioning by Irwin in court (Irwin being the opposing Barrister), and she runs out in shame. Eventually being found by the river by her daughter Cathy (Jennifer Gibney), she admits all in a tearful moment on the Ha'penny Bridge, telling her how she told the nuns that she thought she could look after two of the six children, but when asked to pick she was unable to.

Meanwhile, Agnes' son Dermot (Paddy Houlihan) and his lifelong criminal best friend Buster Brady (Danny O'Carroll) try to get the receipt. After failing to break into the restricted area of the NRS they recruit a troop of blind trainee ninjas, led by Mr. Wang (also played by Brendan O'Carroll). The Russians have already found and destroyed the original receipt, but Buster and Dermot learn that the receptionist who took the payment was blind, so there exists a braille version of the receipt. They find it and let Agnes know, telling her Tourettes-suffering barrister (Robert Bathurst) to stall the case. After navigating air ducts out of the NRS, Agnes, Buster and Dermot are chased by the mobsters and the Garda, jumping in the River Liffey. Agnes separates from the pair and returns with the "receipt" but it turns out Buster accidentally gave her a betting slip instead. At this point, Cathy stands up and gives a speech on how special Moore Street and its market is, and her intention to run her mother's stall when her time comes, to Agnes' joy. After their pursuit continues in a Nissan Navara and finally a dash on a stolen horse, Buster and Dermot deliver the receipt to the courtroom just in time to have the case against Agnes dropped. They all celebrate by dancing on the steps of the courtroom.

== Cast ==
- Brendan O'Carroll as Agnes Brown and Mr. Wang
- Jennifer Gibney as Cathy Brown
- Rory Cowan as Rory Brown
- Danny O'Carroll as Buster Brady
- Amanda Woods as Betty Brown
- Fiona O'Carroll as Maria Brown
- Paddy Houlihan as Dermot Brown
- Eilish O'Carroll as Winnie McGoogan
- Dermot O'Neill as Harold "Grandad" Brown
- Martin Delany as Trevor Brown
- Pat ‘Pepsi’ Shields as Mark Brown
- Gary Hollywood as Dino Doyle
- Robert Bathurst as Maydo Archer SC
- Dermot Crowley as P.R. Irwin SC
- Simon Delaney as Tom Crews
- Fiona Gibney as Sharon McGoogan
- Conor Moloney as Father Damien
- Emily Regan as Barbara
- Jamie O'Carroll as Bono Brown (Cameo)
- Nick Nevern as Gregor
- Eamonn Holmes as Lee
- Chris Patrick-Simpson as Ninja Joe
- Keith Duffy as John
- Frank Kelly as Justice Cannon
- Eamonn Holmes as himself
- Sorcha Cusack as Justice Dickie
- June Rodgers as Fat Annie McCrum
- Joe Duffy as himself
- Mark Coney as Clerk of the Court
- Maire Hastings as Philomena Nine Warts
- Helen Spain as Maggie May
- Raj Ghatak as Rab Patel
- Laurie Morton as Mary Moccasin
- Jim Gibney as Father McBride (Credited as James Gibney)

== Production ==
In September 2012 it was reported that an estimated £3.6 million deal was in place with Universal Studios to start production on the film version of Mrs. Brown's Boys. A spokesman for O'Carroll said that the film would have a distinctly Dublin flavour, "It's Dublin humour so you're going to need Dublin actors and technicians to get it right for the big screen." Despite funding being secured, O'Carroll later confirmed that a script had not been written prior to the deal. "I haven't written it yet. That's what success does, they give you money and say 'Whatever you think'. So I've taken the money!". At the 2013 National Television Awards O'Carroll confirmed the film had been written and would begin shooting the following autumn.

Principal photography began in September 2013 in Dublin. Filming locations included Moore Street, Dublin quays, Dublin Institute of Technology, Father Matthew Square, The Customs House and Wimbledon Studios. Filming was completed on 25 October 2013.

The Script recorded a song for the film called "Hail, Rain or Sunshine".

== Release ==
The film had its world premiere on 25 June 2014 at the Savoy Cinema in Dublin, with Brendan O'Carroll and the rest of the cast in attendance.

The distributors of the film did not screen the film for critics in advance of its release.

== Reception ==
=== Box office ===
The film earned £4.3 million in the UK and Ireland in its opening weekend, breaking records in Ireland for the highest box office gross on the opening day of an Irish-made film. It was top of the UK and Ireland box office in this opening weekend, ahead of The Fault in Our Stars which took £1.7 million. It maintained its No. 1 spot for a second week, in which it grossed another £2.1 million, the only film to pass £1 million that week. For its third week, it took £1.08 million, but fell to third behind Transformers: Age of Extinction and How to Train Your Dragon 2.

With a total gross of £14.7 million, it was the third highest grossing British or Irish film in the domestic market in 2014, behind The Inbetweeners 2 and Paddington.

=== Critical response ===
The film was panned by critics. On Rotten Tomatoes it has an approval rating of 11% based on reviews from 18 critics.

Mike McCahill of The Guardian gave the film 1 star out of 5 and called it "a flatly indifferent cash-in". He predicted that although the devoted fanbase of the sitcom would make it as much of a commercial success as The Inbetweeners Movie, it did not deserve to be. In The Daily Telegraph, writer Robbie Collin also gave the film 1 star out of 5. He was highly critical of the Chinese character Mr Wang, played by O'Carroll "with his eyes narrowed and Ls and Rs switched, while making little karate-choppy motions in the air with his hands", calling it "something close to anti-funny". He also said that the sitcom's inclusion of bloopers and characters breaking the fourth wall didn't translate to the format of cinema without "very clever lateral thinking", which the film lacked. Donald Clarke of The Irish Times called the film "overstretched, underwritten, sluggishly paced and unsettled by the discombobulating move from studio to location" and concluded, "the gags are clunky, the dialogue is leaden and the story is threadbare." Another 1-star review came from Empire, who remarked: "almost avant-garde in its commitment to unfunny, it's shambolically performed by the majority of its cast, and shot and edited in a fashion so slapdash it seems like a movie made almost entirely by competition winners." Stephen Kelly of Total Film also gave the film 1 star out of 5 and said that it will "leave even the most fervent of fans disappointed by its abattoir of wit" because "while the TV show possesses a warm, ramshackle appeal, this story of granny Agnes Brown trying to save a Dublin market from d'foreigners (boo!) is not only out of its comfort zone, but full of cold, mean-spirited gags about the blind, an Indian man everyone thinks is Jamaican (um, LOL?) and [a] Chinese caricature so dazzlingly racist it beggars belief."

Mark Kermode gave the film a scathing review, calling it "an absolute stinker" and "not funny on any level, at all", saying that: "it's good that the cast [laugh at themselves in the bloopers] because were it not for the cast laughing at the jokes, there wouldn't be anybody laughing in the cinema... there are no laughs. None. Nul points. Nil." Archie Bland of The Independent said that he "couldn't argue" with actor Rory Cowan who said that the views of critics were "totally irrelevant", but still found the film "dreadful... slow, sentimental, and altogether cynical", saying that "I'm afraid I can't say I laughed, or even smiled, once in the whole godforsaken 93 minutes." He concluded by saying that "I don't see why anyone is obliged to like [the film] just because it does well at the box office... In any case, it doesn't really matter. It is now absolutely clear that Mrs Brown is a slating-proof juggernaut."

In one of the few positive reviews, James Ward of the Daily Mirror gave the film 4 stars out of 5. Though Ward enjoyed the 1970s-inspired politically incorrect humour, he noted that some moments caused him to wince rather than laugh, saying the ninja character "makes Benny Hill's Chinaman seem sensitive and respectful". Ward concludes: "Old-fashioned? Undoubtedly. Crude? Definitely. Funny? Well, we know what the critics with their box sets of Curb Your Enthusiasm will say [...] For the critics D'Movie may be a D'Isaster – but for the rest of us it's a D'Light".

== Sequel ==
Brendan O'Carroll announced there would be a sequel to D'Movie at the National Television Awards in January 2014, whilst speaking to the Radio Times, O'Carroll said "We're already working on a sequel – Mrs Brown's Boys D'Movie 2". In December 2015 it was confirmed that there will be a sequel. In August 2016 Brendan O'Carroll told The Sun that the sequel had been delayed because of Brexit. 'We were planning to do it this year but the numbers weren't right' said O'Carroll. 'The Brexit Drop in sterling makes it a lot more expensive for the studio than it would have been previously.' In December 2018, it was confirmed that O'Carroll would be writing a sequel with his son Danny, who plays Buster. The plot will revolve around the relationship between Buster and Dermot. 'I think it's going to be really, really successful' O'Carroll said of film and compared the chemistry between Buster and Dermot to that of Morecambe and Wise.

== Possible spin-offs ==
On 20 June 2014, O'Carroll announced that he was working on two spin-off feature films following on from Mrs. Brown's Boys D'Movie. The first spin-off film is to be entitled Wash and Blow if it is produced and it will see O'Carroll take on the role of salon owner, Mario, alongside Rory Brown and Dino Doyle. The second spin-off film in development is to be entitled Mr Wang, who is a character introduced in D'Movie. It was confirmed that English actor Burt Kwouk, who later died in 2016, had been asked to take the title role but was unable to travel to Dublin, so O'Carroll will take on the role himself if the film gets produced. It will also co-star Buster Brady and Dermot Brown working for him under a detective agency. It is currently not known if the spin-off films will be made.

== Home media ==
Mrs. Brown's Boys D'Movie was released on DVD and Blu-ray in the UK and Ireland on 27 October 2014. Within the first week of release in the UK, the film sold 315,981 units across DVD, Blu-ray and digital downloads, topping the home entertainment charts with nearly twice as many sold as second-placed Godzilla. O'Carroll said "I'm always surprised, to this day, about how much people love the show and have embraced it into their lives and their homes. We never take it for granted and always just aim to make the audience and fans laugh out loud in everything we do."

== See also ==
- List of 2014 box office number-one films in the United Kingdom
- Madea
