= Tubridy Tonight season 5 =

Season of television series

The fifth and final season of Tubridy Tonight commenced airing on 27 September 2008 and completed broadcasting on 30 May 2009. The series, hosted by Ryan Tubridy, aired on RTÉ One on Saturdays nights following the RTÉ News: Nine O'Clock. At the end of this series, Tubridy took over from Pat Kenny as host of The Late Late Show on Friday nights on the same channel.

Musical guests throughout the series included Fall Out Boy, The Saturdays, Sugababes, Gabriella Cilmi, Take That, The Script, Lady GaGa, Petula Clark, Bell X1, The Blizzards, Dolores O'Riordan, Boyzone, Melody Gardot and Spandau Ballet.

This series featured a new set, retaining its traditional library theme but updated for the 21st century. The opening episode featured Aidan and Marian Quinn, who spoke of their film 32A, and actresses Charlene McKenna and Shelley Conn who spoke of their parts in Raw. Don Baker also spoke of his time on Fáilte Towers, whilst there were comedic and musical performances from Oliver Callan and Fujiya & Miyagi respectively.

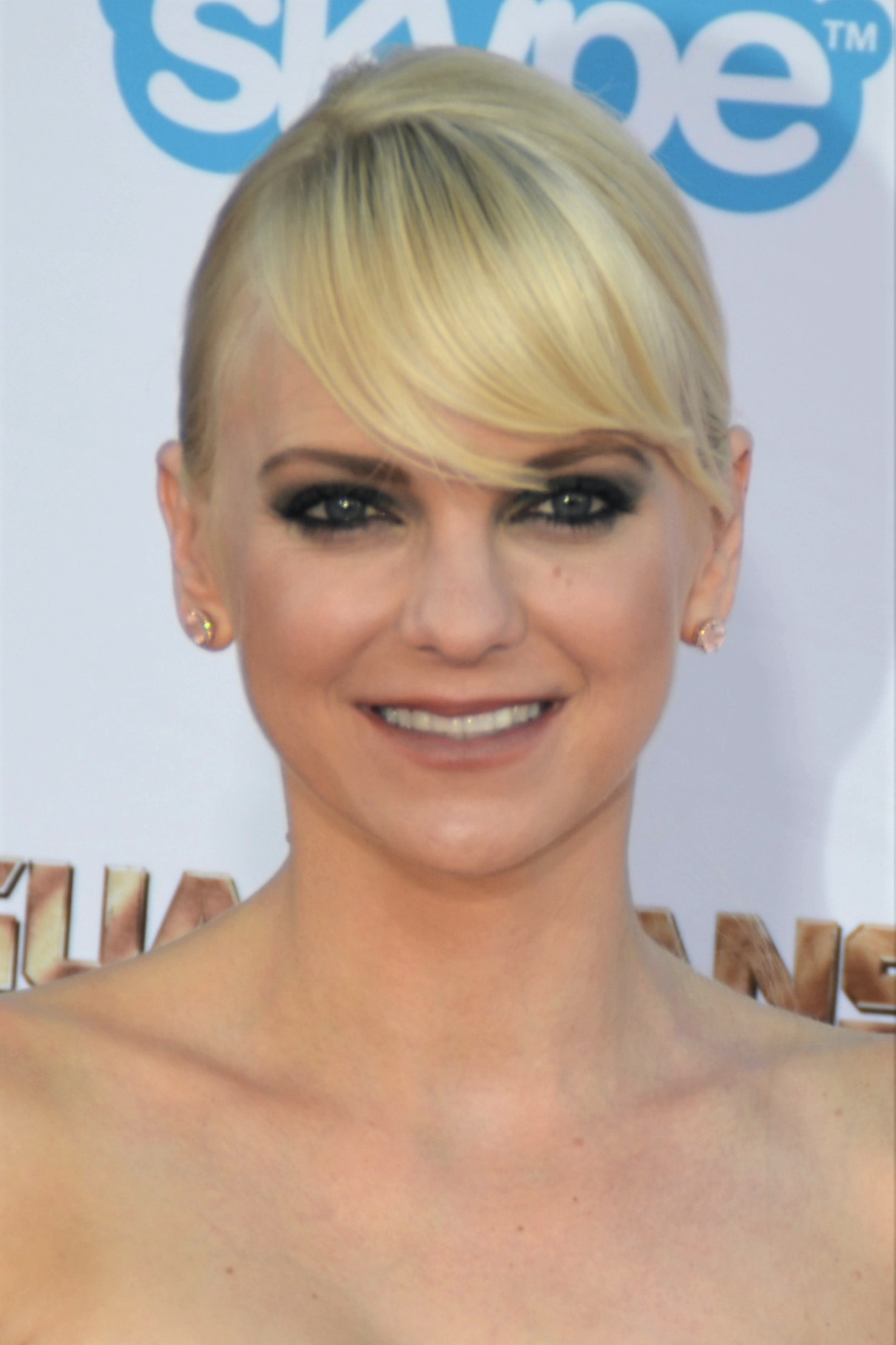
Actress Anna Faris was interviewed on the second episode of the season.

The second episode featured the Seoige sisters, Gráinne and Síle, who were about to launch their new television series, Seoige. Also appearing were actress Anna Faris to talk about her film, The House Bunny, and Peaches Geldof who was quizzed on how her father Bob reacted to her Las Vegas wedding. The third episode featured the three times Eurovision winner Johnny Logan, author Jackie Collins, comedian Paddy Courtney, and model and wife of Claudine Palmer, Robbie Keane. Tubridy was said to be hoping that Collins would "spill the beans on the excesses of Tinseltown's glory days".

Guests on the fourth episode included At Your Service hoteliers Francis and John Brennan and actor Michael Fassbender who Tubridy described as "a really talented Irish actor and his performance in the new Bobby Sands film Hunger is fantastic, there are definitely big things in store for him". Before his appearance on the fifth episode, Tubridy described Mike Murphy as "one of my all-time heroes" and "an Irish broadcasting legend". Tubridy also described himself as a fan of the Eoin Colfer novel series, Artemis Fowl, and Sugababes song "Girls" before the writer and band both appeared on episode six.

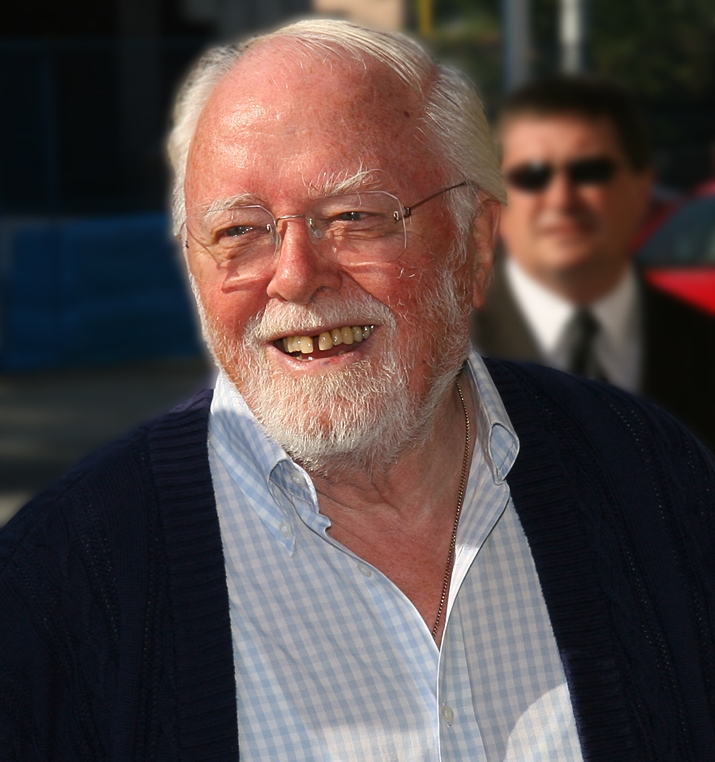
Director Richard Attenborough was interviewed in this season's seventh episode.

The seventh episode featured director Richard Attenborough, Desperate Housewives' actor Dougray Scott and Irish television personalities Zig and Zag, whose last television appearance was on 1990s chat show Kenny Live and who referred to Tubridy as "Twiggery" throughout. In the ninth episode, golfer Pádraig Harrington granted his first major television interview since winning both the year's British Open and PGA Championship. Also appearing in this edition were television presenters Eamonn Holmes and Ruth Langsford, as well as actor John Slattery from Mad Men, Desperate Housewives, Sex & the City and Will & Grace. Comedian Dara Ó Briain, rugby union players Anthony Foley and Peter Stringer and actor Aidan Gillen (The Wire) featured in the tenth episode.

Stylist Gok Wan was interviewed in the eleventh episode, which also featured reformed British boyband Take That - the show was inundated with audience ticket requests by fans of the band when it was announced they would be appearing. The Script flew in especially to appear on the thirteenth episode.

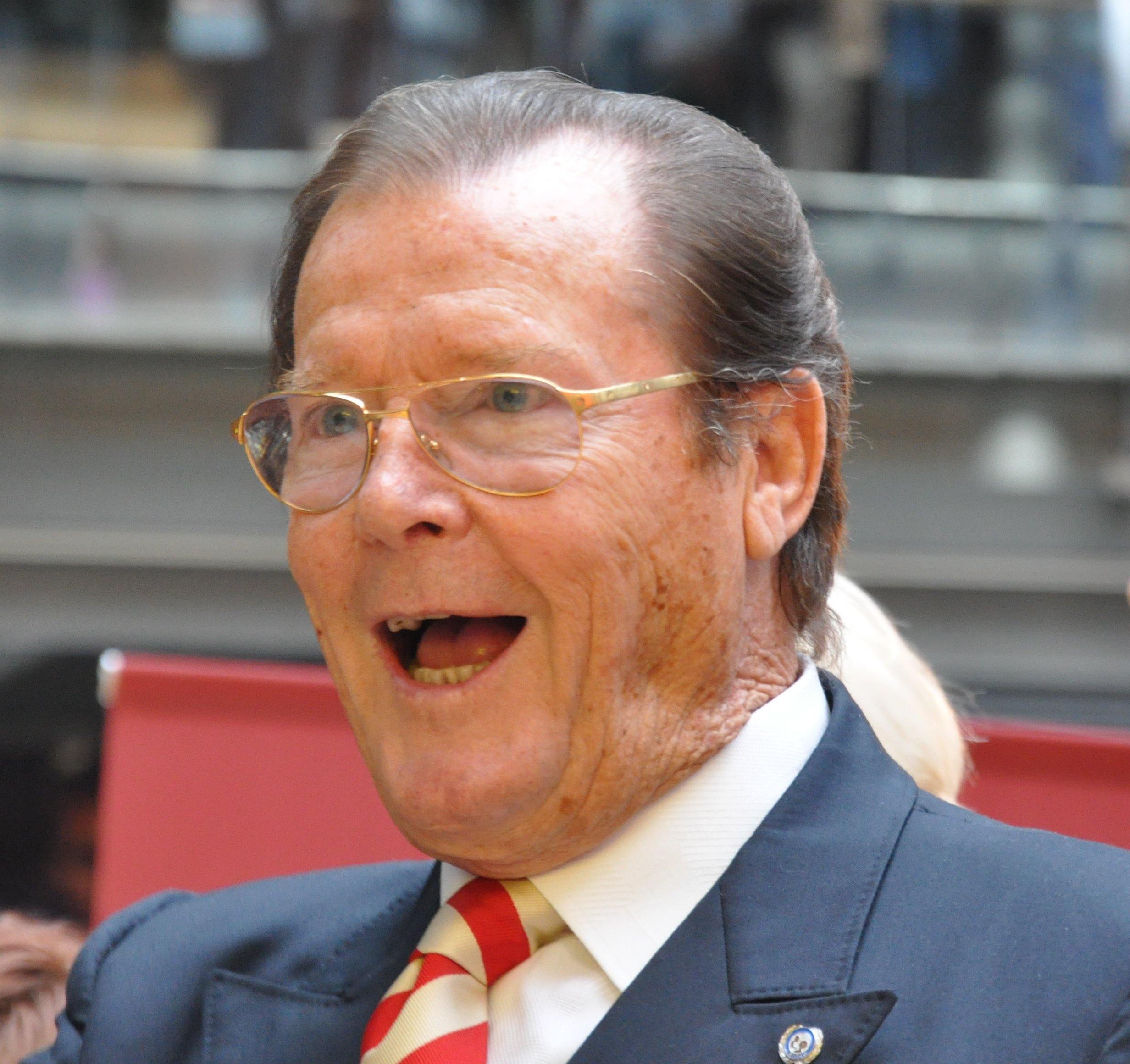
Actor Roger Moore was interviewed during the sixteenth episode of this season.

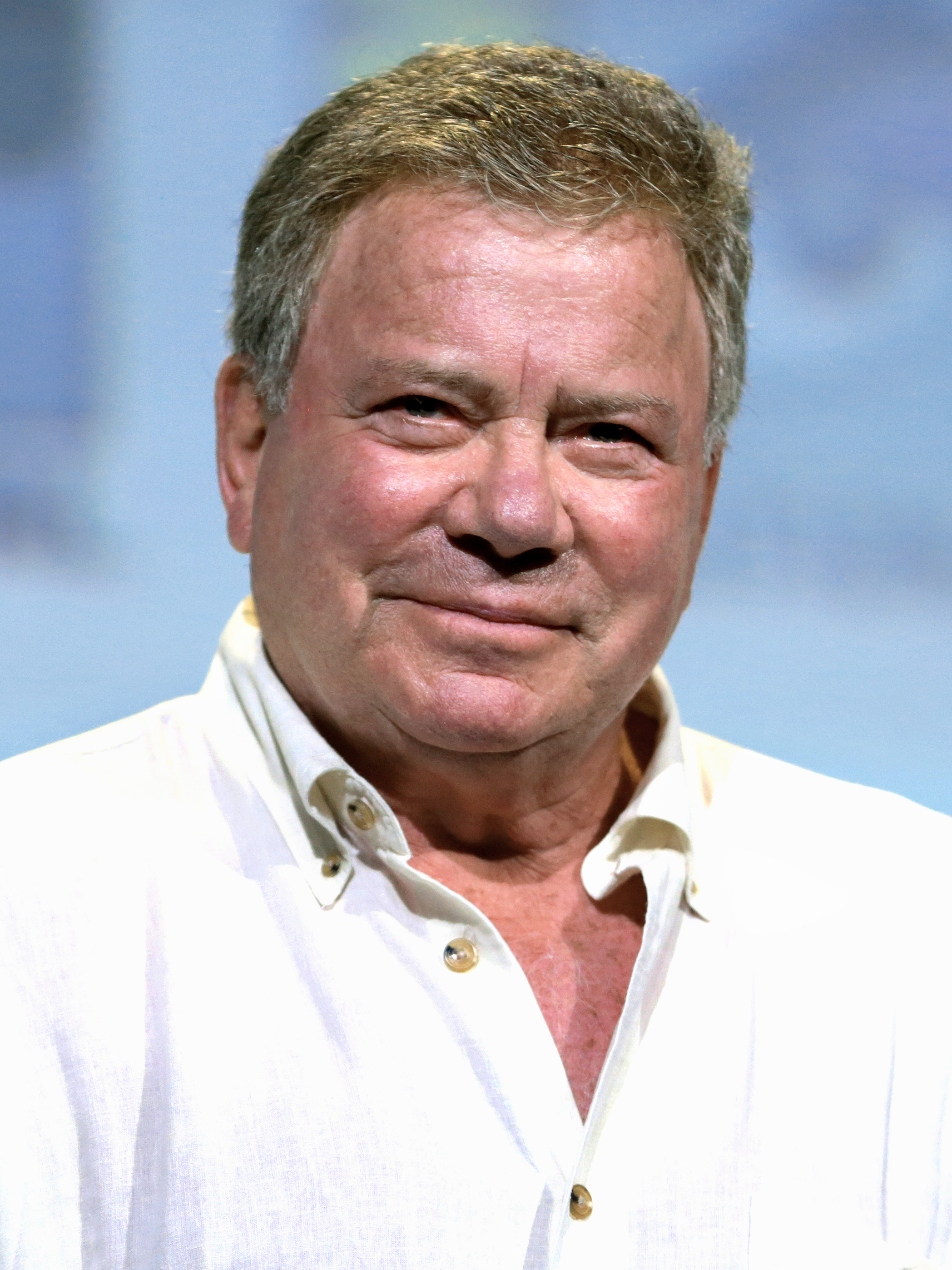
Actor and novelist William Shatner was interviewed in the eighteenth episode of the season.

The fifteenth episode was also the first of 2009 and featured Tom Chambers, Craig Revel Horwood and Bruno Tonioli from the BBC's Strictly Come Dancing and Mark Hamilton from RTÉ's How Long Will You Live? series. Actor Roger Moore was a guest on the sixteenth edition of the fifth series, with Tubridy commenting beforehand that he was "a huge Bond fan and... ...loved all his 007 performances". Moore spoke about his acting career as well as his time spent as an ambassador with UNICEF, whilst fellow guest Maura Derrane spoke of her role presenting the TG4 television series Feirme Factor. The eighteenth edition featured actor William Shatner who discussed his roles on Star Trek and Boston Legal, and La Toya Jackson who spoke of her time spent on the UK television series Big Brother.

The nineteenth episode featured Teens in the Wild presenter David Coleman, singer Petula Clark and Mark Pollock, the first blind man to reach the South Pole. Tubridy commented on his love of 1960s music beforehand, citing Clark's song "Downtown" as one of his favourite songs from that decade. Tubridy interviewed Northern Irish actors Liam Neeson and James Nesbitt about their film, Five Minutes of Heaven, in the twentieth episode of the season, describing them as " two of our [Ireland's] finest acting exports". Neeson appeared on the show less than a month before the death of his wife Natasha Richardson in a skiing accident, which he did not speak of for over two months. Also interviewed in that episode were rugby union television analysts George Hook and Brent Pope, with music provided by Bell X1. Guests on the twenty-first episode were ER actress Maura Tierney, boxer Bernard Dunne and music from The Blizzards.

The twenty-second episode featured The Clinic actress Amy Huberman, celebrity chef Kevin Dundon, comedian Paddy Courtney, Dara Ó Cinnéide and Aoibhinn Ní Shúilleabháin, as well as George Karellas, who was campaigning to win a job as caretaker of a tropical island near Australia. Guests on the twenty-third episode included jockey Ruby Walsh and veteran broadcaster David Attenborough, who Tubridy described as "one of my all time heroes", saying he had grown up watching his nature programmes. Tubridy spoke of his love for Welsh actor Michael Sheen before he appeared on the twenty-fourth episode of the season to discuss The Damned United. George Lee also appeared to discuss his documentary How We Blew the Boom and winners of The All Ireland Talent Show, the Mulkerrin Brothers, featured alongside the winning judge, Daithí Ó Sé.

Boxer Bernard Dunne returned to the show in the twenty-fifth episode after becoming a World Champion. Also guests on this show were TV presenter Holly Willoughby, who spoke of her pregnancy and Dancing on Ice, and comedian Brendan O'Carroll who spoke about his stage show, For the Love of Mrs Brown, with music provided by singer Brian Kennedy. Guests on the twenty-sixth edition were comedian Pat Shortt, television presenter Lorraine Keane and journalist and author Paul Howard, whose Ross O'Carroll-Kelly series Tubridy is a fan of. Keane was appearing less than three weeks before she parted company with TV3 and her Xposé show.

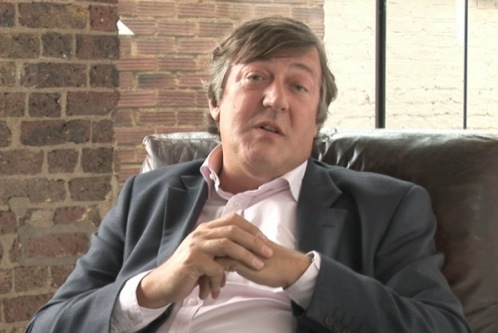
Stephen Fry featured in the thirtieth episode of the season.

The twenty-eighth episode featured Erin O'Connor and model agent Fiona Ellis, who were promoting their television series The Model Agent, whilst a panel of Adam Brophy, Sinéad Moriarty and Dermot Whelan discussed parenthood. Former English association footballer Paul Gascoigne appeared on the twenty-ninth edition of the season to discuss the Channel 4 documentary Saving Gazza, with other guests being the celebrity chef Richard Corrigan, who was promoting his television series Corrigan's City Farm and musician Dolores O'Riordan who discussed her latest album. The thirtieth episode featured Stephen Fry ("always interesting" - Tubridy), boy band Boyzone ("great craic"), British television presenter Fern Britton ("as much of a giggle on our show as she is on This Morning") and Irish comedy duo Jason Byrne and PJ Gallagher ("pure entertainment").

Celebrity Bainisteoir season 2 finalists Derek Davis and Katherine Lynch, actor Colm Meaney, Robson Green and Gift Grub's Mario Rosenstock were guests on the thirty-first episode, with music provided by jazz singer Melody Gardot. Tubridy was joined by Spandau Ballet, Adam Carroll and television presenting couple, Marty Whelan and Mary Kennedy, on the thirty-second edition of the season. Tubridy said he was "delighted" that Spandau Ballet agreed to appear with "80s nostalgia now [being] bigger than ever". The final episode saw the return of one of the more memorable Tubridy Tonight guests, David Hasselhoff. RTÉ later reported viewing figures of 854,000, with 518,000 tuning in at one peak point.

Episode #	Date	Guests	Musical performance	Remarks
5.1	27 September 2008	Aidan and Marian Quinn / Don Baker / Charlene McKenna and Shelley Conn / Oliver Callan	"Knickerbocker" by Fujiya & Miyagi	Season opener
5.2	4 October 2008	Gráinne and Síle Seoige, Peaches Geldof, Craig Doyle, Anna Faris	"Stop, I Don't Love You Anymore" by Sharleen Spiteri	—
5.3	11 October 2008	Johnny Logan / Jackie Collins / Paddy Courtney / Claudine Palmer		—
5.4	18 October 2008	Francis and John Brennan / Michelle Heaton / Father Brian D'Arcy / Michael Fassbender	"I Don't Care" by Fall Out Boy	—
5.5	25 October 2008	Mike Murphy / Mary Black / Neven Maguire	"Up" by The Saturdays	—
5.6	1 November 2008	Loyd Grossman / Eoin Colfer / Seán Gallagher, Gavin Duffy and Sarah Newman	"Girls" by Sugababes	—
5.7	8 November 2008	Henry Healy (Barack Obama's ninth cousin) / Richard Attenborough / Mario Rosenstock (as Roy Keane) / Zig and Zag / Dougray Scott	by Stereophonics	—
5.8	15 November 2008	Gay Byrne / Colm & Jim-Jim		—
5.9	22 November 2008	John Slattery / Pádraig Harrington / Eamonn Holmes and Ruth Langsford / Jason Byrne	"Sweet About Me" by Gabriella Cilmi	Pádraig Harrington granted his first major television interview since winning both the year's British Open and PGA Championship.
5.10	29 November 2008	Dara Ó Briain / Anthony Foley and Peter Stringer / Aidan Gillen		—
5.11	6 December 2008	Brendan Grace / Take That / Gok Wan	"Greatest Day" by Take That	—
5.12	13 December 2008	Hector Ó hEochagáin / Mary Robinson feat. Dustin the Turkey / John Spillane feat. Hector		—
5.13	20 December 2008	Brendan O'Carroll / Charlie Brooks / Amanda Byram / Neil Delamere	The Script / Finbar Furey	—
5.14	31 December 2008	Leo Sayer Kenny Egan and Katie Taylor / Dustin the Turkey / Liz O'Kane, Brendan O'Connor and George Hook	Leo Sayer	This New Year's Eve special edition was broadcast on a Wednesday night.
5.15	10 January 2009	Tom Chambers, Craig Revel Horwood and Bruno Tonioli (Strictly Come Dancing) / Mark Hamilton / Amanda Brunker / Duncan Bannatyne (Dragons' Den)		—
5.16	17 January 2009	Roger Moore / Michael English / Maura Derrane		—
5.17	24 January 2009	Alice O'Sullivan and Aoife Kelly (1st and 49th Roses of Tralee) / Naked Cowboy	Naked Cowboy	—
5.18	31 January 2009	William Shatner / La Toya Jackson / Cathy Kelly	"Just Dance" by Lady GaGa	—
5.19	7 February 2009	Petula Clark / David Coleman (Teens in the Wild) / Mark Pollock	Petula Clark	—
5.20	21 February 2009	Liam Neeson and James Nesbitt / George Hook and Brent Pope	"The Great Defector" by Bell X1	—
5.21	28 February 2009	Maura Tierney / Bernard Dunne, ~~Kenny Egan and Katie Taylor~~	"Postcards" by The Blizzards	—
5.22	7 March 2009.	Amy Huberman / Kevin Dundon / Dara Ó Cinnéide / Aoibhinn Ní Shúilleabháin / Paddy Courtney / George Karellas		—
5.23	14 March 2009	Ruby Walsh / David Attenborough / Franc (Brides of Franc)	Sandy Kelly	—
5.24	21 March 2009	Michael Sheen / George Lee / Mulkerrin Brothers and Daithí Ó Sé	"Good One" by Fred	—
5.25	28 March 2009	Bernard Dunne / Holly Willoughby / Brendan O'Carroll	Brian Kennedy	—
5.26	4 April 2009	Pat Shortt / Paul Howard / Lorraine Keane		—
5.27	11 April 2009	Brian Kerr / Angie Best / Paul Williams		—
5.28	18 April 2009	Erin O'Connor and Fiona Ellis (The Model Agent) / Chris de Burgh / Adam Brophy, Sinéad Moriarty, Dermot Whelan (panellists for discussion on parenthood)		—
5.29	25 April 2009	Paul Gascoigne / Richard Corrigan / Dolores O'Riordan		—
5.30	2 May 2009	Fern Britton / Stephen Fry / Jason Byrne and PJ Gallagher	Boyzone	—
5.31	9 May 2009	Derek Davis and Katherine Lynch (Celebrity Bainisteoir) / Mario Rosenstock / Colm Meaney / Robson Green	Melody Gardot	—
5.32	23 May 2009	Henry Winkler / Adam Carroll / Mary Kennedy and Marty Whelan / Spandau Ballet	"Gold" by Spandau Ballet	Spandau Ballet performed on Irish television for the first time since reforming in March 2009.
5.33	30 May 2009	David Hasselhoff / Kian Egan and Jodi Albert / Dana Delany / Des Bishop / Marian Keyes		Egan and Albert gave their first television interview since their marriage.

Note: There were no shows on 14 February 2009 and 16 May 2009 due to the Irish Film and Television Awards (IFTAs) and the Eurovision Song Contest respectively.
