= Celebrity Bainisteoir season 2 =

The second season of Celebrity Bainisteoir was broadcast in Ireland on RTÉ One from 22 March 2009 until 10 May 2009.

The eight bainisteoirí were model Andrea Roche, veteran broadcaster Derek Davis, former Irish pop star-turned children's television presenter Emma O'Driscoll, journalist and broadcaster George Hook, businessman-turned television presenter John McGuire, The Irish Times columnist and campaigner for male issues John Waters, comedian Katherine Lynch and Today FM broadcaster Ray D'Arcy.

The Roscommon Herald commented that the premise ought not to work, that it was in theory "eight GAA club teams being led into a phony war by a neophyte coach, expected to hit peak fitness levels three or four months ahead of their championship season".

Davis and Lynch reached the final, appearing on Tubridy Tonight the day before it was broadcast.

== Bainisteoirí ==
Eight bainisteoirí competed in the second season Celebrity Bainisteoir.

=== Ray D'Arcy ===
Ray D'Arcy is a radio and television presenter, currently being heard on The Ray D'Arcy Show on Today FM. He praised his players on the show, describing them as "lovely people" and jokingly asked his listeners if they had "any inside information on the good players in Rathangan to contact the radio show".

=== Derek Davis ===
Derek Davis has been a broadcaster with ABC, BBC Northern Ireland and RTÉ.

=== George Hook ===
George Hook is a journalist, broadcaster and rugby union pundit.

=== Katherine Lynch ===
Katherine Lynch is a comedian and television personality.

=== John McGuire ===
John McGuire is a businessman who turned into a television presenter.

=== Emma O'Driscoll ===
Emma O'Driscoll is a former pop star, turned children's television presenter and reality television personality.

=== Andrea Roche ===
Andrea Roche is a model. She admitted not being overly familiar with the game before she took part in the show. Roche rejected invitations to take part in previous reality television shows as "some of them humiliated the contestants" and she "didn't see the point", but believed Celebrity Bainisteoir was "a reality show with meaning".

=== John Waters ===
John Waters is a columnist with The Irish Times and campaigner on male issues.

== Tournament ==
The first episode was broadcast on 22 March 2009 and featured the quarter-final draw and focused on the reactions of the individual teams upon discovering the identity of their bainisteoir. The second episode was broadcast on 29 March 2009 and featured the first quarter-final between Rathangan, managed by Ray D'Arcy, and Glasdrumman, managed by Derek Davis. D'Arcy's preparations for the match include bringing his players to a bootcamp, whilst Davis invites television chef Derry Clarke for a cookery session with his team. The third episode was broadcast on 5 April 2009 and featured the quarter-final between St Michael's, managed by John Waters, and Rockwell Rovers, managed by Andrea Roche. Their approaches to training their teams are very different; Roche brings her team to a farm and invites some of them to one of her magazine photo shoots, whilst Waters encounters difficulty in simply communicating with his own team. The fourth episode was broadcast on 12 April 2009 and featured the quarter-final between Cuala, managed by George Hook, and St Patrick's Dromahair, managed by Katherine Lynch. After having difficulty adjusting to wearing a tracksuit for training, Lynch massages her team and then embarks on a campaign to have as many people from Leitrim as possible attend the game. Hook uses his experience as a rugby union coach to train his team. The fifth episode was broadcast on 19 April 2009 featured the final quarter-final between St Patrick's, managed by Emma O'Driscoll, and Sneem, managed by John McGuire. McGuire resides in Kerry near his team for their training sessions, whilst O'Driscoll uses her experiences from her time in Six to help record a song with her team, "Here Come the Boys".

The sixth episode was broadcast 26 April 2009 and featured the first semi-final, contested by O'Driscoll's St Patrick's team and Davis's Glasdrumman. O'Driscoll brings her team to Limerick's Saint Patrick's Day parade where she is acting as Grand Marshal and also takes them to Bunratty Castle where she used to perform as a dancer. Davis brings his team to Croke Park where they meet Paddy O'Rourke, an All-Ireland winning captain for Down. On matchday, Glasdrumman have lost one of their main players due to injury and O'Driscoll gives an unexpectedly "steely" half-time team talk.

The seventh episode was broadcast on 3 May 2009 and featured the second semi-final contested between Roche's Rockwell Rovers and Lynch's St Patrick's, Dromahair. Roche has All Ireland-winning Tyrone manager Mickey Harte fly in via helicopter and series one bainisteoir Gerald Kean follows suit, whilst Lynch has her team take part in the re-enactment of a battle in Leitrim and invites the players' wives and girlfriends on a night out.

The eighth episode was broadcast on 10 May 2009 and featured the Celebrity Bainisteoir final which was contested by Davis's Glasdrumman and Lynch's St Patrick's, Dromahair.

Glasdrumman lifted the trophy in the final at Parnell Park by a scoreline of 1–09 to 0–11.
