= List of Mrs. Brown's Boys episodes =

Mrs. Brown's Boys is an Irish television sitcom created by and starring Irish writer and performer Brendan O'Carroll and produced by RTÉ. O'Carroll himself plays his drag persona, Agnes Brown, with several close friends and family members making up the rest of the cast. The show adopts an informal production style where production mistakes and tomfoolery, mostly instigated by O'Carroll, are edited into each episode. Despite being lambasted by critics, the show has become a ratings success in both Ireland, where it is set, and Britain, where it is recorded. It is also gaining increasingly higher ratings in Australia and Canada. The show has won numerous awards.

It debuted on RTÉ One in Ireland on 1 January 2011 and on BBC One in the United Kingdom on 21 February 2011. As of 1 January 2026, 57 episodes of Mrs. Brown's Boys have aired.

== Series overview ==
Series
Series	Episodes	Originally released		Ave. UK viewers (millions)
Series	Episodes	First released	Last released	Ave. UK viewers (millions)
1	6	21 February 2011	28 March 2011	3.00
2	6	2 January 2012	4 February 2012	6.98
3	6	1 January 2013	4 February 2013	9.41
4	4	8 September 2023	29 September 2023	2.98
5	4	1 August 2025	29 August 2025	2.83
Specials
2011	1	26 December 2011		8.24
2012	2	24 December 2012	26 December 2012	11.20
2013	2	25 December 2013	30 December 2013	11.40
2014–2015	2	25 December 2014	1 January 2015	9.76
2015–2016	2	25 December 2015	1 January 2016	9.00
2016	1	23 July 2016		9.09
2016–2017	2	25 December 2016	1 January 2017	9.10
2017–2018	2	25 December 2017	1 January 2018	8.50
2018–2019	2	25 December 2018	1 January 2019	7.02
2019–2020	2	25 December 2019	1 January 2020	6.13
2020–2021	2	25 December 2020	1 January 2021	5.24
2021	1	29 October 2021		3.72
2021–2022	2	25 December 2021	1 January 2022	4.51
2022–2023	2	25 December 2022	1 January 2023	4.18
2023–2024	2	25 December 2023	1 January 2024	4.18
2024–2025	2	25 December 2024	1 January 2025	4.73
2025–2026	2	25 December 2025	1 January 2026	—

== Episodes ==
=== Series 1 (2011) ===
This 2009 unaired pilot episode of Mrs. Brown's Boys, titled "Dermot's Dilemma", follows the storyline of the first aired episode of the series, "The Mammy". However, there are some noticeable character and dialogue differences within the pilot. The unaired pilot was later released with the series 1 DVD. This can be found on disc 2.

No. overall	No. in series	Title	Directed by	Written by	Original release date	UK viewers (millions)
1	1	"The Mammy"	Ben Kellett	Brendan O'Carroll	21 February 2011	2.64; 0.539^{IP}
Agnes learns that her son Dermot has split up with his girlfriend Maria because he does not want to look at houses with her or move in with her. Grandad receives a visit from Dr. Flynn, who asks to do a rectal reading, and Grandad gets a thermometer stuck in his posterior. Agnes becomes concerned over Dermot and talks to Cathy about his situation, but when she wants to try to sort things out, Cathy warns her to stay out of it. Agnes does not listen, and talks to Maria before asking her to apologise for upsetting Dermot. Maria states she misunderstood the situation, and when Dermot gets home, she tells him to "get stuffed". Winnie talks about sex and vibrators when Cathy announces at the local pub she has a date. Betty proposes that Cathy give Dermot and Maria a counselling session; Agnes disagrees. Cathy goes ahead with the counselling and stages a fake fight with Agnes that results in Dermot proposing to Maria.
2	2	"Mammy's Secret"	Ben Kellett	Brendan O'Carroll	28 February 2011	2.63; 0.495^{IP}
Dermot's soon-to-be mother-in-law, Mrs. Hillary Nicholson visits; upon seeing the Browns, she thinks they are white trash and relocates the wedding to Italy. Betty has kicked Mark out because he turned down a promotion to supervisor because he is illiterate. Rory attempts to come out of the closet, but Agnes does not understand. Finally, Cathy is keeping her boyfriend a secret to herself.. Note: This episode is notable for introducing Mark and Rory to the TV series, and for mentioning Mark and Betty's son Bono for the first time.
3	3	"Mammy's Merchandise"	Ben Kellett	Brendan O'Carroll	7 March 2011	2.68; 0.497^{IP}
Dermot wants his best friend Buster Brady to be best man at his wedding, Maria disapproves, and Agnes says Dermot should have his own choice. Buster involves Dermot in a raffle scam that ends up saving the day when Winnie's husband Jacko needs €5,000 for an operation. Note: This is the first TV appearance of the breakout character Buster Brady.
4	4	"Mammy Rides Again"	Ben Kellett	Brendan O'Carroll	14 March 2011	2.99
Agnes and Winnie are not invited to Maria's hen party because they are too old, so they attempt to crash it, but they end up crashing a funeral instead, with Agnes jumping on an inflatable dildo and singing Tom Jones' "Sex Bomb". Later, Agnes invites Mrs. Nicholson to dinner, served by Rory and his 'friend' Dino. After hearing that Mrs. Nicholson has two toilets, Agnes has a second one installed under the stairs to impress her, but Grandad answers a call of nature in the wrong cupboard. Note: This is the first TV appearance of Rory's boyfriend, Dino Doyle.
5	5	"Mammy of the Groom"	Ben Kellett	Brendan O'Carroll	21 March 2011	2.96
With his wedding fast approaching, Dermot locks himself in the cupboard; later, Buster's very moving best-man speech drives Dermot out, and he finally gets over his reluctance about marrying her. With help from Cathy, Agnes discovers that Rory is gay and responds: "I know about your illness." Later Dermot and Maria are happily married.
6	6	"Mammy's Miracle"	Ben Kellett	Brendan O'Carroll	28 March 2011	4.10
Agnes thinks everyone has gone mad: Father Quinn thinks he is losing his faith as fast as he is losing his parishioners to the Church of Jesus Christ of Latter-day Saints; newlyweds Maria and Dermot will not stop fighting; and Grandad wants to hear all the nice things said at his funeral, after attending the funeral of one of his friends. Dermot suggests that they have a pretend funeral for Grandad, attended by close family and friends. Maria explains to Agnes that she and Dermot are fighting because he is unwilling to get a place of their own, so Agnes gets a death certificate for Grandad so Dermot and Maria can use the money to get a house. Agnes teaches a lesson to the Mormons who have been stealing Father Quinn's parishioners, after mistaking them for working for the undertaker. At his funeral, Grandad gets up when it turns out that no one has anything nice to say about him. Agnes declares this to be a miracle, restoring Father Quinn's faith. At the end the cast perform a song to Father Quinn, set to the tune of Should I Stay or Should I Go by The Clash.

=== Series 2 (2012) ===
No. overall	No. in series	Title	Directed by	Written by	Original release date	UK viewers (millions)
2011 Special
7	—	"Mammy's Ass"	Ben Kellett	Brendan O'Carroll	26 December 2011	8.24
It's Christmas and Agnes is waiting for her son Trevor to come home from Africa having not seen him in four years. Meanwhile, Hillary is pressuring Maria and Dermot to spend their first Christmas as a married couple at her house, but how will they tell Mammy? Note: This is the first Christmas special of the series and the first TV appearance of Agnes's youngest son, Trevor.
Series 2
8	1	"Mammy Pulls It Off"	Ben Kellett	Brendan O'Carroll	2 January 2012	6.60; 0.769^{IP}
Agnes is still waiting for Grandad's insurance money to come through after faking his death, but when the insurance company gets suspicious, she starts to worry. A man from the insurance company arrives, claiming that because Grandad's death certificate was not registered at the Office of Births, Marriages and Deaths, it is worthless, and he reveals that Grandad is still alive. With her fraud exposed, Agnes faces a lengthy imprisonment, so she decides to kill Grandad to get the insurance money for Dermot and Maria to get their own place. However, Maria uses her mother's relative James Nicholson, a supervisor at the insurance company, to have the case dropped, exonerating Agnes.
9	2	"Mammy's Coming!"	Ben Kellett	Brendan O'Carroll	9 January 2012	6.29; 0.666^{IP}
Agnes plans a big send-off for Trevor, who is off back to Africa, despite his insistence that she does not do anything fancy. Meanwhile, Buster lures Dermot back into the criminal world, by attempting to burgle a property whose owners also own a circus and are away for a large part of the year, but they have a run-in with a horny lion--with Buster receiving the worst injuries. Cathy also needs to prepare for a psychology assignment for college of a 'Family Group Session', which leads to a bitter quarrel between Agnes (who wants to use it as Trevor's leaving event) and Cathy, as Mark, Dermot, Rory and Trevor do not take it seriously. The episode ends with Cathy and Mick (who is investigating Dermot and Buster's burglary) separating, as Maria reveals that he is in fact a married man.
10	3	"iMammy (Batteries Not Included)"	Ben Kellett	Brendan O'Carroll	16 January 2012	6.37
Maria is preparing for motherhood with the help of a robot baby to test out her mothering skills, but how will Agnes take to living with a robotic baby? Meanwhile, Cathy's new boyfriend, who is also her professor, Dr Thomas Clowne, is vastly interested in interviewing Agnes for a book on motherhood, but Agnes herself is not interested and wants to duck out of it. Maria also reveals she is having twins.
11	4	"SuperMammy"	Ben Kellett	Brendan O'Carroll	23 January 2012	7.05; 0.694^{IP}
Agnes decides to go on a diet after the family comment on her weight. Meanwhile, Rory is promoted to manager at Wash & Blow, but he is inundated with big decisions, he falls out with Dino, and he faces a dilemma when he discovers illegal drugs in the salon. He is forced to tell Agnes they are heartburn pills, and when she has indigestion, she takes the tablets and subsequently goes wild, prompting Professor Clowne to use her for an interview in his book, after he and Cathy witness her LSD-induced antics. In the end, Rory and Dino are made joint managers of the salon.
12	5	"Mammy's Going"	Ben Kellett	Brendan O'Carroll	30 January 2012	7.25
The Brown family decide that the family dog Spartacus needs to go into a home, but they do not know how to tell Agnes; however, she overhears and thinks they are talking about her. Note: This is a TV adaption of A.L.F, the 6th DVD in the Mrs Brown heptalogy from before the TV series and after the movie.
13	6	"New Mammy"	Ben Kellett	Brendan O'Carroll	4 February 2012	8.31; 0.692^{IP}
With the triplets on the way, Cathy convinces Agnes to make amends with Mrs Nicholson, so she invites her to Foley's with Winnie. However, the fun between Agnes and Hillary stops when Maria goes into labour, and she delivers three healthy boys; meanwhile, Buster finally manages to get the new family into their own home. Elsewhere, Mark hears that he is not as romantic as he used to be, and tries to liven things up with him and Betty, with flowers and a trip to Venice. At the end of the episode, Agnes and Mark sing Macy Gray's "I Try".

=== Series 3 (2013) ===
No. overall	No. in series	Title	Directed by	Written by	Original release date	UK viewers (millions)
2012 Specials
14	—	"Mammy Christmas"	Ben Kellett	Brendan O'Carroll	24 December 2012	11.69; 0.692^{IP}
Agnes is annoyed when the annual Nativity play is cancelled, so she decides to write her own; meanwhile Father Quinn's replacement, Father Damien, arrives in the parish.
15	—	"The Virgin Mammy"	Ben Kellett	Brendan O'Carroll	26 December 2012	10.72
On the day of the Brown family Nativity play, the only thing standing in the way is Father Damien, who wants to make some last-minute changes.
Series 3
16	1	"Mammy's Spell"	Ben Kellett	Brendan O'Carroll	1 January 2013	9.78; 1.398^{IP}
During a party to celebrate the baptism of Dermot and Maria's triplets, an unwitting Agnes and Winnie are put under the spell of the hypnotist booked to provide the entertainment. Mark has some upsetting news, revealing they may have to emigrate to Australia, and Agnes must turn a heartbroken Bono away when he plans to live with her.
17	2	"Mammy's Inflation"	Ben Kellett	Brendan O'Carroll	7 January 2013	9.20; 1.117^{IP}
Cathy contemplates having breast enlargement surgery to make herself more attractive to Professor Clowne, and Agnes steals and plays with her inflatable chest pack, which ends disastrously. Elsewhere, Rory attempts to learn how to drive; and Buster hires a blind draughtsman, Mr. Giddyeye, to redesign Agnes's kitchen; Cathy breaks up with Professor Clowne when she thinks he is proposing, but has another question.
18	3	"Mammy's Break"	Ben Kellett	Brendan O'Carroll	14 January 2013	9.66
Agnes wants to celebrate the 27th anniversary of Redser's death with a holiday to Galway, but what to do with "the man that God forgot" (Grandad)? She tries to send him to a home, but Winnie's the one who gets sent away when she believes the lies Agnes had told Grandad to get him into the home. Meanwhile, Redser has ominous news from beyond the grave...
19	4	"Mammy's Valentine"	Ben Kellett	Brendan O'Carroll	21 January 2013	9.26; 1.021^{IP}
Betty buys the "ABC of Sex" book in order to teach her son Bono the "birds and the bees". Meanwhile, with help from a gigolo site called "Dial-A-Dick", Agnes gets a sex date for Valentine's night. Dermot employs Buster to buy a bus saying "I love Maria Brown" after hearing that she thinks he is not romantic anymore. However, Buster slightly screws up by also writing "Cathy Brown does not need her tits blown up", but Cathy is touched by this and buys him a drink at Foley's. Grandad gets a threesome with help from Viagra.
20	5	"Mammy?"	Ben Kellett	Brendan O'Carroll	28 January 2013	9.46
Agnes gets a phone call that makes her children believe they are adopted and they all try hinting at her, but it turns out the call was about Redser's pension. Meanwhile, Rory and Dino have a bust-up, but later make up and even get engaged! Also, Mark and Betty tell Agnes they are not emigrating: the printing out flyers for Mark's business was caused by Cathy, who manages to reunite with Mick after he reveals the truth about his past and affair.
21	6	"Mammy Swings!"	Ben Kellett	Brendan O'Carroll	4 February 2013	9.10; 1.350^{IP}
Rory and Dino are getting married, but La La Doggie, the wedding planner, believes that it should stand out because it is a gay wedding. He proposes an underwater wedding, which Rory does not want as he cannot swim, and which also gets ridiculed by Agnes. Agnes meets Mick's parents and learns they are swingers, much to her horror after an unpleasant encounter and her misunderstanding "swingers" as being jazz music fans. Meanwhile, Agnes gets a new kitchen, supplied by Mark, but Rory destroys it with his new unlicensed car that has some sort of brake problem, which Buster got for him and Dino as a wedding present, although Agnes is pleased by the demolition, because she "didn't love the kitchen anyway." The cast quickly transitions into performing "Greased Lightnin" from Grease (sung by Mark). Agnes makes a cake in her microwave but screws it up, after misreading the amount of flour in the recipe. Rory and Dino, fed up with La La Doggie's outlandish ideas and not feeling they have enough say, end up marrying in a private ceremony.

=== Annual specials (2013–2023) ===
No. overall	Title	Directed by	Written by	Original release date	UK viewers (millions)
2013 Specials
22	"Buckin' Mammy"	Ben Kellett	Brendan O'Carroll and Paul Mayhew-Archer	25 December 2013	11.52; 1.308^{IP}
Agnes is determined to find out what Bono wants for Christmas as he will not tell anyone. She also deals with this year's Christmas tree (remote-controlled for applying decorations) and with the family Game Night.
23	"Who's A Pretty Mammy?"	Ben Kellett	Brendan O'Carroll and Paul Mayhew-Archer	30 December 2013	11.27; 0.986^{IP}
Agnes desperately tries to convince Mark and Betty not to send Bono to the infamous local school; she must also convince the determined Father McBride, who asks her to look after the parrot that belonged to Maria's late Aunt Mary. Meanwhile, Agnes might have to see in the New Year on her own when guests start canceling on her big party.
2014–2015 Specials
24	"Mammy's Tickled Pink"	Ben Kellett	Brendan O'Carroll and Paul Mayhew-Archer	25 December 2014	9.85; 1.010^{IP}
Buster installs a singing Christmas tree for Agnes, which proves to be temperamental. Dino's Christmas gift to Rory is plastic surgery, but Agnes misunderstands and thinks Rory is having gender-reassignment surgery to become a woman. Jacko's last sibling passes away and Jacko and Winnie inherit his house, which is conveniently next to the hospital so Winnie could easily see Jacko every day if she moved there.
25	"Mammy's Gamble"	Ben Kellett	Brendan O'Carroll and Paul Mayhew-Archer	1 January 2015	9.67; 0.989^{IP}
Following a spate of burglaries in Finglas (including one where 92 James Larkin Court was robbed of its TV, landline phone, and Agnes's armchair by burglars dressed as repairmen), Agnes reluctantly allows Buster to install a locking bolt on the back door, a burglar alarm system for the front door, and a series of metal shutters dubbed the "rat trap" in all the doorways in the house. But since the alarm system was made in North Korea, add in a dodgy timer and Buster's stupidity and behold a waste of time and money. Meanwhile, Dermot announces that he wants to set up his own promotions business, but the banks refuse to give him a loan; and Cathy is planning to use artificial insemination to have a child, which goads Buster to offer her an unorthodox proposal. Agnes tries to sort everything out by playing against Hilary Nicholson in a poker tournament at Foley's for a €15,000 prize.
2015–2016 Specials
26	"Mammy's Christmas Punch"	Ben Kellett	Brendan O'Carroll	25 December 2015	9.80; 0.969^{IP}
It's Christmastime in Finglas, and this year, Agnes wants a quiet festive period. However, fate seems to have other ideas, when Mark and Betty fall out when Mark's ex-girlfriend Bubbles turns up. To make matters worse, Agnes believes her family does not want her around when they plan to send her to Canada to see her sister Dolly for the first time in many years. Meanwhile, Winnie produces her "bucket list" and Agnes tries to help her with it; and the new Christmas tree has an unusual security feature: a series of concealed boxing gloves that punch anyone who tries to steal it.
27	"Mammy's Widow's Memories"	Ben Kellett	Brendan O'Carroll	1 January 2016	8.20; 0.887^{IP}
When a handsome stranger appears in Foley's Pub, everyone presumes he is after Cathy, but he reveals he is actually interested in Agnes, much to her surprise. Agnes agrees to go on a date with him, which ultimately ends in disaster.
2016 Live Special
28	"Mrs Brown’s Boys Live: Mammy Sutra"	Ben Kellett	Brendan O'Carroll	23 July 2016	9.09; 1.113^{IP}
For the first time ever the episode goes completely live. When Agnes discovers Mark and Betty are having bedroom problems she decides to sort things out; and Dermot is forced to make an executive decision with Buster.
2016–2017 Specials
29	"Mammy's Forest"	Ben Kellett	Brendan O'Carroll	25 December 2016	9.16; 1.066^{IP}
Agnes decides not to have a Christmas tree this year. Elsewhere, the Wash & Blow Salon catches fire, which means Rory and Dino must set up shop in Agnes's living room; Dermot and Buster face tough competition to earn a new advertising contract; Grandad is not enjoying the festivities following his recent meeting with Dr. Flynn; Mark's expensive watch goes missing; and an entire forest of Christmas trees shows up in Agnes's living room.
30	"Chez Mammy"	Ben Kellett	Brendan O'Carroll	1 January 2017	9.04; 1.066^{IP}
When Agnes discovers that Bono is being bullied at school, her efforts to help only make things worse. Meanwhile, Dr. Flynn prescribes medical marijuana for Grandad, who refuses to take it in any form, so Agnes bakes it into chocolate brownies--which liven up her meeting with the bully's mother, Betty, Hillary, and Father Damian; and Cathy's new boyfriend is a Frenchman.
2017–2018 Specials
31	"Mammy's Mummy"	Ben Kellett	Brendan O'Carroll	25 December 2017	9.29; 1.035^{IP}
Agnes has a new Christmas tree courtesy of Buster, which turns out to be an automatic side brusher that he stole from the local car wash. Meanwhile, Rory has had plastic surgery to improve his looks and spends most of this episode with his head bandaged, Dermot and Buster run a Santa's Grotto, with Grandad as Father Christmas and Bono as an elf--until Betty finds he has been missing school; Grandad thinks the house is haunted after watching a horror movie; Cathy has a new Internet boyfriend, Jake. Note: this episode marks the first appearance of Damien McKiernan as Rory Brown, following the character's recasting.
32	"CSI: Mammy"	Ben Kellett	Brendan O'Carroll	1 January 2018	7.71; 0.896^{IP}
When Father Damien's church gets burgled and vandalised, along with Hillary Nicholson having a peeping tom problem at home, Maria decides to set up a neighbourhood watch group, with support from Hillary, Father Damien, the Gardai and most of the residents of Finglas – and Agnes and Winnie join up, too, but it becomes apparent that they aren't crimefighter material. Elsewhere, Agnes tries to help Cathy's love life but makes it worse by putting the family's address on the Liveline radio talk show with Joe Duffy; Mark and Betty are at loggerheads over letting Bono attend an under-13s disco at school; Dermot and Buster advertise local honey dressed up as bees; and Mark installs a new kitchen door for Agnes.
2018–2019 Specials
33	"Exotic Mammy"	Ben Kellett	Brendan O'Carroll	25 December 2018	7.06
It's Christmas in Finglas again, and Father Damien hosts an indoor Christmas decoration competition in order to raise funds for the Finglas Warriors football team. Agnes takes part, determined to win the prize (two tickets to see the Warriors in the finals), and suggests Hillary as one of the judges, alongside Dr. Flynn and Father McBride. Meanwhile, Dermot and Buster buy Agnes an Irish variant of Alexa, which she has trouble working, and Rory and Dino help prepare Buster for his date with a girl he met online. The Christmas tree this year is a collapsable upright model made out of patterned tissue paper that opens and closes on a spine, like a book.
34	"Mammy's Motel"	Ben Kellett	Brendan O'Carroll	1 January 2019	6.98
A storm hits Finglas, resulting in the pipes bursting at Winnie and Sharon's house. Agnes and Cathy immediately allow them to stay at 92 James Larkin Court, but this leads to tension between the Browns and the McGoogans, especially when Winnie criticises Agnes's loud snoring and Sharon wears Cathy's scarf in her hair and saying that her bedroom is a mess. Elsewhere, Rory and Dino are thinking about adopting a son and ask Cathy to provide a reference for them; Mark and his friends try to fix the plumbing at Winnie's house; Father Damien asks Agnes to perform the eulogy at the funeral of Jacko's cousin Nellie Scullie (whom she never really knew); and Bono celebrates his 13th birthday at 92 James Larkin court with his family and school friends; last but not least, Buster has a bombshell to drop...
2019–2020 Specials
35	"A Wonderful Mammy"	Ben Kellett	Brendan O'Carroll	25 December 2019	7.04
Christmas has returned to Finglas once more, but the feeling is far from festive within the Brown family, and on James Larkin Court in general. Buster has his own problems to deal with, while Agnes has fallen out with Winnie, who accuses Agnes of not caring. Even worse, Betty scolds Agnes for giving Bono (who is playing George Bailey in a production of It's a Wonderful Life) money to buy something at school breaktime, Cathy refuses to trust Agnes anymore after reading her diary and Mark threatens to not get his mother anything for Christmas if she does not listen to Betty. Wallowing in self-pity at Foley's, Agnes wonders what life in Finglas would be like if she hadn't been born. Clyde, a man who presents himself as an "angel-in-training" and needing his wings, grants Agnes's wish, and shows her an alternative timeline, in which Hillary (now called Hillary Brown) lives at 92 James Larkin Court in place of Agnes, and the children (now Hillary's own children), their spouses, Buster and Bono have different names and stories, as well as Grandad being in a home, Winnie (now Winifred) recognising Agnes from somewhere and Sharon now being a nun. The Christmas tree this year shoots fake snow from the top. In the end, it turns out everyone was pretending to have Agnes's wish granted to surprise her.
36	"Orange Is The New Mammy"	Ben Kellett	Brendan O'Carroll	1 January 2020	5.22
Winnie fears for her life when she hears the news that Peggy Piper the Pernod Poisoner is out of prison pending appeal, as she will have to give evidence again at the hearing. Winnie was the witness who had Peggy put in prison, claiming she had seen Peggy poison a glass of Pernod that was then drunk by her husband, Peter. The Brown family, Dr. Flynn and Father Damien begin to question if Peggy really did poison Peter, and Cathy creates a group campaigning to have Peggy exonerated at her trial. Elsewhere, Grandad has a mishap with his hearing aid, and Dermot and Buster are running a recruiting appeal for the Defence Forces, dressed as Army soldiers and having Buster wear an expensive rented tank prop – which he then loses and has to try and find before Dermot finds out.
2020–2021 Specials
37	"Mammy of the People"	Ben Kellett	Brendan O'Carroll	25 December 2020	5.98
It is Christmas in Finglas once again, and Agnes and the Brown family are dealing with the effects of lockdown. Agnes mishears a phone call from Dr. Flynn and unnecessarily checks to see if 'Grandad's testicles have gone black yet' when she was in fact asked if Grandad's test results had come back yet. A new year brings a new Christmas tree, and this year's coughing tree with a mask represents the COVID-19 pandemic. Meanwhile Agnes wins a competition to broadcast a speech to the nation following the Queen's speech, resulting in her falling out with Winnie, who was desperate to win. Agnes is disqualified from the competition owing to Ireland not being in the Commonwealth; however, the Brown family decides to record a speech anyway and Agnes addresses the nation in true Agnes fashion.
38	"Mammy's Memories?"	Ben Kellett	Brendan O'Carroll	1 January 2021	5.18
Agnes is shocked after she receives a letter from a man named Malachy claiming to be Redser's illegitimate son and Grandad is complaining about being in pain yet again. Cathy is down in the dumps owing to her upcoming 50th birthday which she is worried about. Meanwhile Winnie's house is burgled, and her mother's wedding ring is stolen, as well as Sharon's sex toys. Hillary fails to help the situation when she arrives at the Brown household providing little comfort to Winnie. Agnes's worries are put to rest when she discovers the mystery man is not in fact Redser's son, and Cathy warms to the idea of celebrating her birthday when Agnes shares the tale of the time she was in labour. Buster recovers Winnie and Sharon's stolen possessions and the Brown family and friends celebrate Cathy's birthday in Foley's.
2021 Halloween Special
39	"10 Year Anniversary Special: Mammy's Boo Who?"	Ben Kellett	Brendan O'Carroll	29 October 2021	3.72
To celebrate ten years of being on TV, Mrs. Brown's Boys does a live Halloween special. Agnes thinks she is seeing the ghost of Redser in the house on Halloween, but nobody else can see him. Is she going mad? Will an impromptu exorcism performed by Father Damien help? Elsewhere, Dermot and Buster (respectively dressed as a vampire and a witch) are helping run a haunted house at the community centre, and Betty and Bono are at loggerheads over Bono thinking himself too old for dressing up and trick-or-treating. Note: Pat "Pepsi" Shields plays a double role in this episode: as well as his usual role of Mark, he also plays the ghost of Redser.
2021–2022 Specials
40	"Mammy's Mechanical Merriment"	Ben Kellett	Brendan O'Carroll	25 December 2021	4.63
It's Christmas and the Brown family are still dealing with the effects of the pandemic. Cathy wants Agnes to go on a diet after gaining weight during lockdown but she is not keen on the idea. Dermot and Buster are in charge of promoting a garden centre but not before they come up with their latest scam of a Murder Mystery Night in Foley's. Hillary becomes ill and therefore unable to attend the choir, so Father Damien and Father McBride promote Agnes to conductor. The pandemic has left Finglas with a shortage of Christmas trees and so this year's tree ends up being a ladder, provided by Buster.
41	"Mammy's Mickey"	Ben Kellett	Brendan O'Carroll	1 January 2022	4.40
Agnes is outraged to hear that Grandad's younger brother, Mickey, has been released from prison and his visit causes friction in the Brown's household. Grandad is thrilled about his return; however, Agnes becomes suspicious when Mickey reveals that he needs €5000 to invest in a scheme in Africa. Fearing that he is trying to fleece Grandad, Agnes gives Mickey the money if he leaves Finglas. Unaware of this, Grandad believes that Agnes was in the wrong and that Mickey has changed for the better as he left without asking him for the money. As a goodwill gesture, Buster and Dermot manage to retrieve the money. Winnie is determined to make some New Year's resolutions, and when Rory and Dino decide to remain in China, Barbara is left to run Wash & Blow.
2022–2023 Specials
42	"Shining Mammy"	Ben Kellett	Brendan O'Carroll	25 December 2022	4.35
It's Christmas in Finglas once again, and this year Cathy has a new boyfriend, Boris. A last-minute change of plans leaves Agnes babysitting the widower's twins while he and Cathy head to Foley's for a quiet, romantic drink. Not everyone is convinced he is right for Cathy, and there are even suspicions that he might be a vampire. But it is not Boris that Agnes is worried about; she has her own concerns over his creepy twins.
43	"Mammy's Hair Loom"	Ben Kellett	Brendan O'Carroll	1 January 2023	4.00
Suspicion surrounds Cathy's creepy boyfriend, Boris. Buster and Dermot are convinced he is a vampire and hatch a plan to save Cathy, which leaves her mortified. Sharon has boyfriend troubles of her own, and Father Damien has been called away to tend to some depressed chickens. Meanwhile, Buster convinces Agnes she should have her antique vase valued. Who knows how much it could be worth? After all, it has been handed down through generations, and she plans to leave it to Cathy as her inheritance.

- ^IP iPlayer viewers, up to the end of the relevant month. Since 2018, iPlayer ratings have been included in the final figure.

=== Series 4 (2023) ===
A four-episode series aired on BBC One from 8 September 2023 to 29 September 2023. However, the four episodes were released on BBC iPlayer a week before the first broadcast of the first episode on BBC iPlayer.

No. overall	No. in series	Title	Directed by	Written by	Original release date	UK viewers (millions)
44	1	"Miserable Mammy"	Ben Kellett	Brendan O'Carroll and Paddy Houlihan	8 September 2023	2.76
Agnes is feeling down in the dumps, and Granddad's bowel movements are not helping matters. The place is a mess, and she cannot seem to get any sleep and to make things worse, Maria's home remedies end in disaster. Will the family show some much-needed and long overdue appreciation for poor Agnes?
45	2	"Mammy Scissorhands"	Ben Kellett	Brendan O'Carroll and Paddy Houlihan	15 September 2023; 8 September 2023 (iPlayer)	2.78
Agnes decides to try out speed-dating at Foley's, while a promotional scheme by Buster and Dermot for the Wash & Blow salon backfires – can Agnes and Winnie step in to save the day? The arrival of a new neighbour (Birdie) puts Agnes and Winnie's friendship to the test. Guest starring June Rodgers as Birdie.
46	3	"Million-Dollar Mammy"	Ben Kellett	Brendan O'Carroll and Paddy Houlihan	22 September 2023; 8 September 2023 (iPlayer)	2.74
Lotto fever has hit Foley's bar, and it does not take long before rumours swirl around Finglas that Agnes is the jackpot winner. Meanwhile, a DNA test and the surprise return visit of Cathy's childhood friend leaves Agnes with some serious questions to answer about her past.
47	4	"Mountain Mammy"	Ben Kellett	Brendan O'Carroll and Paddy Houlihan	29 September 2023; 8 September 2023 (iPlayer)	2.67
Dermot and Maria decide to renew their wedding vows, forcing Agnes to organise the ceremony alongside arch-nemesis Hillary. Will she be able to cope with Hillary's high-society demands? Meanwhile, Fathers Damien and Trevor go on a mountain pilgrimage that goes wrong. Will they make it back in time to officiate at the ceremony? Or at all?

=== Annual specials (2023–2025) ===
No. overall	Title	Directed by	Written by	Original release date	UK viewers (millions)
2023–2024 Specials
48	"Mammy's Mare"	Ben Kellett	Brendan O'Carroll and Paddy Houlihan	25 December 2023	4.07
All Agnes wants is a nice, peaceful Christmas, but the family have other ideas. Cathy has decided to cook Christmas dinner for the first time ever, a sentimental decoration belonging to Agnes has gone missing, and there is a surprise dinner guest, all of which have the potential to ruin Agnes's quiet Christmas.
49	"New Year, New Mammy"	Ben Kellett	Brendan O'Carroll and Paddy Houlihan	1 January 2024	4.28
Agnes, alongside her friends and family, starts the new year by attempting a tough new health and fitness regime, but while Maria and Cathy work hard to get the gang into shape, a mysterious visitor to Finglas raises some difficult questions about Agnes and Winnie's past.
2024–2025 Specials
50	"Ding Dong Mammy"	Ben Kellett	Brendan O'Carroll and Paddy Houlihan	25 December 2024	5.56
It is Christmas in Finglas once again, and Agnes is failing to convince the gang she is not grumpy. Cathy pulls the community together in support of a festive good cause, while Buster sources a sustainable tree. Final appearance of Amanda Woods as Betty Brown.
51	"B&B Mammy"	Ben Kellett	Brendan O'Carroll and Paddy Houlihan	1 January 2025	3.90
Agnes decides to turn her spare room into a bed and breakfast, but with an escaped dangerous criminal on the loose in Finglas, what could possibly go wrong.

=== Series 5 (2025) ===
A four-episode series was filmed between May and June 2025 which aired from 1 August to 29 August on BBC One, although all episodes were made available on BBC iPlayer in the UK and RTÉ Player in Ireland on 1 August 2025.

No. overall	No. in series	Title	Directed by	Written by	Original release date	UK viewers (millions)
52	1	"The Mammy Effect"	Ben Kellett	Brendan O'Carroll and Paddy Houlihan	1 August 2025	3.10
Agnes becomes a podcast sensation, with Cathy horrified to discover her mother has accidentally hijacked her new project.
53	2	"Mammy's Talent"	Ben Kellett	Brendan O'Carroll and Paddy Houlihan	8 August 2025	2.80
Agnes panics when Grandad announces that he is leaving with intention to move into an attractive retirement home, before Foley's pub hosts its annual chaotic talent show, with Father Damien trying to get Agnes to serve as a judge for the show. Mark performs as Elvis, Buster tries to do Stand-up comedy, and Birdie sings "That's What Friends Are For".
54	3	"Motor Mammy"	Ben Kellett	Brendan O'Carroll and Paddy Houlihan	15 August 2025	2.75
Agnes helps Winnie as she learns to drive, risking life and limb across Finglas. Elsewhere, Hilary asks Agnes for help in asking the Dublin Bus company to change one of the bus routes so that it stops on her road (which she shares with the church, the town hall and Father Damien's house); and Maria learns that her father has lost his job and has become a part-time bus driver. The episode ends as the Gardai tell Mark that Winnie has crashed her car into Agnes, and she lies in a hospital bed, in a coma...
55	4	"Easy Rider Mammy"	Ben Kellett	Brendan O'Carroll and Paddy Houlihan	29 August 2025	2.66
After accidentally picking up one of Cathy's novels, Agnes discovers she has a surprising fondness for steamy fiction. When she gatecrashes her daughter's book group meeting to share her insights, Cathy is mortified.

=== Annual specials (2025–2026) ===
No. overall	Title	Directed by	Written by	Original release date	UK viewers (millions)
2025–2026 Specials
56	"Mammy's Bottles"	Ben Kellett	Brendan O'Carroll and Paddy Houlihan	25 December 2025	N/A
Agnes rediscovers the meaning of family as she gathers them all together for a Christmas photo. Buster unveils another one of his signature Christmas trees with maximum impact, while Cathy frets about what presents to buy everyone.
57	"Stormin' Mammy"	Ben Kellett	Brendan O'Carroll and Paddy Houlihan	1 January 2026	N/A
Agnes and the family prepare for an incoming storm, as Buster nervously awaits to embark on his birthday parachute jump organised by Dermot. Meanwhile Winnie receives a shock to the system, suddenly becoming intelligent after being struck by lightning, while a lost nun looks for help. (NB: This is the last show in the BBC commission contract, which lasted from 2020 to 2026.)
