= Mrs. Brown's Boys =

Television series and sitcom by Brendan O'Carroll

- Genre: Comedy
- Created by: Brendan O'Carroll
- Written by: Brendan O'Carroll, Paddy Houlihan and Paul Mayhew-Archer.
- Directed by: Ben Kellett
- Starring: Brendan O'Carroll; Jennifer Gibney; Eilish O'Carroll; Danny O'Carroll; Rory Cowan; Fiona O'Carroll; Pat "Pepsi" Shields; Paddy Houlihan; Amanda Woods; Dermot O'Neill; Gary Hollywood; Fiona Gibney; Martin Delany; Conor Maloney; Susie Blake; June Rodgers; Sorcha Cusack; Stephen McConnell
- Theme music composer: Andy O'Callaghan
- Opening theme: Mrs. Brown's Boys Theme Tune
- Ending theme: Mrs. Brown's Boys Outro
- Composer: Andy O'Callaghan
- Countries of origin: Ireland; United Kingdom
- Original language: English
- No. of series: 5
- No. of episodes: 57 (31 specials) (list of episodes)

Production
- Executive producers: Brendan O'Carroll; Chris Sussman; Justin Healy; Mark Freeland; Martin Delany; Ewan Angus; Steven Canny; Eddie Doyle
- Producers: Stephen McCrum; James Farrell; Fiona Gibney; Tracy McParland
- Production location: BBC Pacific Quay
- Editor: Mark Lawrence
- Camera setup: Multi-camera setup
- Running time: 30–40 minutes
- Production companies: BBC Studios Comedy Productions; BBC Scotland; BOC-PIX; RTÉ

Original release
- Network: BBC One; RTÉ One (Ireland)
- Release: 1 January 2011 – present

Related
- All Round to Mrs. Brown's

Mrs. Brown's Boys is a British-Irish sitcom created by and starring Brendan O'Carroll and produced in Ireland by BBC and BBC Studios in partnership with BOC-PIX and Irish broadcaster RTÉ. The series stars O'Carroll as Agnes Brown, with several of O'Carroll's close friends and family members making up the rest of the cast. The show adopts an informal production style often breaking the fourth wall; material that would normally be outtakes are intentionally left in broadcast episodes, along with intentional tomfoolery, mostly instigated by O'Carroll.

Mrs. Brown's Boys was developed from O'Carroll's works going back to the early 1990s. The character, Agnes Browne, first appeared in stage plays, radio plays, books, and straight-to-DVD films. For the sitcom, the spelling of Agnes' surname was shortened from Browne to Brown. A stage show has continued to run, and during February and March 2014 it toured Australia. A feature film, Mrs. Brown's Boys D'Movie, was released on 27 June 2014. In late 2023, the show returned for a fourth series of four episodes. In April 2025, it was announced that a fifth series of four episodes had been commissioned which were filmed in May 2025, and was broadcast on BBC1 on 1 August 2025.

The show has received poor reviews by critics and received unfavourable comparisons to Father Ted. Despite this, it became a ratings success in both Ireland, where it is set, and the United Kingdom, where it is recorded. It also received high ratings in Australia, New Zealand and Canada. The show has won numerous industry awards. Despite a limited number of episodes, the show has returned annually for Christmas and New Year's specials since 2013, excluding 2026 as they were unable to film the specials due to O'Carroll requiring jaw surgery.

== Background ==
The original radio play version of Mrs. Browne's Boys (the 'e' in Browne was later dropped) appeared first on Irish radio station RTÉ 2fm in 1992, then in a series of books written by Brendan O'Carroll from the mid-1990s onwards. The books, entitled The Mammy, The Chisellers, The Granny, and The Young Wan, were first published in Ireland, before being made available in the United Kingdom. In 1999, The Mammy was adapted into a film titled Agnes Browne with Anjelica Huston playing the title character. Following the film's success, O'Carroll wrote a series of stories adapted from the books, in which he played Mrs. Browne (now spelled 'Brown') and cast the rest of the family – including many of his own relatives as characters.

A series of seven film-like adaptations was made and went straight to DVD release, originally officially just for Ireland, and since re-released via Universal Pictures, as "Mrs Brown(e)'s Boys – The Original Series". In turn, while these 7 straight-to-video features were released over the next few years, they would then also become adapted into the 7 stage plays later performed in rotation on the various tours, originally just in Ireland.

During this time, O'Carroll took the show on the road, appearing in a series of Mrs. Brown plays in the United Kingdom and Ireland. Outside of Ireland, the stage show got its big break at Pavilion Theatre, Glasgow, where manager Iain Gordon liked O'Carroll's idea and decided to put it on, but the show didn't sell and O'Carroll suggested a 2-for-1 ticket deal, after which the show became a hit. For the next seven years, two different Mrs Brown's Boys shows were on for up to three weeks at a time. The Pavilion became known as "The Home of Mrs Brown".

There were also occasional DVD releases of the live theatre audience theatrical versions of the seven plays adapted from the original "The Original Series" features. These tour versions of the features are the video series referred to as the "Live Tour/Show", not to be confused with the live BBC/RTE TV broadcast episodes.

== Production ==
In early 2009, O'Carroll was approached by BBC Scotland producer Stephen McCrum to create a television series based on the stage show. O'Carroll recruited an expanded cast mainly from family members and wrote a pilot, but production was held back a year due to the Jonathan Ross/Russell Brand incident. The unbroadcast pilot was created in November 2009, and within three weeks of the pilot being submitted to the BBC, they commissioned a full series. Subsequently, RTÉ came on board to help produce the series in partnership with the BBC. The first series aired on RTÉ One from 1 January to 5 February 2011. In the United Kingdom, the BBC transmitted the first episode on 21 February 2011.

Following the success of the first series, RTÉ and the BBC commissioned a second, which began with a Christmas special broadcast on 25 December 2011 on RTÉ One, and the next day on BBC One. The latter was the most watched television programme in Ireland over the Christmas season. The second series began on New Year's Eve 2011 in Ireland, and two days later in the United Kingdom.

The BBC commissioned a third series in November 2011 a few weeks before the second series was broadcast. O'Carroll described the commission as "An extraordinary gift and we genuinely don't take it lightly. We're overwhelmed with the support of the audience and hopefully when they see what we've done with the second series they'll see that maybe the BBC is not totally mad." Cheryl Taylor, the controller of comedy commissioning for the BBC also commented on the commission of a third series, "The new Mrs Brown's episodes are rip-roaring fun and will delight her ever growing army of fans. I am pleased as punch that we are commissioning series three – go Agnes!" Following two Christmas specials, the third series began on 29 December 2012 on RTÉ One and on 1 January 2013 on BBC One.

According to Gary Hollywood, who played Dino, on a radio interview, a Mrs. Brown's Boys Christmas Special for 2013 would be recorded in May 2013, due to a busy schedule of UK touring and the potential of filming the Mrs. Brown film (due for cinematic release in June 2014) from September to November 2013. On 30 January 2013, the BBC announced that two Christmas specials had been commissioned for 2013.

The BBC announced that they had commissioned two more Christmas specials for 2015. O'Carroll stated: "I have been commissioned to write another two Christmas specials and the BBC are expecting Christmas specials up until 2020." In December 2020, O’Carroll announced that additional Christmas specials had been commissioned up to 2026, stating "This new deal we signed last week goes all the way to 2026, which means I will be able to grow into the part, and we’ve a clause in which guarantees Mrs Brown is aired at 10pm on Christmas night, or else we don’t have to make it.".

On 19 February 2022, it was announced that Mrs. Brown’s Boys would be returning for a fourth series set to air in 2022. This marked the first new series of the show in almost 10 years. It was later announced that the series was put on hold due to scheduling difficulties, with it instead being a four episode mini-series, filmed in 2023. The series aired in September 2023, with the first episode on September 8, and the next three weekly.

In 2025, a fifth series of Mrs. Brown’s Boys was filmed between May and June 2025, this aired from 1 August to 29 August on BBC One. All four episodes were made available on BBC iPlayer in the UK and RTÉ Player in Ireland from 1 August 2025.

Mrs. Brown's Boys is recorded at the BBC Pacific Quay studios in Glasgow and is recorded in front of a live audience, which is seen at the beginning and the end of each show.

In August 2026, O'Carroll announced in a statement that the Christmas and New Year's specials would not return for that year, as they were unable to film due to O'Carroll suffering two fractures in his jaw, therefore requiring surgery and several months recovery.

== Premise ==
While a fictional storyline is the basis of each episode, the programme uses a laissez-faire style in which areas beyond the set, including equipment and crew, are sometimes seen and aspects of the show's production are lampooned within the fictional dialogue. The show takes a more irregular concept as bloopers such as characters getting lines wrong or corpsing; and set, camera, and prop faults are not edited out of the episodes.

At the beginning of most episodes Agnes Brown breaks the fourth wall, with an introductory monologue. Each episode ends with Agnes again breaking the fourth wall to say goodbye. As the credits roll, the camera pulls out to see the audience and the cast of the entire episode lining up to take a bow. The finale (also including some Christmas specials) of every series so far has ended with a music performance by the cast. "Who's a Pretty Mammy" ended with a performance of Auld Lang Syne, complete with bagpipes.

The show also has a number of recurring running gags; examples include Agnes' blissful ignorance of Rory's obvious homosexuality in series 1, Dermot's outlandish costumes and alliterative tongue-twisters in relation to his job as a promoter, and in the festive specials, a Christmas tree that typically malfunctions on Agnes with "hilarious" consequences.

== Episodes ==
Series
Series	Episodes	Originally released		Ave. UK viewers (millions)
Series	Episodes	First released	Last released	Ave. UK viewers (millions)
1	6	21 February 2011	28 March 2011	3.00
2	6	2 January 2012	4 February 2012	6.98
3	6	1 January 2013	4 February 2013	9.41
4	4	8 September 2023	29 September 2023	2.98
5	4	1 August 2025	29 August 2025	2.83
Specials
2011	1	26 December 2011		8.24
2012	2	24 December 2012	26 December 2012	11.20
2013	2	25 December 2013	30 December 2013	11.40
2014–2015	2	25 December 2014	1 January 2015	9.76
2015–2016	2	25 December 2015	1 January 2016	9.00
2016	1	23 July 2016		9.09
2016–2017	2	25 December 2016	1 January 2017	9.10
2017–2018	2	25 December 2017	1 January 2018	8.50
2018–2019	2	25 December 2018	1 January 2019	7.02
2019–2020	2	25 December 2019	1 January 2020	6.13
2020–2021	2	25 December 2020	1 January 2021	5.24
2021	1	29 October 2021		3.72
2021–2022	2	25 December 2021	1 January 2022	4.51
2022–2023	2	25 December 2022	1 January 2023	4.18
2023–2024	2	25 December 2023	1 January 2024	4.18
2024–2025	2	25 December 2024	1 January 2025	4.73
2025–2026	2	25 December 2025	1 January 2026	—

== International broadcast ==
The series is also broadcast in the United States (BBC America), Canada (BBC Canada), Québec (French version adapted for Super Écran under the title Mme Lebrun), New Zealand (TVNZ 1), South Africa, Iceland and Australia (Seven Network).

== Critical reception ==
Despite its high viewership, Mrs. Brown's Boys has received poor reviews from critics.

"The whole thing is entirely predicated on viewers finding a man dressed as a foul-mouthed elderly woman intrinsically funny", wrote Bernice Harrison, TV reviewer with The Irish Times. "If you do, you're away in a hack, and the viewing figures are astronomical, but if you don't, and you think that died out with Les Dawson and Dick Emery, then it's a long half-hour." The Irish Independent said that Mrs Brown's Boys was the type of TV programme "that makes you vaguely embarrassed to be Irish". Irish writer Graham Linehan has said he does not want his sitcom The Walshes to be compared with Mrs. Brown's Boys.

Outside Ireland, it has received similarly poor reviews. The Daily Telegraph's Sam Richards noted that the show's comedy has a "rudimentary nature", consisting of "an old-fashioned blend of silly voices and slapstick, played out in front of a live studio audience who collapse into giggles at the mere mention of the word "willy". Bruce Dessau in The Guardian described it as a "predictable, vulgar vehicle for Irish comedian Brendan O'Carroll", and in comparing it with other sitcoms said "No amount of 'fecks' are going to make Mrs Brown's Boys a classic like Father Ted". Grace Dent of The Independent remarked: "Once seen, it is rarely forgotten. To love Mrs Brown, one must be thrilled by a man in a hairnet and dinner lady tabard saying the F-word roughly once every ten minutes, egged on by a loyal studio audience so whipped to hysteria by him that one can hear pants being soiled and spleens exploding with mirth." Paul English of the Daily Record blasted the show as "lazy, end-of-pier trash rooted in the 1970s... One half-hour of this actually made me angry. Angry that the BBC seem to be abandoning quality in the pursuit of lowest common denominator ratings." Metro called it "jaw-droppingly past its sell-by date" and "not even remotely funny", saying that the BBC should "hang its head in shame" for showing "this RTÉ drivel".

=== Irish television ratings ===
Mrs. Brown's Boys was a ratings success upon its initial broadcast in Ireland. Every episode aired won its timeslot for RTÉ, with an average viewership of 753,500 in January 2011. One episode's rating beat that of RTÉ's own ratings giant The Late Late Show, with 856,000 viewers tuning in to watch. The 2011 Christmas episode was the most-watched TV show in Ireland over the holiday season, with a 48.6% audience share. A year later the show again topped the Christmas ratings with "The Virgin Mammy" gaining an average of 972,000 viewers and a 47% share, and "Mammy Christmas" gaining an average of 851,000 viewers and a 51% share.

== Awards and nominations ==
Institute	Award	Year	Results
British Academy Television Awards	Best Situation Comedy	2011	Nominated
Irish Film and Television Awards	Best Entertainment Programme	2012	Won
British Academy Television Awards	Best Situation Comedy	2012	Won
British Academy Television Awards	Best Male Performance in a Comedy for Brendan O'Carroll	2012	Nominated
TV Choice Awards	Best Comedy	2012	Won
British Academy Scottish Awards	Best Comedy Entertainment Programme	2012	Won
National Television Awards	Best Comedy	2013, 2014, 2015, 2017, 2020, 2024, 2026	Won x 3 consecutive years
Scottish RTS Awards	Best Comedy	2014	Nominated
BAFTA Awards	Best Male in a Comedy for Brendan O'Carroll	2014	Nominated
TV Choice Awards	Best Comedy	2024	Won

== Distribution ==
=== DVD and Blu-ray releases ===
More than one million copies of the first series of Mrs. Brown's Boys were sold on DVD in Ireland and the UK between October 2011 and February 2012. A complete series 1 and 2 box set was also released on 8 October 2012, containing the 2011 Christmas special as a content exclusive; this means that to own the special, one has to buy the box set.

Some of the episodes on the Series 1 DVD differ from their original broadcasts. Due to copyright issues, scenes where casts perform songs were edited out. These edits included a scene where Mrs Brown sings Altered Images' "Happy Birthday", the entire cast singing The Proclaimers song, "I'm Gonna Be (500 Miles)" in episode 3, and a scene in episode 6 where Buster sings the theme tune to Mission: Impossible. No changes have been made to the Series 2 episodes on their DVD release. A joke was made about being sued for singing a copyrighted song featured during the stage show Mrs Brown's Boys Live: Good Mourning Mrs Brown.

On 11 October 2012, Series 2 was released in Region 4 in both standard form and a limited edition. The limited-edition version contained the Christmas special. The Complete Collection was also released at the same time, containing all 13 episodes.

A US DVD release of the complete series (which will also contain the first 7 Christmas specials and the unaired pilot) was released on 3 November 2015.

In North America, NBCUniversal Syndication Studios handles distribution of the series while BBC Studios handles international distribution excluding North America.

Key
= Series
= Christmas / New Years specials
= Live shows
= Box sets

Title	# of disc(s)	Year	# of episodes	DVD release			Blu-ray release	
Title	# of disc(s)	Year	# of episodes	Region 1	Region 2	Region 4	Region B UK	Region B AU
Series One	2	2011	6	TBA	3 October 2011	1 August 2012	3 October 2011	1 August 2012
Series Two	2	2012	6	TBA	8 October 2012	11 October 2012	8 October 2012	11 October 2012
Good Mourning Mrs Brown: Live Tour	1	2012	Live show	TBA	12 November 2012	7 April 2016	12 November 2012	7 April 2016
Series 1, 2 & Christmas Special	5	2012	13	TBA	8 October 2012	11 October 2012	8 October 2012	TBA
Series Three	2	2012/13	6	TBA	4 March 2013	6 June 2013	4 March 2013	6 June 2013
Mrs Brown's Boys Christmas Crackers	1	2011/2012	3	TBA	7 October 2013	7 November 2013	7 October 2013	7 November 2013
Mrs Brown's Boys Big Box (Series 1–3 & 3 Christmas Specials)	7	2011–13	21	TBA	7 October 2013	7 November 2013	7 October 2013	TBA
Mrs Brown Rides Again: Live Tour	1	2012	Live show	TBA	11 November 2013	1 May 2014	11 November 2013	1 May 2014
For The Love of Mrs Brown: Live Tour	1	2013	Live show	TBA	17 November 2014	18 April 2018	17 November 2014	TBA
Mrs Brown's Boys: More Christmas Crackers	1	2013	2	TBA	6 October 2014	4 December 2014	6 October 2014	4 December 2014
Mrs Brown's Boys: Big Box of Crackers	2	2011–2013	5	TBA	20 October 2014	TBA	20 October 2014	TBA
Mrs Brown's Boys Live: Nice Big Box	3	2012–2014	3 Live Shows	TBA	17 November 2014	18 April 2018	17 November 2014	TBA
Mrs Brown's Boys; Complete Series	8	2011–14	25	3 November 2015	TBA	TBA	TBA	TBA
Mrs Brown's Boys: Mammy's Tickled Pink & Mammy's Gamble	1	2014–15	2	TBA	5 October 2015	5 November 2015	5 October 2015	5 November 2015
Mr's Brown's Boys: Christmas Cracker'd Big Box	4	2011–15	7	TBA	5 October 2015	5 November 2015	TBA	TBA
How Now Mrs Brown Cow: Live Tour		2015	Live show	TBA	30 November 2015	TBA	30 November 2015	TBA
Mrs Brown's Boys: Unplugged & Unleashed (Live Episode)	1	2016	1	TBA	10 October 2016	2 November 2016	TBA	TBA
Mrs Brown's Boys: Crackin' Christmas	1	2015–16	1	TBA	14 November 2016	16 November 2016	TBA	TBA
Mrs Brown's Boys: Cracking Big Box	4	2011–16	9	TBA	14 November 2016	16 November 2016	TBA	TBA
Mrs Brown's Boys: Christmas Treats	1	2016–17	2	TBA	13 November 2017	15 November 2017	TBA	TBA
Mrs Brown's Boys: Christmas Box	5	2011–16	11	TBA	13 November 2017	15 November 2017	TBA	TBA
Mrs Brown's Boys: Really Big Box (Series 1–3, 11 Christmas specials & live episode)	12	2011–16	30	TBA	13 November 2017	15 November 2017	TBA	TBA
Mrs Brown's Boys: Christmas Surprises	1	2017–18	2	TBA	12 November 2018	14 November 2018	TBA	TBA
Mrs Brown's Boys: Christmas Corkers	1	2018–19	2	TBA	11 November 2019	13 November 2019	TBA	TBA
Mrs Brown's Boys: Merry Mishaps	1	2019-2020	2	TBA	9 November 2020	11 November 2020	TBA	TBA
Mrs Brown's Boys: Festive Fancies	1	2020-2021	2	TBA	8 November 2021	10 November 2021	TBA	TBA
Mrs Brown's Boys: Very Merry Christmas Bundle	9	2012-2021	19	TBA	8 November 2021	TBA	TBA	TBA
Mrs Brown's Boys: Holly Jolly Jingles	1	2021-2022	3	TBA	7 November 2022	9 November 2022	TBA	TBA
Mrs Brown's Boys: Christmas Box of Treats	10	2012-2022	22	TBA	7 November 2022	TBA	TBA	TBA
Mrs. Brown's Boys - Tinsel Teasers	1	2022-2023	2	TBA	TBA	15 November 2023	TBA	TBA
Series Four	1	2023	4	TBA	10 June 2024	5 June 2024	TBA	TBA
TBA	TBA	2023-2024	2	TBA	TBA	TBA	TBA	TBA

=== iTunes releases ===
The first series of Mrs. Brown's Boys has been available on iTunes since 31 October 2011, including in High Definition. The two 2012 specials were released 11 November 2013. Additionally the Mrs. Brown's Boys Live Tour: Good Mourning Mrs Brown was also released 12 November 2012. Also, Mrs Brown's Boys Live Tour: Mrs Brown Rides Again was released on 11 November 2013. On 17 November 2014, Mrs. Brown's Boys Live Tour: For The Love of Mrs Brown was available to rent or buy.

=== Original series DVD releases ===
The original location films.

Title	Set details	DVD release dates
Title	Set details	Region 2
Mrs Brown's Boys	Discs: 1	10 April 2006
Mrs Brown's Boys 2 – The Last Wedding Part 2	Discs: 1	11 May 2006
Mrs Brown's Boys – Believe It or Not – Part 3	Discs: 1	4 September 2006
Mrs Brown's Boys – Good Mourning Mrs Brown – Part 4	Discs: 1	16 October 2006
Mrs Brown's Boys – 1 2 3 4	Discs: 4	23 October 2006
Mrs Brown's Boys – Triple Trouble! – Part 5	Discs: 1	
Mrs Brown's Boys – How Now Mrs. Brown – Part 6	Discs: 1	
Mrs Brown's Boys – The Seven Year Itch – Part 7	Discs: 1	
Mrs Brown's Boys – Mrs Brown's Bloomers	Discs: 1	18 October 2010
Mrs. Brown's Boys – The Original Series	Discs: 7	19 November 2010

== Spin-offs ==
=== Mrs. Brown's Boys D'Movie (2014) ===
A film adaption of the series entitled Mrs. Brown's Boys D'Movie was released in cinemas on 27 June 2014. BBC Films is acting as its sales agent. In January 2014, whilst speaking to the Radio Times, Brendan O'Carroll said "We're already working on a sequel – Mrs Brown's Boys D'Movie 2". In December 2015, it was confirmed that there will be a sequel.

In June 2014, it was announced that there would be two Mrs. Brown's Boys spin-off films. The first spin-off film is to be entitled Wash and Blow, set in the salon where Rory and Dino work. O'Carroll will write the film but rather than playing Mrs. Brown, he will star as the salon's owner, Mario. The second spin-off film in development is to be entitled Mr Wang, who is a character introduced in D'Movie. It was confirmed that English actor Burt Kwouk had been asked to take the title role but was unable to travel to Dublin, citing illness, so O'Carroll decided take on the role himself if the film gets produced. Kwouk died in 2016. It will also co-star Buster Brady and Dermot Brown working for him under a detective agency. It is currently not yet known when, or if, the spin-off films will be filmed nor released.

=== Tours ===
After starting the Ireland-only release of the original feature-length episodes, that would become known as "The Original Series", on DVD, the adapted for the stage version of Mrs. Brown's Boys began as a theatre show in 1999 performing across venues in Ireland, Scotland and the North of England. O'Carroll wrote three stage plays entitled Mrs Brown's Last Wedding, Good Mourning Mrs Brown and Mrs Brown Rides Again. These three stage shows formed part of the Mrs Brown Trilogy and was toured for several years. After playing to acceptable sized audiences across Ireland and the north of England, O'Carroll decided to write a fourth stage play entitled For the Love of Mrs. Brown in 2007 he then recorded the live show and made it available onto DVD via his own website in a bid to increase the popularity of the stage show. In 2009, O'Carroll then decided to write a fifth stage play entitled How Now Mrs Brown Cow which later toured in 2010.

Since the show was picked up by the BBC in 2011 as a TV series, O'Carroll has decided to re-tour all these shows across the UK. In March and April 2014, the live stage show Mrs. Brown Rides Again was performed in theatres across Australia. Brendan O'Carroll announced at the end of each performance of Mrs Brown Rides Again that the cast would be returning to Australia and New Zealand in January 2016 for various performances of the live stage show Good Mourning Mrs. Brown. On 30 June 2014, it was announced that How Now Mrs Brown Cow would tour UK arenas starting in March 2015. Tickets for the shows went on sale on 4 July 2014.

=== Television ===
In 2012, O'Carroll confirmed that a game show starring Mrs Brown was in development with production company 12 Yard called Mrs. Brown's Celebrities. A non-broadcast pilot was recorded in late 2012, A full series was due to be broadcast in 2013 but O'Carroll turned it down, stating that he did not need to water down the Mrs. Brown brand. The format was brought up again in 2014, this time entitled The Guess List with Rob Brydon now hosting the full series. O'Carroll has also confirmed that an animated version of the show is in development. In the Spring of 2012, O'Carroll turned down an offer to create a one-off special for HBO with the option of a full series if the show was well received as he wished to spend his time with family.

On 23 July 2016, Mrs. Brown's Boys had a one-off live episode, "Mammy Sutra", to celebrate 60 years of comedy on BBC. The show went live on BBC One and RTÉ One at 9:45 pm (BST) until 10:15 pm. The episode was then released on Mrs. Brown's Boys: Unplugged & Unleashed On Air Live DVD on 10 October 2016.

A new television chat show hosted by "Mrs. Brown" titled All Round to Mrs. Brown's began in March 2017. The show is hosted primarily by Brendan O'Carroll (as Mrs Brown) but also includes a segment titled 'The Cathy Brown Show' in which Cathy interviews celebrity guests in a talk-show like fashion. The show also heavily relies on audience participation with a member of the audiences 'Mammy' brought on set to participate in a game-show like segment. The show did not return in 2021 due to the COVID-19 pandemic, and in 2022, it was reported that the series had been cancelled.

During 2018, Brendan O'Carroll hosted a quiz show for the BBC called For Facts Sake as himself, with rotating members of the Mrs. Brown's Boys cast as team captains. The rest of the teams was made up from members of the audience.

=== Adaptations (television) ===
The television show has been adapted for francophone audiences in Canada as Madame Lebrun, with the lead role performed by Benoît Brière. The series has aired on Super Écran since 2015, with five seasons to date. Having surpassed the original series in number of episodes produced, the series has now transitioned from translating the original series to writing new original episodes. The show has been also adapted for the audiences in Greece as Super Mammy and began aired on 3 April 2022, on ANT1, with the lead role performed by Markos Seferlis. This show was also adapted in Czech Republic as PanMáma and has aired on TV Nova back in 2013, with the lead role performed by Milan Šteindler.

== Crossover ==
The show crossed paths with the Madea franchise by Tyler Perry in the 2022 movie, A Madea Homecoming with Brendan O'Carroll and Jennifer Gibney reprising their roles as Agnes and Cathy Brown respectively.
