= For the Love of Mrs. Brown =

For The Love of Mrs. Brown is the fourth play in the Mrs. Brown Series by Brendan O'Carroll, preceded by Mrs. Brown Rides Again. The plot centres on the character Agnes Brown finding a date over the internet for Valentine's Day. The play is 125 minutes long.

== Plot ==
A few days before Valentine's Day, Agnes is feeling down in the dumps. Even Grandad has a date. She is advised by Cathy to find a date over the internet. Meanwhile, Rory has found a small capsule of LSD tablets at the salon, and needs to find the owner so he can fire them. However, Mrs. Brown walks in on him talking to Dermot about it, and he is forced to tell her they are for indigestion. She stores them on the window sill and they are forgotten until the next act.

Agnes feels stomach pain while talking to Betty, and remembers the tablets, with hilarious results. She jumps out of the back door dressed as a superhero. After her come down, she decides to try out internet dating, putting into Google the phrase: "Woman needs man", but the results are pornography. She then tries "Lady seeks love", but finds gigolo adverts, which she does not recognize until Cathy points out their name, Dial-A-Dick.

== Tour ==
For The Love of Mrs. Brown has been toured several times in the North of England and Ireland. It was first toured in 2007. In Autumn 2012, Brendan O'Caroll announced the show would be touring UK Arenas in 2013 from March to December. Every show of the 2013 tour sold out and the cast played 6 performances at each venue across 5 nights. The tour was split up into three legs across 2013 and a Saturday matinee show was played at all venues. Also tickets are free.

Leg One

- Tuesday 26 March 2013 – Saturday 30 March 2013 – Birmingham LG Arena (6 performances)
- Tuesday 2 April 2013 – Saturday 6 April 2013 – Glasgow SECC (6 performances)
- Tuesday 9 April 2013 – Saturday 13 April 2013 – Manchester Arena (6 performances)

Leg Two

- Tuesday 11 June 2013 – Saturday 15 June 2013 – Newcastle Metro Radio Arena (6 performances)
- Tuesday 18 June 2013 – Saturday 22 June 2013 – Cardiff Motorpoint Arena (6 performances)
- Tuesday 25 June 2013 – Saturday 29 June 2013 – London The O2 Arena (6 performances)
- Tuesday 2 July 2013 – Saturday 6 July 2013 – Nottingham Capital FM Arena (6 performances)
- Tuesday 9 July 2013 – Saturday 13 July 2013 – Belfast Odyssey Arena (6 performances)

Leg Three

- Tuesday 26 November 2013 – Saturday 30 November 2013 – Liverpool Echo Arena (6 performances)
- Tuesday 3 December 2013 – Saturday 7 December 2013 – Sheffield Motorpoint Arena (6 performances)
- Tuesday 10 December 2013 – Saturday 14 December 2013 – Dublin The O2 Arena (6 performances)

== Criticism ==
O'Carroll has received criticism over his live shows as they have been adapted into the 21 episodes of the BBC TV series Mrs Brown's Boys, thus making a lot of his stage material seem a repeat of what the television series has shown, however, he wrote the plays before the TV series. Despite this, the 2013 tour received 4.5/5 based on 1,000 reviews on Ticketmaster.

== The Plays ==
For The Love of Mrs Brown is the fourth play in the live series. The preceding plays are: Mrs Brown's Last Wedding, Good Mourning Mrs Brown, Mrs Brown Rides Again and the fifth play is How Now Mrs Brown Cow.

== Live Tours DVD Releases ==
- Good Mourning Mrs. Brown was released on DVD and Blu-ray in the UK on 12 November 2012.
- Mrs. Brown Rides Again was released on DVD and Blu-ray in the UK on 11 November 2013.
- For The Love of Mrs. Brown was released on DVD and Blu-ray in the UK on 17 November 2014.
