= 21st Century Child =

- Directed by: Lavinia Darby
- Presented by: David Coleman
- Country of origin: Ireland
- Original language: English
- No. of series: 3
- No. of episodes: 11

Production
- Executive producer: Adrian Lynch
- Producer: Liz Faulkner
- Production location: Around Ireland
- Editor: Paul Giles

Original release
- Network: RTÉ One
- Release: 7 April 2008 – 2010

Related
- Families in Trouble; Teens in the Wild

21st Century Child is an RTÉ television programme which follows children with cameras. It is presented by David Coleman, a practising clinical psychologist. It began on 7 April 2008. A second series began airing from 2 November 2009.

21st Century Child is similar to the BBC shows 7UP, originating in 1964, and Child of Our Time, originating in 2000.

== Format ==
In 2007, RTÉ television began following 12 newborn children and their families. It continued to do so in the years that followed.

In the first series, viewers were introduced to the participating families. In the first episode, two babies were scheduled to be born, with a third baby unexpectedly born. Other babies were born in the second and third episodes of the first series, and by episode four all the relevant babies had been born.

In the second series, the program revisited several of the families, with several episodes focusing on relationship difficulties, perceived bad behaviour, and a potential relocation to another country.

In the third series, themes included the impact of depression on parenting, lone-parenting and stay at home fathers,
