= Davis at Large =

- Genre: Light entertainment
- Presented by: Derek Davis
- Country of origin: Ireland
- Original language: English
- No. of series: 2

Production
- Production locations: Studio 1, RTÉ Television Centre, Donnybrook, Dublin 4
- Camera setup: Multi-camera
- Running time: 40–60 minutes

Original release
- Network: RTÉ One
- Release: 2 November 1984 – 23 February 1986

Davis at Large is an Irish variety and chat show which was presented by Derek Davis. The studio-based show aired on Friday nights, and later on Sunday nights, between 2 November 1984 and 23 February 1986.

== Production ==
Davis at Large was broadcast live from Studio 1 in the RTÉ Television Centre at Donnybrook, Dublin 4. As RTÉ's biggest at the time, the studio held 120 audience members.
