= Andrea Roche =

Irish model

- Born: Ireland
- Known for: Miss Ireland 1998; Miss Universe 1998 (Top 10); Miss World 1997
- Spouse: Rob White
- Modeling information
- Height: 5 ft 8 in (1.73 m)
- Hair color: Black
- Eye color: Green
- Agency: www.armodelagency.com

Andrea Roche is an Irish entrepreneur, former model, and beauty pageant title holder.

Roche won Miss Ireland 1998 and competed in Miss Universe 1998.

Roche retired from modelling in 2008, and took part in the RTÉ One reality sports television series Celebrity Bainisteoir in 2009, and featured on a weekly basis on the TV3 show Ireland AM.

Roche founded AR Modelling Agency in 2010, and she branched into influencer talent management from 2013.

== Career ==
Roche began her career as a model and as Miss Ireland, Andrea competed in the 1998 Miss Universe pageant. Roche is beauty editor with VIP and fashion editor of South East Wedding magazine and appears on TV3's Ireland AM as their fashion expert. Roche reduced her modelling to dedicate more time to the Miss Universe Ireland pageant.

She had been described as "a great beauty" by veteran broadcaster Derek Davis, and as both "a recession-busting beauty" and "Ireland's greatest beauty" by the Irish Independent.

== Awards ==
Roche won the VIP Most Stylish Woman award at the VIP Style Awards in 2008.

== Personal life ==
Roche grew up in Clonmel, County Tipperary. She sat her Leaving Certificate at Rockwell College after attending the Loreto Secondary School. Roche moved to Carlow to do Business Studies at the local Regional Technical College, then moved to Dublin to pursue modelling.

In December 2011, Roche got engaged to businessman Rob White at the Eiffel Tower in Paris. They married in Ibiza in 2012 surrounded by friends and family. In September 2013 it was announced that Andrea was expecting her first child. Andrea gave birth a daughter, Sophie in March 2014.
