= How Now Mrs Brown Cow =

How Now Mrs Brown Cow is the fourth and final play in the Mrs. Brown Series by Brendan O'Carroll, preceded by For The Love of Mrs. Brown. The plot centres on the character Agnes Brown getting her family prepared in the run up to Christmas. The play is 120 minutes long as of June 2015 (With half an hour interval in between)

== Plot ==
It's just weeks to go to Christmas in the Brown house. The turkey is getting plucked and Grandad is getting stuffed (Or is that the other way around). Agnes is excited because her son Trevor whom she has not seen in five years has promised to pay a Christmas Visit home. However Cathy returns from her trip to America with unwelcome news, but who will tell Mammy? Rory Brown is distraught because his partner Dino has tried to drown him, Mark and Betty do their best to keep everybody calm, while nobody is sure what to do about Winnie's big box or Granddad‘s little hamster.

== Tour ==
How Now Mrs Brown Cow was originally toured in the North of England and Ireland in 2010. In June 2014, Brendan O'Carroll announced that How Now Mrs Brown Cow would tour across the UK from March 2015 to December 2015. It has also been announced that the tour will include a Saturday matinee show at every venue.

The 2015 Tour Dates: Leg One

- Tuesday 24 March 2015 - Saturday 28 March 2015 - Birmingham LG Arena (6 performances)
- Tuesday 31 March 2015 - Saturday 4 April 2015 - Glasgow The SSE Hydro (6 performances)
- Tuesday 7 April 2015 - Saturday 11 April 2015 - Manchester Phones 4u Arena (6 performances)

Leg Two

- Tuesday 9 June 2015 - Saturday 13 June 2015 - Newcastle Metro Radio Arena (6 performances)
- Tuesday 16 June 2015 - Saturday 20 June 2015 - Cardiff Motorpoint Arena (6 performances)
- Tuesday 23 June 2015 - Saturday 27 June 2015 - Leeds First Direct Arena (6 performances)
- Tuesday 30 June 2015 - Saturday 4 July 2015 - Nottingham Capital FM Arena (6 performances)
- Tuesday 7 July 2015 - Saturday 11 July 2015 - London The O2 Arena (6 performances)

Leg Three

- Wednesday 16 September 2015 - Glasgow The SSE Hydro (Live DVD Recording)
- Tuesday 24 November 2015 - Saturday 28 November 2015 - Liverpool Echo Arena (6 performances)
- Tuesday 1 December 2015 - Saturday 5 December 2015 - Sheffield Motorpoint Arena (6 performances)
- Tuesday 8 December 2015 - Saturday 12 December 2015 - Belfast Odyssey Arena (6 performances)
- Tuesday 15 December 2015 - Saturday 19 December 2015 - Dublin The O2 Arena (6 performances)

== Criticism ==
O'Caroll has received criticism over his live shows as they have been adapted into the 23 episodes of the BBC TV series Mrs Brown's Boys, thus making a lot of his stage material seem a repeat of what the television series has shown, however, he wrote the plays before the TV series. Despite this, the 2013 tour received 4.5/5 based on 1,000 reviews on Ticketmaster.

== The Plays ==
How Now Mrs Brown Cow is the fourth play in the live series. The preceding plays are: Good Mourning Mrs Brown, Mrs Brown Rides Again and For the Love of Mrs. Brown.

== Live Tours DVD Releases ==
- Good Mourning Mrs. Brown was released on DVD and Blu-ray in the UK on 12 November 2012.
- Mrs. Brown Rides Again was released on DVD and Blu-ray in the UK on 11 November 2013.
- For The Love Of Mrs. Brown was released on DVD and Blu-ray in the UK on 17 November 2014.
- How Now Mrs Brown Cow was released on DVD and Blu-Ray in the UK on 30 November 2015.
