= Mark Hamilton (doctor) =

British doctor (born 1970)

- Born: 30 October 1970 (age 55); Bangor, Northern Ireland
- Presenting career
- Show: How Long Will You Live?
- Station: RTÉ One
- Country: United Kingdom
- Previous show: The Surgery

Mark Hamilton (born 30 October 1970) is an Irish physician and broadcaster. He is presenter of How Long Will You Live? on RTÉ One and former presenter of The Surgery on BBC Radio 1.

== Education and medical training ==
Hamilton graduated from medical school with an MB ChB (Bachelor of Medicine and Surgery). He then went on to specialize in several fields such as Orthopedic surgery, Geriatric medicine and Anaesthetics, and lectured Anatomy and Biomedical Sciences at the University of Manchester. In 2007, Hamilton worked in an A&E in Withington as a registrar. He is currently training as a general practitioner at Lockside Medical Centre in Stalybridge.

== Media career ==
Hamilton joined Radio 1 in 1999, jointly hosting the Surgery with Sara Cox. Since then Hamilton has co-presented with Emma B, Letitia, Annie Mac and Kelly Osbourne. He appeared on a Channel 4 series helping teenagers relieve stress entitled Chill Out.
