= How Long Will You Live? =

Irish television series

- Genre: Lifestyle
- Created by: Waddell Media
- Starring: Mark Hamilton
- Country of origin: Ireland
- Original language: English

Production
- Running time: 30 minutes

Original release
- Network: RTÉ One

Related
- Fair City; RTÉ News: Nine O'Clock

How Long Will You Live? is a television series broadcast on RTÉ One. Presented by Mark Hamilton, each week Hamilton examines a different individual with an unhealthy lifestyle, estimates their lifespan and attempts to increase that lifespan by implementing his own techniques into a plan to improve that person's lifestyle. A fourth series began airing on 7 January 2009. The series is sponsored by Flora.

== Episode list ==
=== Series one ===
The first series contained six episodes.

Date	Featured person	Link
	Stephen Good	Stephen Good
	Frank Sweeney	Frank Sweeney
	Geraldine Patten	Geraldine Patten
	Marian Devereaux	Marian Devereaux
	Paul Losty	Paul Losty
	Breege Geoghegan	Breege Geoghegan

=== Series two ===
The second series contained eight episodes. The eight unhealthy individuals were revisited before the fourth series and their progress was filmed for a series titled How Long Will You Live? Revisited. One of these was a priest.

Date	Featured person	Ref	
	Gary Rooney	Gary Rooney	Revisited
	Kathryn O'Dwyer	Kathryn O'Dwyer	Revisited
	Michael Masterson	Michael Masterson	Revisited
	Diane Leen	Diane Leen	Revisited
	Fr Vinny Connaughton	Fr Vinny Connaughton	Revisited
	Angela Byrne	Angela Byrne	Revisited
	John Keane	John Keane	Revisited
	Mary O'Neill		Revisited

=== Series three ===
The third series contained ten episodes. Two couples featured in series three, meaning that twelve unhealthy individuals were featured overall. The third series saw the programme become more multicultural by featuring an unhealthy individual who was originally from Nigeria and another unhealthy individual who was originally from a small village in southern India.

Date	Featured person	Ref
	Rebecca Brady	Rebecca Brady
	Irene Winters	Irene Winters
	Thywill Bankole	Thywill Bankole
	Willie Carter	Willie Carter
	Paul and Mary Nolan	Paul and Mary Nolan
	Colum McGrath	Colum McGrath
	Antoinette and Kelly McLoughlin	Antoinette and Kelly McLoughlin
	Gaye Healy	Gaye Healy
	Jagadeesh Dharmapuri	Jagadeesh Dharmapuri
	Dave McCarthy	Dave McCarthy
