= Teens in the Wild =

Irish documentary television series

- Genre: Observational documentary
- Created by: Sam Donkey
- Starring: David Coleman
- Country of origin: Ireland
- Original language: English
- No. of series: 2
- No. of episodes: 4 (series 1)

Production
- Producer: Christine Thornton

Original release
- Network: RTÉ One
- Release: 2 February 2009

Related
- Families in Trouble; 21st Century Child

Teens in the Wild is an Irish observational documentary television series broadcast on RTÉ One. The series was presented by the clinical psychologist David Coleman, who previously appeared in the television series Families in Trouble.

The first series, broadcast in four parts over four weeks, followed six male teenagers, each with their own individual behavioural difficulties, as they undertook a three-week activity programme at Delphi Adventure in Connemara, County Galway during September 2008. It commenced broadcasting on 2 February 2009, airing each Monday at 21:30. The series producer, Christine Thornton, was reported as stating that the series would demonstrate "often dramatic and emotional insights" in relation to teenaged behaviour.

The camp was declared a "once-off" experience by Coleman in a live web chat held on RTÉ.ie on 11 February 2009. He also claimed that he would be open to doing a similar series involving teenage girls, since this one involved boys exclusively. To supplement the show, Coleman initiated a regular slot focusing on teenage issues each Wednesday on the daytime television programme, Seoige.

A second series aired in 2010, this time involving an all female cast.

== Show history ==
=== Series one ===
Six male teenagers took part in the first series of Teens in the Wild.

Fifteen-year-old Mikey from County Westmeath has a habit of being verbally abusive both at home and in school. He has been known to unexpectedly disappear for several hours on numerous occasions. He is regularly involved in street brawls. Fifteen-year-old Jamie O’Herlihy from County Cork has been suspended from school on numerous occasions and regularly engages in disputes with her own mother. Jamie came out as transgender in 2016 Fifteen-year-old William from Castlebar, County Mayo, is regularly involved in street fighting and has been told he may be permanently excluded from school. Fifteen-year-old Kyle from Tralee, County Kerry, is unmotivated and this presents difficulties at school. Sixteen-year-old Noel from Dublin has a quick temper, is regularly in trouble with his parents and seems to have difficulty recognising authority. Fifteen-year-old Shane from County Kildare was a former a high achiever in school but has in the past year left without offering an explanation.

=== Series two ===
RTÉ are currently requesting a new batch of troubled teenagers to come forward to feature in a second series. It has been reported that they are all in fact to be females.

The second series of Teens in the Wild began in 2010.

The Irish Times reviewer Kevin Courtney noted the return of Coleman to Irish television screens as "the agony uncle to another group of troubled teenagers, this time six girls with enough collective baggage to sink the Titanic".

== Reception ==
Whilst reaction from participants in the web chat which followed series one was generally positive, some media outlets gave a negative response to the show. The Irish Independent noted the genre which the series placed itself in as being an "observational documentary" as opposed to reality television and questioned how the young people involved in the show could cope with their personal traumas in front of the cameras and general public.

== See also ==
- Brat Camp
