= Katherine Lynch =

Irish television personality

- Born: 1973; Mohill, County Leitrim, Ireland
- Notable work: Katherine Lynch's Working Girls; Katherine Lynch's Wonderwomen; An Audience with Katherine Lynch; Celebrity Bainisteoir; Katherine Lynch's Single Ladies

Comedy career
- Medium: Stand-up and television
- Genres: Satire sketch

Katherine Lynch (born 1973) is an Irish television personality from County Leitrim. She has had several television series broadcast on RTÉ Two, with titles like Working Girls, Wonderwomen and Single Ladies. Lynch also participated as a bainisteoir in the second series of the RTÉ One's Celebrity Bainisteoir. She is said to have established a following among the Irish gay community.

== Career ==
Lynch began her career as part of the Irish gay scene. This part of her career included winning Miss Alternative Ireland in 1998 as "Tampy Lillette" (a skit on Country & Western singer Tammy Wynette, with each costume trimmed with tampons. She went on to star as Busty Lycra in her regular Thursday night show in GUBU Bar in her show G Spot, with a variety of guest "artists". Meyler and Lynch adapted their characters for television and produced three shows; Katherine Lynch's Working Girls, Katherine Lynch's Wonderwomen and An Audience with Katherine Lynch.

Katherine Lynch's Working Girls was her first television series. The three-part series was broadcast on RTÉ Two on Tuesday nights in January 2008. The series featured three of Lynch's characters; Singin' Bernie Walsh, Sheila Sheik and Busty Lycra. The comedian described it as a "hybrid" series, featuring both sketches and interaction with the general public. The Irish Independent referred to it as being "in the spirit of the 'comedy of cringe' vein which is so in vogue".

Katherine Lynch's Wonderwomen began airing on 20 October 2008. It was the first production by WAKA TV, a company established by Lynch and Myler. The six-part series focused on the exploits of four characters, Singin' Bernie Walsh, Sheila Sheik and two new characters, Liz Hurley and Dalkey Dunphy Davenport.

An Audience with Katherine Lynch followed this in December 2008, described by Irish Independent critic John Boland as "an hour-long show in which Katherine Lynch's ego was allowed to run rampant in front of an audience of minor celebrities."

Lynch was a bainisteoir in the second series of Celebrity Bainisteoir in 2009. She managed Dromahair GAA in Leitrim, claiming that the passion she felt for her county was her motivation to take part in the show. Dromahair competed against the George Hook-managed Cuala GAA of Dalkey, County Dublin in the tournament's quarter-final. Upon reaching the final, she appeared alongside her opponent Derek Davis on Tubridy Tonight.

A 2009 DVD outsold efforts by Neil Delamere and PJ Gallagher, though did not manage to outsell Des Bishop.

Her series Katherine Lynch's Single Ladies began in January 2010, achieving a 29 per cent audience share for its first episode which featured nudity and an encounter with footballer Cristiano Ronaldo. Lynch appeared on The Cafe on 8 January 2010 before the show began in order to promote it.

== Characters ==
Lynch is known for her multiplicity of characters and her confusion over which one is her personal favourite. When asked by the Irish Independent which was her favourite she initially declared it was "like asking a woman to pick her favourite child" but when prompted chose Liz Hurley, described as a "sexually confused small-town girl of 35 who still lives at home with the Mammy, coaches the local ladies' GAA team, plays bass in small-town AC/DC Tribute act 50-50". Lynch's other characters include a resurrected version of eighty-foot supermodel Busty Lycra, portrayed as a foot fetish model and porn star from Northern Ireland who returns from Los Angeles when her career is destroyed by a verucca in her own foot. When Lynch walked down Dublin's Thomas Street in the guise of Busty Lycra, she was stopped on many occasions by people asking for her identity, with some people believing she was Mr Pussy. Lycra featured in Working Girls but was removed from Wonderwomen amidst concerns about perceived rudeness expressed by RTÉ. According to the RTÉ Guide, Bernie Walsh—another of Lynch's creations—is her favourite character. Walsh is a country and western singer with an album, Friends in Hi Aces, featuring songs such as "Start Packin' the Van (Dundalk, Dundalk)", "My Van" and "Stand By Your Van", to sell. Sheila Sheik is a female bellydancer from Tallaght, County Dublin, with an Egyptian husband. Dalkey Dunphy Davenport is a teenage blogger from Ballsbridge who streams live online from her hotel suite in Dublin. Dunphy Davenport is described as "the Peaches Geldof-obsessed mall rat with the orange perma-tan, the fluorescent smile, the 3 inch false eye-lashes and the thousand euro handbag who... 'ooooh my gawd is just loike soooooooo booooored!'".

== Personal life ==
Lynch is from Mohill in County Leitrim and has repeatedly claimed to have been "nurtured by drag queens".

Lynch's father is from County Kerry and she has a strong GAA background, with former Kerry footballer and manager Páidí Ó Sé being one of her cousins. Persistent rumours fuelled by the RTÉ Guide had her as granddaughter of the acclaimed Irish poet Patrick Kavanagh. Revelations concerning her links to the Marxist revolutionary Che Guevara were also discussed on RTÉ Radio 1 by songwriter, Shay Healy. This comes about through her connections to the Galwegian Patrick Lynch and his relatives who also include the naval officer Patricio Lynch, and the writers Benito Lynch and Adolfo Bioy Casares.

Lynch currently resides in Kilmainham, a suburb of Dublin. Long-term friends, who include the singer Brian Kennedy and the television presenter Brendan Courtney, often visit to watch her television shows with her. Lynch's preferred radio station is RTÉ lyric fm, which she listens to for its music. Lynch describes herself as "a bit minimalistic as regards possessions", donating most of her music collection (which included Adam Ant and Alison Moyet) to Oxfam when she moved house.
