= Derek Davis =

Northern Irish broadcaster (1948–2015)

- Born: 26 April 1948; Bangor, County Down, Northern Ireland
- Died: 13 May 2015 (aged 67); Dublin, Ireland
- Occupation: Broadcaster

Derek Davis (26 April 1948 – 13 May 2015) was an Irish broadcaster from Bangor. On television, he co-hosted Live at 3, presented Davis at Large and Out of the Blue and won Celebrity Bainisteoir.

== Early life ==
Davis was born in Bangor, County Down to a Protestant father and a Catholic mother (a native of Bray, County Wicklow). He attended Garron Tower, a Catholic boarding school near Carnlough in County Antrim, and described his early childhood as ecumenical. He acquired a love of boats which later provided the inspiration for the TV series Out of the Blue (1998). Davis later studied law at Queen's University Belfast.

== Television ==
Davis started as a news reporter with the American network ABC and BBC Northern Ireland before spending 11 years in the newsroom in RTÉ. In the early 1980s he became a newsreader for The Six-o-clock News and began to become well known due to his sometimes off-the cuff comments on news stories.

Davis impersonated Big Tom on the RTÉ satirical programme Hall's Pictorial Weekly. He was offered a part in a show-band in Cork as a result of this. After a ballroom tour, he joined RTÉ proper in 1975, initially to work as a television news reporter, eventually becoming newsreader on the nine o'clock news.

In the mid-1980s, Davis hosted his own talk show, Davis at Large. It was on this show, which was screened live, that he was attacked and hurled across the studio by a guest female body builder. In addition to this he had an interactive summer current affairs show, simply called Davis. In 1986, he began co-hosting (with Thelma Mansfield) RTÉ 1's afternoon programme Live at 3, a role he would fill for eleven years.

Davis presented the Rose of Tralee twice in 1995 and 1996, the first of these when Gay Byrne was taken ill at short notice. He memorably thanked the providers of the air conditioning while wiping sweat from his brow. Live at 3 came to an end in 1997. Nearly 15 years later, Thelma Mansfield said, "They wanted to get rid of the old faces and bring in some new ones". From 1997, Davis presented a marine magazine programme, Out of the Blue, until 2001.

In 2005, he hosted a show called Time on Their Hands, a travel series for older people. One of his last television appearances was on the second season of Celebrity Bainisteoir in 2009, in which he and seven other Irish celebrities managed an intermediate Gaelic football club team from their home county in an official GAA tournament. Davis's team won the tournament. He and eventual runner-up Katherine Lynch appeared together on Tubridy Tonight the evening before the final was broadcast.

During the 2010s, Davis made frequent guest appearances on TV3's Tonight with Vincent Browne, where he and another guest would preview the following morning's papers.

== Radio ==
In 2000, Davis presented a radio quiz show called A Question of Food. During the summer season he had taken over RTÉ Radio 1's mid-morning slot usually occupied by Today with Pat Kenny, and he also hosted the radio phone-in show, Liveline, when regular presenter Joe Duffy was on holiday. Later, he presented Sunday Magazine with Davis on 4 on 4fm.

On 10 May 2015, Davis spoke on the topic of obesity on Marian Finucane's Sunday radio show (presented that day by Áine Lawlor). Lawlor introduced Davis by remarking on his own substantial recent weight loss: "You look, you are literally, I'd say, about a third of the man that you used to be."

A short illness followed and Davis died three days later, aged 67. His funeral took place in the Victorian Chapel, Mount Jerome, Harold's Cross, Dublin.

== Awards ==
Davis won two Jacob's Awards for his television work. In 1984, he received his first award for the series The Season That's in It. He won his second award in 1991 for his co-presenting of Live at 3.

Media offices
Preceded by Gay Byrne	Host of The Rose of Tralee; 1995 – 1996	Succeeded by Marty Whelan
