= Punam Krishan =

Scottish doctor and author (born 1983)

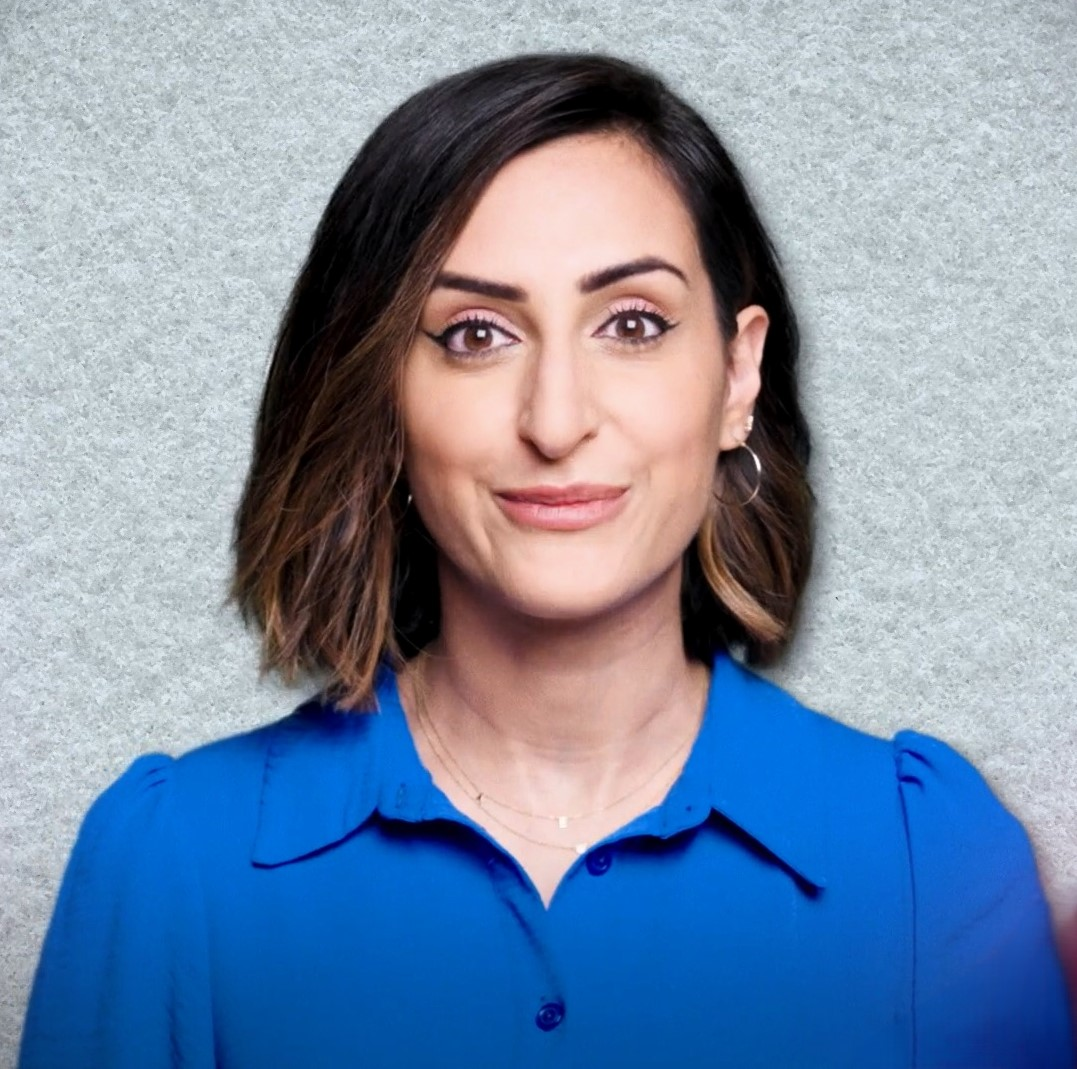
- Krishan in 2021
- Born: 28 May 1983 (age 43); Glasgow, Scotland
- Employer(s): BBC; NHS
- Television: Laid Bare; Morning Live; Strictly Come Dancing
- Medical career
- Sub-specialties: general practice
- Notable works: Laid Bare

Punam Krishan (born 28 May 1983) is a Scottish doctor, TV personality, and author. Born in Glasgow, she married Sandesh Gulhane and took a post at a medical partnership but left after burning out and became a locum general practitioner (GP). She has presented the BBC Scotland series Laid Bare, appeared on Morning Live and The Weakest Link, and written a Glasgow Times medical column and children's book. In 2024, she placed eleventh on the twenty-second series of Strictly Come Dancing with her professional dance partner Gorka Márquez.

== Life and career ==
Punam Krishan was born 28 May 1983 in Glasgow, and grew up in a small tenement flat with her younger sister and extended family. Her father owned a corner shop. Her parents moved from Kapurthala in Punjab to Scotland in the late 1970s, where they had an arranged marriage. Punam has stated that she was "raised in equal parts on curry and Irn-Bru" and that education was important to her family, with her parents taking the view that she was either going to become a "doctor, lawyer, accountant, or a failure".

Krishan went to Hillhead Primary School, Notre Dame High School, and the University of Glasgow, where she studied medicine for ten years. She failed her third-year exams the first time round and had to retake them. In 2011, she married Sandesh Gulhane, another doctor, who went on to become a Member of the Scottish Parliament and the health spokesman for the Scottish Conservative Party. She spent six years working as a general practitioner before burning out and taking a post as a locum (a substitute for a physician).

In January 2019, Krishan went viral after tweeting an exchange between her practice's receptionist and a racist patient. In June of 2019, Krishnan started collaborating with BBC The Social, a talent development project, by BBC Scotland. Her content on The Social quickly gained traction and was shared widely across social media platforms. That October, Krishan began presenting Laid Bare for BBC Scotland, in which patients were given a comprehensive medical check-up and then interrogated by Krishan. Writing that month, Susan Swarbrick described her interrogations as "a living post-mortem". During the COVID-19 pandemic in the United Kingdom, Krishan wrote for the Glasgow Times each week about health and her experiences as a doctor.

"Each spread addresses a key question. What do doctors do? Why do we need them? What character traits are essential for health care, and how can kids try to develop those skills? How are doctors trained? What happens if you get sick?"

— Kirkus Reviews talking about How to Be a Doctor and Other Life-Saving Jobs in 2025

By October 2021, she had begun making appearances on BBC Radio Scotland and Morning Live; she became the latter's resident GP. She published a children's book the following year, How to Be a Doctor and Other Life-Saving Jobs. The book explains various medical roles and contains a timeline running from 2600 BC China to the COVID-19 pandemic. Reviewing a 2025 re-release, Kirkus Reviews wrote that the text was streamlined by "attractive, color-blocked illustrations" and noted that the book portrayed healthcare workers as "diverse in skin tone, ability, and hair color and texture". Krishan appeared as a contestant on The Weakest Link in December 2022.

In August 2024, she was announced as a contestant on the twenty-second series of Strictly Come Dancing, where she and Gorka Márquez comprised one of fifteen pairs that year. Her 5 October performance to "Bhole Chudiye" from the film Kabhi Khushi Kabhie Gham marked the first time a contestant had performed a traditional Bollywood dance on the programme, though Will Young and Karen Clifton had previously performed to The Pussycat Dolls' "Jai Ho! (You Are My Destiny)", which sampled Bollywood music by A. R. Rahman. She and Márquez were eliminated fifth on 27 October after losing a unanimous vote against Shayne Ward and Nancy Xu, coming eleventh overall. Krishan returned to Morning Live in November and to Strictly for its series final.

In January 2025, Dorling-Kindersley published You and Your Body, a flapboard book by Krishan about human anatomy. You and Your Body was one of two children's books by Krishan they had commissioned in April 2024 for publication in 2025, the other being the first aid book A Superhero's First Aid Manual, which was published in August. Krishan opened a spa at the Gleddoch House Hotel & Golf Club in July and became a patron of the breast cancer charity House of Hope in October. The latter followed her own diagnosis of the condition, for which she subsequently completed treatment.
