= Strictly Come Dancing series 22 =

Strictly Come Dancing
- Series 22
- Presented by: Tess Daly; Claudia Winkleman
- Judges: Shirley Ballas; Anton Du Beke; Motsi Mabuse; Craig Revel Horwood
- Celebrity winner: Chris McCausland
- Professional winner: Dianne Buswell
- No. of episodes: 25

Release
- Original network: BBC One
- Original release: 14 September – 14 December 2024

Series chronology
- ← Previous; Series 21 Next → Series 23

Strictly Come Dancing returned for its twenty-second series with a launch show on 14 September 2024 on BBC One, with the live shows beginning on 21 September. A special episode to commemorate the programme's twentieth anniversary was also confirmed. Tess Daly and Claudia Winkleman returned as hosts, whilst Janette Manrara and Fleur East returned to host Strictly Come Dancing: It Takes Two. Craig Revel Horwood, Motsi Mabuse, Shirley Ballas and Anton Du Beke returned to the judging panel for their 22nd, 6th, 8th, and 4th series respectively.

Comedian Chris McCausland and his partner Dianne Buswell were announced as the winners on 14 December, while Sarah Hadland and Vito Coppola, JB Gill and Lauren Oakley, and Tasha Ghouri and Aljaž Škorjanec were the runners-up.

== Format ==
Hosts and Judges for Strictly Come Dancing Series 22

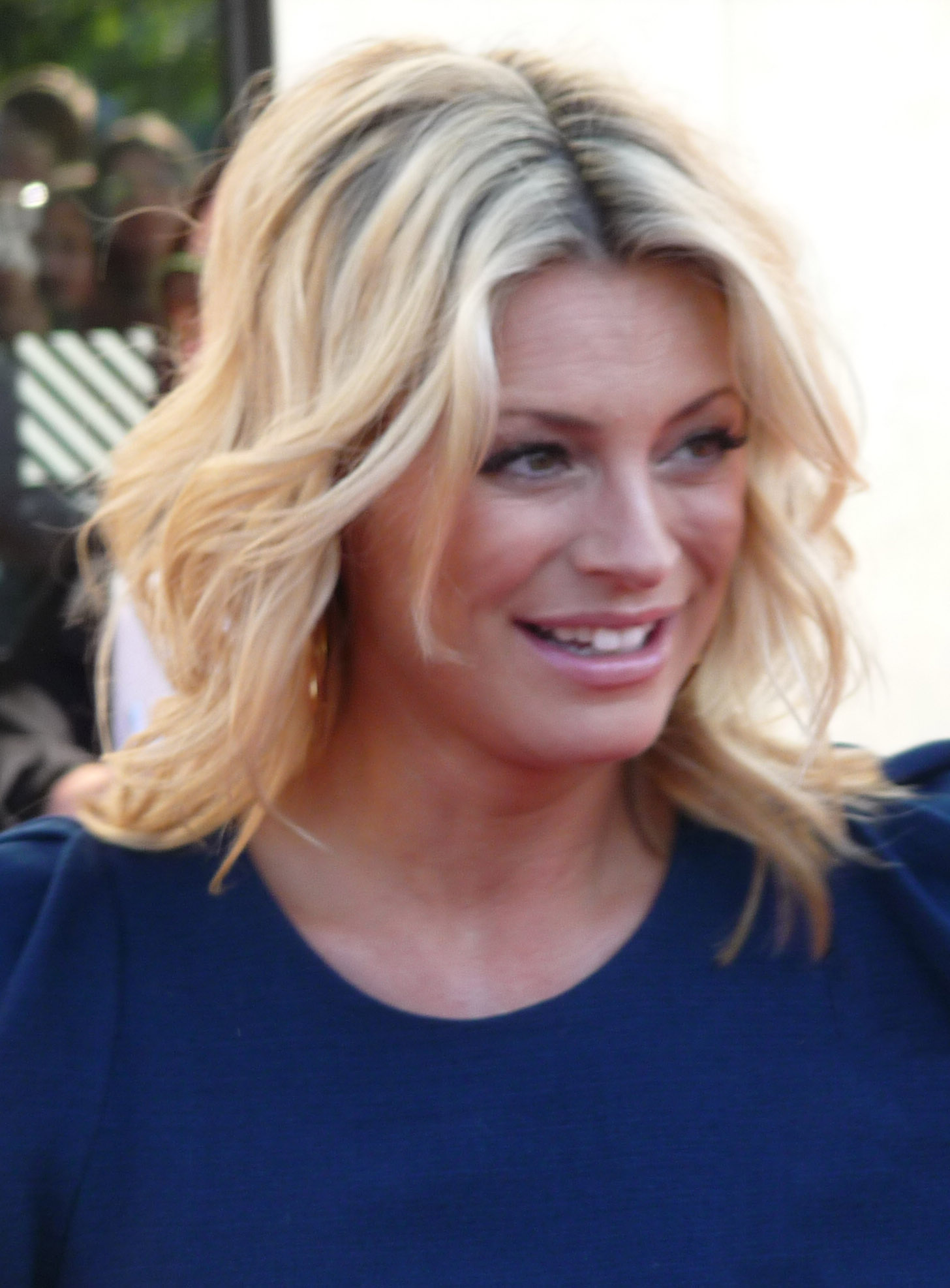
Tess Daly

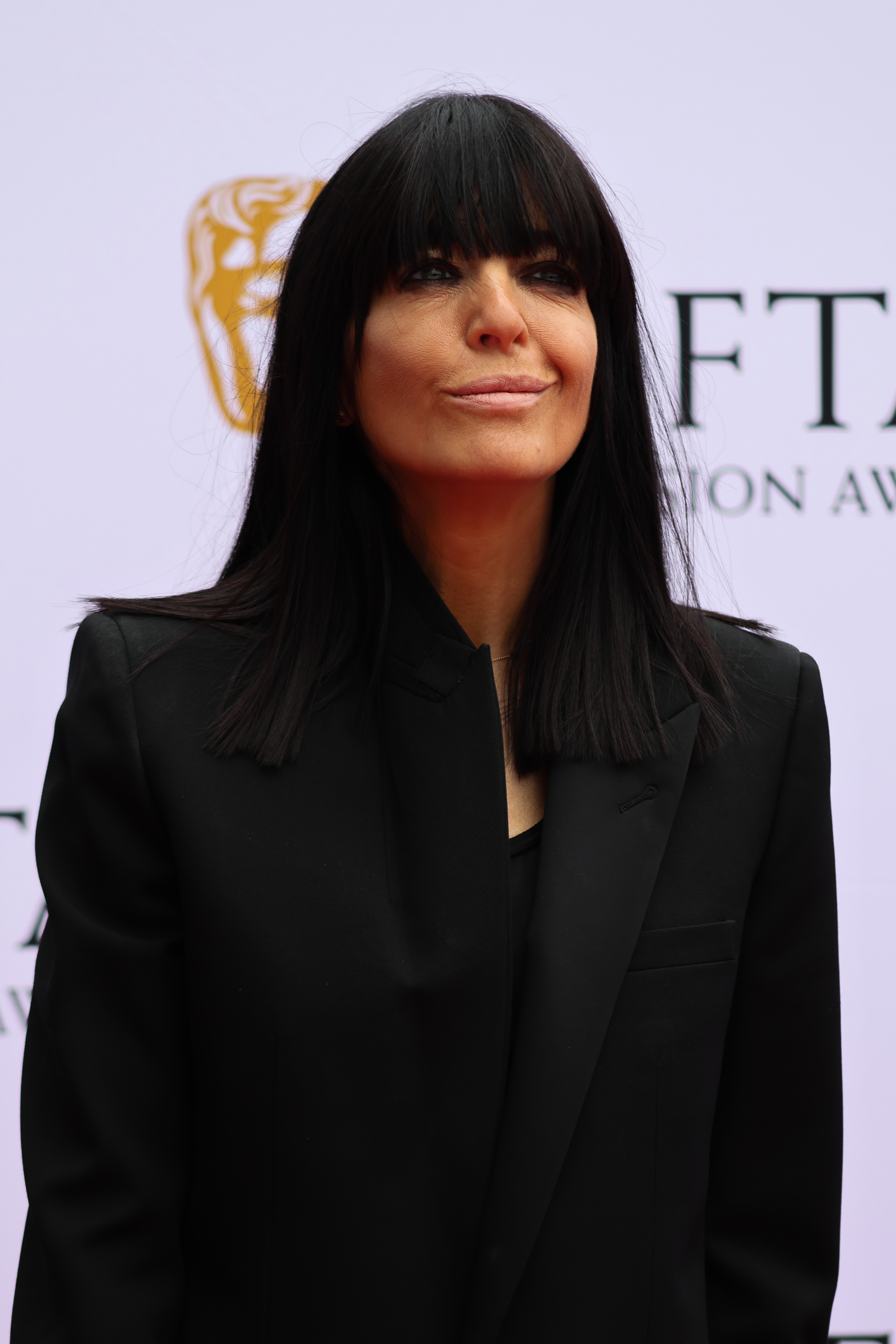
Claudia Winkleman

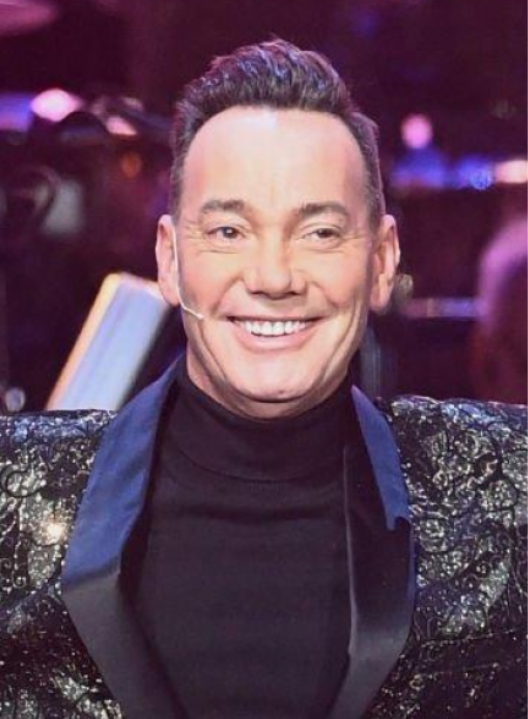
Craig Revel Horwood

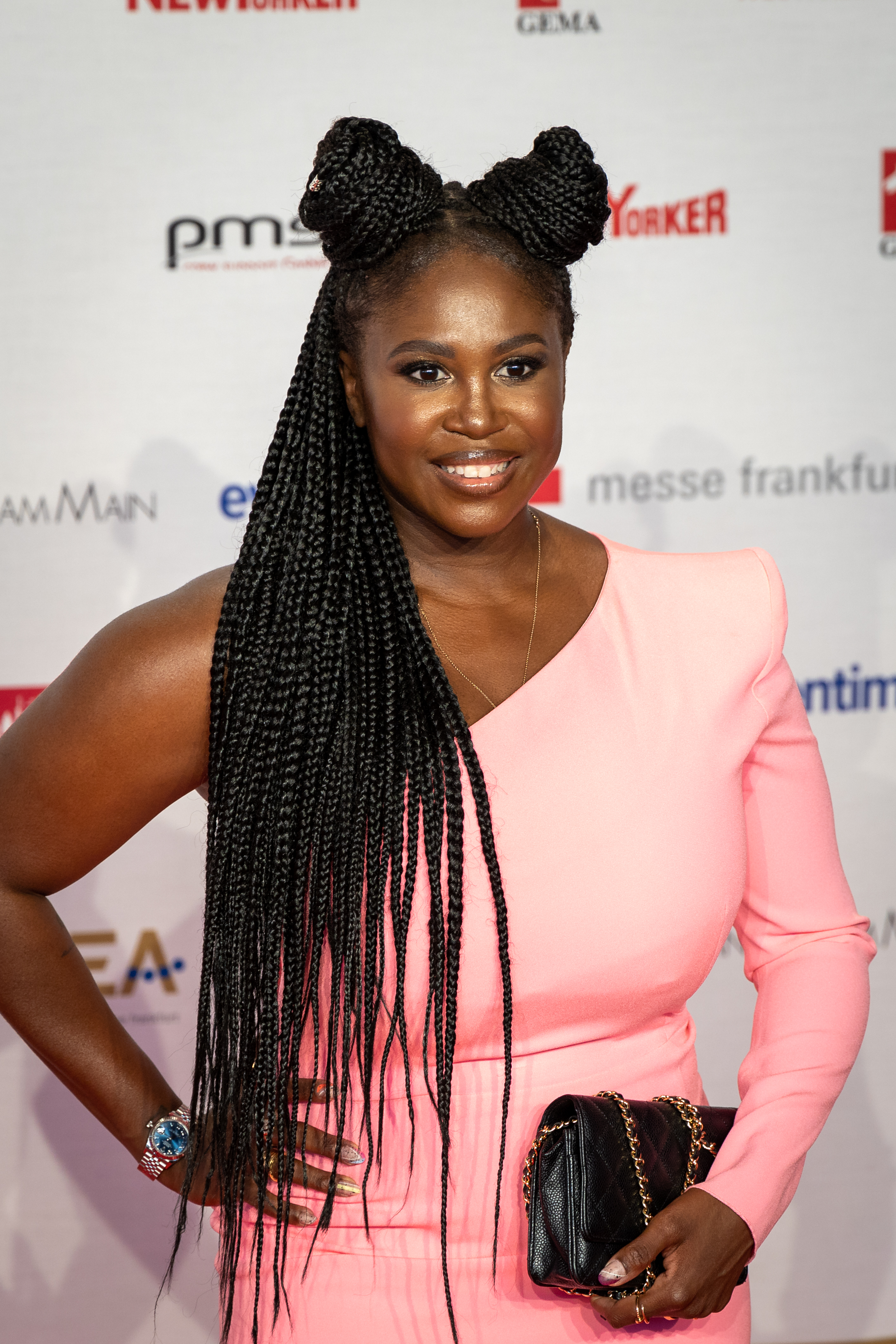
Motsi Mabuse

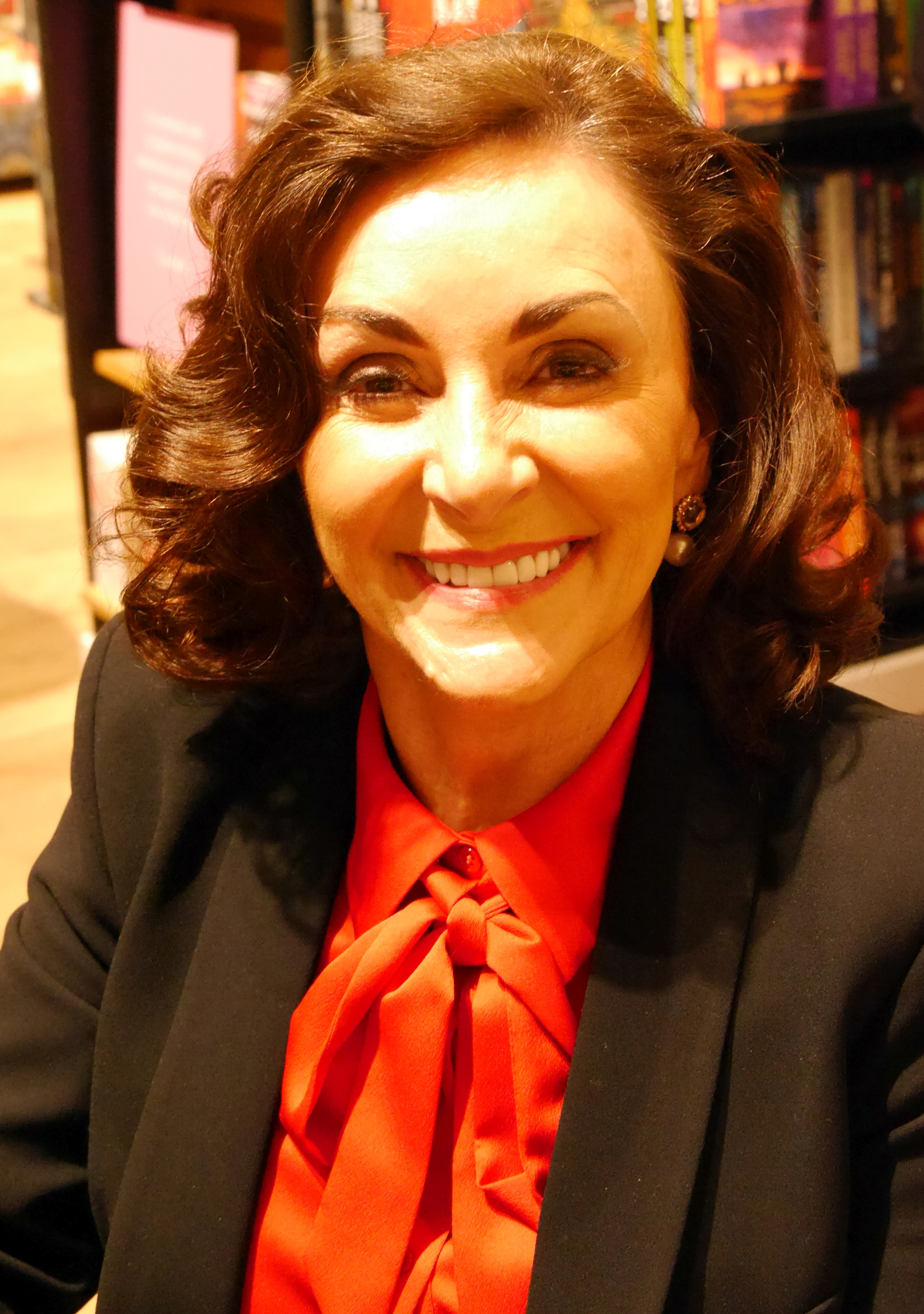
Shirley Ballas

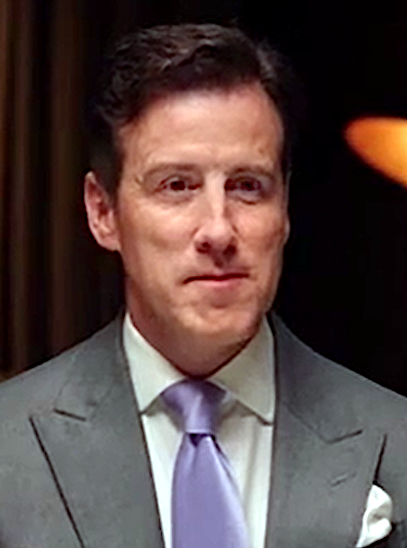
Anton Du Beke

The couples dance each week in a live show. The judges score each performance out of ten. After all the couples have danced they are then ranked according to the judges' scores and given points according to their rank, with the highest ranked couple receiving a number of points equal to the number of couples dancing that week e.g. 7 points where there are seven couples dancing. When there are no tied scores the lowest scored couple will receive one point. However in the event of a tie where two or more couples obtain the same judges score, the couple below those in the tie will be awarded one point below the points awarded to each of the tied couples. So, for example, if two couples obtain the same rank and obtain 7 points each, the couple immediately below them will be awarded 6 points. When couples are ranked equally by the judges the scoring of all other couples underneath will follow in the same descending order. Should there be any tied scores the lowest scored couple will therefore receive more than one point from the judges scores. The public are also invited to vote for their favourite couples, and the couples are ranked again according to the number of votes they receive, again receiving points; The couple with the most votes receiving the most points. Again in the unlikely event of a tie in the public vote the points are awarded in the same way as the points from the judges score.

The points for judges' score and public vote are then added together, and the two couples with the fewest points are placed in the bottom two. If two couples have equal points, the points from the public vote are given precedence.

As with the previous series, the bottom two couples have to perform a dance-off on the results show. Based on that performance alone, each judge then votes on which couple should stay and which couple should leave, with Shirley Ballas, as head judge, having the last and deciding vote, if needed.

== Professional dancers ==
In June 2024, the BBC announced that Dianne Buswell, Nadiya Bychkova, Vito Coppola, Graziano Di Prima, Amy Dowden, Carlos Gu, Karen Hauer, Katya Jones, Neil Jones, Nikita Kuzmin, Gorka Márquez, Luba Mushtuk, Lauren Oakley, Jowita Przystał, Johannes Radebe, Michelle Tsiakkas, Kai Widdrington and Nancy Xu would be returning to the series. It was confirmed that Giovanni Pernice would not be returning to the show, following misconduct allegations regarding his dance teaching methods. Pernice, however, denied "any suggestion of abusive or threatening behaviour".

In July 2024, it was announced that Aljaž Škorjanec would be returning as a professional after a two-year hiatus, following his departure in March 2022, having last appeared in the nineteenth series. Later that same month, despite initially being confirmed to return for the series, it was subsequently announced that Graziano Di Prima would not be returning to the show, following allegations of misconduct against him towards Zara McDermott, his partner from the previous series. In a statement, Di Prima said that he "deeply regretted" the events that led to his departure from the show.

During the launch show, Michelle Tsiakkas received a celebrity partner for the first time, while Carlos Gu, Lauren Oakley and Kai Widdrington did not receive a partner. The rest of the pros were paired to a celebrity, including Neil Jones, who did not have a celebrity partner for the last two series.

On 4 November 2024, it was announced that due to a foot injury, Amy Dowden would no longer compete in the series. Oakley took over from Dowden as JB Gill's professional partner.

== Couples ==
On 1 August 2024, prior to the official BBC announcements, Tom Dean confirmed himself as the first participant in the series, during an interview at the 2024 Summer Olympics after competing in the 4 × 200 metre freestyle relay. The official announcements began on 5 August, with Chris McCausland and JB Gill announced, the former becoming the first blind contestant to appear on the show. Celebrity contestants continued to be revealed until 12 August 2024, when the full line-up was announced.

Celebrity	Notability	Professional partner	Status
Tom Dean	Olympic swimmer	Nadiya Bychkova	Eliminated 1st on 29 September 2024
Toyah Willcox	Singer, actress & television presenter	Neil Jones	Eliminated 2nd on 6 October 2024
Nick Knowles	Television presenter	Luba Mushtuk	Eliminated 3rd on 13 October 2024
Paul Merson	England footballer & pundit	Karen Hauer	Eliminated 4th on 20 October 2024
Dr. Punam Krishan	Morning Live doctor & author	Gorka Márquez	Eliminated 5th on 27 October 2024
Sam Quek	Olympic field hockey player & television presenter	Nikita Kuzmin	Eliminated 6th on 3 November 2024
Shayne Ward	Singer & actor	Nancy Xu	Eliminated 7th on 10 November 2024
Wynne Evans	Opera singer & BBC Radio Wales presenter	Katya Jones	Eliminated 8th on 17 November 2024
Jamie Borthwick	EastEnders actor	Michelle Tsiakkas	Eliminated 9th on 24 November 2024
Montell Douglas	Olympic sprinter, bobsledder & Gladiators star	Johannes Radebe	Eliminated 10th on 1 December 2024
Pete Wicks	Television personality	Jowita Przystał	Eliminated 11th on 8 December 2024
JB Gill	JLS singer & television presenter	Amy Dowden (Weeks 1–6); Lauren Oakley (Weeks 7–13)	Runners-up on 14 December 2024
Sarah Hadland	Stage & screen actress	Vito Coppola	Runners-up on 14 December 2024
Tasha Ghouri	Love Island finalist & model	Aljaž Škorjanec	Runners-up on 14 December 2024
Chris McCausland	Stand-up comedian & actor	Dianne Buswell	Winners on 14 December 2024

== Scoring chart ==
The highest score each week is indicated in bold green with a dagger (†), while the lowest score each week is indicated in italicized red with a double-dagger (‡).

Color key:

Winners
Co-runners-up
Bottom two
Excused from competition for the week
Eliminated

Strictly Come Dancing series 22 – Weekly scores
Couple	Pl.	Week													
Couple	Pl.	1	2	1+2	3	4	5	6	7	8	9	10	11	12	13
Chris & Dianne	1st	23	29	52	30	30	35	26‡	29	33	37	33+1=34	32	33+36=69	38+38+40=116‡
JB & Amy/Lauren	2nd	**31**†	27	58	32	30	30 (Note: This couple was in the bottom two, but was not eliminated.)	32	**39**†	**37**†	35	39+7=**46**†	**39**†	39+40=**79**†	40+39+40=**119**†
Sarah & Vito	2nd	30	32	62	33	27	32	**38**†	37	33	**39**†	36+4=40	38	36+36=72	39+39+40=118
Tasha & Aljaž	2nd	30	**35**†	**65**†	**34**†	**39**†	34	37	**39**†	**37**†	**39**†	40+6=**46**†	38	35+40=75	39+40+40=**119**†
Pete & Jowita	5th	17	22	39	26	29	22	31	22‡	36	27‡	29+3=32‡	26‡	32+33=65‡ (Note: This couple was eliminated.)	
Montell & Johannes	6th	26	30	56	28	33	**39**†	35	35	36	35	37+5=42	32		
Jamie & Michelle	7th	23	27	50	30	34	**39**†	**38**†	31	30‡	33	32+2=34			
Wynne & Katya	8th	26	30	56	30	34	33	31	30	32	31				
Shayne & Nancy	9th	21	31	52	33	30	31	31	35	30‡					
Sam & Nikita	10th	23	22	45	30	28	26	31	29						
Dr. Punam & Gorka	11th	19	18	37	33	20‡	21	26‡							
Paul & Karen	12th	17	15‡	32	19	23	19‡								
Nick & Luba	13th	18	21	39	(Note: This couple was excused from competition due to illness or injury, and was granted a bye to the following week.)	21									
Toyah & Neil	14th	12‡	18	30‡	15‡										
Tom & Nadiya	15th	23	20	43											

=== Average chart ===
Additional points received for the Samba-thon in Week 10 are not included in this chart.

Couple	Rank by average	Total points	Number of dances	Total average
Tasha & Aljaž	1st	596	16	37.3
JB & Amy/Lauren	2nd	569	16	35.6
Sarah & Vito	3rd	565	16	35.3
Montell & Johannes	4th	366	11	33.3
Chris & Dianne	5th	522	16	32.6
Jamie & Michelle	6th	317	10	31.7
Wynne & Katya	7th	277	9	30.8
Shayne & Nancy	8th	242	8	30.3
Pete & Jowita	9th	352	13	27.1
Sam & Nikita	10th	189	7	27.0
Dr. Punam & Gorka	11th	137	6	22.8
Tom & Nadiya	12th	43	2	21.5
Nick & Luba	13th	60	3	20.0
Paul & Karen	14th	93	5	18.6
Toyah & Neil	15th	45	3	15.0

== Weekly scores ==
Unless indicated otherwise, individual judges scores in the charts below (given in parentheses) are listed in this order from left to right: Craig Revel Horwood, Motsi Mabuse, Shirley Ballas, Anton Du Beke.

=== Launch show ===
- Musical guests: Clean Bandit & Anne-Marie — "Cry Baby"

=== Week 1 ===
There was no elimination this week; all scores carried over to the following week. Couples are listed in the order they performed.

Couple	Scores	Dance	Music
Nick & Luba	18 (3, 5, 5, 5)	Jive	"We Built This City" — Starship
Sam & Nikita	23 (6, 6, 6, 5)	Foxtrot	"Where Did Our Love Go" — The Supremes
Shayne & Nancy	21 (4, 6, 5, 6)	Samba	"Do I Do" — Stevie Wonder
Toyah & Neil	12 (2, 4, 2, 4)	Tango	"Ray of Light" — Madonna
Tasha & Aljaž	30 (8, 8, 7, 7)	Cha-cha-cha	"Espresso" — Sabrina Carpenter
JB & Amy	31 (7, 8, 8, 8)	Waltz	"When I Need You" — Leo Sayer
Pete & Jowita	17 (4, 5, 3, 5)	Paso doble	"Breathe" — The Prodigy
Sarah & Vito	30 (8, 8, 7, 7)	Quickstep	"9 to 5" — Dolly Parton
Tom & Nadiya	23 (5, 6, 6, 6)	Tango	"Golden" — Harry Styles
Dr. Punam & Gorka	19 (4, 5, 5, 5)	Cha-cha-cha	"Love at First Sight" — Kylie Minogue
Paul & Karen	17 (2, 4, 5, 6)	American Smooth	"Vindaloo" — Fat Les
Jamie & Michelle	23 (6, 6, 5, 6)	Viennese waltz	"Beautiful Things" — Benson Boone
Chris & Dianne	23 (4, 6, 6, 7)	Cha-cha-cha	"Twist and Shout" — The Beatles
Montell & Johannes	26 (6, 7, 6, 7)	Foxtrot	"Is You Is or Is You Ain't My Baby" — Dinah Washington
Wynne & Katya	26 (6, 6, 7, 7)	Samba	"Help Yourself" — Tom Jones

=== Week 2 ===
- Musical guests: Ezra Collective & Yazmin Lacey — "God Gave Me Feet for Dancing"

Couples are listed in the order they performed.

Couple	Scores	Dance	Music	Result
Tom & Nadiya	20 (3, 6, 5, 6)	Cha-cha-cha	"Boogie Wonderland" — Earth, Wind & Fire	Eliminated
Dr. Punam & Gorka	18 (4, 5, 4, 5)	Foxtrot	"Man! I Feel Like a Woman!" — Shania Twain	Safe
Paul & Karen	15 (2, 4, 4, 5)	Salsa	"Fireball" — Pitbull feat. John Ryan	Safe
Wynne & Katya	30 (7, 7, 8, 8)	Viennese waltz	"The Blue Danube" — Johann Strauss II	Safe
JB & Amy	27 (7, 7, 6, 7)	Cha-cha-cha	"Closer" — Ne-Yo	Safe
Sam & Nikita	22 (4, 6, 6, 6)	Charleston	"The Charleston" — Bob Wilson & His Varsity Rhythm Boys	Safe
Chris & Dianne	29 (6, 7, 8, 8)	Foxtrot	"Be Young, Be Foolish, Be Happy" — The Tams	Safe
Jamie & Michelle	27 (6, 7, 7, 7)	Rumba	"Ain't No Sunshine" — Bill Withers	Safe
Toyah & Neil	18 (3, 5, 5, 5)	Jive	"Nutbush City Limits" — Ike & Tina Turner	Bottom two
Nick & Luba	21 (5, 5, 5, 6)	American Smooth	"Parklife" — Blur	Safe
Montell & Johannes	30 (8, 7, 7, 8)	Samba	"Fuego" — Eleni Foureira	Safe
Tasha & Aljaž	35 (8, 9, 9, 9)	Viennese waltz	"Misty Blue" — Dorothy Moore	Safe
Shayne & Nancy	31 (7, 8, 8, 8)	Tango	"The Door" — Teddy Swims	Safe
Pete & Jowita	22 (4, 6, 6, 6)	American Smooth	"I Had Some Help" — Post Malone & Morgan Wallen	Safe
Sarah & Vito	32 (8, 8, 8, 8)	Paso doble	"Freed from Desire" — Gala	Safe

Judges' votes to save

- Horwood: Toyah & Neil
- Mabuse: Toyah & Neil
- Du Beke: Tom & Nadiya
- Ballas: Toyah & Neil

=== Week 3: Movie Week ===
- Musical guests: Alexis Ffrench — "The Heart Asks Pleasure First" (from The Piano)

Couples are listed in the order they performed.

Nick and Luba announced that they would be unable to perform on the live show after Nick sustained a knee injury. Under the rules of the show, they were granted a bye to the following week.

Couple	Scores	Dance	Music	Film	Result
Montell & Johannes	28 (7, 7, 7, 7)	Tango	"One Night Only"	Dreamgirls	Safe
Toyah & Neil	15 (3, 4, 4, 4)	Samba	"Poor Unfortunate Souls"	The Little Mermaid	Eliminated
Chris & Dianne	30 (7, 7, 8, 8)	Jive	"Wayne's World Theme"	Wayne's World	Safe
Tasha & Aljaž	34 (8, 8, 9, 9)	Rumba	"What Was I Made For?"	Barbie	Safe
Paul & Karen	19 (3, 5, 5, 6)	Cha-cha-cha	"The Magnificent Seven"	The Magnificent Seven	Bottom two
Sarah & Vito	33 (8, 9, 8, 8)	Viennese waltz	"Hedwig's Theme"	Harry Potter	Safe
Pete & Jowita	26 (6, 6, 7, 7)	Samba	"George of the Jungle"	George of the Jungle	Safe
JB & Amy	32 (7, 8, 8, 9)	American Smooth	"Pure Imagination"	Wonka	Safe
Sam & Nikita	30 (7, 8, 7, 8)	Paso doble	"Elevation (Tomb Raider Mix)"	Lara Croft: Tomb Raider	Safe
Shayne & Nancy	33 (8, 9, 8, 8)	Viennese waltz	"If I Can Dream"	Elvis	Safe
Wynne & Katya	30 (7, 7, 8, 8)	Cha-cha-cha	"Papa's Got a Brand New Bag"	Mrs. Doubtfire	Safe
Dr. Punam & Gorka	33 (8, 9, 8, 8)	Couple's choice	"Bole Chudiyan"	Kabhi Khushi Kabhie Gham	Safe
Jamie & Michelle	30 (8, 8, 7, 7)	Quickstep	"I'm Still Standing"	Rocketman	Safe

Judges' votes to save

- Horwood: Paul & Karen
- Mabuse: Paul & Karen
- Du Beke: Paul & Karen
- Ballas: Did not vote, but would have voted to save Paul & Karen

=== Week 4 ===
- Musical guests: Snow Patrol — "Everything's Here and Nothing's Lost"

Couples are listed in the order they performed.

Couple	Scores	Dance	Music	Result
Shayne & Nancy	30 (7, 8, 7, 8)	Cha-cha-cha	"Ain't No Love (Ain't No Use)" — Sub Sub, feat. Melanie Williams	Bottom two
Sarah & Vito	27 (6, 7, 7, 7)	Foxtrot	"Birds of a Feather" — Billie Eilish	Safe
Nick & Luba	21 (4, 6, 5, 6)	Charleston	"Rain on the Roof" — from Paddington 2	Eliminated
Jamie & Michelle	34 (8, 9, 9, 8)	Salsa	"Danza Kuduro" — Don Omar & Lucenzo	Safe
Wynne & Katya	34 (8, 9, 9, 8)	Tango	"Money, Money, Money" — ABBA	Safe
Dr. Punam & Gorka	20 (4, 5, 5, 6)	Jive	"2 Be Loved (Am I Ready)" — Lizzo	Safe
Paul & Karen	23 (4, 6, 6, 7)	Quickstep	"I Won't Dance" — Fred Astaire	Safe
JB & Amy	30 (7, 8, 7, 8)	Rumba	"You Might Need Somebody" — Kara Marni	Safe
Chris & Dianne	30 (6, 8, 8, 8)	Salsa	"Down Under" — Men at Work	Safe
Montell & Johannes	33 (8, 8, 8, 9)	Viennese waltz	"Nobody Gets Me" — SZA	Safe
Sam & Nikita	28 (7, 7, 7, 7)	Samba	"Hips Don't Lie" — Shakira feat. Wyclef Jean	Safe
Pete & Jowita	29 (7, 7, 8, 7)	Quickstep	"Town Called Malice" — The Jam	Safe
Tasha & Aljaž	39 (9, 10, 10, 10)	Charleston	"Unhealthy" — Anne-Marie, feat. Shania Twain	Safe

Judges' votes to save

- Horwood: Shayne & Nancy
- Mabuse: Shayne & Nancy
- Du Beke: Shayne & Nancy
- Ballas: Did not vote, but would have voted to save Shayne & Nancy

=== Week 5 ===
- Musical guests: Sophie Ellis-Bextor — "Freedom of the Night"

Couples are listed in the order they performed.

Couple	Scores	Dance	Music	Result
JB & Amy	30 (7, 8, 7, 8)	Jive	"Hey Ya!" — Outkast	Bottom two
Dr. Punam & Gorka	21 (4, 6, 5, 6)	Viennese waltz	"She's Always a Woman" — Billy Joel	Safe
Jamie & Michelle	39 (9, 10, 10, 10)	Paso doble	"Malagueña" – Ernesto Lecuona	Safe
Chris & Dianne	35 (8, 9, 9, 9)	Waltz	"You'll Never Walk Alone" — Gerry and the Pacemakers	Safe
Tasha & Aljaž	34 (8, 9, 8, 9)	Tango	"Dog Days Are Over" — Florence and the Machine	Safe
Paul & Karen	19 (3, 5, 5, 6)	Samba	"Car Wash" — Rose Royce	Eliminated
Sam & Nikita	26 (6, 7, 6, 7)	Quickstep	"Unwritten" — Natasha Bedingfield	Safe
Pete & Jowita	22 (4, 5, 6, 7)	Rumba	"Don't Look Back in Anger" — Oasis	Safe
Sarah & Vito	32 (8, 8, 8, 8)	Samba	"Do It, Do It Again" — Raffaella Carrà	Safe
Shayne & Nancy	31 (7, 8, 8, 8)	American Smooth	"Get Here" — Sam Smith	Safe
Wynne & Katya	33 (7, 9, 9, 8)	Quickstep	"Mr. Blue Sky" — Electric Light Orchestra	Safe
Montell & Johannes	39 (9, 10, 10, 10)	Couple's choice	"Skeleton Move" — Master KG & Zanda Zakuza	Safe

Judges' votes to save

- Horwood: JB & Amy
- Mabuse: JB & Amy
- Du Beke: JB & Amy
- Ballas: Did not vote, but would have voted to save JB & Amy

=== Week 6: Halloween Week ===
- Musical guests: Lady Blackbird — "Reborn"

Amy Dowden didn't appear in the results show due to her collapsing backstage following the main show, so JB appeared alone. She was transported to Barnet Hospital as a precautionary measure, but was later reported to be feeling better.

Couples are listed in the order they performed.

Couple	Scores	Dance	Music	Result
Chris & Dianne	26 (5, 7, 7, 7)	Samba	"Stayin' Alive" — Bee Gees	Safe
Pete & Jowita	31 (7, 8, 8, 8)	Viennese waltz	"That's Life" — Frank Sinatra	Safe
Montell & Johannes	35 (9, 9, 9, 8)	Cha-cha-cha	"Love Potion No. 9" — The Clovers	Safe
Dr. Punam & Gorka	26 (6, 7, 6, 7)	Tango	"Sweet Dreams" — Eurythmics	Eliminated
Wynne & Katya	31 (7, 8, 8, 8)	Salsa	"Canned Heat" — Jamiroquai	Safe
JB & Amy	32 (7, 9, 8, 8)	Foxtrot	"Dancing in the Moonlight" — Toploader	Safe
Tasha & Aljaž	37 (9, 9, 9, 10)	Samba	"I Like to Move It" — Reel 2 Real	Safe
Shayne & Nancy	31 (8, 8, 7, 8)	Paso doble	"In the Hall of the Mountain King" — Edvard Grieg	Bottom two
Jamie & Michelle	38 (9, 10, 10, 9)	American Smooth	"The Addams Family Theme" — Vic Mizzy	Safe
Sarah & Vito	38 (9, 10, 9, 10)	Argentine tango	"Ready or Not" — Fugees	Safe
Sam & Nikita	31 (7, 8, 8, 8)	Jive	"Time Warp" — The Rocky Horror Picture Show	Safe

Judges' votes to save

- Horwood: Shayne & Nancy
- Mabuse: Shayne & Nancy
- Du Beke: Shayne & Nancy
- Ballas: Did not vote, but would have voted to save Shayne & Nancy

=== Week 7: Icons Week ===
- Musical guests: Dear Alice — "Best Day of Our Lives"

Each couple danced to a song by a popular musical icon, with the celebrity appearing in the guise of their icon. Due to an illness, Amy Dowden was unable to perform. Lauren Oakley therefore danced with JB Gill instead.

Couples are listed in the order they performed.

Couple	Scores	Dance	Music	Icon	Result
Pete & Jowita	22 (4, 6, 6, 6)	Salsa	"Another One Bites the Dust" — Queen	Freddie Mercury	Safe
Wynne & Katya	30 (7, 7, 8, 8)	Rumba	"This Is My Life"	Shirley Bassey	Safe
Sam & Nikita	29 (6, 8, 7, 8)	American Smooth	"Love Story"	Taylor Swift	Eliminated
Chris & Dianne	29 (6, 7, 8, 8)	Tango	"Rock and Roll All Nite" — Kiss	Gene Simmons	Safe
Sarah & Vito	37 (9, 9, 9, 10)	Cha-cha-cha	"Like a Prayer"	Madonna	Safe
JB & Lauren	39 (9, 10, 10, 10)	Couple's choice	"Uptown Funk", "Treasure" & "24K Magic"	Bruno Mars	Safe
Montell & Johannes	35 (8, 9, 9, 9)	Waltz	"I Will Always Love You"	Whitney Houston	Bottom two
Jamie & Michelle	31 (7, 8, 8, 8)	Samba	"Faith"	George Michael	Safe
Tasha & Aljaž	39 (9, 10, 10, 10)	Couple's choice	"What About Us"	Pink	Safe
Shayne & Nancy	35 (8, 9, 9, 9)	Quickstep	"Help!" & "Hey Jude" — The Beatles	John Lennon	Safe

Judges' votes to save

- Horwood: Montell & Johannes
- Mabuse: Montell & Johannes
- Du Beke: Montell & Johannes
- Ballas: Did not vote, but would have voted to save Montell & Johannes

=== Week 8 ===
- Musical guests: Michael Ball & Alfie Boe — "He Ain't Heavy, He's My Brother"

After being unable to perform last week, Amy Dowden was confirmed to withdraw due to injury. Lauren Oakley continued to dance with JB Gill for the remainder of the series.

Couples are listed in the order they performed.

Couple	Scores	Dance	Music	Result
Tasha & Aljaž	37 (8, 10, 10, 9)	Quickstep	"Fantasy" — Mariah Carey	Safe
Shayne & Nancy	30 (7, 8, 7, 8)	Rumba	"Time After Time" — Cyndi Lauper	Eliminated
Sarah & Vito	33 (8, 8, 8, 9)	American Smooth	"Proud" — Heather Small	Safe
Pete & Jowita	36 (8, 9, 10, 9)	Couple's choice	"The Best" — Nicotine Dolls	Safe
JB & Lauren	37 (9, 9, 9, 10)	Samba	"Mas que Nada" — Sérgio Mendes	Safe
Jamie & Michelle	30 (7, 8, 7, 8)	Argentine tango	"Do I Wanna Know?" — Arctic Monkeys	Safe
Wynne & Katya	32 (7, 8, 8, 9)	American Smooth	"Grace Kelly" — Mika	Bottom two
Montell & Johannes	36 (9, 9, 9, 9)	Paso doble	"Lola's Theme" — The Shapeshifters	Safe
Chris & Dianne	33 (7, 8, 9, 9)	Couple's choice	"Instant Karma! (We All Shine On)" — John Lennon	Safe

Judges' votes to save

- Horwood: Shayne & Nancy
- Mabuse: Shayne & Nancy
- Du Beke: Wynne & Katya
- Ballas: Wynne & Katya

=== Week 9: Blackpool Week ===
- Musical guest: Pet Shop Boys — Medley of their hits and "All the Young Dudes"

This week's episode was staged in the Tower Ballroom at the Blackpool Tower in Blackpool, Lancashire. Couples are listed in the order they performed.

Couple	Scores	Dance	Music	Result
Chris & Dianne	37 (8, 9, 10, 10)	American Smooth	"Jump" — Paul Anka	Safe
Montell & Johannes	35 (8, 9, 9, 9)	Salsa	"Don't Leave Me This Way" — Thelma Houston	Bottom two
Sarah & Vito	39 (9, 10, 10, 10)	Couple's choice	"Padam Padam" & "Can't Get You Out of My Head" — Kylie Minogue	Safe
Wynne & Katya	31 (7, 8, 8, 8)	Charleston	"Les toréadors" — Georges Bizet	Eliminated
Pete & Jowita	27 (4, 7, 8, 8)	Cha-cha-cha	"I'm Too Sexy" — Right Said Fred	Safe
JB & Lauren	35 (8, 9, 9, 9)	Quickstep	"Never Gonna Give You Up" — Rick Astley	Safe
Tasha & Aljaž	39 (9, 10, 10, 10)	Paso doble	"Torn" — Nathan Lanier	Safe
Jamie & Michelle	33 (8, 8, 8, 9)	Jive	"The Ketchup Song (Aserejé)" — Las Ketchup	Safe

Judges' votes to save

- Horwood: Montell & Johannes
- Mabuse: Montell & Johannes
- Du Beke: Montell & Johannes
- Ballas: Did not vote, but would have voted to save Montell & Johannes

=== Week 10 ===
Musical guest: Sugababes — "Overload", "Freak like Me" & "Push the Button"

Each couple performed one routine and then all couples participated in a samba marathon for additional points, during which they were asked by Horwood to leave the floor once eliminated. The winners were announced separately from the floor. Couples are listed in the order they performed.

Couple	Scores	Dance	Music	Result
Pete & Jowita	29 (6, 7, 8, 8)	Tango	"Easy Lover" — Philip Bailey & Phil Collins	Safe
Sarah & Vito	36 (8, 8, 10, 10)	Rumba	"Chains" — Tina Arena	Safe
JB & Lauren	39 (9, 10, 10, 10)	Charleston	"Yes Sir, That's My Baby" — Firehouse Five Plus Two	Safe
Jamie & Michelle	32 (8, 8, 7, 9)	Foxtrot	"Stand by Me" — Ben E. King	Eliminated
Chris & Dianne	33 (7, 8, 9, 9)	Paso doble	"El gato montés" — Manuel Penella	Safe
Montell & Johannes	37 (8, 10, 9, 10)	Quickstep	"Get Happy" — Ella Fitzgerald	Bottom two
Tasha & Aljaž	40 (10, 10, 10, 10)	American Smooth	"Someone You Loved" — Lewis Capaldi	Safe
Chris & Dianne	1	Samba-thon (Samba Marathon)	"Samba" — Gloria Estefan & "La Vida Es Un Carnaval" — Celia Cruz	
Jamie & Michelle	2	Samba-thon (Samba Marathon)	"Samba" — Gloria Estefan & "La Vida Es Un Carnaval" — Celia Cruz	
Pete & Jowita	3	Samba-thon (Samba Marathon)	"Samba" — Gloria Estefan & "La Vida Es Un Carnaval" — Celia Cruz	
Sarah & Vito	4	Samba-thon (Samba Marathon)	"Samba" — Gloria Estefan & "La Vida Es Un Carnaval" — Celia Cruz	
Montell & Johannes	5	Samba-thon (Samba Marathon)	"Samba" — Gloria Estefan & "La Vida Es Un Carnaval" — Celia Cruz	
Tasha & Aljaž	6	Samba-thon (Samba Marathon)	"Samba" — Gloria Estefan & "La Vida Es Un Carnaval" — Celia Cruz	
JB & Lauren	7	Samba-thon (Samba Marathon)	"Samba" — Gloria Estefan & "La Vida Es Un Carnaval" — Celia Cruz	

Judges' votes to save

- Horwood: Montell & Johannes
- Mabuse: Montell & Johannes
- Du Beke: Montell & Johannes
- Ballas: Did not vote, but would have voted to save Montell & Johannes

=== Week 11: Musicals Week (Quarter-final) ===
Musical guests: Hamilton — "The Schuyler Sisters"

Couples are listed in the order they performed.

Couple	Scores	Dance	Music	Musical	Result
Sarah & Vito	38 (9, 9, 10, 10)	Charleston	"Popular"	Wicked	Safe
Montell & Johannes	32 (7, 8, 8, 9)	Rumba	"I'm Here"	The Color Purple	Eliminated
Tasha & Aljaž	38 (9, 10, 9, 10)	Argentine tango	"Ex-Wives"	Six	Bottom two
Chris & Dianne	32 (7, 8, 8, 9)	Quickstep	"You're the Top"	Anything Goes	Safe
Pete & Jowita	26 (5, 7, 7, 7)	Waltz	"Somewhere"	West Side Story	Safe
JB & Lauren	39 (9, 10, 10, 10)	Viennese waltz	"Let's Go Fly a Kite"	Mary Poppins	Safe

Judges’ votes to save

- Horwood: Tasha & Aljaž
- Mabuse: Tasha & Aljaž
- Du Beke: Tasha & Aljaž
- Ballas: Did not vote, but would have voted to save Tasha & Aljaž

=== Week 12: Semi-final ===
Musical guests:

- Becky Hill — "Indestructible"
- Raye — "Genesis Pt III."

Couples are listed in the order they performed.

Couple	Scores	Dance	Music	Result
Tasha & Aljaž	35 (8, 9, 9, 9)	Salsa	"Something New" — Girls Aloud	Bottom two
Tasha & Aljaž	40 (10, 10, 10, 10)	Waltz	"(You Make Me Feel Like) A Natural Woman" — Aretha Franklin	Bottom two
JB & Lauren	39 (9, 10, 10, 10)	Paso doble	"Requiem for a Tower" — Clint Mansell	Safe
JB & Lauren	40 (10, 10, 10, 10)	Salsa	"Red Alert" — Basement Jaxx	Safe
Chris & Dianne	33 (7, 8, 9, 9)	Charleston	"When You're Smiling" — The Blue Vipers of Brooklyn	Safe
Chris & Dianne	36 (9, 9, 9, 9)	Viennese waltz	"Nothing Else Matters" — Metallica	Safe
Sarah & Vito	36 (9, 9, 9, 9)	Tango	"Big Love" — Fleetwood Mac	Safe
Sarah & Vito	36 (9, 9, 9, 9)	Jive	"I'm So Excited" — The Pointer Sisters	Safe
Pete & Jowita	32 (7, 8, 9, 8)	Foxtrot	"Beyond the Sea" — Bobby Darin	Eliminated
Pete & Jowita	33 (7, 8, 9, 9)	Argentine tango	"Bitter Sweet Symphony" — The Verve	Eliminated

Judges' votes to save

- Horwood: Tasha & Aljaž
- Mabuse: Tasha & Aljaž
- Du Beke: Tasha & Aljaž
- Ballas: Did not vote, but would have voted to save Tasha & Aljaž

=== Week 13: Final ===
Musical guest: Raye — "Oscar Winning Tears"

Each couple performed three routines: one chosen by the judges, their showdance routine, and their favourite dance of the series. Couples are listed in the order they performed.

Couple	Scores	Dance	Music	Result
JB & Lauren	40 (10, 10, 10, 10)	Viennese waltz	"Let's Go Fly a Kite" — Sherman Brothers	Runners-up
JB & Lauren	39 (9, 10, 10, 10)	Showdance	"Uptight (Everything's Alright)" — Stevie Wonder, "Dancing In the Street" — Martha & The Vandellas & "Ain't No Mountain High Enough" — Diana Ross	Runners-up
JB & Lauren	40 (10, 10, 10, 10)	Samba	"Mas que nada" — Sérgio Mendes	Runners-up
Tasha & Aljaž	39 (9, 10, 10, 10)	Couple's choice	"What About Us" — Pink	Runners-up
Tasha & Aljaž	40 (10, 10, 10, 10)	Showdance	"Sing, Sing, Sing (With a Swing)" — Benny Goodman	Runners-up
Tasha & Aljaž	40 (10, 10, 10, 10)	American Smooth	"Someone You Loved" — Lewis Capaldi	Runners-up
Chris & Dianne	38 (8, 10, 10, 10)	Couple's choice	"Instant Karma! (We All Shine On)" — John Lennon	Winners
Chris & Dianne	38 (8, 10, 10, 10)	Showdance	"You Get What You Give" — New Radicals	Winners
Chris & Dianne	40 (10, 10, 10, 10)	Waltz	"You'll Never Walk Alone" — Gerry and the Pacemakers	Winners
Sarah & Vito	39 (9, 10, 10, 10)	American Smooth	"Proud" — Heather Small	Runners-up
Sarah & Vito	39 (9, 10, 10, 10)	Showdance	"Cabaret" — Metropole Orkest	Runners-up
Sarah & Vito	40 (10, 10, 10, 10)	Cha-cha-cha	"Like a Prayer" — Madonna	Runners-up

== Dance chart ==
- Weeks 1–9 and 11: One unlearned dance
- Week 10: One unlearned dance and Samba-thon
- Week 12: Two unlearned dances
- Week 13 (Finals): Judges' choice, showdance & favourite dance of the series

Strictly Come Dancing (series 22) – Dance chart
Couple	Week																
Couple	1	2	3	4	5	6	7	8	9	10		11	12		13		
Chris & Dianne	Cha-cha-cha	Foxtrot	Jive	Salsa	Waltz	Samba	Tango	Couple's choice	American Smooth	Paso doble	Samba-thon	Quickstep	Charleston	Viennese waltz	Couple's choice	Showdance	Waltz
JB & Amy/Lauren	Waltz	Cha-cha-cha	American Smooth	Rumba	Jive	Foxtrot	Couple's choice	Samba	Quickstep	Charleston	Samba-thon	Viennese waltz	Paso doble	Salsa	Viennese waltz	Showdance	Samba
Sarah & Vito	Quickstep	Paso doble	Viennese waltz	Foxtrot	Samba	Argentine tango	Cha-cha-cha	American Smooth	Couple's choice	Rumba	Samba-thon	Charleston	Tango	Jive	American Smooth	Showdance	Cha-cha-cha
Tasha & Aljaž	Cha-cha-cha	Viennese waltz	Rumba	Charleston	Tango	Samba	Couple's choice	Quickstep	Paso doble	American Smooth	Samba-thon	Argentine tango	Salsa	Waltz	Couple's choice	Showdance	American Smooth
Pete & Jowita	Paso doble	American Smooth	Samba	Quickstep	Rumba	Viennese waltz	Salsa	Couple's choice	Cha-cha-cha	Tango	Samba-thon	Waltz	Foxtrot	Argentine tango			
Montell & Johannes	Foxtrot	Samba	Tango	Viennese waltz	Couple's choice	Cha-cha-cha	Waltz	Paso doble	Salsa	Quickstep	Samba-thon	Rumba					
Jamie & Michelle	Viennese waltz	Rumba	Quickstep	Salsa	Paso doble	American Smooth	Samba	Argentine tango	Jive	Foxtrot	Samba-thon						
Wynne & Katya	Samba	Viennese waltz	Cha-cha-cha	Tango	Quickstep	Salsa	Rumba	American Smooth	Charleston								
Shayne & Nancy	Samba	Tango	Viennese waltz	Cha-cha-cha	American Smooth	Paso doble	Quickstep	Rumba									
Sam & Nikita	Foxtrot	Charleston	Paso doble	Samba	Quickstep	Jive	American Smooth										
Dr. Punam & Gorka	Cha-cha-cha	Foxtrot	Couple's choice	Jive	Viennese waltz	Tango											
Paul & Karen	American Smooth	Salsa	Cha-cha-cha	Quickstep	Samba												
Nick & Luba	Jive	American Smooth	(Note: This couple was excused from competition due to illness or injury, and was granted a bye to the following week.)	Charleston													
Toyah & Neil	Tango	Jive	Samba														
Tom & Nadiya	Tango	Cha-cha-cha															

== Ratings ==
Weekly ratings for each show on BBC One. All ratings are provided by BARB.

Episode	Date	Official rating (millions)	Weekly rank for BBC One	Weekly rank for all UK TV
Launch show	14 September	6.91	1	1
Week 1	21 September	8.13	1	1
Week 2	28 September	7.86	1	1
Week 2 results	29 September	7.04	2	3
Week 3	5 October	8.40	1	1
Week 3 results	6 October	7.44	2	3
Week 4	12 October	7.95	1	1
Week 4 results	13 October	7.33	2	3
Week 5	19 October	8.10	1	1
Week 5 results	20 October	7.58	2	2
Week 6	26 October	8.28	1	1
Week 6 results	27 October	7.54	2	2
Week 7	2 November	8.65	1	1
Week 7 results	3 November	7.90	2	2
Week 8	9 November	8.73	1	1
Week 8 results	10 November	8.18	2	2
Week 9	16 November	9.17	1	2
Week 9 results	17 November	8.05	2	3
Week 10	23 November	9.17	1	2
Week 10 results	24 November	7.94	2	9
Week 11	30 November	9.02	1	1
Week 11 results	1 December	8.08	2	8
Week 12	7 December	8.53	1	2
Week 12 results	8 December	8.02	2	7
Week 13	14 December	9.94	1	1
Series average (excl. launch show)	2024	8.21	—N/a	—N/a
