= Nancy Xu =

Chinese dancer and choreographer

Nancy Xu YouJie
- 许茜
- Born: Xu Qian; 30 July 1991 (age 35); Huaihua, China
- Other name: Nancy Shoes
- Occupations: Dancer; Choreographer
- Known for: Strictly Come Dancing
- Height: 5 ft 6 in (1.68 m)

Chinese name
- Traditional Chinese: 許茜
- Simplified Chinese: 许茜
Transcriptions
Standard Mandarin
- Hanyu Pinyin: Xǔ Qiàn
- IPA: [ɕù tɕʰjɛ̂n]

Nancy Xu YouJie (Chinese: 许茜 SHOO; born 30 July 1991) is a Chinese dancer and choreographer. She is best known for being a professional dancer on Strictly Come Dancing since 2019.

== Early and personal life ==
Xu was born on 30 July 1991 in Huaihua, China. She began dancing at the age of 8 and attended the Guangzhou Dancing School.

Xu is dating bodyguard Mikee Michele, who is also a martial arts expert and choreographer.

== Career ==
Xu specialises in Latin dance and was a finalist in the U21 World Championships in 2010, she finished in third place in the 2010–2012 CBDF National Amateur Latin Championships and was runner-up at the 2013 International Singapore Championship.

Xu appeared on the Chinese version of So You Think You Can Dance in 2014, where she reached the finals. In 2015, she joined the dance company Burn the Floor and performed around the world.

In 2025, Xu, alongside fellow Strictly professional Katya Jones, starred in the short film Dakota Stone. Xu will also star in the upcoming sequel.

== Filmography ==
Year	Title	Role	Notes
2025	Dakota Stone	Dakota Stone	Main cast
2027	Dakota Stone 2.0	Dakota Stone	Main cast

=== Strictly Come Dancing ===
On 30 July 2019, her 28th birthday, Xu was announced as a new professional dancer joining the seventeenth series of Strictly Come Dancing. Xu did not partner a celebrity and instead appeared in the professional group dances throughout the series. Xu was however partnered with EastEnders actor Rudolph Walker for the 2019 Children in Need special where they danced a group Cha-Cha-Cha. Xu returned as a professional for the eighteenth series however was not paired up with a celebrity for the second time and remained part of the dance troupe.

Xu was given a partner for the first time in the nineteenth series when she was paired up with CBBC presenter Rhys Stephenson. The couple were eliminated in the semi-final, coming 4th in the competition. The couple had topped the leader-board twice, once with the Charleston and once with the Argentine tango, but were also in the dance-off four times.

For the twentieth series she was partnered with actor Will Mellor. The couple made it to the semi-final, topping the leaderboard three times in the process, but were eliminated and finished in 5th place.

For the twenty-first series she was partnered with comedian and actor Les Dennis. They were the first couple to be eliminated, after losing the first dance-off of the series to Nikita Kanda and Gorka Márquez.

For the twenty-second series she was partnered with singer and actor Shayne Ward. They were the seventh couple to be eliminated, after losing the dance-off to Wynne Evans and Katya Jones.

Series	Partner	Place	Average Score
19	Rhys Stephenson	4th	34.2
20	Will Mellor	5th	33.3
21	Les Dennis	15th	15.5
22	Shayne Ward	9th	30.3
24	Bethany Antonia	10th	27.4

Highest and Lowest Scoring Per Dance

Dance	Partner	Highest	Partner	Lowest
American Smooth	Will Mellor	33	Bethany Antonia	27
Argentine Tango	Rhys Stephenson	39	Bethany Antonia	25
Cha-cha-cha	Will Mellor	32	Bethany Antonia	27
Charleston	Rhys Stephenson	40	Will Mellor	38
Couple's Choice	Will Mellor	38	Rhys Stephenson	37
Foxtrot	Will Mellor	39	Bethany Antonia	30
Jive	Will Mellor	34	Bethany Antonia	30
Paso Doble	Rhys Stephenson	33	Bethany Antonia	27
Quickstep	Shayne Ward	35	Bethany Antonia	26
Rumba	Shayne Ward	30	Will Mellor	23
Salsa	Rhys Stephenson	31	Will Mellor	26
Samba	Rhys Stephenson	38	Les Dennis	15
Showdance				
Tango	Rhys Stephenson	36	Les Dennis	16
Viennese Waltz	Shayne Ward	33	Rhys Stephenson	27
Waltz	Will Mellor	38	Rhys Stephenson	35

==== Series 19: Rhys Stephenson ====
Week #	Dance/Song	Judges' scores				Total	Result
Week #	Dance/Song	Horwood	Mabuse	Ballas	Du Beke	Total	Result
1	Viennese waltz / "End of the Road"	6	7	7	7	27	No Elimination
2	Cha-cha-cha / "Reach Out I'll Be There"	7	8	8	7	30	Safe
3	Couple's Choice / "Spider-Man"	9	10	9	9	37	Safe
4	Salsa / "Butter"	8	8	7	8	31	Safe
5	American Smooth / "I've Got the world on a String"	8	8	8	8	32	Bottom Two
6	Paso doble / "The Eve of the War"	7	9	9	8	33	Safe
7	Quickstep / "What a Man Gotta Do"	7	9	9	9	34	Safe
8	Charleston / "The Charleston"	10	10	10	10	40	Safe
9	Jive / "Footloose"	8*	8	8	8	32	Bottom Two
10	Waltz / "You Light Up My Life"	7	9*	10	9	35	Bottom Two
11	Argentine tango / "In the Air Tonight"	9	10	10	10	39	Safe
12	Tango / "One Vision"	9	9	9	9	36	Eliminated
12	Samba / "It Had Better Be Tonight (Meglio stasera)"	9	10	10	9	38	Eliminated

- Green number indicates that Rhys and Nancy were at the top of the leaderboard.
- Red number indicates that Rhys and Nancy were at the bottom of the leaderboard.
- *Score awarded by guest judge Cynthia Erivo.

==== Series 20: Will Mellor ====
Week #	Dance/Song	Judges' scores				Total	Result
Week #	Dance/Song	Horwood	Mabuse	Ballas	Du Beke	Total	Result
1	Jive / "Livin' la Vida Loca"	8	9	8	9	34	No Elimination
2	Salsa / "Never Too Much"	6	7	6	7	26	Safe
3	American Smooth / "Cry to Me"	8	9	8	8	33	Safe
4	Rumba / "The Joker and the Queen"	4	7	5	7	23	Safe
5	Viennese waltz / "Line of Duty End Title Theme"	8	8	8	8	32	Safe
6	Cha-cha-cha / "Mama Told Me Not to Come"	8	8	8	8	32	Safe
7	Quickstep / "Soda Pop"	8	8	8	9	33	Safe
8	Waltz / "Three Times a Lady"	9	10	10	9	38	Safe
9	Samba / "I Go to Rio"	8	9	9	9	35	Safe
10	Charleston / "Hush"	9	10	10	9	38	Safe
11	Foxtrot / "Sun and Moon"	9	10	10	10	39	Safe
12	Paso doble / "Uccen – DWTS Remix"	7	9	7	9	32	Eliminated
12	Couple's Choice / "Know How" / "Fools Gold" / "Step On"	9	10	9	10	38	Eliminated

- Green number indicates that Will and Nancy were at the top of the leaderboard.
- Red number indicates that Will and Nancy were at the bottom of the leaderboard.

==== Series 21: Les Dennis ====
Week #	Dance/Song	Judges' scores				Total	Result
Week #	Dance/Song	Horwood	Mabuse	Ballas	Du Beke	Total	Result
1	Tango / "Don't You Want Me"	2	4	5	5	16	No Elimination
2	Samba / "Rock the Boat"	2	4	4	5	15	Eliminated

- Red number indicates that Les and Nancy were at the bottom of the leaderboard.

==== Series 22: Shayne Ward ====
Week #	Dance/Song	Judges' scores				Total	Result
Week #	Dance/Song	Horwood	Mabuse	Ballas	Du Beke	Total	Result
1	Samba / "Do I Do"	4	6	5	6	21	No Elimination
2	Tango / "The Door"	7	8	8	8	31	Safe
3	Viennese waltz / "If I Can Dream"	8	9	8	8	33	Safe
4	Cha-cha-cha / "Ain't No Love (Ain't No Use)"	7	8	7	8	30	Bottom Two
5	American Smooth / "Get Here"	7	8	8	8	31	Safe
6	Paso Doble / "In the Hall of the Mountain King"	8	8	7	8	31	Bottom Two
7	Quickstep / "Help!" & "Hey Jude"	8	9	9	9	35	Safe
8	Rumba / "Time After Time"	7	8	7	8	30	Eliminated

- Red number indicates that Shayne and Nancy were at the bottom of the leaderboard.

==== Series 24: Bethany Antonia ====
Week #	Dance/Song	Judges' scores				Total	Result
Week #	Dance/Song	Horwood	Mabuse	Ballas	Du Beke	Total	Result
1	Quickstep / "Stop This Flame"	6	7	6	7	26	No Elimination
2	Paso Doble / "No Good Deed"	6	7	7	7	27	Safe
3	American Smooth / "Love Song"	6	7	7	7	27	Safe
4	Cha-cha-cha / "Respect"	6	7	7	7	27	Bottom Two
5	Argentine tango / "All the Things She Said"	5	7	6	7	25	Safe
6	Jive / "I'm in Love with a Monster"	7	8	7	8	30	Bottom Three
7	Foxtrot / "Bleeding Love"	6	9	7	8	30	Eliminated

=== Strictly Come Dancing Christmas Special ===
Xu danced a Quickstep with Jamie Borthwick for the 2023 Strictly Come Dancing Christmas Special, achieving the maximum 40 points from the judges and winning the competition.

Xu danced with Harry Aikines-Aryeetey for the 2024 Strictly Come Dancing Christmas Special.

Xu danced with Babatunde Aléshé for the 2025 Strictly Come Dancing Christmas Special.
