= Gorka Márquez =

Spanish dancer and choreographer (born 1990)

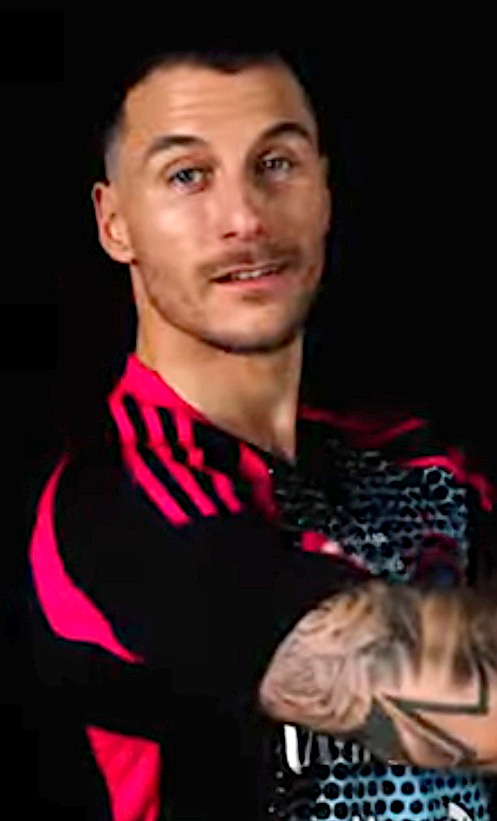
- Márquez in Soccer Aid for UNICEF 2025
- Born: 4 September 1990 (age 36); Bilbao, Basque Country, Spain
- Known for: Strictly Come Dancing
- Partner: Gemma Atkinson
- Children: 2

Gorka Márquez (Spanish: [ˈgoɾ.ka 'maɾ.keθ]; born 4 September 1990) is a Spanish professional dancer, best known for appearing on the British dance show Strictly Come Dancing.

== Early life ==
Márquez began dancing at the age of 12, and in 2010 he represented Spain at the World Latin Championships, before reaching the semi-finals of the 2012 World DanceSport Federation World Cup. In 2014, Márquez joined the touring live dance show Burn the Floor as one of their leads, performing with the dance company all over the world.

== Strictly Come Dancing ==
In 2016, Márquez became a professional dancer on the BBC ballroom dancing show Strictly Come Dancing for its fourteenth series. He was partnered with EastEnders actress Tameka Empson, and they were eliminated in week three of the competition.

In 2017, Márquez returned in the show's fifteenth series. He was partnered with singer and former The X Factor winner, Alexandra Burke. They reached the final, finishing as joint runners-up. With Burke, Márquez broke the record for achieving the most tens in a single series with 32, surpassing Danny Mac and Oti Mabuse's previous record of 28 tens, and held it until the twenty-second series, when Burke and Marquez were topped by Tasha Ghouri and Aljaž Škorjanec, who achieved the new record of scoring 33 tens in a single series.

In 2018, he participated in the show's sixteenth series, where he was partnered with television presenter and campaigner Katie Piper. The couple were eliminated in week four of the competition, finishing in 13th place.

The following year, Márquez announced that he had been demoted from the main professional line-up, but explained that he would still participate in the weekly group dances.

In 2020, he returned as a professional for the show's eighteenth series, reaching the final with EastEnders actress Maisie Smith.

In 2021, Márquez returned in the show's nineteenth series, reaching week three with Coronation Street actress Katie McGlynn.

In 2022, he returned in the show's twentieth series, reaching the final with television presenter Helen Skelton.

In 2023, in the show's twenty-first series, he was partnered with Nikita Kanda and in week three the couple were second to be eliminated.

In 2024, in the show's twenty-second series, he was partnered with Punam Krishan and in week six the couple were fifth to be eliminated.

In 2025, in the show's twenty-third series, he wasn't partnered with a celebrity, because of his filming commitments with the Spanish version of the show, Bailando con las estrellas.

In April 2026, Márquez announced that he was leaving the show.

=== Highest and lowest scores ===
Series	Partner	Place	Average score
14	Tameka Empson	14th	27.7
15	Alexandra Burke	2nd	36.4
16	Katie Piper	13th	17.5
18	Maisie Smith	2nd	36.4
19	Katie McGlynn	14th	22.3
20	Helen Skelton	2nd	34.0
21	Nikita Kanda	14th	19.0
22	Dr. Punam Krishan	11th	22.8

==== Highest and lowest scores per dance ====
Dance	Partner	Highest	Partner	Lowest
American Smooth	Alexandra Burke	40	Katie McGlynn	24
Argentine Tango	Alexandra Burke	38	Helen Skelton	37
Cha-Cha-Cha	Alexandra Burke	39	Dr. Punam Krishan	19
Charleston	Alexandra Burke	39	Nikita Kanda	18
Couple's Choice	Maisie Smith; Helen Skelton	40	Dr. Punam Krishan	33
Dance-a-thon	Alexandra Burke	7		
Foxtrot	Helen Skelton	32	Dr. Punam Krishan	18
Jive	Alexandra Burke	40	Katie Piper	18
Paso Doble	Alexandra Burke	36	Katie Piper	13
Quickstep	Alexandra Burke; Helen Skelton; Maisie Smith	39		
Rumba	Alexandra Burke	32		
Salsa	Alexandra Burke	40	Helen Skelton	32
Samba	Maisie Smith	39	Helen Skelton	29
Showdance	Maisie Smith	40	Helen Skelton	37
Tango	Alexandra Burke	35	Katie McGlynn	22
Viennese Waltz	Alexandra Burke; Maisie Smith	39	Dr. Punam Krishan	21
Waltz	Helen Skelton	35	Katie Piper	17

Tameka Empson is the only celebrity not to appear on this list.

=== Series 14: with Tameka Empson ===
Week #	Dance/Song	Judges' scores				Total	Result
Week #	Dance/Song	Horwood	Bussell	Goodman	Tonioli	Total	Result
1	Paso Doble / "Y Viva España"	6	6	7	7	26	No elimination
2	Charleston / "Yes Sir, That's My Baby"	7	7	7	8	29	Safe
3	Tango / "The Heat is On"	6	7	7	8	28	Eliminated

=== Series 15: with Alexandra Burke ===
Week #	Dance/Song	Judges' scores				Total	Result
Week #	Dance/Song	Horwood	Bussell	Ballas	Tonioli	Total	Result
1	Waltz / "(You Make Me Feel Like) A Natural Woman"	5	6	6	7	24	No elimination
2	Paso Doble / "On the Floor"	9	9	9	9	36	Safe
3	American Smooth / "Wouldn't It Be Loverly"	8	8	8	9	33	Safe
4	Jive / "Proud Mary"	9	10	10	10	39	Safe
5	Samba / "Shape of You"	7	8	8	-	23	Safe
6	Tango / "Maneater"	9	9	9	8	35	Safe
7	Cha-cha-cha / "I've Got the Music in Me"	9	10	10	10	39	Safe
8	Argentine Tango / "Mi Confesión"	9	9	10	10	38	Safe
9	Quickstep / "The Gold Diggers' Song (We're in the Money)"	9	10	10	10	39	Safe
10	Rumba / "Halo"; Paso Doble-a-thon / "España cañí"	7 Awarded	8; 7	8 extra	9 points	32; 39	Bottom two
11	Charleston / "Supercalifragilisticexpialidocious"	9	10	10	10	39	Bottom two
12	Viennese Waltz / "Everybody Hurts"; Salsa / "Finally"	9; 10	10; 10	10; 10	10; 10	39; 40	Safe
13	American Smooth / "Wouldn't It Be Loverly"; Showdance / "There's No Business Like Show Business"; Jive / "Proud Mary"	10; 9; 10	10; 10; 10	10; 10; 10	10; 10; 10	40; 39; 40	Runner-Up

=== Series 16: with Katie Piper ===
Week #	Dance/Song	Judges' scores				Total	Result
Week #	Dance/Song	Horwood	Bussell	Ballas	Tonioli	Total	Result
1	Waltz / "When We Were Young"	4	4	4	5	17	No elimination
2	Paso Doble / "Confident"	2	4	3	4	13	Safe
3	Foxtrot / "City of Stars"	5	5	6	6	22	Safe
4	Jive / "Why Do Fools Fall in Love"	3	5	5	5	18	Eliminated

=== Series 18: with Maisie Smith ===
Week #	Dance/Song	Judges' scores			Total	Result
Week #	Dance/Song	Horwood	Ballas	Mabuse	Total	Result
1	Samba / "Samba (Conga)"	8	8	8	24	No elimination
2	Tango / "Midnight Sky"	8	9	8	25	Safe
3	American Smooth / "Into the Unknown"	8	7	9	24	Safe
4	Cha-cha-cha / "Girls Just Want to Have Fun"	7	8	9	24	Bottom two
5	Salsa / "Better When I'm Dancin'"	9	9	9	27	Bottom two
6	Quickstep / "When You're Smiling"	9	10	10	29	Safe
7	Jive / "Little Shop of Horrors"	9	10	9	28	Safe
8	Jazz / "Gettin' Jiggy with It"; Viennese Waltz / "A Thousand Years"	10; 9	10; 10	10; 10	30; 29	Safe
9	Samba / "Samba (Conga)"; Showdance / "We Need A Little Christmas"; Quickstep / "When You're Smiling"	9; 10; 9	10; 10; 10	9; 10; 10	29; 30; 29	Runner-Up

=== Series 19: with Katie McGlynn ===
Week #	Dance/Song	Judges' scores				Total	Result
Week #	Dance/Song	Horwood	Mabuse	Ballas	Du Beke	Total	Result
1	Tango / "Black Hole"	6	5	5	6	22	No elimination
2	Jive / "Good 4 U"	4	6	5	6	21	Bottom two
3	American Smooth / "Cruella de Vil"	5	7	6	6	24	Eliminated

=== Series 20: with Helen Skelton ===
Week #	Dance/Song	Judges' scores				Total	Result
Week #	Dance/Song	Horwood	Mabuse	Ballas	Du Beke	Total	Result
1	American Smooth / "You Send Me"	6	7	6	7	26	No elimination
2	Cha-cha-cha / "Rain on Me"	5	7	7	8	27	Safe
3	Viennese waltz / "Hopelessly Devoted to You"	7	8	8	8	31	Safe
4	Paso Doble / "Tamacun"	6	8	7	8	29	Safe
5	Charleston / "Barnacle Bill"	8	9	9	9	35	Safe
6	Foxtrot / "Lil' Red Riding Hood"	7	8	8	9	32	Safe
7	Jive / "Tightrope"	9	9	9	10	37	Safe
8	Salsa / "Despacito"	8	8	8	8	32	Safe
9	Quickstep / "Valerie"	9	10	10	10	39	Safe
10	Samba / "Eso Beso"	5	8	8	8	29	Safe
11	Couple's Choice / "Mein Herr"	9	10	10	10	39	Safe
12	Waltz / "Only One Road"; Argentine Tango / "Here Comes the Rain Again"	8; 9	9; 10	9; 8	9; 10	35; 37	Safe
13	Jive / "Tightrope"; Showdance / "Shine"; Couple's Choice / "Mein Herr"	9; 8; 10	10; 10; 10	10; 9; 10	10; 10; 10	39; 37; 40	Runner-up

=== Series 21: with Nikita Kanda ===
Week #	Dance/Song	Judges' scores				Total	Result
Week #	Dance/Song	Horwood	Mabuse	Ballas	Du Beke	Total	Result
1	Waltz / "Run to You"	3	5	5	5	18	No elimination
2	Charleston / "Single Ladies (Put a Ring on It)"	3	5	5	5	18	Bottom two
3	Jive / "Kids in America"	4	6	5	6	21	Eliminated

=== Series 22: with Dr. Punam Krishan ===
Week #	Dance/Song	Judges' scores				Total	Result
Week #	Dance/Song	Horwood	Mabuse	Ballas	Du Beke	Total	Result
1	Cha-cha-cha / "Love at First Sight"	4	5	5	5	19	No elimination
2	Foxtrot / "Man! I Feel Like a Woman!"	4	5	4	5	18	Safe
3	Couple's choice / "Bole Chudiyan"	8	9	8	8	33	Safe
4	Jive / "2 Be Loved (Am I Ready)"	4	5	5	6	20	Safe
5	Viennese waltz / "She's Always a Woman"	4	6	5	6	21	Safe
6	Tango / "Sweet Dreams"	6	7	6	7	26	Eliminated

== Bailando con las Estrellas ==
Marquez features on the Spanish version of Strictly Come Dancing which is called "Bailando con las Estrellas".

Since Season 2, he has been a judge on the show. Due to this, in 2025, he did not get a celebrity partner in the UK Strictly Come Dancing, due to priority of filming commitments in Spain.

== Dance tours and other professional engagements ==
In October 2025 Márquez announced he would be teaching & performing with Karen Hauer at Donahey's 2026 Dancing with The Stars Weekends. In December 2026, Márquez guest starred in the UK tour of Xmas on the Dancefloor.

== Strictly Come Dancing Christmas Special ==
He danced with his partner, Gemma, for the 2019 Strictly Come Dancing Christmas Special.

It was announced he would dance with Keisha Buchanan for the 2023 Strictly Come Dancing Christmas Special.

He danced with Vogue Williams in the 2024 Strictly Come Dancing Christmas Special after her original partner Carlos Gu got injured.

== Personal life ==
Márquez got engaged to the British actress Gemma Atkinson on Valentine's Day 2021. Atkinson gave birth to a baby girl, Mia on 4 July 2019. On 19 July 2023, Atkinson announced she had given birth to their second child, a boy, Thiago Thomas.

In 2025 Márquez was a substitute, in the Rest of the World team, in the Soccer Aid for UNICEF game, who were victorious defeating England XI 5–4.

He is a supporter of Manchester United F. C.
