= Lauren Oakley =

English dancer (born 1991)

- Born: Lauren May Oakley; 28 February 1991 (age 35); Birmingham, England, United Kingdom
- Occupations: Ballroom dancer, Latin dancer, choreographer
- Known for: Burn the Floor; Strictly Come Dancing

Lauren May Oakley (born 28 February 1991) is a British professional dancer and choreographer from Birmingham, England, best known for appearing as a professional on the BBC One television series Strictly Come Dancing.

== Early life ==
Oakley was born on 28 February 1991 in Birmingham. She began dancing at the age of 2 and began competing in Ballroom and Latin dance at the age of 7.

== Career ==
Oakley became Juvenile Champion at the Blackpool Dance Festival, winning across both Ballroom and Latin disciplines and also became Under 21 British National Champion before beginning a career on stage. She has toured the world as part of the live dance show Burn the Floor and has starred as the "leading lady" in the national tour Him & Me alongside Giovanni Pernice and Anton Du Beke. and has starred in Pernice's solo tour This Is Me.

In November 2026, it was announced that Oakley would play Roxie Hart in a nationwide tour of Chicago in 2027.

=== Strictly Come Dancing ===
In July 2022, Oakley was announced to be joining the twentieth series of Strictly Come Dancing as a professional, along with Vito Coppola, Carlos Gu, and Michelle Tsiakkas. Upon her appointment as a professional, Oakley said "[She had] grown up watching Strictly, always hoping that one day [she] could be part of the best show on television, doing what [she loves] the most. Now that it’s happening, it doesn’t quite seem real. I can’t wait to start this new sequined adventure and join this incredible family." Oakley did not partner a celebrity for her first series, and instead took part in the professional group routines.

The following year, she was paired with presenter and journalist Krishnan Guru-Murthy for the twenty-first series. They were eliminated in the eighth week of the competition after losing the dance off to Angela Rippon and Kai Widdrington.

Oakley returned for the twenty-second series and did not receive a celebrity partner. She danced however, with JLS singer JB Gill in the show's 7th week, standing in for an ill Amy Dowden. The following Monday it was confirmed that Oakley would partner Gill for the remainder of the series, as Dowden withdrew from the series due to a foot injury. The couple reached the final, but ultimately lost out to Chris McCausland and his partner Dianne Buswell.

Series	Partner	Place	Average Score
21	Krishnan Guru-Murthy	8th	26.4
22	JB Gill	2nd	35.6
23	Jimmy Floyd Hasselbaink	11th	27.8
24	Graeme Hall		26.7

Dance	Partner	Highest	Partner	Lowest
American Smooth	Graeme Hall	32	Jimmy Floyd Hasselbaink	30
Argentine Tango				
Cha-cha-cha	Jimmy Floyd Hasselbaink	25	Krishnan Guru-Murthy	22
Charleston	JB Gill	39	Krishnan Guru-Murthy	30
Couple's Choice	JB Gill	39	Graeme Hall	28
Dance-a-thon	JB Gill	7		
Foxtrot	Krishnan Guru-Murthy	20		
Jive	Graeme Hall	25		
Paso Doble	JB Gill	39	Krishnan Guru-Murthy	28
Quickstep	JB Gill	35	Jimmy Floyd Hasselbaink Graeme Hall	27
Rumba	Jimmy Floyd Hasselbaink	28		
Salsa	JB Gill	40	Graeme Hall	28
Samba	JB Gill	40	Graeme Hall Krishnan Guru-Murthy	25
Showdance	JB Gill	39		
Tango	Graeme Hall	31		
Viennese Waltz	JB Gill	40	Krishnan Guru-Murthy	27
Waltz	Graeme Hall	31		

==== Series 21 ====
Celebrity partner: Krishnan Guru-Murthy

Week	Dance	Music	Judges' scores (Note: Individual judges' scores are listed in the following order: Craig Revel Horwood, Motsi Mabuse, Shirley Ballas, Anton Du Beke.)				Total score	Result
1	Cha-cha-cha	"Boom Shack-A-Lak"	5	6	6	5	22	No Elimination
2	Foxtrot	"Love Really Hurts Without You"	4	5	5	6	20	Safe
3	Charleston	"Money, Money"	8	8	7	7	30	Safe
4	Paso Doble	"By the Way"	6	7	7	8	28	Safe
5	Quickstep	"The Lady Is a Tramp"	6	8	8	8	30	Safe
6	Viennese waltz	"Kiss from a Rose"	6	7	6	8	27	Safe
7	Couple's Choice	"You Can Call Me Al"	6	8	8	7	29	Safe
8	Samba	"Bamboléo"	5	7	6	7	25	Eliminated

==== Series 22 ====
Celebrity partner: JB Gill

Week	Dance	Music	Judges' scores (Note: Individual judges' scores are listed in the following order: Craig Revel Horwood, Motsi Mabuse, Shirley Ballas, Anton Du Beke.)				Total score	Result
7	Couple's Choice	"Uptown Funk", "Treasure", "24K Magic"	9	10	10	10	39	Safe
8	Samba	"Mas que Nada"	9	9	9	10	37	Safe
9	Quickstep	"Never Gonna Give You Up"	8	9	9	9	35	Safe
10	Charleston; Samba-a-thon	"Yes Sir, That's My Baby" "Conga" & "La Vida Es Un Carnaval"	9	10	10	10	46 (Note: JB & Lauren were awarded 7 extra points for coming first place in the Samba-a-thon.)	Safe
11	Viennese waltz	"Let's Go Fly a Kite"	9	10	10	10	39	Safe
12	Paso Doble	"Requiem for a Tower"	9	10	10	10	39	Safe
12	Salsa	"Red Alert"	10	10	10	10	40	
13	Viennese waltz Showdance; Samba	"Let's Go Fly a Kite" "Ain't No Mountain High Enough" "Mas que Nada"	10; 9; 10	10; 10; 10	10; 10; 10	10; 10; 10	40; 39; 40	Runners-Up

==== Series 23 ====
Celebrity partner: Jimmy Floyd Hasselbaink

Week	Dance	Music	Judges' scores (Note: Individual judges' scores are listed in the following order: Craig Revel Horwood, Motsi Mabuse, Shirley Ballas, Anton Du Beke.)				Total score	Result
1	Quickstep	"Chelsea Dagger"	6	7	7	7	27	No Elimination
2	Cha cha cha	"I Heard It Through the Grapevine"	6	6	6	7	25	Safe
3	Rumba	"No Time to Die"	7	7	6	8	28	Safe
4	Couple's choice	"Rock It", "Follow the Leader"	6	8	7	8	29	Safe
5	American Smooth	"Purple Rain"	7	8	7	8	30	Eliminated

==== Series 24 ====
Celebrity partner: Graeme Hall

Week	Dance	Music	Judges' scores (Note: Individual judges' scores are listed in the following order: Craig Revel Horwood, Motsi Mabuse, Shirley Ballas, Anton Du Beke.)				Total score	Result
1	Cha-cha-cha	"Hound Dog"	6	6	6	6	24	No Elimination
2	Waltz	"The Godfather theme"	7	8	8	8	31	Safe
3	Jive	"Reet Petite"	6	6	6	7	25	Safe
4	Salsa	"Gimme! Gimme! Gimme!"/"Voulez-Vous"	7	7	7	7	28	Safe
5	Tango	"Hernando's Hideaway"	7	8	7	9	31	Safe
6	Samba	"Coconut"	6	7	5	7	25	Safe
7	Couple's choice	"The Book of Love"	5	8	7	8	28	Safe

== Dance tours ==
In September 2026, Oakley & Kai Widdrington announced they were to appear at "Dancing With The Stars Weekends" 2027.
