= Strictly Come Dancing series 21 =

Strictly Come Dancing
- Series 21
- Presented by: Tess Daly; Claudia Winkleman
- Judges: Shirley Ballas; Anton Du Beke; Motsi Mabuse; Craig Revel Horwood
- Celebrity winner: Ellie Leach
- Professional winner: Vito Coppola
- No. of episodes: 25

Release
- Original network: BBC One
- Original release: 16 September – 16 December 2023

Series chronology
- ← Previous; Series 20 Next → Series 22

Strictly Come Dancing returned for its twenty-first series with a launch show on 16 September 2023 on BBC One, with live shows beginning on 23 September. Tess Daly and Claudia Winkleman returned as hosts, while Janette Manrara returned to host Strictly Come Dancing: It Takes Two, alongside Fleur East, who was announced as the new co-host after Rylan Clark's departure in April 2023. In April 2023, the BBC announced that Shirley Ballas, Anton Du Beke, Motsi Mabuse, and Craig Revel Horwood would return to the judging panel.

Actress Ellie Leach and her partner Vito Coppola were announced as the winners on 16 December, while Layton Williams and Nikita Kuzmin, and Bobby Brazier and Dianne Buswell were the runners-up.

== Format ==
Hosts and Judges for Strictly Come Dancing Series 21

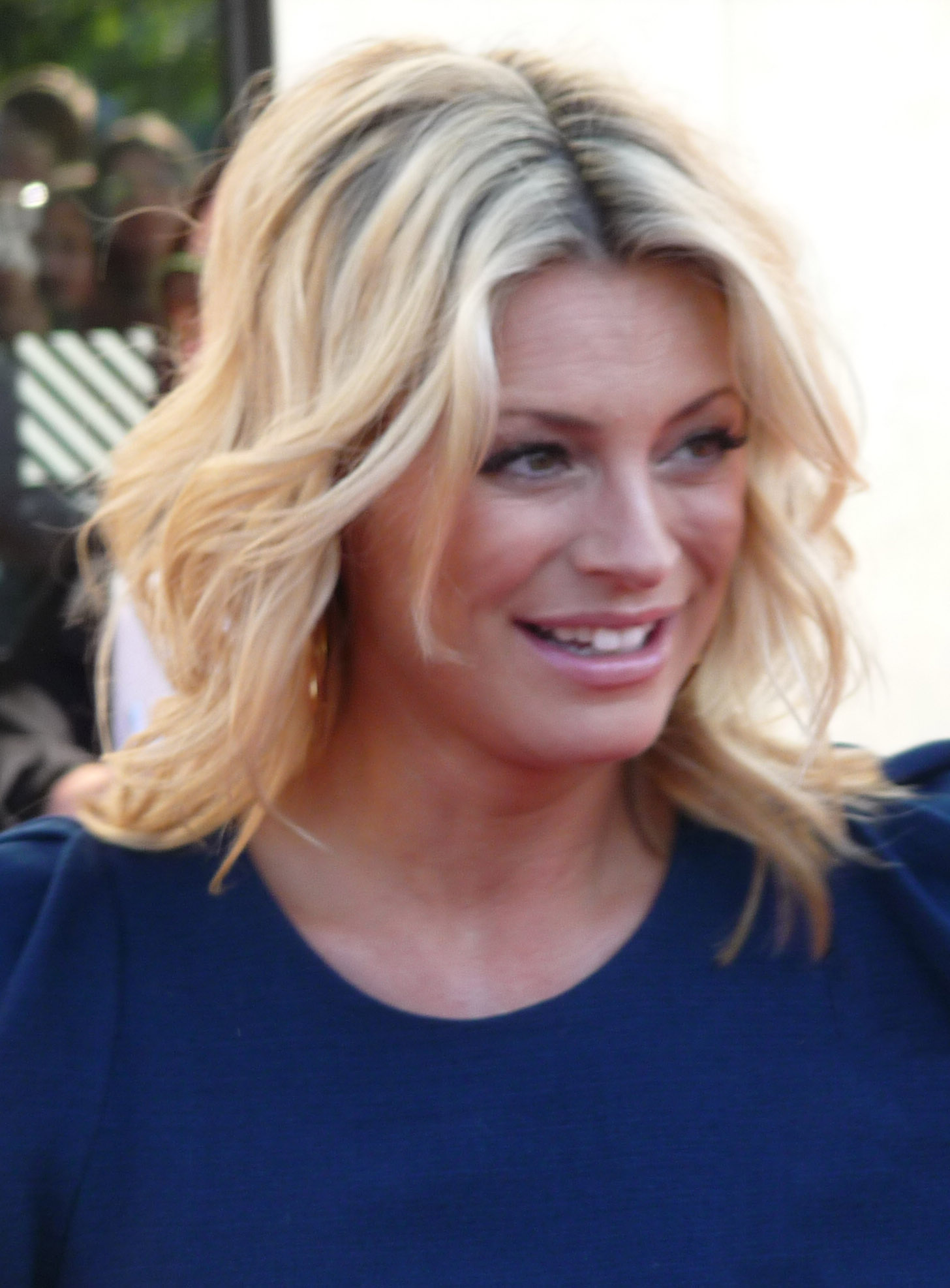
Tess Daly

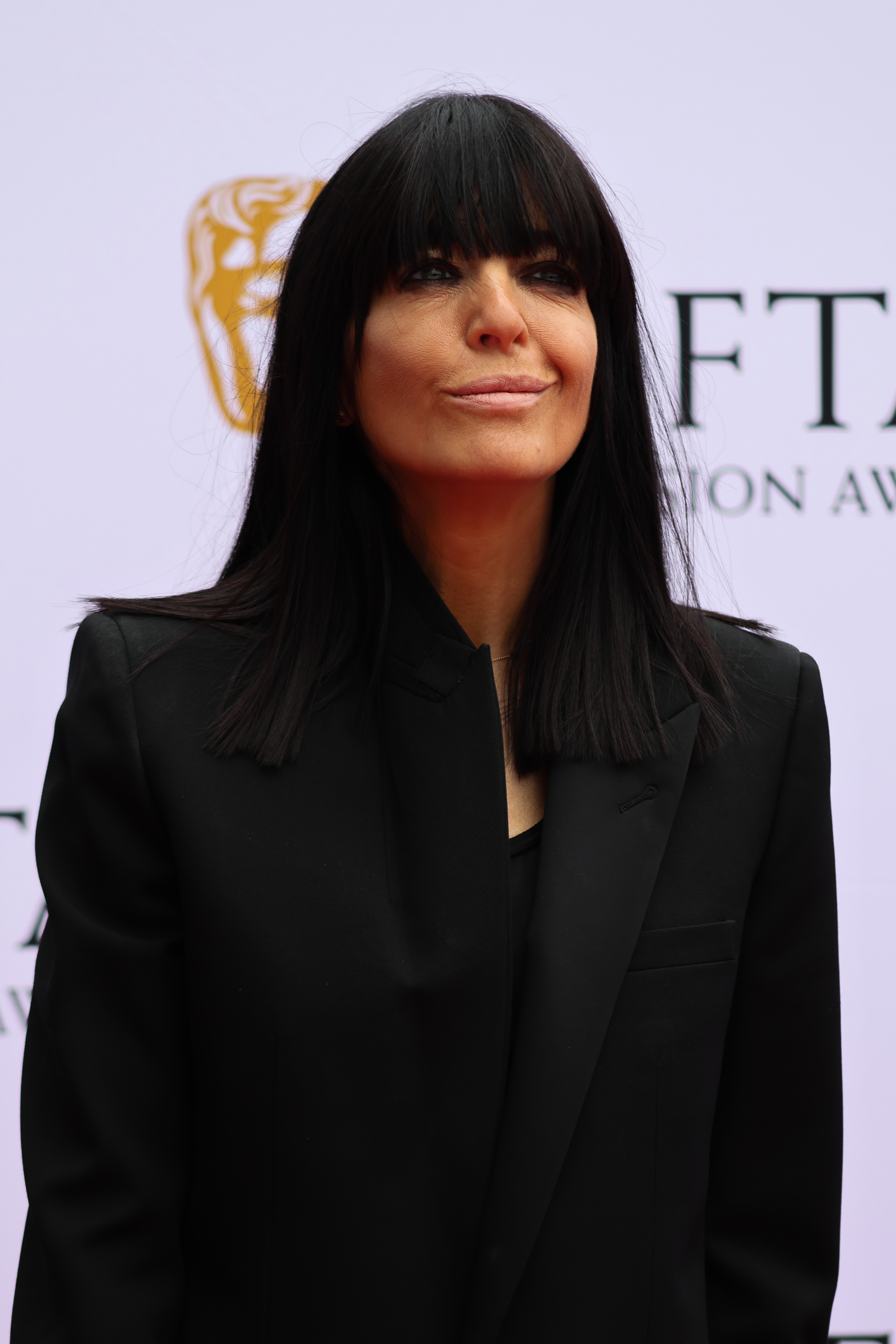
Claudia Winkleman

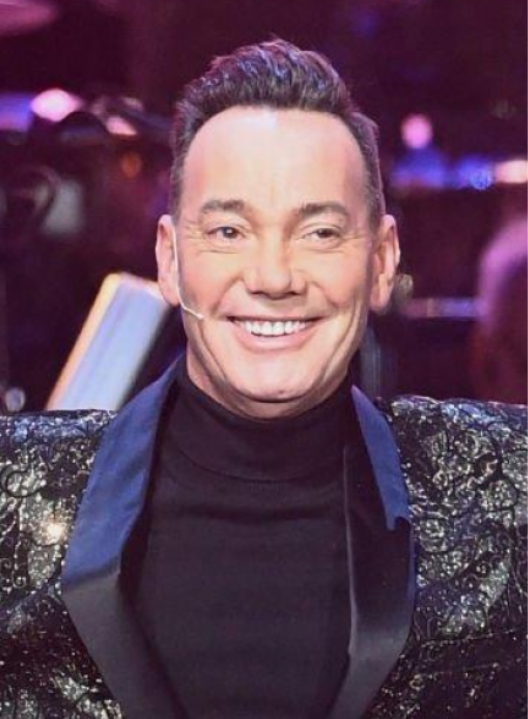
Craig Revel Horwood

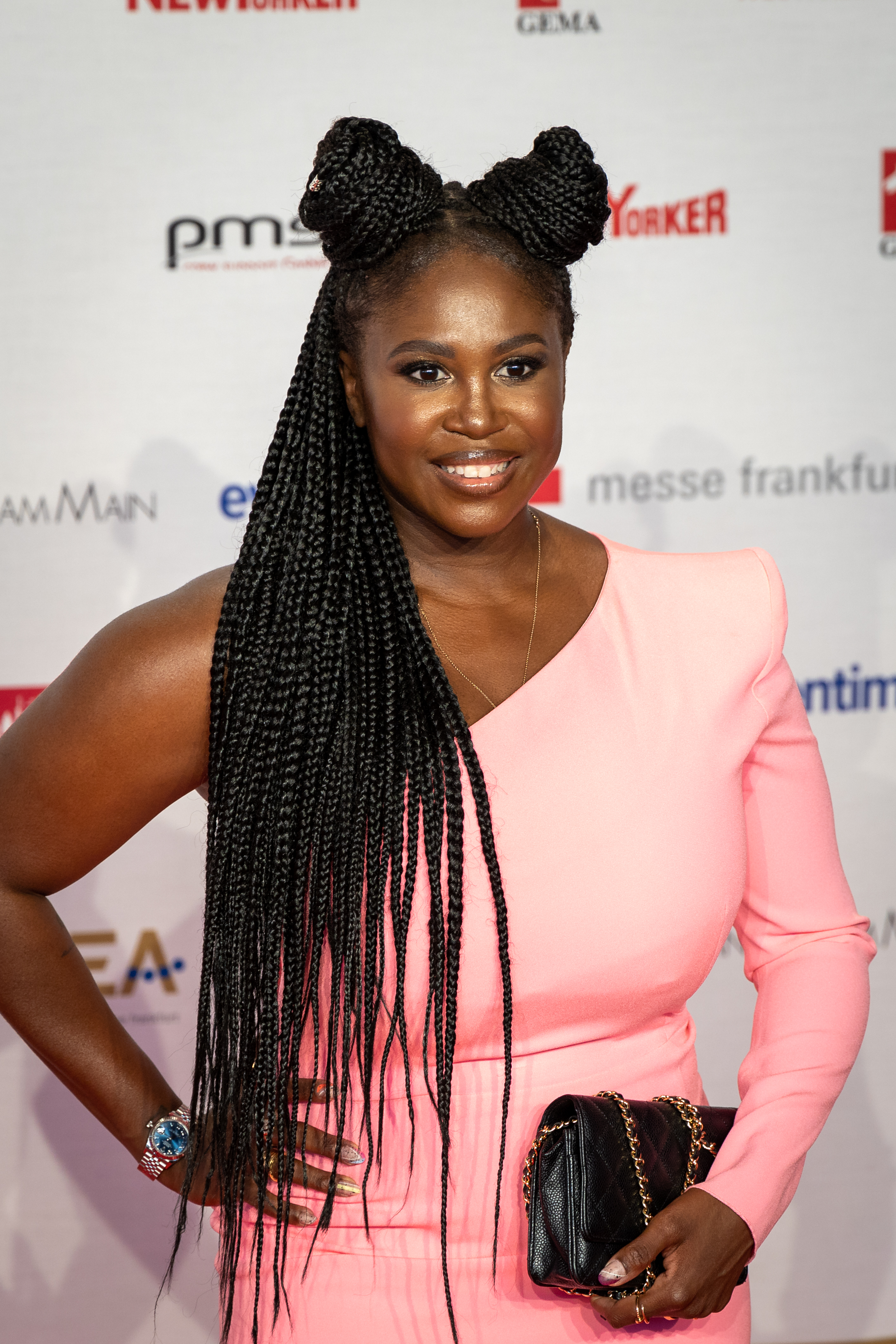
Motsi Mabuse

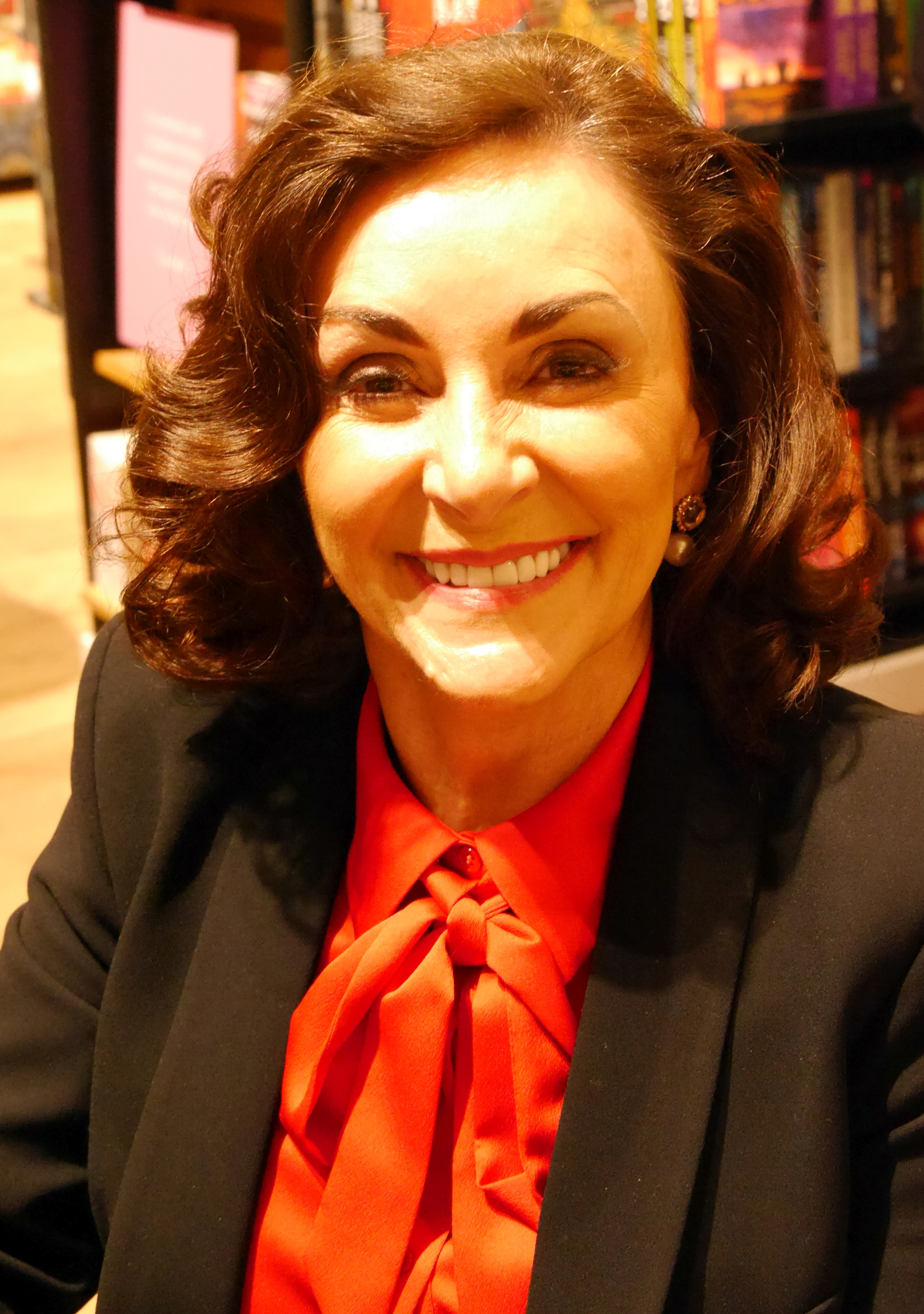
Shirley Ballas

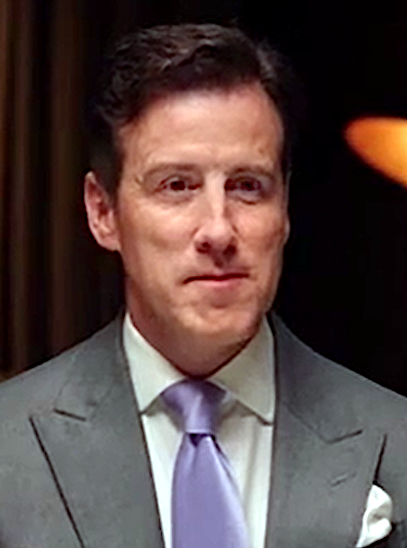
Anton Du Beke

The couples dance each week in a live show. The judges score each performance out of ten. The couples are then ranked according to the judges' scores and given points according to their rank, with the lowest scored couple receiving one point, and the highest scored couple receiving the most points (the maximum number of points available depends on the number of couples remaining in the competition). The public are also invited to vote for their favourite couples, and the couples are ranked again according to the number of votes they receive, again receiving points; the couple with the fewest votes receiving one point, and the couple with the most votes receiving the most points.

The points for judges' score and public vote are then added together, and the two couples with the fewest points are placed in the bottom two. If two couples have equal points, the points from the public vote are given precedence. As with the previous series, the bottom two couples have to perform a dance-off on the results show. Based on that performance alone, each judge then votes on which couple should stay and which couple should leave, with Shirley Ballas, as head judge, having the last and deciding vote if needed.

== Professional dancers ==
In April 2023, the BBC announced that Dianne Buswell, Nadiya Bychkova, Vito Coppola, Graziano Di Prima, Amy Dowden, Carlos Gu, Karen Hauer, Katya Jones, Neil Jones, Nikita Kuzmin, Gorka Márquez, Luba Mushtuk, Lauren Oakley, Giovanni Pernice, Jowita Przystał, Johannes Radebe, Michelle Tsiakkas, Kai Widdrington, and Nancy Xu would be returning to the series. The only professional dancer who did not return was Cameron Lombard, who had been part of the professional group routines since the nineteenth series.

In May 2023, Dowden announced she had been diagnosed with grade III breast cancer and underwent a mastectomy, but added she was "determined" to get back on the dance floor and that she was hoping to take part in the series if she was able to. Despite her initial plans to return for the series, Dowden confirmed in July that she had been diagnosed with "another type of cancer" and would be unable to partner a celebrity due to undergoing chemotherapy.

During the launch show, Lauren Oakley received a celebrity partner for the first time, while Neil Jones, Nadiya Bychkova, and Michelle Tsiakkas did not receive a partner. The rest of the pros were paired to a celebrity, including Luba Mushtuk, who did not have a celebrity partner for the last two series.

== Couples ==
This series features fifteen celebrity contestants. On 4 August 2023, the first three celebrities announced as participants in the series were Amanda Abbington, Angela Rippon, and Layton Williams. Celebrity contestants continued to be revealed until 11 August 2023, when the full line-up was announced.

On 23 October, it was announced that Amanda Abbington had withdrawn from the competition after having missed the previous week.

On 2 December, hours before the live episode was set to air, it was announced that Nigel Harman had been forced to withdraw from the competition due to a rib injury.

Celebrity	Notability	Professional partner	Status
Les Dennis	Comedian, actor & television presenter	Nancy Xu	Eliminated 1st on 1 October 2023
Nikita Kanda	BBC Asian Network presenter	Gorka Márquez	Eliminated 2nd on 8 October 2023
Jody Cundy	Paralympic cyclist & swimmer	Jowita Przystał	Eliminated 3rd on 15 October 2023
Eddie Kadi	Comedian & BBC Radio 1Xtra presenter	Karen Hauer	Eliminated 4th on 22 October 2023
Amanda Abbington	Stage & screen actress	Giovanni Pernice	Withdrew on 23 October 2023
Zara McDermott	Media personality & television presenter	Graziano Di Prima	Eliminated 5th on 29 October 2023
Adam Thomas	Waterloo Road & Emmerdale actor	Luba Mushtuk	Eliminated 6th on 5 November 2023
Krishnan Guru-Murthy	Channel 4 News presenter & journalist	Lauren Oakley	Eliminated 7th on 12 November 2023
Angela Rippon	Television presenter, journalist & newsreader	Kai Widdrington	Eliminated 8th on 19 November 2023
Angela Scanlon	Television presenter	Carlos Gu	Eliminated 9th on 26 November 2023
Nigel Harman	Stage & screen actor	Katya Jones	Withdrew on 2 December 2023
Annabel Croft	Professional tennis player & pundit	Johannes Radebe	Eliminated 10th on 10 December 2023
Bobby Brazier	EastEnders actor & model	Dianne Buswell	Runners-up on 16 December 2023
Layton Williams	Bad Education actor & West End performer	Nikita Kuzmin	Runners-up on 16 December 2023
Ellie Leach	Coronation Street actress	Vito Coppola	Winners on 16 December 2023

== Scoring chart ==
The highest score each week is indicated in bold green with a dagger (†), while the lowest score each week is indicated in italicized red with a double-dagger (‡).

Colour key

Winners
Runners-up
Excused from competition for the week
Withdrew from competition
Bottom two
Eliminated

Strictly Come Dancing (series 21) - Weekly scores
Couple	Pl.	Week														
Couple	Pl.	1	2	1+2	3	4	5	6	7	8	9	10	11	12	11+12	13
Ellie & Vito	1st	29	31	60	33	28	37	**38**†	**39**†	35	**39**†	**38**†	36	37+38=75	111	39+36+40=115‡ (Note: This couple finished in first place.)
Bobby & Dianne	2nd	29	29	58	32	30	32	30	30	32	35 (Note: This couple was in the bottom two, but was not eliminated.)	37	34	38+35=73	107	39+39+39=117 (Note: This couple finished in second place.)
Layton & Nikita	2nd	29	**36**†	**65**†	28	**37**†	**39**†	36	36	**39**†	**39**†	34	**40**†	36+40=**76**†	**116**†	40+39+40=**119**†
Annabel & Johannes	4th	28	22	50	30	29	27	29	35	31	35	36	33‡	32+33=65‡	98‡ (Note: This couple was eliminated.)	
Nigel & Katya	5th	**32**†	27	59	25	33	29	30	33	34	31	33	(Note: This couple withdrew from the competition.)			
Angela S. & Carlos	6th	23	29	52	**35**†	28	28	33	27‡	33	38	31‡				
Angela R. & Kai	7th	28	31	59	26	31	34	33	28	32	28‡					
Krishnan & Lauren	8th	22	20	42	30	28	30	27	29	25‡						
Adam & Luba	9th	19	23	42	26	32	32	32	27‡							
Zara & Graziano	10th	19	23	42	25	28	28	25‡								
Amanda & Giovanni	11th	29	32	61	30	31	(Note: This couple was excused from competition due to illness or injury, and was granted a bye to the following week.)									
Eddie & Karen	12th	22	21	43	34	24	24‡									
Jody & Jowita	13th	21	16	37	20‡	19‡										
Nikita & Gorka	14th	18	18	36	21											
Les & Nancy	15th	16‡	15‡	31‡												

=== Average chart ===
Couple	Rank by average	Total points	Number of dances	Total average
Layton & Nikita	1st	588	16	36.8
Ellie & Vito	2nd	573	16	35.8
Bobby & Dianne	3rd	540	16	33.8
Annabel & Johannes	4th	400	13	30.8
Nigel & Katya	5th	307	10	30.7
Amanda & Giovanni	6th	122	4	30.5
Angela S. & Carlos	6th	305	10	30.5
Angela R. & Kai	8th	271	9	30.1
Adam & Luba	9th	191	7	27.3
Krishnan & Lauren	10th	211	8	26.4
Eddie & Karen	11th	125	5	25.0
Zara & Graziano	12th	148	6	24.7
Jody & Jowita	13th	76	4	19.0
Nikita & Gorka	13th	57	3	19.0
Les & Nancy	15th	31	2	15.5

== Weekly scores ==
Unless indicated otherwise, individual judges scores in the charts below (given in parentheses) are listed in this order from left to right: Craig Revel Horwood, Motsi Mabuse, Shirley Ballas, Anton Du Beke.

=== Launch show ===
- Musical guest: Jessie Ware — "Free Yourself"

=== Week 1 ===
There was no elimination this week; all scores carried over to the following week. Couples are listed in the order they performed.

Couple	Scores	Dance	Music
Adam & Luba	19 (4, 5, 5, 5)	Cha-cha-cha	"Waffle House" — Jonas Brothers
Angela S. & Carlos	23 (6, 6, 5, 6)	Tango	"Prisoner" — Miley Cyrus, feat. Dua Lipa
Eddie & Karen	22 (4, 6, 6, 6)	Quickstep	"Two Hearts" — Phil Collins
Angela R. & Kai	28 (7, 7, 7, 7)	Cha-cha-cha	"Get the Party Started" — Shirley Bassey
Nikita & Gorka	18 (3, 5, 5, 5)	Waltz	"Run to You" — Whitney Houston
Layton & Nikita	29 (7, 8, 7, 7)	Samba	"Touch" — Little Mix
Zara & Graziano	19 (3, 6, 5, 5)	Cha-cha-cha	"Crush" — Jennifer Paige
Les & Nancy	16 (2, 4, 5, 5)	Tango	"Don't You Want Me" — Human League
Ellie & Vito	29 (7, 8, 7, 7)	Jive	"Can't Tame Her" — Zara Larsson
Jody & Jowita	21 (5, 5, 6, 5)	Quickstep	"I'm Sitting on Top of the World" — Bobby Darin
Bobby & Dianne	29 (6, 7, 8, 8)	Foxtrot	"All About You" — McFly
Annabel & Johannes	28 (7, 7, 7, 7)	Cha-cha-cha	"Uptown Girl" — Billy Joel
Amanda & Giovanni	29 (7, 7, 8, 7)	Viennese waltz	"Pointless" — Lewis Capaldi
Krishnan & Lauren	22 (5, 6, 6, 5)	Cha-cha-cha	"Boom Shack-A-Lak" — Apache Indian
Nigel & Katya	32 (8, 8, 8, 8)	Paso doble	"Smells Like Teen Spirit" — Nirvana

=== Week 2 ===
Musical guest: Jorja Smith — "Try Me"

Couples are listed in the order they performed.

Couple	Scores	Dance	Music	Result
Bobby & Dianne	29 (7, 7, 7, 8)	Charleston	"Do Your Thing" — Basement Jaxx	Safe
Annabel & Johannes	22 (4, 6, 6, 6)	Quickstep	"Walking on Sunshine" — Katrina and the Waves	Safe
Jody & Jowita	16 (3, 4, 4, 5)	Paso doble	"Thunderstruck" — AC/DC	Safe
Ellie & Vito	31 (8, 8, 7, 8)	Foxtrot	"Perfect" — Fairground Attraction	Safe
Nigel & Katya	27 (7, 7, 6, 7)	Viennese waltz	"Until I Found You" — Stephen Sanchez	Safe
Nikita & Gorka	18 (3, 5, 5, 5)	Charleston	"Single Ladies (Put a Ring on It)" — Beyoncé	Bottom two
Les & Nancy	15 (2, 4, 4, 5)	Samba	"Rock the Boat" — The Hues Corporation	Eliminated
Adam & Luba	23 (5, 6, 5, 7)	Tango	"Somebody Told Me" — Måneskin	Safe
Amanda & Giovanni	32 (8, 8, 8, 8)	Salsa	"Oye!" — Gloria Estefan	Safe
Krishnan & Lauren	20 (4, 5, 5, 6)	Foxtrot	"Love Really Hurts Without You" — Billy Ocean	Safe
Eddie & Karen	21 (3, 6, 5, 7)	Cha-cha-cha	"Ríe y Llora" — Celia Cruz	Safe
Zara & Graziano	23 (6, 6, 5, 6)	Quickstep	"Anyone for You (Tiger Lily)" — George Ezra	Safe
Angela S. & Carlos	29 (7, 7, 7, 8)	Jive	"Trouble" — Shampoo	Safe
Angela R. & Kai	31 (8, 8, 7, 8)	Foxtrot	"You Make Me Feel So Young" — Frank Sinatra	Safe
Layton & Nikita	36 (9, 9, 9, 9)	Quickstep	"Puttin' On the Ritz" — Gregory Porter	Safe

Judges' votes to save

- Horwood: Nikita & Gorka
- Mabuse: Nikita & Gorka
- Du Beke: Nikita & Gorka
- Ballas: Did not vote, but would have voted to save Nikita & Gorka

=== Week 3: Movie Week ===
Musical guest: Madison Beer — "Showed Me (How I Fell in Love with You)"

Couples are listed in the order they performed.

Couple	Scores	Dance	Music	Film	Result
Nigel & Katya	25 (6, 6, 6, 7)	Jive	"Batman Theme"	Batman	Safe
Angela R. & Kai	26 (6, 7, 6, 7)	Quickstep	"Do-Re-Mi"	The Sound of Music	Safe
Zara & Graziano	25 (6, 6, 6, 7)	Paso doble	"The Puss Suite"	Puss in Boots	Bottom two
Layton & Nikita	28 (7, 7, 7, 7)	Viennese waltz	"There Are Worse Things I Could Do"	Grease	Safe
Angela S. & Carlos	35 (9, 9, 8, 9)	Charleston	"Who's Got the Pain"	Damn Yankees	Safe
Amanda & Giovanni	30 (6, 8, 8, 8)	Rumba	"Out of Reach"	Bridget Jones's Diary	Safe
Nikita & Gorka	21 (4, 6, 5, 6)	Jive	"Kids in America"	Clueless	Eliminated
Ellie & Vito	33 (8, 9, 8, 8)	Viennese waltz	"Waiting on a Miracle"	Encanto	Safe
Bobby & Dianne	32 (8, 8, 8, 8)	Samba	"Young Hearts Run Free"	Romeo + Juliet	Safe
Jody & Jowita	20 (4, 5, 5, 6)	American Smooth	"Married Life"	Up	Safe
Eddie & Karen	34 (8, 8, 10, 8)	Couple's choice	"Men in Black"	Men in Black	Safe
Annabel & Johannes	30 (8, 8, 7, 7)	Waltz	"Moon River"	Breakfast at Tiffany's	Safe
Adam & Luba	26 (5, 7, 7, 7)	Jive	"Take On Me"	The Super Mario Bros. Movie	Safe
Krishnan & Lauren	30 (8, 8, 7, 7)	Charleston	"Money, Money"	Cabaret	Safe

Judges' votes to save

- Horwood: Zara & Graziano
- Mabuse: Zara & Graziano
- Du Beke: Zara & Graziano
- Ballas: Did not vote, but would have voted to save Zara & Graziano

=== Week 4 ===
Musical guest: Beverley Knight— "I'm on Fire"

Couples are listed in the order they performed.

Couple	Scores	Dance	Music	Result
Ellie & Vito	28 (7, 7, 7, 7)	Samba	"Copacabana" — Barry Manilow	Safe
Adam & Luba	32 (8, 8, 8, 8)	Waltz	"I Wonder Why" — Curtis Stigers	Safe
Jody & Jowita	19 (3, 5, 5, 6)	Salsa	"Samba de Janeiro" — Bellini	Eliminated
Amanda & Giovanni	31 (7, 8, 8, 8)	Foxtrot	"Everywhere" — Fleetwood Mac	Safe
Krishnan & Lauren	28 (6, 7, 7, 8)	Paso doble	"By the Way" — Red Hot Chili Peppers	Safe
Zara & Graziano	28 (7, 7, 7, 7)	Viennese waltz	"You Don't Have to Say You Love Me" — Brenda Lee	Safe
Annabel & Johannes	29 (7, 7, 7, 8)	Jive	"Feel It Still" — Portugal. The Man	Safe
Eddie & Karen	24 (4, 7, 6, 7)	American Smooth	"Sex Bomb" — Tom Jones	Bottom two
Layton & Nikita	37 (9, 10, 9, 9)	Cha-cha-cha	"Million Dollar Bill" — Whitney Houston	Safe
Nigel & Katya	33 (8, 9, 8, 8)	Salsa	"Suavemente" — Elvis Crespo	Safe
Angela S. & Carlos	28 (7, 7, 7, 7)	Viennese waltz	"You Are the Reason" — Calum Scott & Leona Lewis	Safe
Angela R. & Kai	31 (8, 7, 8, 8)	Rumba	"Rise Like a Phoenix" — Conchita Wurst	Safe
Bobby & Dianne	30 (7, 7, 8, 8)	Tango	"Fashion" — David Bowie	Safe

Judges' votes to save

- Horwood: Eddie & Karen
- Mabuse: Eddie & Karen
- Du Beke: Eddie & Karen
- Ballas: Did not vote, but would have voted to save Eddie & Karen

=== Week 5 ===
Musical guest: Bastille — "Pompeii"

Amanda Abbington announced that she would be unable to perform on the live show for medical reasons. Under the rules of the show, she was granted a bye to the following week.

Couples are listed in the order they performed.

Couple	Scores	Dance	Music	Result
Annabel & Johannes	27 (5, 7, 7, 8)	Charleston	"Ladies' Night" — Kool & the Gang	Safe
Nigel & Katya	29 (7, 7, 7, 8)	Foxtrot	"I Just Want to Make Love to You" — Etta James	Safe
Eddie & Karen	24 (5, 6, 6, 7)	Samba	"Calm Down" — Rema & Selena Gomez	Eliminated
Krishnan & Lauren	30 (6, 8, 8, 8)	Quickstep	"The Lady Is a Tramp" — Frank Sinatra	Safe
Angela S. & Carlos	28 (6, 7, 7, 8)	American Smooth	"Cherish" — Madonna	Safe
Ellie & Vito	37 (9, 10, 9, 9)	Paso doble	"Insomnia" — Faithless	Safe
Layton & Nikita	39 (9, 10, 10, 10)	Salsa	"Quimbara" — Johnny Pacheco & Celia Cruz	Safe
Bobby & Dianne	32 (7, 8, 8, 9)	Viennese waltz	"Golden Hour" — JVKE	Safe
Adam & Luba	32 (7, 8, 8, 9)	Couple's choice	"Everybody (Backstreet's Back)", "Get Down (You're the One for Me)" & "Larger than Life"; All by the Backstreet Boys	Safe
Zara & Graziano	28 (7, 7, 7, 7)	American Smooth	"Can't Fight the Moonlight" — LeAnn Rimes	Bottom two
Angela R. & Kai	34 (8, 9, 8, 9)	Argentine tango	"Tanguera" — Sexteto Mayor	Safe

Judges' votes to save

- Horwood: Zara & Graziano
- Mabuse: Zara & Graziano
- Du Beke: Zara & Graziano
- Ballas: Did not vote, but would have voted to save Zara & Graziano

=== Week 6: Halloween Week ===
Musical guest: Rick Astley — "Forever and More"

After having missed the previous week, Amanda Abbington withdrew from the competition.

Couples are listed in the order they performed.

Couple	Scores	Dance	Music	Result
Angela S. & Carlos	33 (8, 8, 8, 9)	Paso doble	"BLACK swan SWAN lake" — District 78	Safe
Adam & Luba	32 (7, 9, 8, 8)	American Smooth	"Magic Moments" — Perry Como	Bottom two
Zara & Graziano	25 (6, 6, 6, 7)	Charleston	"Jeepers Creepers" — Al Donahue & His Orchestra	Eliminated
Layton & Nikita	36 (9, 9, 9, 9)	Tango	"Vampire" — Olivia Rodrigo	Safe
Bobby & Dianne	30 (6, 9, 7, 8)	Cha-cha-cha	"Come On-a My House" — Della Reese	Safe
Krishnan & Lauren	27 (6, 7, 6, 8)	Viennese waltz	"Kiss from a Rose" — Seal	Safe
Angela R. & Kai	33 (9, 8, 8, 8)	Charleston	"Theme from Murder, She Wrote" — John Addison	Safe
Annabel & Johannes	29 (7, 7, 7, 8)	Tango	"Need You Tonight" — INXS	Safe
Nigel & Katya	30 (8, 7, 7, 8)	Cha-cha-cha	"I Was Made for Lovin' You" — Kiss	Safe
Ellie & Vito	38 (9, 10, 10, 9)	Salsa	"Murder on the Dancefloor" — Sophie Ellis-Bextor	Safe

Judges' votes to save

- Horwood: Adam & Luba
- Mabuse: Adam & Luba
- Du Beke: Adam & Luba
- Ballas: Did not vote, but would have voted to save Adam & Luba

=== Week 7 ===
Musical guest: Zara Larsson — "On My Love"

Couples are listed in the order they performed.

Couple	Scores	Dance	Music	Result
Layton & Nikita	36 (8, 10, 10, 8)	Jive	"Shake Ur Body" — Shy FX, feat. Di	Safe
Angela R. & Kai	28 (7, 8, 6, 7)	Waltz	"Fascination" — Nat King Cole	Bottom two
Nigel & Katya	33 (7, 9, 9, 8)	Tango	"Nothing Breaks Like a Heart" — Mark Ronson, feat. Miley Cyrus	Safe
Angela S. & Carlos	27 (6, 7, 7, 7)	Samba	"Ain't It Funny" — Jennifer Lopez	Safe
Annabel & Johannes	35 (8, 9, 9, 9)	Couple's choice	"Wings" — Birdy	Safe
Bobby & Dianne	30 (6, 8, 8, 8)	Argentine tango	"Sail" — Awolnation	Safe
Ellie & Vito	39 (9, 10, 10, 10)	American Smooth	"Ain't That a Kick in the Head?" — Robbie Williams	Safe
Adam & Luba	27 (6, 7, 7, 7)	Rumba	"Dancing On My Own" — Calum Scott	Eliminated
Krishnan & Lauren	29 (6, 8, 8, 7)	Couple's choice	"You Can Call Me Al" — Paul Simon	Safe

Judges' votes to save

- Horwood: Angela R. & Kai
- Mabuse: Angela R. & Kai
- Du Beke: Angela R. & Kai
- Ballas: Did not vote, but would have voted to save Angela R. & Kai

=== Week 8 ===
Musical guests: Andrea Bocelli & Virginia Bocelli – "Hallelujah"

Couples are listed in the order they performed.

Couple	Scores	Dance	Music	Result
Krishnan & Lauren	25 (5, 7, 6, 7)	Samba	"Bamboléo" — Gipsy Kings	Eliminated
Bobby & Dianne	32 (7, 8, 8, 9)	American Smooth	"Ghost of You" — 5 Seconds of Summer	Safe
Angela R. & Kai	32 (8, 8, 8, 8)	Paso doble	"Hung Up" — Madonna	Bottom two
Nigel & Katya	34 (8, 8, 9, 9)	Couple's choice	"Just the Way You Are" — Bruno Mars	Safe
Ellie & Vito	35 (8, 9, 9, 9)	Rumba	"True Colors" — Cyndi Lauper	Safe
Annabel & Johannes	31 (7, 8, 8, 8)	Samba	"Whenever, Wherever" — Shakira	Safe
Angela S. & Carlos	33 (7, 9, 8, 9)	Waltz	"With You I'm Born Again" — Billy Preston & Syreeta	Safe
Layton & Nikita	39 (9, 10, 10, 10)	Argentine tango	"Tattoo" — Loreen	Safe

Judges' votes to save

- Horwood: Angela R. & Kai
- Mabuse: Angela R. & Kai
- Du Beke: Angela R. & Kai
- Ballas: Did not vote, but would have voted to save Krishnan & Lauren

=== Week 9: Blackpool Week ===
Musical guests: Madness – "C'est La Vie"

This week's episode was staged in the Tower Ballroom at the Blackpool Tower in Blackpool, Lancashire. Couples are listed in the order they performed.

Couple	Scores	Dance	Music	Result
Bobby & Dianne	35 (8, 9, 9, 9)	Jive	"Wake Me Up Before You Go-Go" — Wham!	Bottom two
Angela R. & Kai	28 (6, 7, 7, 8)	American Smooth	"Tea for Two" — Ella Fitzgerald	Eliminated
Layton & Nikita	39 (9, 10, 10, 10)	Couple's choice	"Ain't No Other Man" — Christina Aguilera	Safe
Annabel & Johannes	35 (8, 9, 9, 9)	American Smooth	"Unchained Melody" — Benedetta Caretta	Safe
Ellie & Vito	39 (9, 10, 10, 10)	Charleston	"Love Machine" — Girls Aloud	Safe
Angela S. & Carlos	38 (8, 10, 10, 10)	Argentine tango	"Back to Black" — Amy Winehouse	Safe
Nigel & Katya	31 (7, 8, 8, 8)	Quickstep	"It Don't Mean a Thing (If It Ain't Got That Swing)" — Duke Ellington	Safe

Judges' votes to save

- Horwood: Bobby & Dianne
- Mabuse: Bobby & Dianne
- Du Beke: Bobby & Dianne
- Ballas: Did not vote, but would have voted to save Bobby & Dianne

=== Week 10 ===
Musical guests: Texas – "Inner Smile"

Couples are listed in the order they performed.

Couple	Scores	Dance	Music	Result
Layton & Nikita	34 (8, 9, 8, 9)	American Smooth	"It's Oh So Quiet" — Björk	Bottom two
Nigel & Katya	33 (8, 8, 8, 9)	Rumba	"It's All Coming Back to Me Now" — Celine Dion	Safe
Annabel & Johannes	36 (8, 9, 9, 10)	Paso doble	"España cañí" — Pascual Marquina Narro	Safe
Angela S. & Carlos	31 (7, 7, 8, 9)	Cha-cha-cha	"I Will Survive" — Gloria Gaynor	Eliminated
Bobby & Dianne	37 (8, 9, 10, 10)	Couple's choice	"This Woman's Work" — Maxwell	Safe
Ellie & Vito	38 (9, 10, 10, 9)	Argentine tango	"Bills, Bills, Bills" — Destiny's Child	Safe

Judges' votes to save

- Horwood: Layton & Nikita
- Mabuse: Layton & Nikita
- Du Beke: Layton & Nikita
- Ballas: Did not vote, but would have voted to save Angela S. & Carlos

=== Week 11: Musicals Week (Quarter-final) ===
Musical guest: Joss Stone – "This Time" (from The Time Traveller's Wife)

Hours before the live performance was to begin, Nigel Harman announced that he had to withdraw from the competition after sustaining an injury. As a result, there was no elimination this week and all scores carried over to the following week.

Couples are listed in the order they performed.

Couple	Scores	Dance	Music	Musical
Ellie & Vito	36 (9, 9, 9, 9)	Quickstep	"Belle"	Beauty and the Beast
Annabel & Johannes	33 (8, 8, 8, 9)	Foxtrot	"For Good"	Wicked
Layton & Nikita	40 (10, 10, 10, 10)	Paso doble	"Backstage Romance"	Moulin Rouge!
Bobby & Dianne	34 (8, 8, 9, 9)	Salsa	"(I've Had) The Time of My Life"	Dirty Dancing

=== Week 12: Semi-final ===
Musical guests: Take That – "This Life"

Each couple performed two routines, and are listed in the order they performed.

Couple	Scores	Dance	Music	Result
Bobby & Dianne	38 (9, 9, 10, 10)	Quickstep	"Mack the Knife" — Bobby Darin	Bottom two
Bobby & Dianne	35 (8, 9, 9, 9)	Paso doble	"Run Boy Run" — Woodkid	Bottom two
Layton & Nikita	36 (9, 9, 9, 9)	Rumba	"Lift Me Up" — Rihanna	Safe
Layton & Nikita	40 (10, 10, 10, 10)	Charleston	"Fit as a Fiddle" — Gene Kelly & Donald O'Connor	Safe
Annabel & Johannes	32 (8, 8, 8, 8)	Salsa	"You'll Be Mine (Party Time)" — Gloria Estefan	Eliminated
Annabel & Johannes	33 (8, 8, 8, 9)	Viennese waltz	"Please Please Please Let Me Get What I Want" — Slow Moving Millie	Eliminated
Ellie & Vito	37 (9, 10, 9, 9)	Cha-cha-cha	"Mambo Italiano" — Bette Midler	Safe
Ellie & Vito	38 (9, 9, 10, 10)	Couple's choice	"Blow Your Mind (Mwah)" & "Physical" — Dua Lipa	Safe

Judges' votes to save

- Horwood: Annabel & Johannes
- Mabuse: Bobby & Dianne
- Du Beke: Bobby & Dianne
- Ballas: Bobby & Dianne

=== Week 13: Final ===
Musical guest: Cher — "DJ Play a Christmas Song"

Each couple performed three routines: one chosen by the judges, their showdance routine, and their favourite dance of the series.

Couple	Scores	Dance	Music	Result
Ellie & Vito	39 (9, 10, 10, 10)	Paso doble	"Insomnia" — 2WEI	Winners
Ellie & Vito	36 (9, 9, 9, 9)	Showdance	"On the Floor" & "Dance Again" — Jennifer Lopez	Winners
Ellie & Vito	40 (10, 10, 10, 10)	American Smooth	"Ain't That a Kick in the Head?" — Robbie Williams	Winners
Bobby & Dianne	39 (9, 10, 10, 10)	Samba	"Young Hearts Run Free" — Candi Staton	Runners-up
Bobby & Dianne	39 (9, 10, 10, 10)	Showdance	"Someone in the Crowd", "Another Day of Sun" & "Epilogue"; All from La La Land	Runners-up
Bobby & Dianne	39 (9, 10, 10, 10)	Couple's choice	"This Woman's Work" — Maxwell	Runners-up
Layton & Nikita	40 (10, 10, 10, 10)	Quickstep	"Puttin' On the Ritz" — Gregory Porter	Runners-up
Layton & Nikita	39 (9, 10, 10, 10)	Showdance	"Friend Like Me" — Ne-Yo	Runners-up
Layton & Nikita	40 (10, 10, 10, 10)	Argentine tango	"Tattoo" — Loreen	Runners-up

== Dance chart ==
The couples performed the following each week:

- Weeks 1–11: One unlearned dance
- Week 12 (Semi-Finals): Two unlearned dances
- Week 13 (Finals): Judges' choice, showdance & favourite dance of the series

Strictly Come Dancing (series 21) - Dance chart
Couple	Week															
Couple	1	2	3	4	5	6	7	8	9	10	11	12		13		
Ellie & Vito	Jive	Foxtrot	Viennese waltz	Samba	Paso doble	Salsa	American Smooth	Rumba	Charleston	Argentine tango	Quickstep	Cha-cha-cha	Couple's choice	Paso doble	Showdance	American Smooth
Bobby & Dianne	Foxtrot	Charleston	Samba	Tango	Viennese waltz	Cha-cha-cha	Argentine tango	American Smooth	Jive	Couple's choice	Salsa	Quickstep	Paso doble	Samba	Showdance	Couple's choice
Layton & Nikita	Samba	Quickstep	Viennese waltz	Cha-cha-cha	Salsa	Tango	Jive	Argentine tango	Couple's choice	American Smooth	Paso doble	Rumba	Charleston	Quickstep	Showdance	Argentine tango
Annabel & Johannes	Cha-cha-cha	Quickstep	Waltz	Jive	Charleston	Tango	Couple's choice	Samba	American Smooth	Paso doble	Foxtrot	Salsa	Viennese waltz			
Nigel & Katya	Paso doble	Viennese waltz	Jive	Salsa	Foxtrot	Cha-cha-cha	Tango	Couple's choice	Quickstep	Rumba						
Angela S. & Carlos	Tango	Jive	Charleston	Viennese waltz	American Smooth	Paso doble	Samba	Waltz	Argentine tango	Cha-cha-cha						
Angela R. & Kai	Cha-cha-cha	Foxtrot	Quickstep	Rumba	Argentine tango	Charleston	Waltz	Paso doble	American Smooth							
Krishnan & Lauren	Cha-cha-cha	Foxtrot	Charleston	Paso doble	Quickstep	Viennese waltz	Couple's choice	Samba								
Adam & Luba	Cha-cha-cha	Tango	Jive	Waltz	Couple's choice	American Smooth	Rumba									
Zara & Graziano	Cha-cha-cha	Quickstep	Paso doble	Viennese waltz	American Smooth	Charleston										
Amanda & Giovanni	Viennese waltz	Salsa	Rumba	Foxtrot												
Eddie & Karen	Quickstep	Cha-cha-cha	Couple's choice	American Smooth	Samba											
Jody & Jowita	Quickstep	Paso doble	American Smooth	Salsa												
Nikita & Gorka	Waltz	Charleston	Jive													
Les & Nancy	Tango	Samba														

== Ratings ==
Weekly ratings for each show on BBC One. All ratings are provided by BARB.

Episode	Date	Official rating (millions)	Weekly rank for BBC One	Weekly rank for all UK TV
Launch show	16 September	7.92	1	1
Week 1	23 September	8.44	1	1
Week 2	30 September	8.37	1	1
Week 2 results	1 October	7.36	2	3
Week 3	7 October	8.40	1	1
Week 3 results	8 October	7.33	2	3
Week 4	14 October	8.41	1	1
Week 4 results	15 October	8.05	2	2
Week 5	21 October	8.79	1	1
Week 5 results	22 October	8.36	2	2
Week 6	28 October	9.20	1	1
Week 6 results	29 October	8.58	2	2
Week 7	4 November	8.81	1	1
Week 7 results	5 November	8.01	2	2
Week 8	11 November	8.80	1	1
Week 8 results	12 November	8.44	2	2
Week 9	18 November	9.78	1	2
Week 9 results	19 November	8.67	2	3
Week 10	25 November	9.07	1	5
Week 10 results	26 November	8.79	2	6
Week 11	2 December	9.37	1	1
Week 11 results	3 December	6.71	3	11
Week 12	9 December	8.88	1	1
Week 12 results	10 December	8.45	2	2
Week 13	16 December	10.06	1	1
Series average (excl. launch show)	2023	8.55	—N/a	—N/a
