= Gordon Smart =

Scottish journalist

Gordon Smart is a Scottish broadcaster and journalist. He was the editor of the Scottish Sun, during the 2014, Scottish referendum and the staging of the Glasgow, 2014 Commonwealth Games. He currently presents across BBC Radio 5 Live, and is an occasional co-host of Morning Live on BBC One. He was previously employed as a presenter over a period of four years, with independent broadcaster, Radio X, including shifts on their Evening Show format where he interviewed high profile celebrities including comedian Russell Brand.

== Journalism career ==
Smart was born in Edinburgh and raised in Kinross. His career in journalism started at DC Thomson in Dundee as a junior reporter on the Evening Telegraph and Dundee Courier in June 1998. He studied journalism at Napier University in Edinburgh.

Unable to find work in newspapers, Smart worked as a football coach for Dutch company Coerver between 2001 and 2002. After two football injuries he returned to Scotland to work for Deadline Press and Picture Agency, covering news in the east of Scotland. When the MTV Europe Music Awards were held in Edinburgh in 2003, Smart was introduced to Victoria Newton, then editor of the Bizarre showbiz column of The Sun newspaper who gave him shifts for the Sun in London, leading to a three-month contract with the News of the World.

Smart joined Bizarre at The Sun in 2004 as Victoria Newton's deputy; then became column editor when she was promoted to head of entertainment in November 2007. His column comprised a 'cabinet' of Pete Samson ("Office of the minister of music"), Danielle Lawler and other deputies. Lawler left to join The Daily Mirror as a 3am Girl soon after, while Samson now holds the US Editor position at The Sun.

In 2013, he was one of the witnesses to the helicopter crash at the Clutha pub in Glasgow which killed ten people.

Smart became a deputy editor of The Sun in London in May 2016 but left the paper altogether in November 2016 to focus on business and broadcasting interests.

== Radio ==
Smart hosted a show on Global Radio's XFM between 2011 and 2013, returning to the station, rebranded in 2015 as Radio X, in April 2016 to host a Sunday show. In January 2017 he became the host of the weekday evening show .

In March 2020, Smart left Radio X due to ill health and in September 2020, it was confirmed that he would not be returning.

In 2024 Smart replaced Colin Murray as host of the Monday to Thursday editions of BBC Radio 5 Live's late show, presiding over a drop in audience.

== Other media work ==
Smart once appeared on The Xtra Factor as a part of the celebrity panel. In May 2010 he appeared on Channel 4's Real Stories discussing the careers of music stars including Cheryl, Rihanna and Simon Cowell with host Dave Berry.

He presented a TalkSPORT 4pm to 7pm Drivetime slot and was a cover presenter on Good Morning Britain in December 2022.

As of August 2022, actor Martin Compston has starred in a Restless Natives weekly podcast with Smart as co-host via Global Player.

Since 26th June 2023 he has been an occasional guest presenter on the BBC daytime show, Morning Live.

== Personal life ==
Smart is married to Kate and they have two children, he is a fundraiser for the Mary Leishman Foundation, in memory of his late mother in law.
