= Morning Live =

British magazine television

- Presented by: Predominant: Michelle Ackerley; Gethin Jones; Helen Skelton; Relief: Sara Cox; Kym Marsh; Gaby Roslin; Kimberley Walsh; Rav Wilding
- Country of origin: United Kingdom
- Original language: English
- No. of series: 8
- No. of episodes: 1,178 (up to and including 23 October 2026)

Production
- Executive producer: Emma Morris
- Production locations: Broadcasting House (2020–2022); Versa Studios (2022–)
- Running time: 45 minutes (2020–2023); 75 minutes (2024–present)
- Production company: BBC Studios

Original release
- Network: BBC One
- Release: 26 October 2020 – present

Morning Live is a magazine programme that airs on weekday mornings between 9:30 am and 10:45 am on BBC One.

== History ==
Morning Live first broadcast on 26 October 2020 as a 40-part series, presented by Kym Marsh and Gethin Jones, to connect with viewers' real-life concerns and to offer trustworthy and expert advice.

The programme returned for a second series in January 2021, following the launch series, which averaged 1,400,000 viewers. One episode in February 2021, achieved 1,800,000 viewers.

In February 2022, Morning Live moved to a new studio "in the heart of Manchester city centre." It was also announced that Sam Quek, Kimberly Walsh and Sara Cox would be joining the permanent presenting line-up alongside Marsh, Jones and Rav Wilding.

Upon its move to Manchester, Morning Live was averaging 1,200,000 viewers, and was consistently achieving slot-winning figures.

In November 2023, Morning Live won the Best Factual Series at the Royal Television Society's North West Awards.

In December 2023, it was announced that Morning Live would extend its running time from 45 minutes to 75 minutes, beginning in the New Year. Its new slot was announced as 9:30 to 10:45. A new presenting line-up was also announced, with Helen Skelton and Michelle Ackerley joining Jones as part of the permanent presenting line-up. It was also announced that Marsh would continue to host on Thursdays and that guest presenters, including Cox, Walsh, Gaby Roslin and Wilding, would also host regularly.

In November 2024, Morning Live won a further three Royal Television Society North West Awards. These were for Best Factual Series, for Best Inclusive Practice, and for Gethin Jones as Best Presenter.

== Series overview ==
This overview only includes the main show, but not the Top Tips and Best Bits spin-off.

Series
Series	Episodes	Originally released	
Series	Episodes	First released	Last released
1	39	26 October 2020	18 December 2020
2	70	25 January 2021	30 April 2021
3	179	24 May 2021	1 April 2022
4	196	4 April 2022	31 March 2023
5	198	3 April 2023	15 March 2024
6	196	8 April 2024	31 March 2025
7	197	1 April 2025	27 March 2026
8	TBA	13 April 2026	TBA

== Cast ==
=== Presenters ===
==== Predominant ====
- Michelle Ackerley
- Gethin Jones
- Helen Skelton

==== Relief ====
- Sara Cox
- Kym Marsh
- Gaby Roslin
- Kimberley Walsh
- Rav Wilding

==== Occasional ====
- Sara Davies
- Holly Hamilton
- Jacqui Joseph
- Jeanette Kwakye
- Janette Manrara
- Louise Minchin
- Gordon Smart

=== Featured experts ===
- Mavis Ackerley: consumer protection
- Matt Allwright: consumer protection
- Iona Bain: finance
- Yvonne Cobb: food
- Oscar Duke: health
- James Greenwood: veterinary
- Harry Kind: consumer protection
- Nick Knowles: DIY
- Punam Krishan: health
- Mark Lane: gardening
- Louise Minchin: consumer protection
- Denise Nurse: legal
- Wayne Perrey: DIY
- Laura Pomfret: finance
- Gary Rycroft: legal
- Ranj Singh: health
- Colletta Smith: cost of living
- Nick Stapleton: crime and scams
- Xand van Tulleken: health
- Rebecca Wilcox: consumer protection
- Rav Wilding: crime and scams
- Briony May Williams: food
