= Nikita Kanda =

English radio presenter and broadcaster (born 1995)

- Born: 29 July 1995 (age 31); Birmingham, West Midlands, England
- Occupations: Radio presenter; broadcaster
- Employer: BBC
- Television: Zee TV; Take Me Out; The One Show; Strictly Come Dancing

Nikita Kanda (born 29 July 1995) is a British radio presenter and broadcaster. She is best known for presenting the BBC Asian Network's breakfast show since July 2022. In 2023, she competed in the twenty-first series of Strictly Come Dancing.

== Life and career ==
Nikita Kanda was born on 29 July 1995 in Birmingham, West Midlands. She is of Indian descent. She studied film and screen media at university, and after graduating, worked on Zee TV and presented the drivetime show on Asian Star 101.6FM. She took part in West End theatre productions including The Wiz, Bugsy Malone, Annie and Pocahontas. Kanda also appeared as one of the thirty women on the final series of the ITV dating show Take Me Out in 2019.

In March 2021, Kanda joined the BBC Asian Network, serving primarily as a regular relief presenter and hosted on Saturday afternoons. In July 2022, she began temporarily presenting the Asian Network Breakfast Show, and was subsequently appointed as the permanent host in January 2023. For her work on the station, she was nominated for Presenter of the Year at the Asian Media Awards. Kanda is also a frequent reporter on The One Show, and has fronted a range of topics including the rise of cashless businesses and government support for female sport.

In August 2023, it was announced that Kanda would be a contestant on the twenty-first series of Strictly Come Dancing. Kanda described her participation as a "dream come true" and said she was "still pinching [herself]", adding that she "[didn't] think it [would] properly sink in until [she stepped] onto the dancefloor". She was the second celebrity to be eliminated.
