= Oli White =

English YouTuber (born 1995)

- Born: Oliver Alan White; 26 January 1995 (age 31); Iver, Buckinghamshire, England
- Occupations: YouTuber; actor; author

YouTube information
- Channel: OliWhite
- Years active: 2012–2020
- Genres: Comedy; vlog; gaming
- Subscribers: 2.55 million (main); 1.03 million (vlogs); 447 thousand (games)
- Views: 477 million (main); 176 million (vlogs); 62 million (games)
- Last updated: 23 September 2025

Oliver Alan White (born 26 January 1995) is an English YouTuber. In August 2012, he began posting videos on the YouTube channel Oli White. In 2014, he performed the role of James in the AwesomenessTV web series production of Shipping Julia. In November 2015, he acted in Joe and Caspar Hit The Road with Joe Sugg and Caspar Lee. In May 2016, he released his first book, Generation Next and his second book, Generation Next: The Takeover was released in 2017.

== Career ==
White created his Oli White channel (originally named OliWhiteTV) in August 2012 and was able to reach 1 million subscribers three years later. In April 2021, he had over 2.7 million subscribers and over 469 million views. His videos consist of challenges, mostly food challenges, featuring his brother James, as well as various other YouTubers.

In 2014, White starred in AwesomenessTV's web series Shipping Julia, playing the role of James, a veteran cruiser who develops a romantic relationship with Julia. In 2015, White hosted the CBBC 8-episode television series Cinemaniacs. Later that year, he hosted Disney XD UK's Mega Awesome Super Hacks, alongside Jimmy Hill and Mawaan Rizwan, and appeared as himself in the British documentary film Joe and Caspar Hit the Road. White a short-lived McDonald’s YouTube channel, targeted at young audience and operated between 2015 and 2016.

In 2016, he starred as The Big Game Hunter in the first season of American murder-mystery web series Escape the Night, hosted by Joey Graceffa, and returned briefly in the second season's pilot episode. White has written two books, Generation Next, released in May 2016 and a sequel, Generation Next: The Takeover, released in 2017.

White launched a CBD brand, Unique CBD, in August 2020.

== Personal life ==
White was born in Iver, England. He attended Pirton School.

== Filmography ==
=== Film ===
| Year | Title | Role | Notes | Ref. |
|---|---|---|---|---|
| 2015 | Joe and Caspar Hit the Road | Himself | Documentary film | |

=== Television ===
| Year | Title | Role | Network | Notes | Ref. |
|---|---|---|---|---|---|
| 2015 | Cinemaniacs | Himself | CBBC | Host; 8 episodes | |
| 2015 | Mega Awesome Super Hacks | Himself | Disney XD UK | Co-host | |

=== Web ===
| Year | Title | Role | Notes | Ref. |
|---|---|---|---|---|
| 2014 | Shipping Julia | James | Main role; 6 episodes | |
| 2016–17 | Escape the Night | The Big Game Hunter | Main role (season 1); Cameo (Season 2); 11 episodes | |

== Awards and nominations ==
| Year | Award | Category | Recipient(s) | Result | Ref. |
|---|---|---|---|---|---|
| 2016 | Streamy Awards | Best Ensemble Cast | Escape the Night (shared with cast) | Won | |
| 2018 | Global Awards | Social Media Superstar | Himself | Nominated | |
