= Strictly Come Dancing Live! =

UK Arena tour

- Tour by BBC Studios
- Location: United Kingdom
- Start date: January each year
- End date: February each year
- Duration: 150 minutes
- No. of shows: 30 (2024–present)
- Producers: Stage Entertainment UK; Phil McIntyre Entertainments; Craig Revel Horwood
- Website: strictlycomedancinglive.com

Strictly Come Dancing Live! (also known as Strictly Come Dancing: The Live Tour!) is a nationwide arena tour in the United Kingdom which was first staged in 2008 and has continued every year since. It is directed and co-choreographed by Strictly Come Dancing judge Craig Revel Horwood.

== Main tour ==
=== Presenters ===
Year(s)	Presenter
2008–10, 2012–13	Kate Thornton
2010	Amanda Byram
2011, 2015	Zoë Ball
2014	Lisa Riley
2016	Mel Giedroyc
2017	Anita Rani
2018–19	Ore Oduba
2020	Stacey Dooley
2022–present	Janette Manrara

=== Judging panel ===
Year(s)	Judge
2008–present	Craig Revel Horwood
2008–2010	Arlene Phillips
2008–2017	Len Goodman
2009–2014, 2016, 2018–2022	Bruno Tonioli
2015	Tom Chambers
2015	Camilla Dallerup
2015, 2023–present	Anton du Beke
2017	Karen Hardy
2018–2019	Darcey Bussell
2019–present	Shirley Ballas
2025	Motsi Mabuse

=== The Live Tour! 2008 ===
Strictly Come Dancing went on tour at the beginning of 2008 for the first time. The tour was hosted by Kate Thornton, and judged by Craig Revel Horwood, Arlene Phillips, and Len Goodman. Bruno Tonioli was not a judge in this competition due to him being in Los Angeles. The tour began on 18 January 2008 in Glasgow and finished on 19 February 2008 in Birmingham.

Celebrity dancers taking part were:

- Series 1 runner-up Christopher Parker and Nicole Cutler – Tango & Paso Doble
- Series 2 runner-up Denise Lewis and Matthew Cutler – Quickstep & Rumba
- Series 3 winner Darren Gough and Lilia Kopylova – Foxtrot & Paso Doble
- Series 3 contestant James Martin/Series 1 contestant Martin Offiah and Camilla Dallerup – Waltz & Cha Cha Cha
- Series 5 contestant Letitia Dean and Darren Bennett – Foxtrot & Jive
- Series 4 contestant Louisa Lytton and Vincent Simone – Argentine Tango & Jive
- Series 5 runner-up Matt Di Angelo and Flavia Cacace – American Smooth & Salsa
- Series 3 finalist Zoë Ball and Ian Waite – Tango & Samba

Christopher Parker's original partner Hanna Karttunen did not dance with him as she had left the show before this tour. Denise Lewis also had a different partner as her original partner Ian Waite danced with more recent partner Zoë Ball, instead, she danced with Matthew Cutler. Also, when James Martin was unavailable for some dates, Martin Offiah stepped in to partner Camilla Dallerup.

Strictly professionals James Jordan and Ola Jordan also performed a routine together.

The results of the tour are as follows:

Couple	Series	Number of wins	Number of 2nd places	%Wins
Matt Di Angelo and Flavia Cacace	5	13	10	40%
Louisa Lytton and Vincent Simone	4	10	3	25%
Darren Gough and Lilia Kopylova	3	8	10	20%
Zoë Ball and Ian Waite	3	5	14	12.5%
Letitia Dean and Darren Bennett	5	1	2	2.5%

Denise Lewis, Christopher Parker or James Martin were not winners or runners up at any stage of the tour.

=== The Live Tour! 2009 ===
The Strictly Come Dancing Tour returned in January and February 2009. Kate Thornton returned to host, and all four judges from the TV series took part.

Celebrity dancers taking part were:

- Series 6 contestant Cherie Lunghi and James Jordan – American Smooth & Rumba
- Series 5 semi-finalist Gethin Jones and Flavia Cacace – Waltz & Salsa
- Series 2 winner Jill Halfpenny and Darren Bennett – Foxtrot & Jive
- Series 6 contestant Jodie Kidd and Ian Waite – American Smooth & Jive
- Series 2 finalist Julian Clary and Lilia Kopylova – Quickstep & Samba
- Series 5 contestant Kenny Logan and Ola Jordan – Viennese Waltz & Paso Doble
- Series 6 runner-up Rachel Stevens and Vincent Simone – Tango & Rumba
- Series 6 winner Tom Chambers and Camilla Dallerup – Quickstep & Samba

The couples and results of the tour were as follows:

Couple	Series	Number of wins	Number of 2nd places	%Wins
Rachel Stevens and Vincent Simone	6	26	14	78%
Gethin Jones and Flavia Cacace	5	6	6	13%
Kenny Logan and Ola Jordan	5	6	0	13%
Julian Clary and Lilia Kopylova	2	3	13	7%
Jill Halfpenny and Darren Bennett	2	3	9	7%
Tom Chambers and Camilla Dallerup	6	1	2	2%
Cherie Lunghi and James Jordan	6	0	1	0%

Gethin Jones and Julian Clary were paired with new professional partners – Jones' partner Camilla Dallerup danced with her series six celebrity Tom Chambers, whilst Clary's partner (Erin Boag) did not take part in the tour, as she and her professional partner Anton du Beke were on their own Cheek To Cheek tour of the UK.

Strictly Come Dancing professionals Matthew Cutler and Kristina Rihanoff also performed a routine together.

The DVD was released on 9 November 2009.

=== The Live Tour! 2010 ===
The Strictly Come Dancing Live Tour took place in January and February 2010. Amanda Byram and Kate Thornton hosted on different nights.

The judging panel consisted of four members:

- Craig Revel Horwood
- Len Goodman (did not appear at every performance)
- Arlene Phillips (did not appear at every performance)
- Bruno Tonioli

The following celebrities and professional dancers starred in the tour:

- Series 7 semi-finalist Ali Bastian and Brian Fortuna – Viennese Waltz & Samba
- Series 5 contestant Kelly Brook and Matthew Cutler – Jive & American Smooth
- Series 7 winner Chris Hollins and Ola Jordan – Rumba & Foxtrot
- Series 4 winner Mark Ramprakash and Kristina Rihanoff – Argentine Tango & Salsa
- Series 7 contestant Ricky Groves and Aliona Vilani – American Smooth & Paso Doble
- Series 7 contestant Natalie Cassidy and Darren Bennett – Quickstep & Cha Cha Cha
- Series 7 contestant Zöe Lucker and James Jordan – Waltz & Rumba
- Series 6 contestant Austin Healey and Lilia Kopylova – Jive & Tango

Two other pro dancers danced on the tour:

- Ian Waite and Natalie Lowe

Couple	Series	Number of wins	%Wins
Austin Healey and Lilia Kopylova	6	23	52%
Mark Ramprakash and Kristina Rihanoff	4	20	44%
Ali Bastian and Brian Fortuna	7	2	4%

=== The Live Tour! 2011 ===
The Strictly Come Dancing 2011 UK tour returned to UK arenas during January and February 2011. Zoë Ball joined as host, and Craig Revel Horwood, Bruno Tonioli and Len Goodman returned as judges. Fever Dance Company Adult Formation team trained by Rachael Holland also performed alongside the Strictly stars. The celebrities and professionals who participated were:

- Series 7 runner-up Ricky Whittle and Natalie Lowe – Argentine Tango & Quickstep
- Series 8 contestant Tina O'Brien and Jared Murillo – Charleston & Foxtrot
- Series 8 finalist Pamela Stephenson and James Jordan – Argentine Tango & Viennese Waltz
- Series 8 winner Kara Tointon and Artem Chigvintsev – Paso Doble & American Smooth
- Series 3 runner-up Colin Jackson and Ola Jordan – Quickstep & Cha Cha Cha
- Series 8 contestant Patsy Kensit and Robin Windsor – Viennese Waltz & Salsa
- Series 8 contestant Jimi Mistry and Kristina Rihanoff – Paso Doble & Foxtrot
- Series 8 runner-up Matt Baker and Aliona Vilani – Tango & Samba
- Series 8 quarter-finalist Ann Widdecombe and Craig Revel Horwood – Charleston

Couple	Series	Number of wins	Number of 2nd places	%Wins
Matt Baker and Aliona Vilani	8	26	8	74%
Pamela Stephenson and James Jordan	8	8	11	23%
Kara Tointon and Artem Chigvintsev	8	1	16	3%

=== The Live Tour! 2012 ===
The Strictly Come Dancing 2012 UK tour began its run on 20 January and finished on 26 February. The venues hosting the tour were:

- National Indoor Arena, Birmingham
- Capital FM Arena, Nottingham
- Wembley Arena and O2 Arena, London
- Evening News Arena, Manchester
- Sheffield Arena, Sheffield
- Echo Arena, Liverpool
- Metro Radio Arena, Newcastle
- SECC, Glasgow
- Cardiff International Arena, Cardiff
- The O2, Dublin
- Odyssey Arena, Belfast

Kate Thornton returned as host. Craig Revel Horwood, Bruno Tonioli and Len Goodman returned as judges. Revel Horwood directed the tour for the second year.

The celebrities and professionals who participated were:

- Series 9 contestant Anita Dobson and Robin Windsor – Charleston & Salsa
- Series 9 runner-up Chelsee Healey and Pasha Kovalev – Showdance & Quickstep
- Series 9 winner Harry Judd and Aliona Vilani – Argentine Tango & Quickstep
- Series 9 finalist Jason Donovan and Kristina Rihanoff – Jive & Argentine Tango
- Series 6 contestant Mark Foster and Natalie Lowe – Waltz & Cha Cha Cha
- Series 9 contestant Nancy Dell'Olio and Artem Chigvintsev – Salsa & Tango
- Series 9 quarter-finalist Robbie Savage and Katya Virshilas – Paso Doble & Salsa

Ian Waite performed with Natalie on the tour, but did not partner a celebrity.

Couple	Series	Number of wins	Times as runner-up	%wins
Harry Judd and Aliona Vilani	9	30	11	73%
Robbie Savage and Katya Virshilas	9	6	1	15%
Chelsee Healey and Pasha Kovalev	9	3	15	7%
Jason Donovan and Kristina Rihanoff	9	2	13	5%
Anita Dobson and Robin Windsor	9	0	1	0%

=== The Live Tour! 2013 ===
The Strictly Come Dancing 2013 UK tour began its run on 18 January 2013. The confirmed line-up of celebrities and professionals for the tour is as follows:

- Series 10 finalist Dani Harmer and Pasha Kovalev – Tango & Charleston/Quickstep Fusion
- Series 10 runner-up Denise van Outen and James Jordan – Jive & Charleston
- Series 10 contestant Fern Britton and Artem Chigvintsev – Viennese Waltz & Salsa
- Series 10 semi-finalist Lisa Riley and Robin Windsor – Cha Cha Cha & Foxtrot
- Series 10 winner Louis Smith and Ola Jordan – Tango/Rumba Fusion & Salsa
- Series 10 contestant Michael Vaughan and Natalie Lowe – Samba & American Smooth
- Series 7 contestant Phil Tufnell and Karen Hauer – Salsa & American Smooth

Kate Thornton returned as host; Craig Revel Horwood, Bruno Tonioli and Len Goodman returned as judges. Iveta Lukosiute also performed on the tour, but did not partner a celebrity. Louis Smith and Ola Jordan were the overall champions of the tour, with the most wins.

Couples	Series	Number of wins	Number of 2nd places	%Wins
Louis Smith and Ola Jordan	10	29	2	94%
Denise van Outen and James Jordan	10	1	26	3%
Lisa Riley and Robin Windsor	10	1	0	3%
Dani Harmer and Pasha Kovalev	10	0	3	0%

=== The Live Tour! 2014 ===
The Strictly Come Dancing 2014 UK Tour begun on 17 January 2014 at the National Indoor Arena in Birmingham and ended at The O2 Arena on 7 February. The tour was hosted by former contestant Lisa Riley, and Bruno Tonioli, Craig Revel Horwood and Len Goodman returned as judges.

The following celebrities and professionals took part:

- Series 11 contestant Mark Benton and Iveta Lukosiute – Salsa & Cha Cha Cha
- Series 11 contestant Ben Cohen and Kristina Rihanoff – Waltz & Salsa
- Series 11 runner-up Susanna Reid and Kevin Clifton – Foxtrot & Paso Doble
- Series 11 runner-up Natalie Gumede and Artem Chigvintsev – Viennese Waltz & Jive
- Series 11 winner Abbey Clancy and Aljaž Škorjanec – Quickstep & Salsa
- Series 11 contestant Deborah Meaden and Robin Windsor – Quickstep & Cha Cha Cha
- Series 10 quarter-finalist Nicky Byrne and Karen Hauer – Argentine Tango & Charleston

Natalie Lowe also featured on the tour, but did not partner a celebrity.

This is the first series of The Live Tour! in which all of the celebrities danced with their original partners.

Couple	Series	Number of wins	%Wins
Natalie Gumede and Artem Chigvintsev	11	19	61%
Susanna Reid and Kevin Clifton	11	6	19%
Abbey Clancy and Aljaž Skorjanec	11	2	6%
Ben Cohen and Kristina Rihanoff	11	1	3%
Deborah Meaden and Robin Windsor	11	1	3%
Mark Benton and Iveta Lukosiute	11	1	3%
Nicky Byrne and Karen Hauer	10	1	3%

=== The Live Tour! 2015 ===
The Strictly Come Dancing 2015 UK Tour began on 16 January 2015 at the National Indoor Arena in Birmingham and concluded at The O2 Arena on 8 February 2015. The tour was hosted by former contestant and It Takes Two host Zoë Ball for the second time. Craig Revel Horwood returned as judge, but Len Goodman and Bruno Tonioli did not take part due to other commitments including Dancing with the Stars in the United States, so they were replaced by Series 6 champion Tom Chambers and his professional partner Camilla Dallerup. Anton du Beke was also a judge in the Echo Arena, Liverpool and Wembley Arena, London. Len Goodman was a judge just for the O2 show on 8 February and on that same show the presenter was Lisa Riley.

The following celebrities and professionals took part:

- Series 12 contestant Thom Evans and Iveta Lukosiute – Charleston & Salsa
- Series 12 winner Caroline Flack and Tristan MacManus – American Smooth & Charleston
- Series 12 contestant Alison Hammond and Aljaž Skorjanec – Charleston & Cha Cha Cha
- Series 12 contestant Scott Mills and Joanne Clifton – Foxtrot & Samba
- Series 12 runner-up Simon Webbe and Kristina Rihanoff – Salsa & Argentine Tango
- Series 12 finalist Mark Wright and Karen Hauer – Cha Cha Cha & Foxtrot
- Series 6 runner-up Rachel Stevens and Kevin Clifton – Tango & Rumba^{A}

Trent Whiddon also featured on the tour to dance with Iveta, but did not partner a celebrity.

Simon Webbe and Kristina Rihanoff were the overall champions of the tour, with the most wins.

Pro partners on the tour were as follows:

- Kevin Clifton and Karen Clifton
- Tristan MacManus and Kristina Rihanoff
- Aljaz Skorjanec and Joanne Clifton
- Trent Whiddon and Iveta Lukosiute

Couple	Series	Number of wins	Times as runner-up	%Wins
Simon Webbe and Kristina Rihanoff	12	16	1	57%
Caroline Flack and Tristan MacManus	12	5	1	18%
Rachel Stevens and Kevin Clifton	6	3	1	11%
Scott Mills and Joanne Clifton	12	1	1	4%
Mark Wright and Karen Hauer	12	1	0	4%
Alison Hammond and Aljaž Skorjanec	12	1	0	4%
Thom Evans and Iveta Lukosiute	12	1	0	4%

^A Frankie Bridge was originally supposed to take part, but had to pull out due to pregnancy, so Stevens took her place.

=== The Live Tour! 2016 ===
The 2016 tour started on 22 January and finished on 14 February. The new presenter was Mel Giedroyc and the judges were Craig Revel Horwood, Len Goodman and Bruno Tonioli.

- Series 13 contestant Ainsley Harriott and Karen Clifton – Tango & Salsa^{a}
- Series 12 runner-up Frankie Bridge and Kevin Clifton – Quickstep & Tango
- Series 13 runner-up Georgia May Foote and Giovanni Pernice – Charleston & American Smooth
- Series 13 semi-finalist Anita Rani and Gleb Savchenko – Paso Doble & American Smooth^{b}
- Series 13 winner Jay McGuiness and Aliona Vilani – Rumba & Jive
- Series 13 quarter-finalist Helen George and Aljaž Skorjanec – Viennese Waltz & Tango
- Series 12 semi-finalist Jake Wood and Janette Manrara – Salsa & Samba

Joanne Clifton was also featured on the tour, but did not partner a celebrity.

Pro Partners on the tour were as follows:

- Kevin Clifton and Karen Clifton
- Giovanni Pernice and Aliona Vilani
- Aljaz Skorjanec and Janette Manrara
- Gleb Savchenko and Joanne Clifton

Couple	Number of wins	Number of 2nd places	%Wins
Jay McGuiness and Aliona Vilani	24	6	80%
Anita Rani and Gleb Savchenko	6	23	20%
Frankie Bridge and Kevin Clifton	0	1	0%

^{a} Natalie Lowe was scheduled to dance on the tour but she sustained an injury during tour rehearsals. Karen Clifton, who was already set to dance on the tour without a celebrity partner, took over for Lowe.

^{b} Mel Giedroyc was ill on 9 February so Anita Rani hosted instead. However, she still performed her Paso Doble but not for votes.

=== The Live Tour! 2017 ===
The 2017 tour was presented by 2015 semi-finalist Anita Rani. The judges were Craig Revel Horwood, Len Goodman and Karen Hardy. The tour started on 20 January and finished on 12 February.

The full tour line up was announced on 14 December:

- Series 14 runner-up Louise Redknapp and Kevin Clifton – Paso Doble & Quickstep
- Series 14 contestant Daisy Lowe and Aljaž Skorjanec – Salsa & Waltz
- Series 14 runner-up Danny Mac and Oti Mabuse – Charleston & Samba
- Series 14 contestant Ed Balls and Katya Jones – American Smooth & Salsa
- Series 14 winner Ore Oduba and Karen Clifton – Jive & Showdance
- Series 14 contestant Lesley Joseph and Gorka Márquez – Quickstep & Charleston

As Ed Balls was not available to dance in Manchester, Judge Rinder and Oksana Platero replaced him for the 4 and 5 February performances and danced the Jive and the Cha Cha Cha.

Extra Dancers on Tour who were dancing in Group Dances:

- Giovanni Pernice and Janette Manrara
- AJ Pritchard and Chloe Hewitt
- Neil Jones and Oksana Platero

Couple	Number of Wins	Wins%
Danny Mac and Oti Mabuse	14	45%
Louise Redknapp and Kevin Clifton	14	45%
Daisy Lowe and Aljaž Skorjanec	1	5%
Ed Balls and Katya Jones	1	5%

=== The Live Tour! 2018 ===
The 2018 tour was presented by 2016 champion Ore Oduba. The judges were Craig Revel Horwood, Bruno Tonioli and Darcey Bussell. The tour started on 19 January and finished on 11 February.

The full tour line up was announced on 14 December:

- Series 15 runner-up Alexandra Burke and Gorka Márquez – Quickstep & Jive
- Series 15 runner-up Debbie McGee and Giovanni Pernice – Salsa & American Smooth
- Series 15 runner-up Gemma Atkinson and Aljaž Skorjanec – Paso Doble & American Smooth
- Series 15 winner Joe McFadden and Katya Jones – Argentine Tango & Charleston
- Series 15 quarter-finalist Davood Ghadami and Nadiya Bychkova – Charleston & Paso Doble
- Series 15 contestant Susan Calman and Kevin Clifton – Samba & Quickstep
- Series 15 contestant Jonnie Peacock and Oti Mabuse – Jive & American Smooth

Extra dancers who were also on the tour: Dianne Buswell, Amy Dowden, Janette Manrara, AJ Pritchard, Chloe Hewitt and Neil Jones

Couples	Number of Wins	Wins%
Susan Calman & Kevin Clifton	11	37%
Debbie McGee & Giovanni Pernice	9	30%
Gemma Atkinson & Aljaž Skorjanec	5	17%
Joe McFadden & Katya Jones	4	13%
Jonnie Peacock & Oti Mabuse	1	3%

=== The Live Tour! 2019 ===
2016 champion Ore Oduba returned as the host, and Shirley Ballas joined Craig Revel Horwood, Darcey Bussell and Bruno Tonioli on the judging panel. The tour started on 18 January and ended on 10 February.

The line-up for the tour was announced on 10 December:

- Series 16 winner Stacey Dooley and Aljaž Skorjanec – American Smooth & Paso Doble
- Series 16 runner-up Faye Tozer and Giovanni Pernice – Showdance & Charleston
- Series 16 runner-up Joe Sugg and Dianne Buswell – Showdance & Charleston
- Series 16 runner-up Ashley Roberts and Pasha Kovalev – Jive & American Smooth
- Series 16 semi-finalist Lauren Steadman and AJ Pritchard – Jive & Viennese Waltz
- Series 16 contestant Graeme Swann and Karen Clifton – Samba & Jazz
- Series 16 contestant Dr. Ranj Singh and Janette Manrara – Cha Cha Cha & Salsa

Additional professional dancers on the tour were Nadiya Bychkova, Graziano Di Prima, Amy Dowden, Jake Leigh, Luba Mushtuk and Johannes Radebe.

Joe Sugg and Dianne Buswell made Strictly Live Tour history by winning 25 shows in a row, later becoming the overall tour winners.

Couples	Number of wins	Number of 2nd places	Wins%
Joe Sugg & Dianne Buswell	28	1	97%
Stacey Dooley & Aljaž Skorjanec	1	24	3%
Faye Tozer & Giovanni Pernice	0	4	0%

=== The Live Tour! 2020 ===
The 2020 tour was hosted by Series 16 winner Stacey Dooley. Craig Revel Horwood, Shirley Ballas and Bruno Tonioli formed the judging panel. The tour started on 16 January and ended on 9 February.

The tour featured the following couples performing two of their dances from Series 17:

- Series 17 winner Kelvin Fletcher and Janette Manrara – Showdance & Samba
- Series 17 runner-up Emma Barton and Graziano Di Prima – Charleston & American Smooth
- Series 17 runner-up Karim Zeroual and Amy Dowden – Quickstep & Jive
- Series 17 quarter-finalist Alex Scott and Neil Jones – Paso Doble & Street
- Series 17 contestant Saffron Barker and AJ Pritchard – Foxtrot & Waltz
- Series 17 contestant Mike Bushell and Katya Jones – Cha Cha Cha & Quickstep
- Series 17 contestant Catherine Tyldesley and Johannes Radebe – Rumba & Charleston

Due to an injury, Catherine Tyldesley was forced to pull out of the Tour on 30 January.

Additional professional dancers on the tour were Dianne Buswell, Karen Hauer, Luba Mushtuk, Joshua Keefe, Robbie Kmetoni, and Jake Leigh.

Couples	Number of wins	Number of 2nd places	Wins%
Kelvin Fletcher & Janette Manrara	30	0	97%
Mike Bushell & Katya Jones	1	0	3%
Karim Zeroual & Amy Dowden	0	23	0%
Saffron Barker & AJ Pritchard	0	6	0%
Alex Scott & Neil Jones	0	2	0%

==== Relaxed performance ====
On 2 October 2019, it was announced that during one of the shows, Strictly Come Dancing Live would be working with the National Autistic Society on their first ever relaxed performance at Motorpoint Arena in Nottingham, but have not done one since.

=== The Live Tour! 2022 ===
The 2021 tour was cancelled due to the COVID-19 pandemic. The 2022 tour was announced in October 2020, and began on 20 January 2022 in Birmingham for 33 shows with Janette Manrara as host and Craig Revel Horwood, Shirley Ballas and Bruno Tonioli forming the judges panel.

The tour features (in running order):

- Series 19 runner-up John Whaite and Johannes Radebe – Paso Doble & Showdance
- Series 19 contestant Tilly Ramsay and Nikita Kuzmin – Waltz & Couple's Choice
- Series 18 contestant Max George and Katya Jones – Jive & American Smooth
- Series 19 contestant Sara Davies and Aljaž Skorjanec – Foxtrot & Quickstep
- Series 18 runner-up Maisie Smith and Kai Widdrington – Quickstep & Samba
- Series 19 semi-finalist Rhys Stephenson and Nancy Xu – Charleston & Argentine Tango
- Series 19 winner Rose Ayling-Ellis and Giovanni Pernice – Argentine Tango & Couple's Choice

Series 19 finalist AJ Odudu was originally scheduled to take part in the tour, but was forced to pull out due to the ankle injury she suffered on the show; she was replaced by Series 18 runner-up Maisie Smith.

Pro Nikita Kuzmin was forced to miss the beginning of the tour due to testing positive for COVID-19; his partner Tilly Ramsay danced with Neil Jones until Kuzmin returned to the tour on 25 January.

Rhys Stephenson did not dance in Sheffield on 1 February for undisclosed reasons.

John Whaite did not dance in Glasgow on 6 February due to testing positive for COVID-19 on a lateral flow test. A subsequent PCR test came back negative, and he performed in Glasgow the following evening.

Additional professional dancers on the tour are Amy Dowden, Cameron Lombard, Jake Leigh, Jowita Przystal, Luba Mushtuk, Nadiya Bychkova, and Neil Jones.

Couples	Number of wins	Number of 2nd places	Wins%
Rose Ayling-Ellis & Giovanni Pernice	31	2	94%
John Whaite & Johannes Radebe	1	25	3%
Sara Davies & Aljaž Skorjanec	1	2	3%
Maisie Smith & Kai Widdrington	0	4	0%

=== The Live Tour! 2023 ===
The 2023 tour was once again hosted by Janette Manrara. Anton du Beke joined Craig Revel Horwood and Shirley Ballas on the judging panel. The tour began on 20 January and ended on 12 February.

The tour features (in running order):

- Series 20 contestant Tyler West and Dianne Buswell – Charleston & Salsa
- Series 20 runner-up Molly Rainford and Carlos Gu – Quickstep & Paso Doble
- Series 20 semi-finalist Will Mellor and Nancy Xu – Jive & American Smooth
- Series 20 contestant Ellie Simmonds and Nikita Kuzmin – Waltz & Charleston
- Series 20 runner-up Helen Skelton and Kai Widdrington – Quickstep & Couple's Choice
- Series 20 runner-up Fleur East and Vito Coppola – Samba & Couple's Choice
- Series 20 winner Hamza Yassin and Jowita Przystał – American Smooth & Salsa

Fleur East did not dance in Newcastle on 2 February and London on 3 February for undisclosed reasons.

Tyler West did not dance in Glasgow on 10 February due to illness.

Additional professional dancers on the tour were Amy Dowden, Neil Jones, Robbie Kmetoni, Jake Leigh, Luba Mushtuk and Michelle Tsiakkas.

Couples	Number of wins	Number of 2nd places	Wins%
Helen Skelton & Kai Widdrington	13	15	41%
Will Mellor & Nancy Xu	8	7	25%
Hamza Yassin & Jowita Przystał	7	7	22%
Fleur East & Vito Coppola	4	3	13%

=== The Live Tour! 2024 ===
The 2024 tour was again hosted by Janette Manrara, with Craig Revel Horwood, Shirley Ballas and Anton du Beke forming the judging panel. The tour began on 19 January and ended on 11 February.

The tour featured: (in running order)

- Series 21 contestant Krishnan Guru-Murthy and Jowita Przystał – Cha-Cha-Cha and Quickstep
- Series 21 contestant Angela Scanlon and Carlos Gu – Charleston and Argentine Tango
- Series 21 runner-up Layton Williams and Nikita Kuzmin – Quickstep and Paso Doble
- Series 21 contestant Angela Rippon and Kai Widdrington – Argentine Tango and Cha-Cha-Cha
- Series 21 runner-up Bobby Brazier and Dianne Buswell – Samba and Viennese Waltz
- Series 21 semi-finalist Annabel Croft and Graziano Di Prima – American Smooth and Samba
- Series 21 winner Ellie Leach and Vito Coppola – Paso Doble and American Smooth

Angela Rippon did not dance in Leeds on 1 and 2 February due to a medical incident in Liverpool on 31 January.

Additional professional dancers on the tour were Nadiya Bychkova, Karen Hauer, Katya Jones, Neil Jones, Robbie Kmetoni, Jake Leigh and Nancy Xu.

Couples	Number of wins	Number of 2nd places	Wins%
Layton Williams & Nikita Kuzmin	19	8	63%
Bobby Brazier & Dianne Buswell	8	15	27%
Ellie Leach & Vito Coppola	3	7	10%

=== The Live Tour! 2025 ===
The 2025 tour was again hosted by Janette Manrara, while Motsi Mabuse joined Craig Revel Horwood, Shirley Ballas and Anton du Beke on the judging panel. The tour began on 17 January and ended on 9 February.

The tour featured: (in running order)

- Series 22 contestant Shayne Ward and Nancy Xu – Tango & Quickstep
- Series 22 quarter-finalist Montell Douglas and Kai Widdrington – Quickstep & Salsa
- Series 22 contestant Wynne Evans and Katya Jones – Viennese Waltz & Cha-Cha-Cha
- Series 22 contestant Jamie Borthwick and Michelle Tsiakkas – Jive & Paso Doble
- Series 22 runner-up Tasha Ghouri and Aljaž Škorjanec – Showdance & American Smooth
- Series 22 runner-up Sarah Hadland and Nikita Kuzmin – Cha-Cha-Cha & Charleston
- Series 22 runner-up JB Gill and Amy Dowden & Lauren Oakley – Waltz & Samba

Pro Vito Coppola was originally scheduled to dance on the tour, but it was reported on 13 January that he would not be in the initial performances due to back pain. He did perform in Newcastle on 22 January, which was his only appearance during the tour; on 30 January he announced he had withdrawn from the show due to his injury; his celebrity partner Sarah Hadland danced with Nikita Kuzmin for the other tour performances.

Wynne Evans did not dance in Glasgow on 25 January and the matinee show on 26 January due to injury. Sarah Hadland did not dance in the evening show in Glasgow on 26 January for undisclosed reasons.

Wynne Evans left the tour on 28 January following controversy surrounding an "inappropriate and unacceptable" remark made just before the first show in Birmingham.

Additional professional dancers on the tour were Dianne Buswell, Karen Hauer, Neil Jones, Jowita Przystał, Nikita Kuzmin, Robbie Kmetoni and Jake Leigh. Carlos Gu wasn't originally going to be on the tour, but joined the tour as an additional dancer as Kuzmin danced with Sarah Hadland.

Couples	Number of wins	Number of 2nd places	Wins%
Tasha Ghouri and Aljaž Škorjanec	20	9	67%
Sarah Hadland and Nikita Kuzmin	8	13	27%
JB Gill and Amy Dowden & Lauren Oakley	1	8	3%
Jamie Borthwick and Michelle Tsiakkas	1	0	3%

=== The Live Tour! 2026 ===
The 2026 Tour was again hosted by Janette Manrara, with Craig Revel Horwood, Shirley Ballas and Anton du Beke making up the judging panel. The tour began on 23 January and ended on 15 February, consisting of 30 shows.

The tour featured: (in running order)

- Series 23 contestant Harry Aikines-Aryeetey and Karen Hauer – Cha-Cha-Cha & Salsa
- Series 23 contestant Vicky Pattison and Kai Widdrington – Couples Choice & Tango
- Series 23 contestant Ellie Goldstein and Vito Coppola – Salsa & Couples Choice
- Series 23 contestant Jimmy Floyd Hasselbaink and Lauren Oakley – Quickstep & Cha-Cha-Cha
- Series 23 contestant La Voix and Aljaž Škorjanec – Paso Doble & Salsa
- Series 23 quarter-finalist Lewis Cope and Katya Jones – Charleston & Couples Choice
- Series 23 runner-up George Clarke and Alexis Warr – Viennese Waltz & Charleston
- Guest performers: Series 21 runner-up Layton Williams and Nikita Kuzmin – Argentine Tango & Showdance

George Clarke did not dance in Newcastle on 27–28 January, Leeds on 29–30 January, Nottingham on 10 & 12 February and London on 14–15 February, missing 11 shows in total due to prior commitments.

Lewis Cope missed 3 shows and did not dance in Birmingham on 23 January, Leeds on 29 January and Liverpool on 6 February due to prior commitments.

Additional professional dancers on the tour will be Julian Caillon, Neil Jones, Jake Leigh, Luba Mushtuk, Michelle Tsiakkas, and Nancy Xu.

Couples	Number of wins	Number of 2nd places	Wins%
George Clarke & Alexis Warr	15	4	50%
Lewis Cope & Katya Jones	14	13	47%
Vicky Pattison & Kai Widdrington	1	10	3%
La Voix & Aljaž Škorjanec	0	3	0%

== The Professionals Tour ==
=== The Professionals Tour 2010 ===
The first Professionals Tour was in 2010. Nine professional dancers took part in the tour between April and July 2010. It featured:

- Vincent Simone and Flavia Cacace
- Matthew Cutler and Aliona Vilani
- James Jordan and Ola Jordan
- Brian Fortuna and Kristina Rihanoff
- Ian Waite

=== The Professionals Tour 2019 ===
Strictly Come Dancing – The Professionals Tour returned in 2019 and ran between 3 May and 2 June. It featured the following Professionals:

- AJ Pritchard
- Dianne Buswell
- Giovanni Pernice
- Gorka Márquez
- Karen Clifton
- Katya Jones
- Nadiya Bychkova
- Neil Jones
- Oti Mabuse
- Pasha Kovalev

=== The Professionals Tour 2021 (cancelled) ===
It had been announced that The Professionals Tour would return again in 2020 following the success of the 2019 tour. This was later postponed to 2021, and then 2022, as a result of the COVID-19 pandemic. The 2021 tour would have featured the following ten professional dancers:

- Dianne Buswell
- Gorka Márquez
- Janette Manrara
- Johannes Radebe
- Joshua Keefe
- Kai Widdrington
- Karen Hauer
- Katya Jones
- Luba Mushtuk
- Neil Jones

=== The Professionals Tour 2022 ===
The 2022 tour ran between 28 April and 30 May and featured the following ten professional dancers: with singers Tara McDonald and Patrick Symth.

- Arduino Bertoncello
- Dianne Buswell
- Gorka Márquez
- Graziano Di Prima
- Kai Widdrington
- Karen Hauer
- Katya Jones
- Luba Mushtuk
- Nadiya Bychkova
- Neil Jones

=== The Professionals Tour 2023 ===
The 2023 tour ran between 2 May and 31 May and featured the following ten professional dancers and singers Tara McDonald and Patrick Symth :

- Carlos Gu
- Dianne Buswell
- Gorka Márquez
- Jowita Przystał
- Karen Hauer
- Luba Mushtuk
- Nancy Xu
- Neil Jones
- Nikita Kuzmin
- Vito Coppola

=== The Professionals Tour 2024 ===
The 2024 tour ran between 1 May and 1 June and featured twelve professional dancers, the most in the tour's history and singers Tara McDonald and Patrick Smyth.

- Carlos Gu
- Dianne Buswell
- Gorka Márquez
- Graziano Di Prima
- Jowita Przystał
- Karen Hauer
- Luba Mushtuk
- Michelle Tsiakkas
- Nancy Xu
- Neil Jones
- Nikita Kuzmin
- Vito Coppola

=== The Professionals Tour 2026 ===
- Julian Caillon
- Luba Mushtuk
- Gorka Márquez
- Alexis Warr
- Neil Jones
- Nancy Xu
- Lauren Oakley
- Kai Widdrington
- Vito Coppola
- Jowita Przystał

Michelle Tsiakkas was due to take part in this tour but withdrew prior to the start.
