= MVE Management =

British and American talent management company

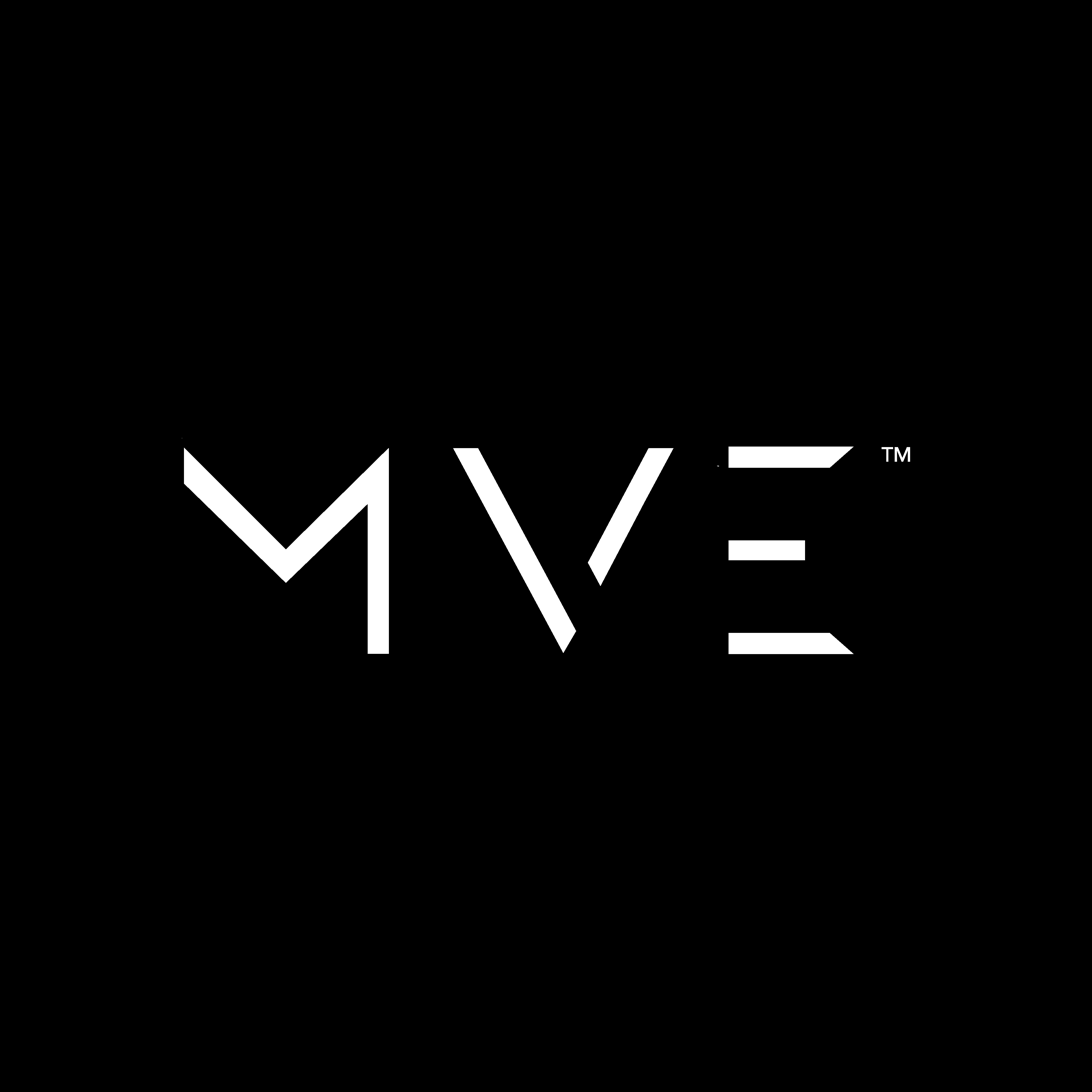
- Industry: Entertainment management
- Founded: 2018; 8 years ago in London, England
- Headquarters: London and Los Angeles
- Key people: Joe Sugg; Caspar Lee
- Website: www.mvemanagement.com

MVE Management (formerly known as Margravine Management) is a talent management company founded in 2018 by Joe Sugg and Caspar Lee in partnership with IMG. The company was originally headquartered in London, England, and expanded to the United States in 2023.

== History ==
MVE is a joint venture with IMG and influencers Joe Sugg and Caspar Lee. It was founded in 2018 under the name Margravine Management, as Sugg and Lee expressed interest in pivoting from content creation to the entertainment business. It was cited to be the first company to offer talent led support in the influencer industry.

In October 2019 they signed the family vlogger and musician LadBaby. In September 2022 Dean Ondrus Coulson and Claudia Parrinello were appointed to oversee US operations before taking a global role from Jan 2023. In 2023, they rebranded as MVE, and opened an office in Los Angeles, California to acquire talent in the United States. In July 2024, Minnie Harding was hired as UK Talent Boss, formerly at Simon Cowell's agency, YMU.

== Roster ==
The current roster of talent at MVE:

- Adam Lind
- Aggie Lal
- Ambar Driscoll
- Amber Dowty
- Andrew Spann
- Anthony Corrado
- Barney Banks
- Brit Harvey
- Bryony Blake
- Caroline Parker
- Caroline Pearce
- Chandler Isaac
- Chloe Hayward
- Clayton Wenner
- Connor and Liana
- Crystal Tan
- Danielle Esther
- Delaney Childs
- Dianne Buswell
- Ellie Evelyn Smith
- Esme Todd
- George Clarke
- Georgia White
- Georgie Eats
- Goes Without Saying
- Goldie Quaker
- Greta Wilson
- Hanna Noelle
- Jayelle Carty
- Jayli
- Jo and Kemp
- John Gregory Smith
- Julianna Astrid
- Kaylie Stewart
- Kyron Hamilton
- Lauren Licup
- Leslie Catherine
- Lillie Grace Prescott
- Lottie Bedlow
- Lucy Flight
- Luiza Cordery
- Mads (Cripandip)
- Mark Ferris
- Mike Okay
- Milly Hobbs
- Nadia Anya
- Natalie Just
- Olivia Kirkby
- Olly Bowman
- Paige Summerton
- Rakeem Omar
- Rhys Stephenson
- Sams Eats
- Savannah Sachdev
- Sepps
- Sian Grant
- Spencer Elmer
- Victoria Glass
