= Strictly Come Dancing series 16 =

Strictly Come Dancing
- Series 16
- Presented by: Tess Daly; Claudia Winkleman
- Judges: Shirley Ballas; Darcey Bussell; Craig Revel Horwood; Bruno Tonioli; Alfonso Ribeiro (guest)
- Celebrity winner: Stacey Dooley
- Professional winner: Kevin Clifton
- No. of episodes: 25

Release
- Original network: BBC One
- Original release: 8 September – 15 December 2018

Series chronology
- ← Previous; Series 15 Next → Series 17

Strictly Come Dancing returned for its sixteenth series with a launch show on 8 September 2018 on BBC One, and the first live show on 22 September. Tess Daly and Claudia Winkleman returned as hosts, while Zoe Ball returned to host Strictly Come Dancing: It Takes Two on BBC Two. Shirley Ballas, Darcey Bussell, Craig Revel Horwood, and Bruno Tonioli returned as judges. On 20 October, actor Alfonso Ribeiro stood in as a guest judge to cover for Tonioli.

In this series, three new dance styles were introduced — contemporary, theatre/jazz, and street/commercial — as part of a new category called "couple's choice".

Stacey Dooley and Kevin Clifton were announced as the winners on 15 December 2018, while Joe Sugg and Dianne Buswell, Faye Tozer and Giovanni Pernice, and Ashley Roberts and Pasha Kovalev were the runners-up.

== Format ==
Hosts and Judges for Strictly Come Dancing Series 16

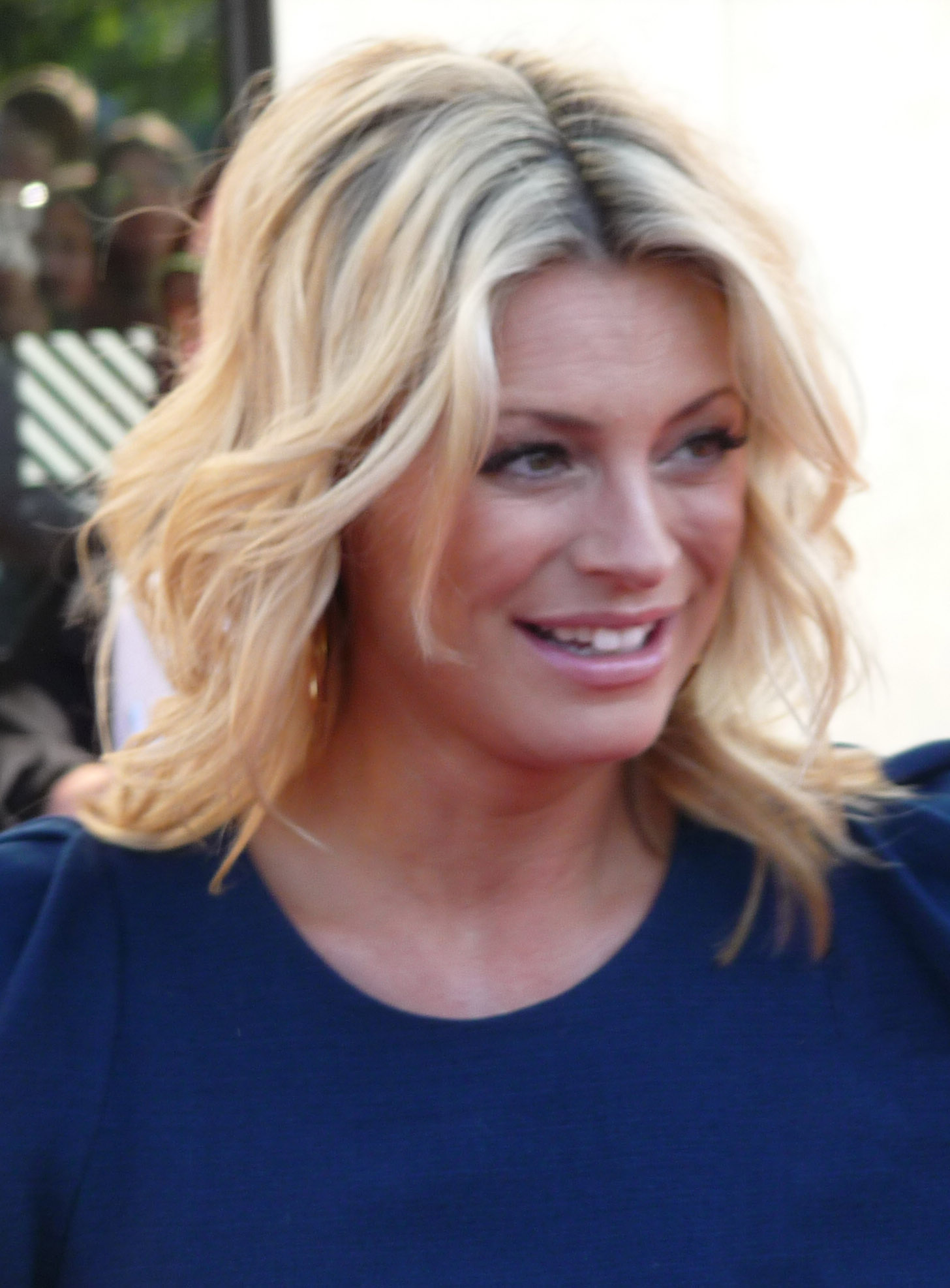
Tess Daly

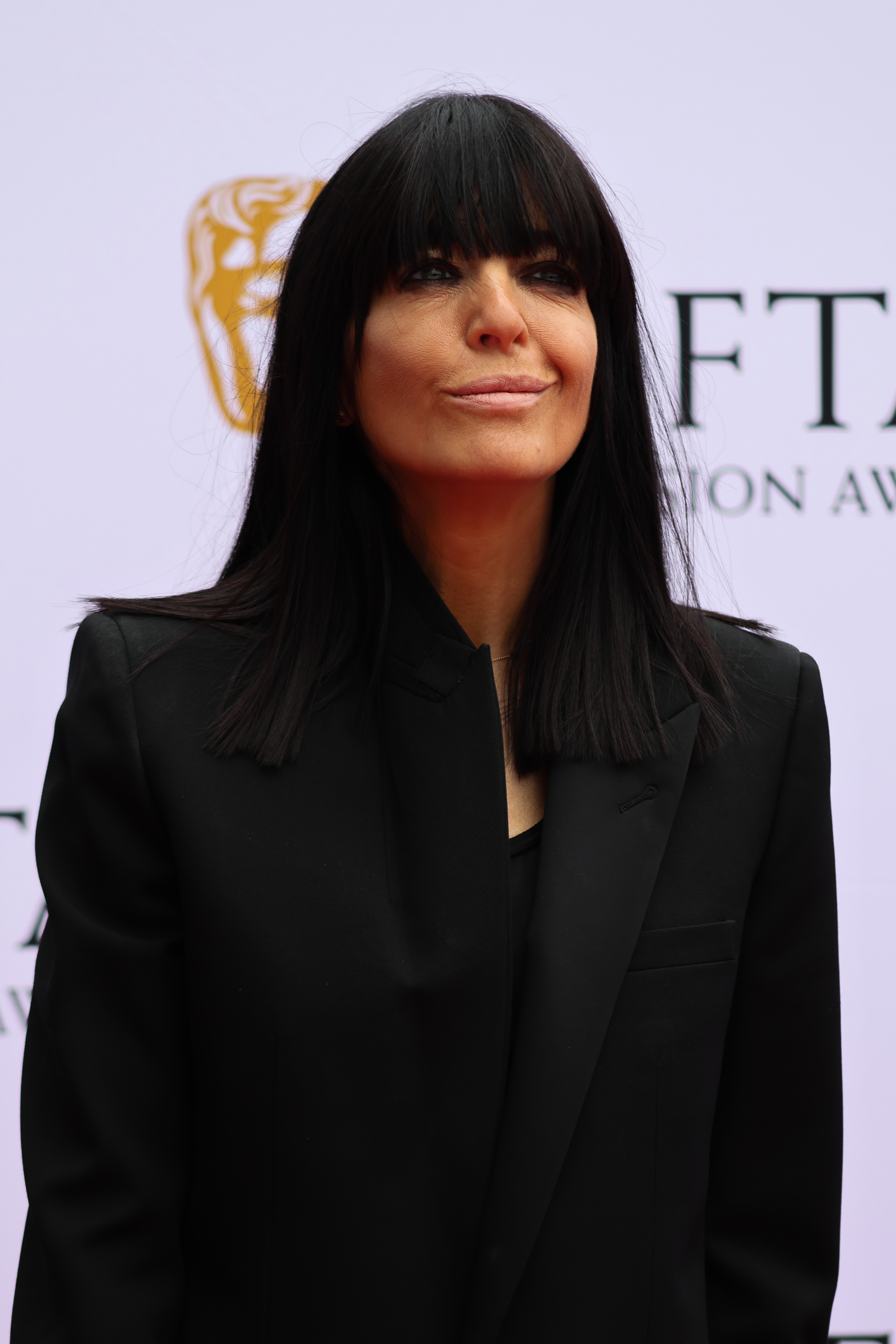
Claudia Winkleman

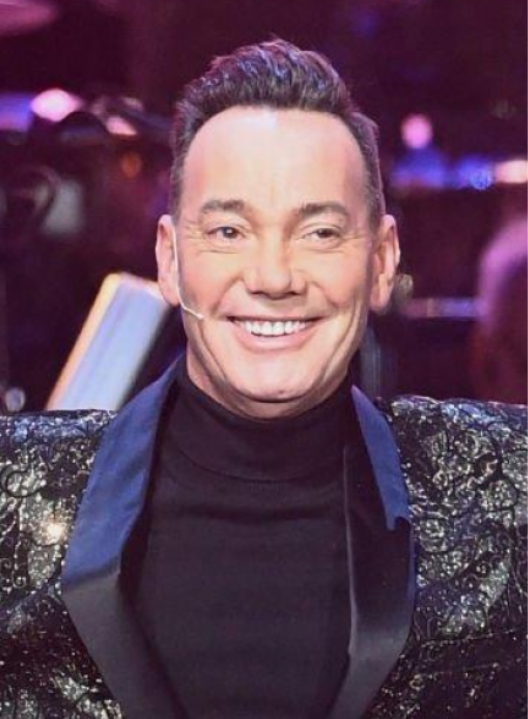
Craig Revel Horwood

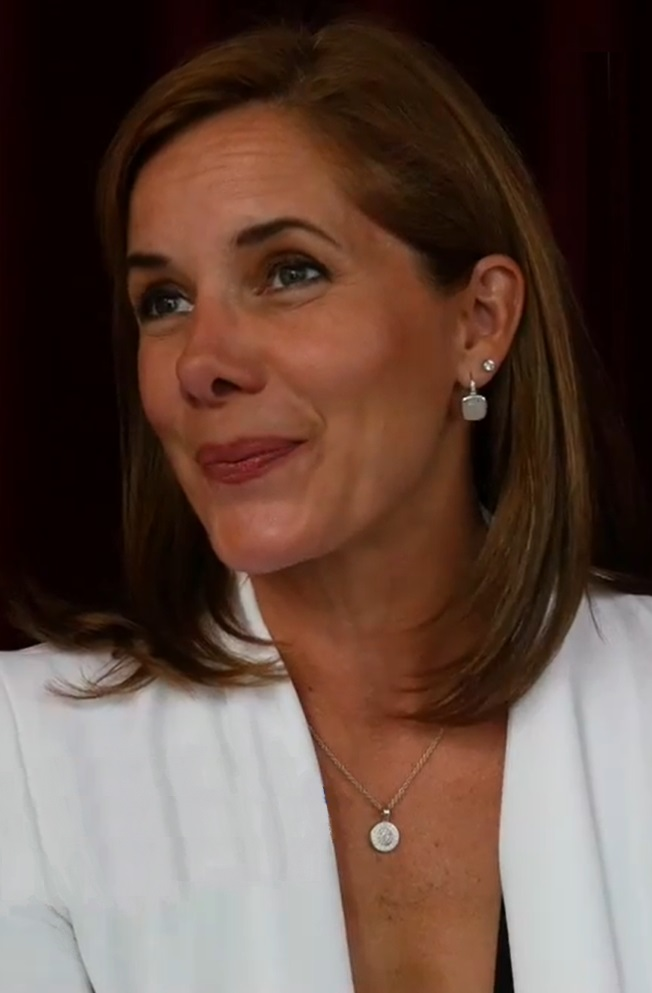
Darcey Bussell

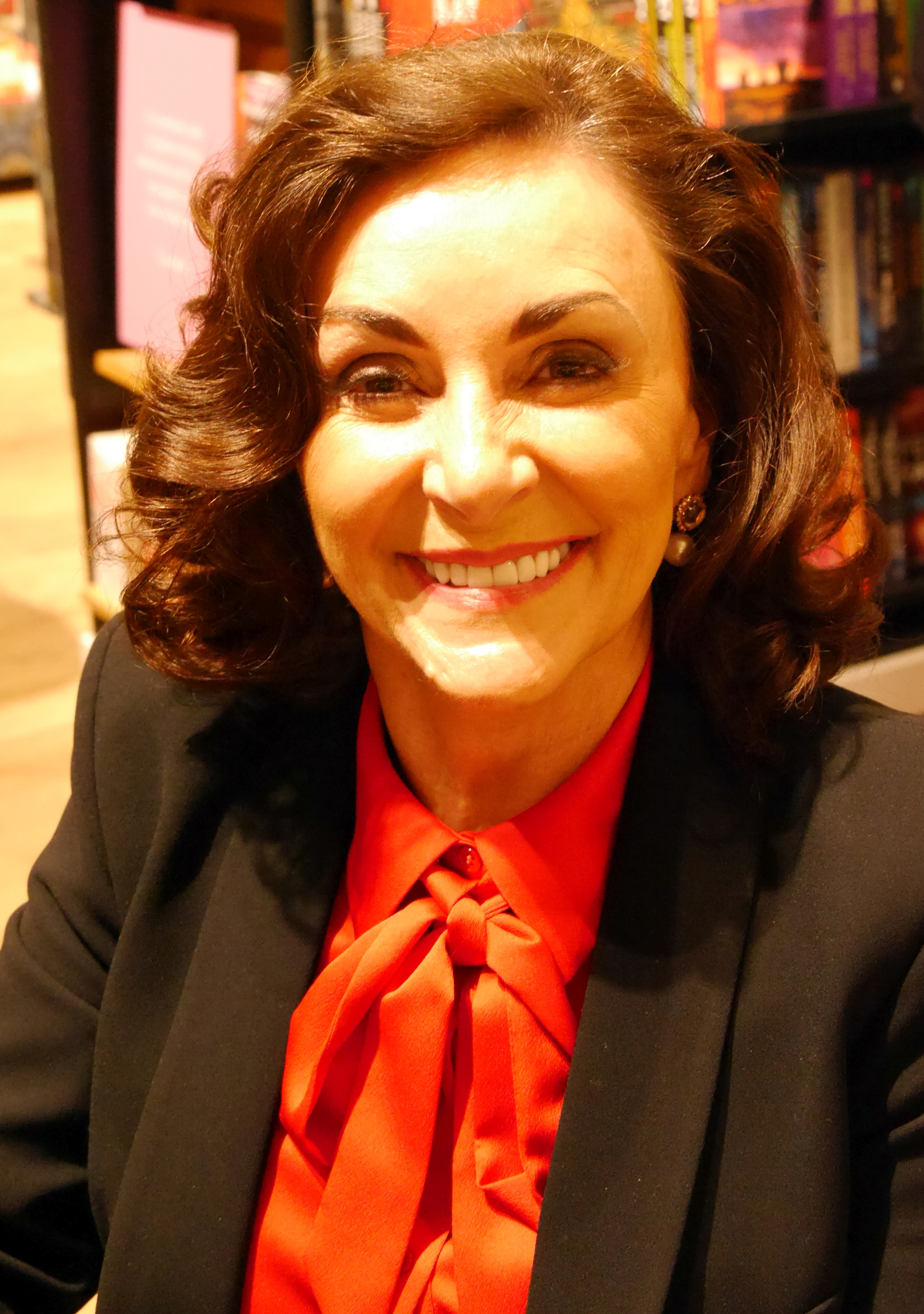
Shirley Ballas

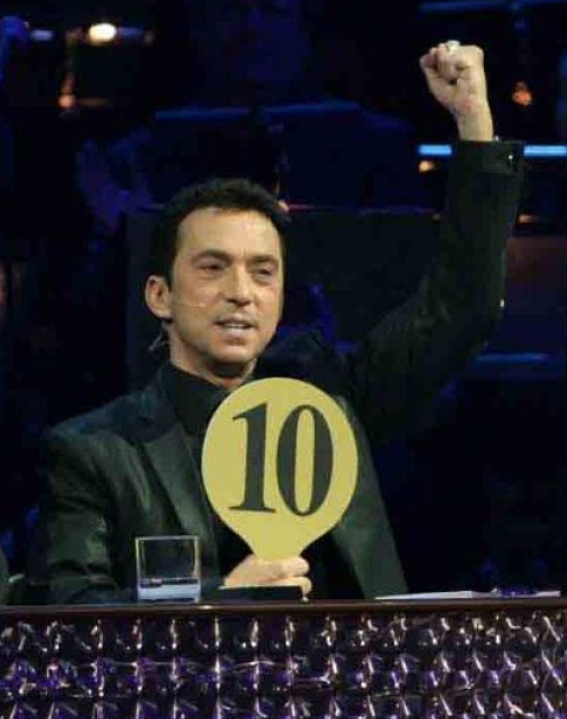
Bruno Tonioli

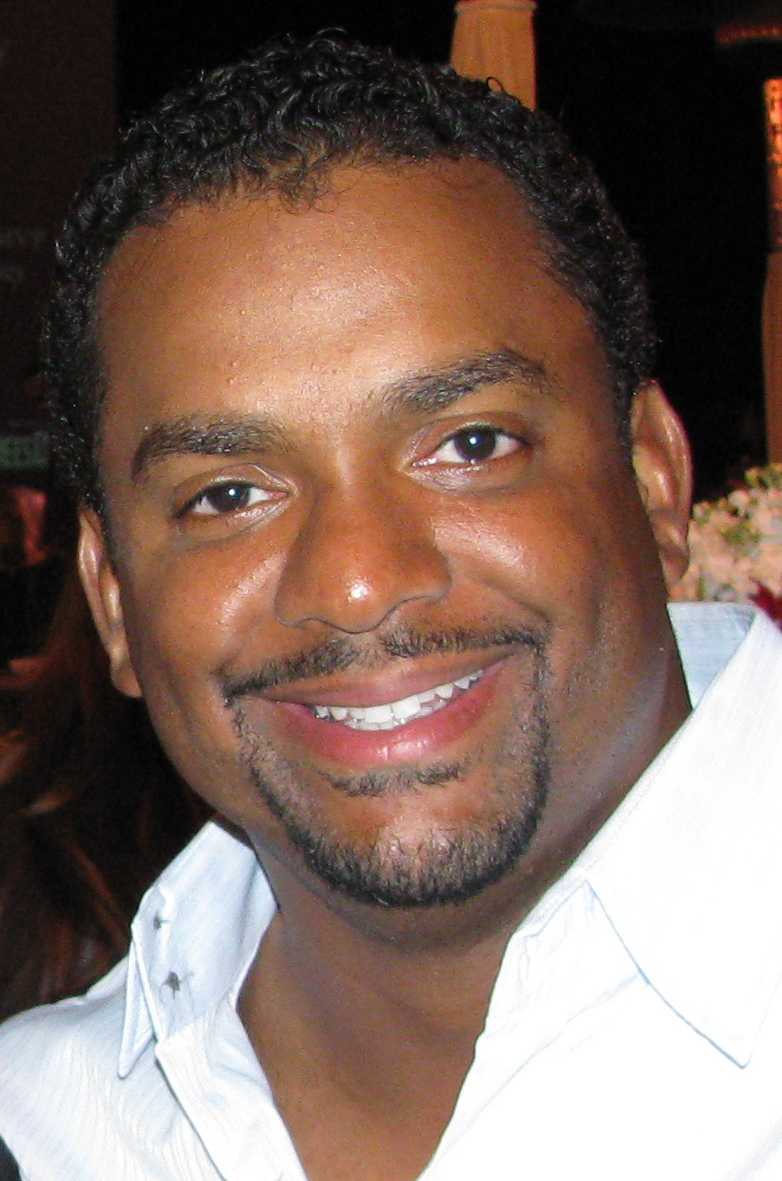
Alfonso Ribeiro (Guest)

The couples dance each week in a live show. The judges score each performance out of ten. The couples are then ranked according to the judges' scores and given points according to their rank, with the lowest scored couple receiving one point, and the highest scored couple receiving the most points (the maximum number of points available depends on the number of couples remaining in the competition). The public are also invited to vote for their favourite couples, and the couples are ranked again according to the number of votes they receive, again receiving points; the couple with the fewest votes receiving one point, and the couple with the most votes receiving the most points.

The points for judges' score and public vote are then added together, and the two couples with the fewest points are placed in the bottom two. If two couples have equal points, the points from the public vote are given precedence. As with the previous series, the bottom two couples have to perform a dance-off on the results show. Based on that performance alone, each judge then votes on which couple should stay and which couple should leave, with Shirley Ballas, as head judge, having the last and deciding vote.

== Professional dancers ==
On 30 May 2018, the list of professionals returning for the sixteenth series was revealed. Professionals from the last series who did not return included Brendan Cole and Chloe Hewitt. Graziano Di Prima, Luba Mushtuk, and Johannes Radebe replaced them. Mushtuk and Radebe did not have celebrity partners; however, Di Prima did.

== Couples ==
This series featured fifteen celebrity contestants. On 13 August 2018, the first three celebrities announced to be participating in the series were Katie Piper, Faye Tozer, and Danny John-Jules. Celebrity reveals continued across that month before concluding on 21 August on Good Morning Britain.

Celebrity	Notability	Professional partner	Status
Susannah Constantine	Television presenter & fashion journalist	Anton Du Beke	Eliminated 1st on 30 September 2018
Lee Ryan	Blue singer & EastEnders actor	Nadiya Bychkova	Eliminated 2nd on 7 October 2018
Katie Piper	Philanthropist & television presenter	Gorka Márquez	Eliminated 3rd on 14 October 2018
Vick Hope	Capital FM presenter	Graziano Di Prima	Eliminated 4th on 21 October 2018
Seann Walsh	Stand-up comedian	Katya Jones	Eliminated 5th on 28 October 2018
Dr. Ranj Singh	This Morning presenter & author	Janette Manrara	Eliminated 6th on 4 November 2018
Danny John-Jules	Stage & screen actor	Amy Dowden	Eliminated 7th on 11 November 2018
Kate Silverton	BBC News presenter & journalist	Aljaž Škorjanec	Eliminated 8th on 18 November 2018
Graeme Swann	England cricketer	Oti Mabuse	Eliminated 9th on 25 November 2018
Charles Venn	Casualty actor	Karen Clifton	Eliminated 10th on 2 December 2018
Lauren Steadman	Paralympic swimmer & paratriathlete	AJ Pritchard	Eliminated 11th on 9 December 2018
Ashley Roberts	The Pussycat Dolls singer	Pasha Kovalev	Runners-up on 15 December 2018
Faye Tozer	Steps singer	Giovanni Pernice	Runners-up on 15 December 2018
Joe Sugg	YouTube personality	Dianne Buswell	Runners-up on 15 December 2018
Stacey Dooley	Investigative journalist	Kevin Clifton	Winners on 15 December 2018

== Scoring chart ==
The highest score each week is indicated in bold green with a dagger (†), while the lowest score each week is indicated in italicized red with a double-dagger (‡).

Color key:

Winners
Runners-up
Bottom two
Eliminated

Strictly Come Dancing (series 16) - Weekly scores
Couple	Pl.	Week													
Couple	Pl.	1	2	1+2	3	4	5	6	7	8	9	10	11	12	13
Stacey & Kevin	1st	24	20	44	32	**33**†	33	35	36	32	33	39+4=43	38	39+36=75	39+36+39=114‡ (Note: This couple finished in first place.)
Ashley & Pasha	2nd	**29**†	**32**†	**61**†	35	32	36	**39**†	**39**†	**39**†	**40**†	36+7=43 (Note: This couple was in the bottom two, but was not eliminated.)	38	36+40=**76**†	40+40+40=**120**† (Note: This couple finished in second place.)
Faye & Giovanni	2nd	**29**†	31	60	**36**†	29	33	**39**†	38	36	38	39+6=**45**†	**40**†	37+39=**76**†	40+40+40=**120**†
Joe & Dianne	2nd	27	31	58	26	26	29	35	34	32	38	35+5=40	36	29+30=59	39+39+38=116
Lauren & AJ	5th	25	22	47	20	25	24	29	31	34	25‡	23+1=24‡	35‡	31+23=54‡ (Note: This couple was eliminated.)	
Charles & Karen	6th	25	25	50	25	25	36	25	28	35	38	30+3=33	35‡		
Graeme & Oti	7th	22	15	37	31	26	29	21	29	31	32	24+2=26			
Kate & Aljaž	8th	20	27	47	29	20	26	20‡	23	30	30				
Danny & Amy	9th	27	28	55	28	27	**37**†	30	22‡	27‡					
Dr. Ranj & Janette	10th	27	24	51	20	27	25	20‡	27						
Seann & Katya	11th	18	15	33	30	28	24	20‡							
Vick & Graziano	12th	18	27	45	27	29	20‡								
Katie & Gorka	13th	17	13	30	22	18‡									
Lee & Nadiya	14th	22	26	48	19‡										
Susannah & Anton	15th	12‡	12‡	24‡											

=== Average chart ===
This table only counts for dances scored on a traditional 40-point scale.

Couple	Rank by average	Total points	Number of dances	Total average
Ashley & Pasha	1st	591	16	36.9
Faye & Giovanni	2nd	584	16	36.5
Stacey & Kevin	3rd	544	16	34.0
Joe & Dianne	4th	524	16	32.8
Charles & Karen	5th	327	11	29.7
Danny & Amy	6th	226	8	28.3
Lauren & AJ	7th	347	13	26.7
Graeme & Oti	8th	260	10	26.0
Kate & Aljaž	9th	225	9	25.0
Dr. Ranj & Janette	10th	170	7	24.3
Vick & Graziano	11th	121	5	24.2
Seann & Katya	12th	135	6	22.5
Lee & Nadiya	13th	67	3	22.3
Katie & Gorka	14th	70	4	17.5
Susannah & Anton	15th	24	2	12.0

== Weekly scores ==
Unless indicated otherwise, individual judges' scores in the charts below (given in parentheses) are listed in this order from left to right: Craig Revel Horwood, Darcey Bussell, Shirley Ballas, Bruno Tonioli.

=== Week 1 ===
Couples are listed in the order they performed.

Couple	Scores	Dance	Music
Danny & Amy	27 (6, 7, 7, 7)	Foxtrot	"Top Cat Theme" — Hoyt Curtin
Kate & Aljaž	20 (4, 6, 4, 6)	Cha-cha-cha	"Kiss" — Art of Noise, feat. Tom Jones
Lauren & AJ	25 (6, 6, 6, 7)	Waltz	"Kissing You" — Des'ree
Seann & Katya	18 (3, 5, 4, 6)	Tango	"SexyBack" — Justin Timberlake
Vick & Graziano	18 (3, 5, 4, 6)	Jive	"Feel It Still" — Portugal. The Man
Susannah & Anton	12 (1, 4, 3, 4)	Samba	"Tico Tico" — Carmen Miranda
Charles & Karen	25 (6, 6, 6, 7)	Cha-cha-cha	"Ain't No Love (Ain't No Use)" — Melanie Williams
Ashley & Pasha	29 (7, 8, 7, 7)	Viennese waltz	"Perfect" — Ed Sheeran, feat. Beyoncé
Dr. Ranj & Janette	27 (6, 6, 8, 7)	Cha-cha-cha	"How Will I Know" — Whitney Houston
Katie & Gorka	17 (4, 4, 4, 5)	Waltz	"When We Were Young" — Adele
Graeme & Oti	22 (5, 6, 6, 5)	Samba	"Soul Limbo" — Booker T. & the M.G.'s
Stacey & Kevin	24 (6, 6, 6, 6)	Quickstep	"Dancing" — Kylie Minogue
Lee & Nadiya	22 (4, 6, 6, 6)	Waltz	"Take It to the Limit" — Eagles
Joe & Dianne	27 (6, 7, 7, 7)	Jive	"Take On Me" — A-ha
Faye & Giovanni	29 (7, 8, 7, 7)	Cha-cha-cha	"Lullaby" — Sigala & Paloma Faith

=== Week 2 ===
Musical guest: George Ezra — "Shotgun"

Couples are listed in the order they performed.

Couple	Scores	Dance	Music	Result
Stacey & Kevin	20 (4, 5, 5, 6)	Cha-cha-cha	"Came Here for Love" — Sigala & Ella Eyre	Safe
Charles & Karen	25 (5, 6, 7, 7)	Quickstep	"Sir Duke" — Stevie Wonder	Safe
Katie & Gorka	13 (2, 4, 3, 4)	Paso doble	"Confident" — Demi Lovato	Safe
Graeme & Oti	15 (3, 5, 3, 4)	American Smooth	"Try a Little Tenderness" — Otis Redding	Safe
Kate & Aljaž	27 (6, 7, 7, 7)	Tango	"No Roots" — Alice Merton	Safe
Joe & Dianne	31 (7, 8, 8, 8)	Charleston	"Cotton Eye Joe" — Rednex	Safe
Susannah & Anton	12 (1, 4, 4, 3)	Foxtrot	"They Can't Take That Away from Me" — Frank Sinatra & Natalie Cole	Eliminated
Lee & Nadiya	26 (6, 7, 6, 7)	Jive	"Blue Suede Shoes" — Elvis Presley	Bottom two
Danny & Amy	28 (7, 7, 7, 7)	Cha-cha-cha	"Beggin'" — Madcon	Safe
Vick & Graziano	27 (7, 7, 6, 7)	Waltz	"Somewhere" — from West Side Story	Safe
Dr. Ranj & Janette	24 (5, 6, 7, 6)	Salsa	"Fireball" — Pitbull, feat. John Ryan	Safe
Faye & Giovanni	31 (8, 8, 7, 8)	Viennese waltz	"It's a Man's Man's Man's World" — Seal	Safe
Lauren & AJ	22 (5, 6, 5, 6)	Charleston	"New Rules" — Postmodern Jukebox	Safe
Seann & Katya	15 (2, 4, 4, 5)	Jive	"I'm Still Standing" — Elton John	Safe
Ashley & Pasha	32 (8, 8, 7, 9)	Cha-cha-cha	"Boogie Wonderland" — Earth, Wind & Fire with The Emotions	Safe

Judges' votes to save

- Revel Horwood: Lee & Nadiya
- Bussell: Lee & Nadiya
- Tonioli: Lee & Nadiya
- Ballas: Did not vote, but would have voted to save Lee & Nadiya

=== Week 3: Movie Week ===
Musical guest: Gladys Knight — "Licence to Kill"

Couples are listed in the order they performed.

Couple	Scores	Dance	Music	Film	Result
Vick & Graziano	27 (6, 7, 7, 7)	Salsa	"Take a Chance on Me"	Mamma Mia!	Safe
Dr. Ranj & Janette	20 (4, 5, 5, 6)	Quickstep	"Prince Ali"	Aladdin	Safe
Lee & Nadiya	19 (3, 5, 5, 6)	Cha-cha-cha	"The Power of Love"	Back to the Future	Eliminated
Kate & Aljaž	29 (6, 7, 8, 8)	Foxtrot	"Why Don't You Do Right?"	Who Framed Roger Rabbit	Safe
Stacey & Kevin	32 (8, 8, 8, 8)	Jive	"Happy"	Despicable Me 2	Safe
Joe & Dianne	26 (6, 7, 6, 7)	American Smooth	"Breaking Free"	High School Musical	Safe
Graeme & Oti	31 (7, 8, 8, 8)	Charleston	"Spider-Man Theme"	Spider-Man	Safe
Ashley & Pasha	35 (8, 9, 9, 9)	Salsa	"(I've Had) The Time of My Life"	Dirty Dancing	Safe
Katie & Gorka	22 (5, 5, 6, 6)	Foxtrot	"City of Stars"	La La Land	Safe
Seann & Katya	30 (7, 7, 8, 8)	Paso doble	"Clubbed to Death"	The Matrix	Safe
Lauren & AJ	20 (4, 5, 5, 6)	Cha-cha-cha	"Fame"	Fame	Safe
Charles & Karen	25 (6, 6, 6, 7)	American Smooth	"Up Where We Belong"	An Officer and a Gentleman	Bottom two
Faye & Giovanni	36 (9, 9, 9, 9)	Quickstep	"You're the One That I Want"	Grease	Safe
Danny & Amy	28 (6, 7, 7, 8)	Paso doble	"The Greatest Show"	The Greatest Showman	Safe

Judges' votes to save

- Revel Horwood: Charles & Karen
- Bussell: Charles & Karen
- Tonioli: Charles & Karen
- Ballas: Did not vote, but would have voted to save Lee & Nadiya

=== Week 4 ===
Musical guests: Backstreet Boys — "Larger than Life", "I Want It That Way" & "Everybody (Backstreet's Back)"

Couples are listed in the order they performed.

Couple	Scores	Dance	Music	Result
Joe & Dianne	26 (5, 7, 7, 7)	Cha-cha-cha	"Just Got Paid" — Sigala, Ella Eyre & Meghan Trainor, feat. French Montana	Safe
Vick & Graziano	29 (7, 7, 7, 8)	Quickstep	"You Can't Hurry Love" — The Supremes	Safe
Danny & Amy	27 (6, 7, 7, 7)	Viennese waltz	"I've Gotta Be Me" — Sammy Davis Jr.	Safe
Faye & Giovanni	29 (7, 7, 7, 8)	Rumba	"Chandelier" — Sia	Safe
Katie & Gorka	18 (3, 5, 5, 5)	Jive	"Why Do Fools Fall in Love" — Frankie Lymon & The Teenagers	Eliminated
Charles & Karen	25 (6, 6, 6, 7)	Salsa	"Use It Up and Wear It Out" — Odyssey	Bottom two
Lauren & AJ	25 (6, 6, 6, 7)	Quickstep	"If You're Over Me" — Years & Years	Safe
Dr. Ranj & Janette	27 (6, 7, 7, 7)	Paso doble	"Canción del Mariachi" — Los Lobos	Safe
Kate & Aljaž	20 (4, 5, 5, 6)	Samba	"Africa" — Toto	Safe
Graeme & Oti	26 (5, 7, 7, 7)	Jive	"Don't Stop Me Now" — Queen	Safe
Ashley & Pasha	32 (8, 8, 8, 8)	Tango	"Look What You Made Me Do" — Taylor Swift	Safe
Seann & Katya	28 (6, 7, 8, 7)	Charleston	"Bills" — LunchMoney Lewis	Safe
Stacey & Kevin	33 (8, 8, 8, 9)	Foxtrot	"Hi Ho Silver Lining" — Jeff Beck	Safe

Judges' votes to save

- Revel Horwood: Charles & Karen
- Bussell: Charles & Karen
- Tonioli: Charles & Karen
- Ballas: Did not vote, but would have voted to save Charles & Karen

=== Week 5 ===
Individual judges' scores in the chart below (given in parentheses) are listed in this order from left to right: Craig Revel Horwood, Darcey Bussell, Shirley Ballas, Alfonso Ribeiro.

Musical guest: Paloma Faith — "Loyal"

Actor Alfonso Ribeiro filled in as a guest judge while Bruno Tonioli was unavailable while filming for Dancing with the Stars.

Couples are listed in the order they performed.

Couple	Scores	Dance	Music	Result
Dr. Ranj & Janette	25 (5, 6, 7, 7)	American Smooth	"Wouldn't It Be Nice" — The Beach Boys	Safe
Lauren & AJ	24 (4, 6, 7, 7)	Contemporary	"Runnin' (Lose It All)" — Naughty Boy, feat. Beyoncé & Arrow Benjamin	Safe
Graeme & Oti	29 (6, 7, 8, 8)	Tango	"Roxanne" — The Police	Safe
Ashley & Pasha	36 (9, 9, 9, 9)	Rumba	"Something About the Way You Look Tonight" — Elton John	Safe
Seann & Katya	24 (5, 6, 6, 7)	Quickstep	"Lightning Bolt" — Jake Bugg	Bottom two
Stacey & Kevin	33 (8, 7, 9, 9)	Samba	"Tequila" — David Hirschfelder & The Bogo Pogo Orchestra	Safe
Joe & Dianne	29 (6, 7, 8, 8)	Waltz	"Rainbow Connection" — Sleeping at Last	Safe
Vick & Graziano	20 (4, 6, 4, 6)	Cha-cha-cha	"More than Friends" — James Hype, feat. Kelli-Leigh	Eliminated
Kate & Aljaž	26 (6, 6, 6, 8)	Viennese waltz	"Finally Mine" — Juliet Roberts	Safe
Danny & Amy	37 (9, 10, 9, 9)	Jive	"Flip, Flop and Fly" — Ellis Hall	Safe
Faye & Giovanni	33 (8, 9, 8, 8)	Foxtrot	"Just the Way You Are" — Bruno Mars	Safe
Charles & Karen	36 (9, 9, 9, 9)	Street/Commercial	"Get Up Offa That Thing" — James Brown	Safe

Judges' votes to save

- Revel Horwood: Vick & Graziano
- Bussell: Seann & Katya
- Ribeiro: Seann & Katya
- Ballas: Seann & Katya

=== Week 6: Halloween Week ===
Musical guest: Rita Ora — "Let You Love Me"

Couple	Scores	Dance	Music	Result
Graeme & Oti	21 (4, 5, 6, 6)	Cha-cha-cha	"Thriller" — Michael Jackson	Bottom two
Stacey & Kevin	35 (8, 9, 9, 9)	Tango	"Doctor Who Theme" — Ron Grainer	Safe
Dr. Ranj & Janette	20 (5, 5, 5, 5)	Jive	"Monster Mash" — Bobby "Boris" Pickett	Safe
Kate & Aljaž	20 (4, 6, 5, 5)	Rumba	"Skin" — Rag'n'Bone Man	Safe
Danny & Amy	30 (6, 8, 7, 9)	American Smooth	"Spirit in the Sky" — Doctor and the Medics	Safe
Ashley & Pasha	39 (9, 10, 10, 10)	Charleston	"Witch Doctor" — Don Lang	Safe
Seann & Katya	20 (3, 5, 6, 6)	Viennese waltz	"I Put a Spell on You" — Screamin' Jay Hawkins	Eliminated
Charles & Karen	25 (6, 6, 6, 7)	Jive	"Time Warp" — from The Rocky Horror Picture Show	Safe
Faye & Giovanni	39 (9, 10, 10, 10)	Theatre/Jazz	"Fever" — Peggy Lee	Safe
Joe & Dianne	35 (8, 9, 9, 9)	Foxtrot	"Youngblood" — 5 Seconds of Summer	Safe
Lauren & AJ	29 (6, 7, 8, 8)	Paso doble	"Poison" — Nicole Scherzinger	Safe

Judges' votes to save

- Revel Horwood: Graeme & Oti
- Bussell: Graeme & Oti
- Tonioli: Graeme & Oti
- Ballas: Did not vote, but would have voted to save Graeme & Oti

=== Week 7 ===
Musical guests:

- The Kingdom Choir — Aretha Franklin medley
- Jess Glynne — "Thursday"

Couple	Scores	Dance	Music	Result
Lauren & AJ	31 (7, 8, 8, 8)	Jive	"Girlfriend" — Avril Lavigne	Safe
Graeme & Oti	29 (6, 7, 8, 8)	Waltz	"The Last Waltz" — Engelbert Humperdinck	Safe
Kate & Aljaž	23 (4, 6, 6, 7)	Argentine tango	"Assassin's Tango" — John Powell	Safe
Dr. Ranj & Janette	27 (6, 7, 7, 7)	Samba	"Freedom! '90" — George Michael	Eliminated
Stacey & Kevin	36 (9, 9, 9, 9)	Street/Commercial	"Empire State of Mind (Part II) Broken Down" — Alicia Keys	Safe
Danny & Amy	22 (4, 6, 5, 7)	Quickstep	"Freedom" — Pharrell Williams	Safe
Ashley & Pasha	39 (9, 10, 10, 10)	Foxtrot	"Orange Colored Sky" — Natalie Cole	Safe
Faye & Giovanni	38 (9, 10, 9, 10)	Tango	"Call Me" — Blondie	Safe
Charles & Karen	28 (6, 7, 7, 8)	Viennese waltz	"Piano Man" — Billy Joel	Bottom two
Joe & Dianne	34 (7, 9, 9, 9)	Paso doble	"Pompeii" — Bastille	Safe

Judges' votes to save

- Revel Horwood: Dr. Ranj & Janette
- Bussell: Charles & Karen
- Tonioli: Charles & Karen
- Ballas: Charles & Karen

=== Week 8 ===
Musical guests:

- RAF Spitfires Choir — "Rise Up"
- Andrea & Matteo Bocelli— "Fall on Me"

Couple	Scores	Dance	Music	Result
Kate & Aljaž	30 (7, 7, 8, 8)	Quickstep	"I Want You to Want Me" — Letters to Cleo	Safe
Danny & Amy	27 (6, 7, 7, 7)	Samba	"Feels Like Home" — Sigala, feat. Fuse ODG, Sean Paul & Kent Jones	Eliminated
Ashley & Pasha	39 (9, 10, 10, 10)	Contemporary	"Unsteady" — X Ambassadors	Safe
Graeme & Oti	31 (7, 8, 8, 8)	Salsa	"Follow the Leader" — The Soca Boys	Bottom two
Faye & Giovanni	36 (9, 9, 8, 10)	Jive	"Reet Petite" — Jackie Wilson	Safe
Stacey & Kevin	32 (8, 8, 8, 8)	Waltz	"Moon River" — Audrey Hepburn	Safe
Joe & Dianne	32 (7, 8, 8, 9)	Samba	"MMMBop" — Hanson	Safe
Lauren & AJ	34 (8, 8, 9, 9)	Viennese waltz	"You Are the Reason" — Calum Scott, feat. Leona Lewis	Safe
Charles & Karen	35 (8, 9, 9, 9)	Charleston	"No Diggity" — Minimatic	Safe

Judges' votes to save

- Revel Horwood: Danny & Amy
- Bussell: Graeme & Oti
- Tonioli: Graeme & Oti
- Ballas: Graeme & Oti

=== Week 9: Blackpool Week ===
Musical guests:

- Gloria Estefan — "Dr. Beat", "Conga", "Rhythm Is Gonna Get You", "1–2–3" & "Get on Your Feet"
- Take That — "Out of Our Heads"

This week's episode was staged in the Tower Ballroom at the Blackpool Tower in Blackpool, Lancashire. Couples are listed in the order they performed.

Couple	Scores	Dance	Music	Result
Stacey & Kevin	33 (7, 8, 9, 9)	Salsa	"Ooh Aah... Just a Little Bit" — Gina G	Safe
Lauren & AJ	25 (5, 6, 7, 7)	Argentine tango	"River" — Bishop Briggs	Safe
Graeme & Oti	32 (7, 8, 8, 9)	Theatre/Jazz	"The Trolley Song" — from Meet Me in St. Louis	Bottom two
Faye & Giovanni	38 (9, 9, 10, 10)	Paso doble	"Unstoppable" — E.S. Posthumus	Safe
Kate & Aljaž	30 (7, 7, 8, 8)	American Smooth	"Everlasting Love" — Love Affair	Eliminated
Charles & Karen	38 (9, 9, 10, 10)	Samba	"La Bamba" — Connie Francis	Safe
Joe & Dianne	38 (8, 10, 10, 10)	Quickstep	"Dancin' Fool" — from Copacabana	Safe
Ashley & Pasha	40 (10, 10, 10, 10)	Jive	"Shake a Tail Feather" — from The Blues Brothers	Safe

Judges' votes to save

- Revel Horwood: Graeme & Oti
- Bussell: Graeme & Oti
- Tonioli: Graeme & Oti
- Ballas: Did not vote, but would have voted to save Graeme & Oti

=== Week 10 ===
Musical guest: Rod Stewart — "Farewell"

Each couple performed one routine and then all couples participated in a Lindy Hop marathon for additional points. Couples are listed in the order they performed.

Couple	Scores	Dance	Music	Result
Graeme & Oti	24 (6, 6, 6, 6)	Quickstep	"Sing, Sing, Sing (With a Swing)" — The Andrews Sisters	Eliminated
Ashley & Pasha	36 (8, 9, 9, 10)	Samba	"Hot Hot Hot" — Arrow	Bottom two
Faye & Giovanni	39 (9, 10, 10, 10)	Waltz	"See the Day" — Dee C Lee	Safe
Joe & Dianne	35 (7, 8, 10, 10)	Street/Commercial	"Jump Around" — House of Pain	Safe
Charles & Karen	30 (6, 8, 8, 8)	Tango	"Eleanor Rigby" — Big Country	Safe
Lauren & AJ	23 (5, 6, 6, 6)	Salsa	"Familiar" — Liam Payne & J Balvin	Safe
Stacey & Kevin	39 (9, 10, 10, 10)	Paso doble	"Malagueña" — Brian Setzer	Safe
Lauren & AJ	1	Lindy Hop-a-thon (Lindy Hop Marathon)	"Do Your Thing" — Basement Jaxx	
Graeme & Oti	2	Lindy Hop-a-thon (Lindy Hop Marathon)	"Do Your Thing" — Basement Jaxx	
Charles & Karen	3	Lindy Hop-a-thon (Lindy Hop Marathon)	"Do Your Thing" — Basement Jaxx	
Stacey & Kevin	4	Lindy Hop-a-thon (Lindy Hop Marathon)	"Do Your Thing" — Basement Jaxx	
Joe & Dianne	5	Lindy Hop-a-thon (Lindy Hop Marathon)	"Do Your Thing" — Basement Jaxx	
Faye & Giovanni	6	Lindy Hop-a-thon (Lindy Hop Marathon)	"Do Your Thing" — Basement Jaxx	
Ashley & Pasha	7	Lindy Hop-a-thon (Lindy Hop Marathon)	"Do Your Thing" — Basement Jaxx	

Judges' votes to save

- Revel Horwood: Ashley & Pasha
- Bussell: Ashley & Pasha
- Tonioli: Ashley & Pasha
- Ballas: Did not vote, but would have voted to save Ashley & Pasha

=== Week 11: Musicals Week (Quarter-final) ===
Musical guests:

- Trevor Dion Nicholas — "The Rhythm of Life" (from Sweet Charity)
- Adam Lambert — "We Are the Champions" (from We Will Rock You)

Couples are listed in the order they performed.

Couple	Scores	Dance	Music	Musical	Result
Lauren & AJ	35 (8, 9, 9, 9)	American Smooth	"I'm in Love with a Wonderful Guy"	South Pacific	Safe
Faye & Giovanni	40 (10, 10, 10, 10)	Charleston	"The Lonely Goatherd"	The Sound of Music	Safe
Charles & Karen	35 (8, 9, 9, 9)	Rumba	"Maria"	West Side Story	Eliminated
Ashley & Pasha	38 (9, 10, 9, 10)	Quickstep	"Don't Rain on My Parade"	Funny Girl	Bottom two
Stacey & Kevin	38 (9, 9, 10, 10)	American Smooth	"I Dreamed a Dream"	Les Misérables	Safe
Joe & Dianne	36 (8, 9, 9, 10)	Salsa	"Joseph Megamix"	Joseph and the Amazing Technicolor Dreamcoat	Safe

Judges' votes to save

- Revel Horwood: Ashley & Pasha
- Bussell: Ashley & Pasha
- Tonioli: Ashley & Pasha
- Ballas: Did not vote, but would have voted to save Ashley & Pasha

=== Week 12: Semi-final ===
Musical guests: Little Mix — "Woman Like Me"

Each couple performed two routines, and are listed in the order they performed.

Couple	Scores	Dance	Music	Result
Stacey & Kevin	39 (9, 10, 10, 10)	Charleston	"Five Foot Two, Eyes of Blue" — Spike Jones	Safe
Stacey & Kevin	36 (8, 9, 10, 9)	Viennese waltz	"You're My World" — Cilla Black	Safe
Joe & Dianne	29 (6, 8, 7, 8)	Viennese waltz	"This Year's Love" — David Gray	Safe
Joe & Dianne	30 (6, 8, 8, 8)	Argentine tango	"Red Right Hand" — Nick Cave and the Bad Seeds	Safe
Ashley & Pasha	36 (9, 9, 9, 9)	Paso doble	"Spectrum" — Florence and the Machine	Bottom two
Ashley & Pasha	40 (10, 10, 10, 10)	American Smooth	"Ain't That a Kick in the Head?" — Dean Martin	Bottom two
Lauren & AJ	31 (7, 8, 8, 8)	Tango	"Nutbush City Limits" — Tina Turner	Eliminated
Lauren & AJ	23 (5, 6, 6, 6)	Samba	"Rock the Boat" — The Hues Corporation	Eliminated
Faye & Giovanni	37 (9, 9, 9, 10)	Samba	"I Go to Rio" — Pablo Cruise	Safe
Faye & Giovanni	39 (9, 10, 10, 10)	Argentine tango	"La cumparsita" — Machiko Ozawa	Safe

Judges' votes to save

- Revel Horwood: Ashley & Pasha
- Bussell: Ashley & Pasha
- Tonioli: Ashley & Pasha
- Ballas: Did not vote, but would have voted to save Ashley & Pasha

=== Week 13: Final ===
Musical guest: Michael Bublé — "Such a Night"

Each couple performed three routines: one chosen by the judges, their showdance routine, and their favourite dance of the series. Couples are listed in the order they performed.

Couple	Scores	Dance	Music	Result
Ashley & Pasha	40 (10, 10, 10, 10)	Salsa	"(I've Had) The Time of My Life" — from Dirty Dancing	Runners-up
Ashley & Pasha	40 (10, 10, 10, 10)	Showdance	"Keeping Your Head Up" — Birdy	Runners-up
Ashley & Pasha	40 (10, 10, 10, 10)	Charleston	"Witch Doctor" — Don Lang	Runners-up
Stacey & Kevin	39 (9, 10, 10, 10)	Foxtrot	"Hi Ho Silver Lining" — Jeff Beck	Winners
Stacey & Kevin	36 (8, 9, 9, 10)	Showdance	"Land of 1000 Dances" — Wilson Pickett	Winners
Stacey & Kevin	39 (9, 10, 10, 10)	Paso doble	"Malagueña" — Brian Setzer	Winners
Faye & Giovanni	40 (10, 10, 10, 10)	Viennese waltz	"It's a Man's Man's Man's World" — Seal	Runners-up
Faye & Giovanni	40 (10, 10, 10, 10)	Showdance	"Lullaby of Broadway" — Harry Warren & Al Dubin	Runners-up
Faye & Giovanni	40 (10, 10, 10, 10)	Theatre/Jazz	"Fever" — Peggy Lee	Runners-up
Joe & Dianne	39 (9, 10, 10, 10)	Paso doble	"Pompeii" — Bastille	Runners-up
Joe & Dianne	39 (9, 10, 10, 10)	Showdance	"I Bet You Look Good on The Dancefloor" — Arctic Monkeys	Runners-up
Joe & Dianne	38 (9, 9, 10, 10)	Charleston	"Cotton Eye Joe" — Rednex	Runners-up

== Dance chart ==
The couples performed the following each week:

- Weeks 1–9: One unlearned dance
- Week 10: One unlearned dance & Lindy Hop marathon
- Week 11 (Quarter-final): One unlearned dance
- Week 12 (Semi-final): Two unlearned dances
- Week 13 (Final): Judges' choice, showdance & favourite dance of the series

Strictly Come Dancing (series 16) - Dance chart
Couple	Week																
Couple	1	2	3	4	5	6	7	8	9	10		11	12		13		
Stacey & Kevin	Quickstep	Cha-cha-cha	Jive	Foxtrot	Samba	Tango	Street/Commercial	Waltz	Salsa	Paso doble	Lindy Hop; Marathon	American Smooth	Charleston	Viennese waltz	Foxtrot	Showdance	Paso doble
Ashley & Pasha	Viennese waltz	Cha-cha-cha	Salsa	Tango	Rumba	Charleston	Foxtrot	Contemp.	Jive	Samba	Lindy Hop; Marathon	Quickstep	Paso doble	American Smooth	Salsa	Showdance	Charleston
Faye & Giovanni	Cha-cha-cha	Viennese waltz	Quickstep	Rumba	Foxtrot	Theatre/Jazz	Tango	Jive	Paso doble	Waltz	Lindy Hop; Marathon	Charleston	Samba	Argentine tango	Viennese waltz	Showdance	Theatre/Jazz
Joe & Dianne	Jive	Charleston	American Smooth	Cha-cha-cha	Waltz	Foxtrot	Paso doble	Samba	Quickstep	Street/Commercial	Lindy Hop; Marathon	Salsa	Viennese waltz	Argentine tango	Paso doble	Showdance	Charleston
Lauren & AJ	Waltz	Charleston	Cha-cha-cha	Quickstep	Contemp.	Paso doble	Jive	Viennese waltz	Argentine tango	Salsa	Lindy Hop; Marathon	American Smooth	Tango	Samba			
Charles & Karen	Cha-cha-cha	Quickstep	American Smooth	Salsa	Street/Commercial	Jive	Viennese waltz	Charleston	Samba	Tango	Lindy Hop; Marathon	Rumba					
Graeme & Oti	Samba	American Smooth	Charleston	Jive	Tango	Cha-cha-cha	Waltz	Salsa	Theatre/Jazz	Quickstep	Lindy Hop; Marathon						
Kate & Aljaž	Cha-cha-cha	Tango	Foxtrot	Samba	Viennese waltz	Rumba	Argentine tango	Quickstep	American Smooth								
Danny & Amy	Foxtrot	Cha-cha-cha	Paso doble	Viennese waltz	Jive	American Smooth	Quickstep	Samba									
Dr. Ranj & Janette	Cha-cha-cha	Salsa	Quickstep	Paso doble	American Smooth	Jive	Samba										
Seann & Katya	Tango	Jive	Paso doble	Charleston	Quickstep	Viennese waltz											
Vick & Graziano	Jive	Waltz	Salsa	Quickstep	Cha-cha-cha												
Katie & Gorka	Waltz	Paso doble	Foxtrot	Jive													
Lee & Nadiya	Waltz	Jive	Cha-cha-cha														
Susannah & Anton	Samba	Foxtrot															

== Ratings ==
Weekly ratings for each show on BBC One. All ratings are provided by BARB.

Episode	Date	Official rating (millions)	Weekly rank for BBC One	Weekly rank for all UK TV	Share
Launch show	8 September	9.33	2	2	40.9%
Week 1	22 September	10.76	2	2	47.3%
Week 2	29 September	9.94	1	1	46.8%
Week 2 results	30 September	9.37	2	2	41.7%
Week 3	6 October	10.88	2	2	46.8%
Week 3 results	7 October	9.91	3	3	46.8%
Week 4	13 October	12.03	1	1	51.2%
Week 4 results	14 October	9.97	2	2	40.0%
Week 5	20 October	11.54	1	1	49.4%
Week 5 results	21 October	9.39	2	3	—N/a
Week 6	27 October	11.47	1	1	49.3%
Week 6 results	28 October	9.89	2	2	38.7%
Week 7	3 November	11.13	1	1	48.0%
Week 7 results	4 November	9.61	2	3	39.9%
Week 8	10 November	11.55	1	1	47.0%
Week 8 results	11 November	9.74	2	2	39.9%
Week 9	17 November	11.64	1	2	48.6%
Week 9 results	18 November	9.60	2	3	39.0%
Week 10	24 November	11.70	1	8	47.4%
Week 10 results	25 November	9.43	2	9	39.0%
Week 11	1 December	11.69	1	6	48.8%
Week 11 results	2 December	9.83	2	9	39.7%
Week 12	8 December	10.62	1	8	47.0%
Week 12 results	9 December	9.57	2	9	40.3%
Week 13	15 December	12.99	1	1	54.4%
Series average (excl. launch show)	2018	10.59	—N/a	—N/a	45.1%
