= Joe Sugg =

English YouTuber (born 1991)

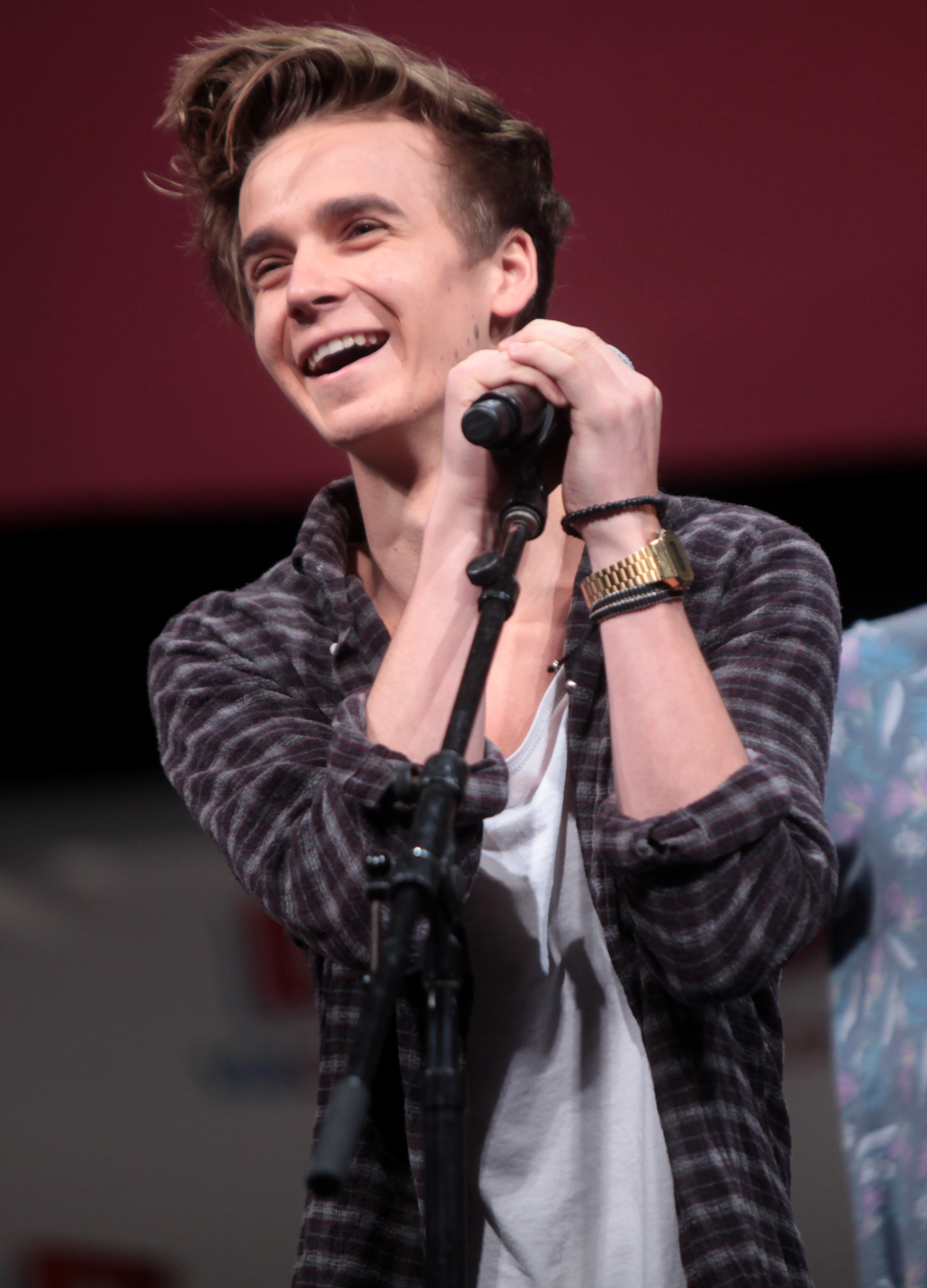
- Sugg in 2014
- Born: Joseph Graham Sugg; 8 September 1991 (age 35); Lacock, Wiltshire, England
- Occupation: YouTuber
- Partner: Dianne Buswell (2018–present)
- Children: 1
- Relatives: Zoe Sugg (sister)

YouTube information
- Channel: ThatcherJoe
- Years active: 2012–present
- Genres: Vlogs; comedy
- Subscribers: 7.22 million
- Views: 1.33 billion
- Last updated: 23 April 2026

Joseph Graham Sugg (born 8 September 1991) is an English YouTuber, vlogger, actor, author and businessman. In 2012, he began posting videos on the YouTube channel ThatcherJoe, which peaked at over 8 million subscribers. In 2018, he was a finalist on the sixteenth series of Strictly Come Dancing, and in 2019, he portrayed Ogie Anhorn in the West End production of Waitress. He is the younger brother of fellow YouTuber Zoe Sugg.

== Early life and ancestry ==
Sugg was born in Lacock, Wiltshire, and attended The Corsham School in Corsham, Wiltshire, where he gained two A*s, an A and a B in his A-levels. The name of his YouTube 'ThatcherJoe' channel is derived from his apprenticeship as a roof thatcher. He is the younger brother of Zoe Sugg, who is also a blogger and internet personality, known on YouTube as Zoella.

In a November 2021 episode of Who Do You Think You Are?, Sugg discovered that his ancestors from Jersey were working in electrical telegraphy in the early years of its development and implementation. He also found that his 7× great-grandparents were Huguenot refugees from Frênes in Normandy who fled religious persecution in France and made their way to Jersey in the mid-eighteenth century. He also discovered that another ancestor lived and worked in late 17th-century London as a jeweller and survived the Great Fire of London.

== Career ==
=== YouTube ===
Sugg created his 'ThatcherJoe' channel in December 2011 and reached the one-million-subscriber mark two years later. His channel became known for its pranks, impressions and challenge videos, such as the Whisper challenge, which became a popular YouTube trend after Sugg created a YouTuber version of the challenge in 2014. In January 2013, Sugg began his vlogging channel, 'ThatcherJoeVlogs', and in June 2014, he created his gaming channel, 'ThatcherJoeGames'.

In September 2020, Sugg announced that he would be the voice of the robot R-41 in Daleks!, an animated Doctor Who series which was released on YouTube in November 2020 as part of Time Lord Victorious.

In May 2022, it was revealed that Sugg had voiced the host of an animated chat show aimed at children and families called Corpse Talk, based on a series of graphic novels and comics about various historical figures, which is available on YouTube.

=== Film and television ===
Sugg had an uncredited voiceover role as a seagull in the 2015 UK version of the film The SpongeBob Movie: Sponge Out of Water. Also in 2015, Sugg appeared alongside Caspar Lee in the direct-to-DVD film Joe and Caspar Hit the Road, which was shown on British television channel E4 in April 2016. A second DVD, Joe & Caspar Hit the Road USA, was released in 2016. Alongside fellow YouTubers Alfie Deyes and Marcus Butler, Sugg starred in an episode of the British television show Release the Hounds, which aired in March 2017.

In 2018, Sugg became the first 'social media star' to appear on Strictly Come Dancing, and he was partnered with professional dancer Dianne Buswell. The pair reached the final and finished as runners-up. Shortly after the final, the BBC announced Sugg as co-presenter of New Year Live, alongside Stacey Dooley. On 22 February 2019, Sugg co-hosted The One Show on BBC One, with Alex Jones, and he was one of the hosts for the Red Nose Day telethon on the BBC on 15 March 2019.

Sugg voiced Gus in the UK version of the film Wonder Park (2019). In May 2019, he guest starred on the Cartoon Network show, The Amazing World of Gumball, as the voice of Azreal in the UK version of the episode; The Drama. In July 2019, Sugg announced that he would have a cameo voiceover role in the 2019 Aardman film A Shaun the Sheep Movie: Farmageddon.

In March 2020, Sugg appeared as a contestant on The Great Stand Up to Cancer Bake Off, in which he fainted due to a flesh wound, but recovered to take the title of Star Baker.

It was announced in August 2020 that Sugg would make his television acting debut in the fourth season of the BBC One drama The Syndicate. In May 2021, it was confirmed that Sugg had joined the cast of the animated adaptation of The Amazing Maurice, which was released in December 2022.

In January 2026, Sugg and Dianne Buswell announced they were producing and co-hosting a TV show together titled Raiders of the Lost Crafts for Sky History, where they travel around the UK trying traditional crafts.

=== Music and stage ===
Sugg was a member of the YouTube Boyband, which raised money for Comic Relief and became a viral hit. He also featured on the 2014 single "Do They Know It's Christmas?" as part of the Band Aid 30 charity supergroup, raising money for the Ebola virus epidemic in West Africa. In September 2018, Sugg collaborated with Conor Maynard and then-housemate Byron Langley to take part in a YouTube one hour song challenge and released "You Want My Sister". In January 2020, Sugg released his solo debut single, "Say It Now". In August 2021, he released his second single, "Wild Things".

In August 2019, Sugg was cast as Ogie Anhorn in the musical Waitress in London's West End. He debuted in the role on 9 September 2019, and gave his final performance on 30 November 2019.

=== Graphic novels and book ===
Sugg created the storyline and characters for the graphic novel Username: Evie, published in 2015 by Hodder & Stoughton. The writing is by Matt Whyman, with illustrations by Amrit Birdi. The story is about bullied teenage schoolgirl Evie, who dreams of a place she can be herself. Her terminally ill father creates a virtual reality for her, but dies before it is completed. After he leaves her an app that allows entry, Evie is transported into a world where everything is influenced by her personality. Username: Evie became the fastest-selling graphic novel in the UK since records began, selling 13,745 copies in its debut week. A sequel, Username: Regenerated, was published in 2016, and the third and final graphic novel in the series, Username: Uprising, was released in 2017.

In March 2022, Sugg announced that he had written a book called Grow, a part memoir, part practical guide about reconnecting with nature in the digital age, which was published in September 2022.

=== Businesses ===
In 2018, Sugg and Caspar Lee established a management company, Margravine (now MVE), to support up-and-coming digital talent.

In August 2022, it was announced that Sugg's production company Final Straw Productions had partnered with BBC Studios to develop entertainment and factual entertainment formats for audiences of all ages. In 2024 Final Straw Productions released a dating show pilot on YouTube called "Date Me At My Worst", hosted by TikTok star Max Balegde.

== Strictly Come Dancing ==
From September 2018, Sugg participated in the sixteenth series of Strictly Come Dancing, partnered with Australian dancer Dianne Buswell. They reached the final, finishing as runners-up.

Week no.	Dance/song	Judges' score				Total	Result
Week no.	Dance/song	Horwood	Bussell	Ballas	Tonioli	Total	Result
1	Jive / "Take On Me"	6	7	7	7	27	No elimination
2	Charleston / "Cotton Eye Joe"	7	8	8	8	31	Safe
3	American Smooth / "Breaking Free"	6	7	6	7	26	Safe
4	Cha-Cha-Cha / "Just Got Paid"	5	7	7	7	26	Safe
5	Waltz / "Rainbow Connection"	6	7	8	8^{A}	29	Safe
6	Foxtrot / "Youngblood"	8	9	9	9	35	Safe
7	Paso Doble / "Pompeii"	7	9	9	9	34	Safe
8	Samba / "MMMBop"	7	8	8	9	32	Safe
9	Quickstep / "Dancing Fool"	8	10	10	10	38	Safe
10	Street and Commercial / "Jump Around"	7	8	10	10	35	Safe
11	Salsa / "Joseph Megamix"	8	9	9	10	36	Safe
12	Viennese Waltz / "This Year's Love"	6	8	7	8	29	Safe
12	Argentine Tango / "Red Right Hand"	6	8	8	8	30	Safe
Final	Paso Doble / "Pompeii"	9	10	10	10	39	Runner-up
Final	Showdance / "I Bet You Look Good on the Dancefloor"	9	10	10	10	39	Runner-up
Final	Charleston / "Cotton Eye Joe"	9	9	10	10	38	Runner-up

Notes
^A Alfonso Ribeiro filled in for Tonioli

=== Strictly Come Dancing: The Live Tour! 2019 ===
Sugg, along with his professional dance partner Dianne Buswell, appeared in the Strictly Come Dancing Live! tour during January and February 2019. The pair made Strictly Live Tour history by winning 25 shows in a row against six other couples, later becoming the overall tour winners having won 28 of the 29 shows.

Couples	Number of wins	Number of 2nd places	Wins%
Joe Sugg & Dianne Buswell	28	1	97%
Stacey Dooley & Aljaž Skorjanec	1	24	3%
Faye Tozer & Giovanni Pernice	0	4	0%
Ashley Roberts & Pasha Kovalev	0	0	0%
Graeme Swann & Karen Hauer	0	0	0%
Dr. Ranj Singh & Janette Manrara	0	0	0%
Lauren Steadman & AJ Pritchard	0	0	0%

=== Strictly Come Dancing: The Official Podcast ===
In August 2019, it was announced that Sugg would be taking over as co-host of the show's official podcast, which he presented until 2023.

=== 2019 Christmas special ===
On 5 November 2019, it was announced that Sugg would be participating in the 2019 Christmas special episode. A week later it was revealed that he would be dancing with Dianne Buswell, as he did in series 16 of the show.

Dance/song	Judges' score				Total	Result
Dance/song	Horwood	Mabuse	Ballas	Tonioli	Total	Result
Street and Commercial / "Sleigh Ride"	10	10	10	10	40	2nd

== Personal life ==
Sugg has been in a relationship with Australian dancer Dianne Buswell, his dance partner from Strictly Come Dancing, since late 2018. The couple confirmed that they were living together in August 2019, and in February 2021, they revealed that they had bought a house together. Their son was born in March 2026 through an emergency C-section.

Sugg is an ambassador for the charity Age UK.

== Filmography ==
=== Film ===
Year	Title	Role	Notes
2015	The SpongeBob Movie: Sponge Out of Water	Kyle the Seagull	Voice role; UK version
2015	Joe and Caspar Hit the Road	Himself	
2016	Joe and Caspar Hit The Road: USA	Himself	
2019	Wonder Park	Gus	Voice role; UK version
2019	A Shaun the Sheep Movie: Farmageddon	Pizza Boy	Voice role
2022	The Amazing Maurice	Sardines	Voice role

=== Television ===
Year	Title	Role	Notes
2017	Release the Hounds	Himself	Contestant
2018	Strictly Come Dancing	Himself	Runner-up
2018–2019	New Year's Eve Fireworks	Co-host	With Stacey Dooley
2019	The One Show	Co-host	With Alex Jones; 1 episode
2019	The Amazing World Of Gumball	Azreal	Voice role; UK version
2019	Strictly Come Dancing Christmas Special	Himself	Runner-up
2020	Would I Lie to You	Himself	Guest panellist
2020	The Great Stand Up to Cancer Bake Off	Himself	Contestant; winner
2020	I'll Get This	Himself	Contestant
2020	Countryfile	Himself	Guest presenter
2020	Daleks!	R-41	Voice role
2021	Michael McIntyre's The Wheel	Himself	Participant
2021	The Syndicate	Sam	Recurring role; 3 episodes
2021	Who Do You Think You Are?	Himself	Participant
2022	Richard Osman's House of Games	Himself	Panellist; weekly champion
2023	Great British Menu	Himself	Guest judge
2023	The Chase: Celebrity Special	Himself	Contestant
2025	The Hit List	Himself	Contestant; winner
TBA	Raiders of the Lost Crafts	Co-host	With Dianne Buswell

=== Stage ===
Year	Title	Role	Venue
2019	Waitress	Ogie Anhorn	Adelphi Theatre

=== Podcast ===
Year	Title	Role
2019–2023	Strictly Come Dancing: The Official Podcast	Co-presenter

== Awards and nominations ==
Year	Nominated	Award	Work	Result
2015	BBC Radio 1's Teen Awards	Best British Vlogger		Won
2016	Streamy Awards	Best International YouTube Channel	ThatcherJoe	Nominated
2019	Global Awards	Social Media Superstar		Won
2020	WhatsOnStage Awards	Best Supporting Actor In a Musical	Waitress	Nominated
