= Laid in America =

2016 film

- Theatrical release poster
- Directed by: Sam Milman; Peter Vass
- Written by: Sam Milman; Peter Vass
- Produced by: Max Gottlieb
- Starring: KSI; Caspar Lee; Bobby Lee; Madison Iseman; Josh Leyva; Angela Trimbur; Angela Kinsey; Gerry Bednob; Syd Wilder
- Edited by: Keith Croket
- Production company: The Fun Group LLC
- Distributed by: Universal Pictures Home Entertainment
- Release date: 26 September 2016
- Running time: 85 minutes
- Countries: United Kingdom; United States
- Language: English

Laid in America is a 2016 direct-to-video teen comedy film starring English YouTuber KSI and South African YouTuber Caspar Lee. The film was written and directed by Sam Milman and Peter Vass, and was produced by The Fun Group LLC and Max Gottlieb. The film was released direct-to-video by Universal Pictures Home Entertainment on 26 September 2016.

== Plot ==
Two foreign exchange students, named Duncan and Jack, adventure on their goal of getting laid in their last night in America. In Duncan's music class, he asks Tucker if they can go to his end of the year party. Tucker replies they must bring two hot girls to his party to get inside. Jack disapproves of this deal as he doesn't want his crush Kaylee to see him with another girl. Duncan and Jack get advice from Duncan's younger brother, Freddie, and download the Blindr app to get girls, they find a match with Amber and Violet; meeting at a restaurant 30 minutes later.

At the restaurant, Amber meets Duncan and Jack. She buys them drinks, drugging both of them when they are not paying attention; knocking them unconscious. She kidnaps the duo and brings them to her boyfriend Goose. Goose's mother walks in on them, and he lies about them being friends. Kaylee calls Jack; unaware that Jack does not have his phone. In response, Goose impersonates him and calls her out of her name simply to antagonize Jack. Goose takes both of his victims to an ATM. The man behind them talks trash for taking too long, and when Goose responds, the man knocks him out. Duncan steals Goose's car and gold watch; knocking out Amber and freeing Jack. Jack is furious with Duncan for hitting Amber and not getting their phones back since she was going to let them go.

They pull over so Jack can throw up, only for a man to come inside their car mistaking it for his Uber. He mentions he's going to "The Pleasure Palace" to have sex. Duncan wants to go to this place and are granted inside. Duncan is about to achieve his goal of getting laid until Jack walks in panicky, after being "molested" by his principal. The police shut down the Pleasure Palace while Duncan and Jack escape. On their way to the party, Duncan and Jack have an argument which ends their friendship.

Duncan is granted into the party by exchanging Goose's watch. Jack sneaks in through Tucker's bedroom window, inadvertently landing on Mr. Pickles, Tucker's cat. Tucker discovers Mr. Pickles dead while Jack hides in a closet. He finds Kaylee and tries talking to her, but she wants nothing to do with him because she mistakenly thinks he called her out of her name on the phone earlier. Duncan encounters Digby, who believes the best way to attract girls is by insulting them. Tucker confronts Jack when he tries speaking with Kaylee again. The ensuing altercation results in Tucker pushing Jack to the ground, causing a scene. Kaylee is angered further as she wanted to handle the situation herself; Tucker calls her out of her name and Jack angrily defends her. Tucker's friend, Topher, discovers Jack killed Mr. Pickles and shows video evidence on a video screen.

The party is interrupted by gunshots and Goose arrives, confronting Jack about his belongings. An enraged Tucker knocks Goose out for crashing his party before attempting to assault Jack. Duncan comes from behind and smashes a glass item over Tucker's head; knocking him out. Jack and Duncan reconcile, becoming friends again. Kaylee takes Jack to Tucker's room and tries to apologize for her behavior towards him earlier. Jack expresses his feelings with a kiss, telling her he accepts her apology, and they have sex. Duncan spots Scarlett, the girl he and Jack were getting sex lessons from in the beginning of the film, and she reveals she is Tucker's sister. Duncan immediately apologizes, but Scarlett reveals she is not mad at Duncan for hitting him; admitting Tucker deserved it. She offers to have sex with him because their earlier session was cut short, which he gladly accepts. Jack and Duncan arrive back home in the morning; packing their bags for the airport. Duncan reveals he took back his and Jack's phones from Goose after Tucker knocked him out. The movie ends with Jack and Duncan sadly parting.

In a mid-credits scene, Duncan and Scarlett are shown having sex in a video Duncan posted on his YouTube channel; it quickly becomes awkward while the video goes viral in comparison to his previous and unpopular Chill Challenge video.

== Cast ==
- Olajide Olatunji as Duncan
- Caspar Lee as Jack
- Bobby Lee as Goose
- Madison Iseman as Kaylee
- Josh Leyva as Tucker
- Angela Trimbur as Amber
- Angela Kinsey as Lisa
- Melissa Villaseñor as Ms. Hopkins
- Gerry Bednob as Principal Raheem
- Syd Wilder as Scarlett
- Heather Cowles as Tabitha
- Gabbie Hanna as Lindsey
- Deji Olatunji as Freddie
- Tay Zonday as Digby
- Jason Horton as Lance
- Bart Baker as Blindr Host
