= Caroline Pearce =

English athlete and sports presenter

Personal information
- Born: 1 September 1981 (age 45) Cambridge, Cambridgeshire, England
- Occupations: Athlete; presenter; reporter

Sport
- Sport: Athletics
- Event: heptathlon

Caroline Pearce (born 1 September 1981) is an English former athlete. She is a presenter for BT Sport and a reporter for Fox Sports and UFC Fight Pass. Pearce played the character Ice in Sky One's version of Gladiators.

== Biography ==
=== Athletics career ===
Pearce competed for England in the World Pentathlon Championships at the age of 15. Pearce became the British heptathlon champion after winning the British AAA Championships title at the 2002 AAA Championships and 2004 AAA Championships.

Pearce competed in the 2004 European Cup heptathlon finals and represented Great Britain as a bobsledder in the 2005 World Bobsleigh Championships.

=== TV career ===
In 2008, Pearce was chosen to compete as a gladiator in Sky One's relaunch of the TV series Gladiators under the gladiator name "Ice", but she left the show after the first season. Pearce has also appeared on The Friday Night Project as the "Coat of Cash wearing Celebrity". She is currently signed to MVE Management.

In 2013, Pearce joined BT Sport (now named TNT Sports) where she is a reporter and presenter for boxing and UFC. She reported at Fury v Wilder 1, Fury v Wilder 3, Canelo v GGG, and presents ‘UFC: Beyond The Octagon'.
