= Dianne Buswell =

Australian ballroom dancer (born 1989)

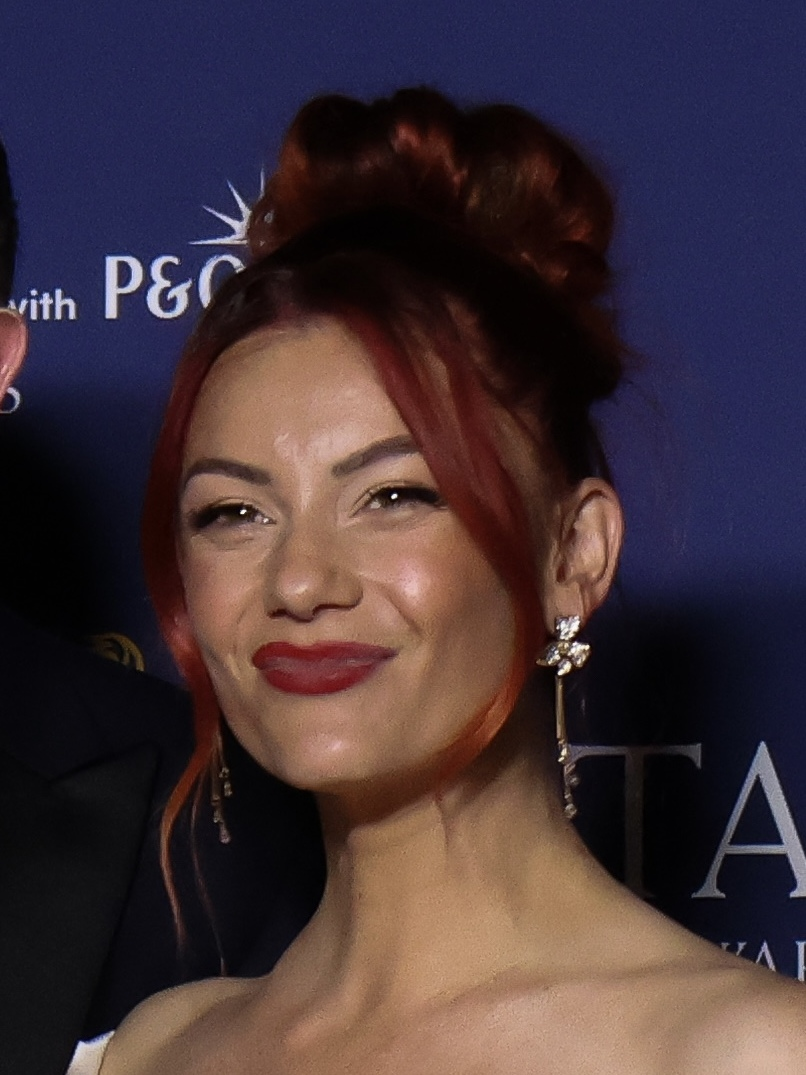
- Buswell in 2026
- Born: Dianne Claire Buswell; 6 May 1989 (age 37); Bunbury, Western Australia, Australia
- Occupation: Dancer
- Years active: 2011–present
- Partner: Joe Sugg (2018–present)
- Children: 1

YouTube information
- Channel: Dianne Buswell
- Years active: 2019–present
- Genres: Vlogs; lifestyle
- Subscribers: 302 thousand
- Views: 54 million
- Last updated: 23 August 2026

Dianne Claire Buswell (born 6 May 1989) is an Australian professional dancer who is best known for her appearances on the British television show Strictly Come Dancing. After competing on Dancing with the Stars in Australia, she joined the British series in 2017, reaching the final in 2018 with Joe Sugg and in 2023 with Bobby Brazier, before winning the contest with Chris McCausland in 2024, for which she also won a BAFTA award in 2025.

== Career ==
Buswell is a former Australian Open champion and four-time Amateur Australian Open finalist. She and her brother Andrew Buswell were Western Australian Open Adult New Vogue champions for 2008 and 2010. She also appeared on So You Think You Can Dance Australia.

Buswell turned professional at the age of 21 when she joined the touring dance company Burn the Floor in January 2011.

=== Dancing with the Stars ===
In 2015, she was a professional dancer on the fifteenth season of Australia's Dancing with the Stars, paired with AFL star Jude Bolton; they were the fifth couple eliminated.

Season	Partner	Place
15	Jude Bolton	7th

==== Season 15 ====
Celebrity partner: Jude Bolton

Week	Dance	Music	Judges' scores (Note: Individual judges' scores are listed in the following order: Todd McKenney, Helen Richey, Kym Johnson.)			Total score	Result
1	Cha-cha-cha	"Uptown Funk"	5	5	6	21 (Note: Bruno Tonioli was a guest judge during week 1, and awarded the pair a 5.)	No Elimination
2	Paso doble	"Best of You"	8	8	8	32 (Note: Bruno Tonioli was also guest judge during week 2, and awarded the pair an 8.)	Safe
3	Samba	"Magalenha"	7	7	7	28 (Note: Once again, Bruno Tonioli was a guest judge during week 3, and awarded the pair a 7.)	Safe
4	Tango	"Geronimo"	7	8	8	23	Safe
5	Viennese waltz	"Powerful"	6	6	6	18	Eliminated

=== Strictly Come Dancing ===
Buswell moved to the United Kingdom, where she joined the BBC's Strictly Come Dancing – the original version of Dancing with the Stars – in 2017. Her celebrity partner for the 2017 series was the Reverend Richard Coles. They were the second couple eliminated in the series, losing the dance-off to Simon Rimmer and Karen Hauer in a unanimous decision. Buswell was paired with television presenter Tim Vincent for the 2017 Children in Need special.

For the sixteenth series of the show in 2018, she was partnered with YouTuber Joe Sugg. They were runners-up, alongside Faye Tozer and Giovanni Pernice and Ashley Roberts and Pasha Kovalev, behind Stacey Dooley and Kevin Clifton. In early 2019, the couple performed in the Strictly Come Dancing Live! tour, winning 28 of the 29 shows.

Buswell returned for her third series in 2019, paired with radio DJ Dev Griffin. They were the third couple to leave the show, after losing a dance-off to Emma Weymouth and Aljaž Skorjanec.

For series 18 in 2020, she was partnered with The Wanted singer, Max George. They were the third couple to be eliminated, after losing a dance-off to Maisie Smith and Gorka Marquez.

Buswell returned for series 19 in 2021, partnered with Robert Webb, a comedian, actor and writer. Webb withdrew from the competition after three weeks, due to ill health.

In 2022, she was paired with radio and television presenter Tyler West for series 20. They were the eighth couple to be eliminated after losing a dance-off to Molly Rainford and Carlos Gu.

In 2023, she was paired with actor and model Bobby Brazier for series 21. They finished as runners-up, alongside Layton Williams and Nikita Kuzmin, behind series champions Ellie Leach and Vito Coppola.

In 2024, she was paired with comedian Chris McCausland for series 22. They won the series, with Buswell winning for the first time and McCausland becoming the first blind contestant to win. In May 2025, the couple's waltz – which featured a passage of McCausland walking unaided and unsighted – won the British Academy Television Award for Memorable Moment at the 2025 British Academy Television Awards.

For the series 23 in 2025, she was partnered with Neighbours actor Stefan Dennis and announced she would compete despite her pregnancy, which was announced on 14 September. It was reported that there was a chance she could pull out of the competition and be replaced by one of the other professional dancers. However, the couple finished in 12th place after Dennis tore his calf muscle, forcing them to withdraw from the competition after four weeks.

Series	Partner	Place	Average Score
15	Reverend Richard Coles	14th	16.0
16	Joe Sugg	2nd	32.8
17	Dev Griffin	13th	30.0
18	Max George	9th	27.3
19	Robert Webb	13th	24.0
20	Tyler West	8th	32.2
21	Bobby Brazier	2nd	33.8
22	Chris McCausland	1st	32.6
23	Stefan Dennis	12th	21.7
24	Will Best	9th	26.5

Colour key:

Winners
Runners-up
Withdrew

Highest and lowest scoring per dance

Dance	Partner	Highest	Partner	Lowest
American Smooth	Chris McCausland	37	Reverend Richard Coles	17
Argentine Tango	Joe Sugg; Bobby Brazier	30		
Cha-Cha-Cha	Tyler West	35	Reverend Richard Coles; Stefan Dennis	17
Charleston	Joe Sugg; Tyler West	38	Stefan Dennis	26
Couple's Choice	Bobby Brazier	39	Max George	32
Dance-a-Thon	Joe Sugg	5	Chris McCausland	1
Foxtrot	Joe Sugg	35	Will Best	19
Jive	Bobby Brazier	35	Joe Sugg; Dev Griffin; Max George	27
Paso Doble	Joe Sugg	39	Reverend Richard Coles	14
Quickstep	Joe Sugg; Bobby Brazier	38	Robert Webb	25
Rumba				
Salsa	Joe Sugg	36	Chris McCausland	30
Samba	Bobby Brazier	39	Will Best	18
Showdance	Joe Sugg; Bobby Brazier	39	Chris McCausland	38
Tango	Tyler West	32	Max George	23
Viennese Waltz	Chris McCausland	36	Joe Sugg; Tyler West	29
Waltz	Chris McCausland	40	Will Best	25

Color key:

Winners
Runners-up
Withdrew
- Green number indicates when Dianne and her partner were at the top of the leaderboard.
- Red number indicates when Dianne and her partner were at the bottom of the leaderboard.

==== Series 15 ====
Celebrity partner: Richard Coles

Week	Dance	Music	Judges' scores (Note: Individual judges' scores are listed in the following order: Craig Revel Horwood, Darcey Bussell, Shirley Ballas, Bruno Tonioli.)				Total score	Result
1	Cha-cha-cha	"There Must Be an Angel (Playing with My Heart)"	2	4	6	5	17	No Elimination
2	American Smooth	"Love Really Hurts Without You"	3	4	5	5	17	Safe
3	Paso doble	"Flash's Theme"	2	4	4	4	14	Eliminated

==== Series 16 ====
Celebrity partner: Joe Sugg

Week	Dance	Music	Judges' scores (Note: Individual judges' scores are listed in the following order: Craig Revel Horwood, Darcey Bussell, Shirley Ballas, Bruno Tonioli.)				Total score	Result
1	Jive	"Take On Me"	6	7	7	7	27	No Elimination
2	Charleston	"Cotton Eye Joe"	7	8	8	8	31	Safe
3	American Smooth	"Breaking Free"	6	7	6	7	26	Safe
4	Cha-cha-cha	"Just Got Paid"	5	7	7	7	26	Safe
5	Waltz	"Rainbow Connection"	6	7	8	8 (Note: Alfonso Ribeiro filled in for Bruno Tonioli in Week 5.)	29	Safe
6	Foxtrot	"Youngblood"	8	9	9	9	35	Safe
7	Paso doble	"Pompeii"	7	9	9	9	34	Safe
8	Samba	"MMMBop"	7	8	8	9	32	Safe
9	Quickstep	"Dancin' Fool"	8	10	10	10	38	Safe
10	Street	"Jump Around"	7	8	10	10	35	Safe
11	Salsa	"Joseph Megamix"	8	9	9	10	36	Safe
12	Viennese waltz Argentine tango	"This Year's Love" "Red Right Hand"	6; 6	8; 8	7; 8	8; 8	29; 30	Safe
13	Paso doble Showdance; Charleston	"Pompeii" "I Bet You Look Good on the Dancefloor" "Cotton Eye Joe"	9; 9; 9	10; 10; 9	10; 10; 10	10; 10; 10	39; 39; 38	Runners-up

==== Series 17 ====
Celebrity partner: Dev Griffin

Week	Dance	Music	Judges' scores (Note: Individual judges' scores are listed in the following order: Craig Revel Horwood, Motsi Mabuse, Shirley Ballas, Bruno Tonioli.)				Total score	Result
1	Foxtrot	"Build Me Up Buttercup"	7	7	8	8	30	No Elimination
2	Jive	"Dance with Me Tonight"	6	7	7	7	27	Safe
3	Street	"Friend Like Me"	9	9	9	9	36	Safe
4	Cha-cha-cha	"Dancing with a Stranger"	6	7	7	7	27	Eliminated

==== Series 18 ====
Celebrity partner: Max George

Week	Dance	Music	Judges' scores (Note: Individual judges' scores are listed in the following order: Craig Revel Horwood, Shirley Ballas, Motsi Mabuse)			Total score	Result
1	Tango	"Best Fake Smile"	6	5	6	17	No Elimination
2	Jive	"I'm a Believer"	6	7	7	20	Safe
3	Couple's Choice	"The Simpsons Theme"	8	8	8	24	Safe
4	American Smooth	"It Had to Be You"	5	7	8 (Note: Anton Du Beke filled in for Motsi Mabuse in Week 4.)	20	Eliminated

==== Series 19 ====
Celebrity partner: Robert Webb

Week	Dance	Music	Judges' scores (Note: Individual judges' scores are listed in the following order: Craig Revel Horwood, Motsi Mabuse, Shirley Ballas, Anton Du Beke.)				Total score	Result
1	Cha-cha-cha	"Rasputin (song)"	6	4	4	6	20	No Elimination
2	Tango	"La cumparsita"	7	7	6	7	27	Safe
3	Quickstep	"The Muppet Show Theme"	6	6	7	6	25	Safe
4	-	-	-	-	-	-	-	Withdrew (Note: Robert Webb withdrew from series 19 during week 4 for health reasons, thus the couple effectively finished in 13th place.)

==== Series 20 ====
Celebrity partner: Tyler West

Week	Dance	Music	Judges' scores (Note: Individual judges' scores are listed in the following order: Craig Revel Horwood, Motsi Mabuse, Shirley Ballas, Anton Du Beke.)				Total score	Result
1	American Smooth	"Falling"	4	5	7	6	22	No Elimination
2	Jive	"Hit the Road Jack"	7	8	8	8	31	Safe
3	Charleston	"Flash, Bang, Wallop"	9	10	10	9	38	Safe
4	Couple's Choice	"Garage Megamix"	8	9	10	10	37	Safe
5	Tango	"Doctor Who Theme"	8	8	8	8	32	Safe
6	Cha-cha-cha	"Day-O (The Banana Boat Song)"	7	9	9	10	35	Safe
7	Viennese waltz	"I've Been Loving You Too Long"	7	7	7	8	29	Safe
8	Paso doble	"Unstoppable"	6	8	8	9	31	Bottom two (Note: Tony Adams and Katya Jones were announced as the other couple in the bottom two. However, they did not compete in the dance-off due to Adams sustaining a hamstring injury, subsequently leading him to withdraw from the competition, and West to automatically advance to the next round.)
9	Salsa	"KC & The Sunshine Band mix"	8	9	9	9	35	Eliminated

==== Series 21 ====
Celebrity partner: Bobby Brazier

Week	Dance	Music	Judges' scores (Note: Individual judges' scores are listed in the following order: Craig Revel Horwood, Motsi Mabuse, Shirley Ballas, Anton Du Beke.)				Total score	Result
1	Foxtrot	"All About You"	6	7	8	8	29	No Elimination
2	Charleston	"Do Your Thing"	7	7	7	8	29	Safe
3	Samba	"Young Hearts Run Free"	8	8	8	8	32	Safe
4	Tango	"Fashion"	7	7	8	8	30	Safe
5	Viennese waltz	"Golden Hour"	7	8	8	9	32	Safe
6	Cha-cha-cha	"Come On-a My House"	6	9	7	8	30	Safe
7	Argentine tango	"Sail"	6	8	8	8	30	Safe
8	American Smooth	"Ghost of You"	7	8	8	9	32	Safe
9	Jive	"Wake Me Up Before You Go-Go"	8	9	9	9	35	Bottom two
10	Couple's Choice	"This Woman's Work"	8	9	10	10	37	Safe
11	Salsa	"(I've Had) The Time Of My Life"	8	8	9	9	34	No Elimination
12	Quickstep; Paso doble	"Mack the Knife" "Run Boy Run"	9; 8	9; 9	10; 9	10; 9	38; 35	Bottom two
13	Samba; Showdance; Couple's Choice	"Young Hearts Run Free" "La La Land medley" "This Woman's Work"	9; 9; 9	10; 10; 10	10; 10; 10	10; 10; 10	39; 39; 39	Runners-up

==== Series 22 ====
Celebrity partner: Chris McCausland

Week	Dance	Music	Judges' scores (Note: Individual judges' scores are listed in the following order: Craig Revel Horwood, Motsi Mabuse, Shirley Ballas, Anton Du Beke.)				Total score	Result
1	Cha-cha-cha	"Twist and Shout"	4	6	6	7	23	No Elimination
2	Foxtrot	"Be Young, Be Foolish, Be Happy"	6	7	8	8	29	Safe
3	Jive	"Wayne's World Theme"	7	7	8	8	30	Safe
4	Salsa	"Down Under"	6	8	8	8	30	Safe
5	Waltz	"You'll Never Walk Alone"	8	9	9	9	35	Safe
6	Samba	"Stayin' Alive"	5	7	7	7	26	Safe
7	Tango	"Rock and Roll All Nite"	6	7	8	8	29	Safe
8	Couple's Choice	"Instant Karma!"	7	8	9	9	33	Safe
9	American Smooth	"Jump"	8	9	10	10	37	Safe
10	Paso doble Samba-thon	"El gato montés" "Conga" & "La Vida Es Un Carnaval"	7	8	9	9	34 (Note: Chris and Dianne were awarded one extra point after coming seventh in the Samba-a-thon.)	Safe
11	Quickstep	"You're the Top"	7	8	8	9	32	Safe
12	Charleston; Viennese waltz	"When You're Smiling" "Nothing Else Matters"	7; 9	8; 9	9; 9	9; 9	33; 36	Safe
13	Couple's Choice; Showdance; Waltz	"Instant Karma!" "You Get What You Give" "You'll Never Walk Alone"	8; 8; 10	10; 10; 10	10; 10; 10	10; 10; 10	38; 38; 40	Winners

==== Series 23 ====
Celebrity partner: Stefan Dennis

Week	Dance	Music	Judges' scores (Note: Individual judges' scores are listed in the following order: Craig Revel Horwood, Motsi Mabuse, Shirley Ballas, Anton Du Beke.)				Total score	Result
1	Foxtrot	"Neighbours Theme"	4	6	6	6	22	No Elimination
2	Cha-cha-cha	"Give It Up"	4	4	4	5	17	Safe
3	Waltz	"It Is You (I Have Loved)"	-	-	-	-	-	Given bye (Note: Due to illness Stefan was unable to perform in Week 3, and was given a bye to Week 4 as per the rules of the show.)
4	Charleston	"Dance Monkey"	5	7	7	7	26	Safe
5	-	"Livin' on a Prayer"	-	-	-	-	-	Withdrew (Note: Stefan Dennis withdrew from the competition before Week 5 after sustaining an injury in rehearsals, effectively finishing the couple in 12th place.)

Series 24

Celebrity dancer: Will Best

Week	Dance	Music	Judges' scores				Total score	Result
1	Samba	"Rock DJ"	4	5	4	5	18	No Elimination
2	Foxtrot	"Old Time Rock and Roll"	4	5	5	5	19	Safe
3	Waltz	"With You I'm Born Again"	6	6	6	7	25	Safe
4	Jive	"Crocodile Rock"	7	8	8	8	31	Safe
5	Cha-cha-cha	"Daddy"	7	8	8	8	31	Safe
6	Couples' Choice	"Nu Flow"	8	8	8	8	32	Safe
7	Quickstep	"This Love"	6	8	7	8	29	Safe
8	Paso Doble	"Smalltown Boy"	6	7	7	7	27	Eliminated

==== Christmas Specials ====
Celebrity partners: Robbie Savage (2017), Joe Sugg (2019), Fred Sirieix (2021)

Year	Dance	Music	Judges' scores (Note: For 2017, individual judges' scores are listed in the following order: Craig Revel Horwood, Darcey Bussell, Shirley Ballas, Bruno Tonioli.) (Note: For 2019, individual judges' scores are listed in the following order: Craig Revel Horwood, Motsi Mabuse, Shirley Ballas, Bruno Tonioli.) (Note: For 2021, individual judges' scores are listed in the following order: Craig Revel Horwood, Motsi Mabuse, Shirley Ballas, Anton Du Beke.)				Total score	Result
2017	American Smooth	"Christmas (Baby Please Come Home)"	7	8	8	8	31	Participant
2019	Street/Commercial	"Sleigh Ride"	10	10	10	10	40	Participant
2021	Quickstep	"Merry Christmas Everyone"	8	10	10	10	38	Participant

=== YouTube and other media work ===
Buswell started a YouTube channel in March 2019, where she posts regular vlogs showing her viewers what she does in her day-to-day life. In December of that year, she was named as the UK's most-subscribed new YouTuber of 2019, having gained almost 230,000 subscribers.

Before becoming a professional dancer, Buswell was a hairdresser, and in 2021, she had a podcast with BBC Sounds called 'Di's Salon', in which she chatted to guests as they looked back at the hairstyles they have had over the years.

In 2022, Buswell participated in the reality series Freeze the Fear with Wim Hof on BBC One.

In January 2025, Buswell and her Strictly partner Chris McCausland began a podcast called Winning Isn't Everything.

In January 2026, Buswell and Joe Sugg announced they were producing and co-hosting a TV show together titled Raiders of the Lost Crafts for Sky History, where they travel around the UK trying traditional crafts.

== Filmography ==
=== Television ===
Year	Title	Role	Notes
2015	Dancing with the Stars (Australia)	Professional Dancer	
2017–present	Strictly Come Dancing	Professional Dancer	
2022	Freeze the Fear with Wim Hof	Contestant	
TBA	Raiders of the Lost Crafts	Co-host	With Joe Sugg

=== Stage ===
Year	Title	Role	Venue
2011–2014	Burn The Floor	Dancer	Touring
2019	Here Come the Girls	Dancer	UK Touring
2019, 2022–2024	Strictly The Professionals	Dancer	UK Touring
2025	Dianne & Vito: Red Hot and Ready	Dancer	UK Touring
2027	Dianne & Vito: Back in Business	Dancer	UK Touring

=== Podcast ===
Year	Title	Role
2021	Di's Salon	Host
2025	Winning Isn't Everything	Co-host with Chris McCausland

== Personal life ==
Buswell was born in Bunbury, Western Australia. She began dancing at age 5, and went on to compete from an early age in State, National and International Ballroom and Latin events. She has two older brothers.

Buswell dated soap actor Anthony Quinlan from late 2017 to October 2018.

In late 2018, Buswell began dating Joe Sugg, her celebrity partner from Strictly Come Dancing. The couple confirmed that they were living together in August 2019. In February 2021 they revealed that they had bought a house together. Their son Bowden was born in March 2026 through emergency C-section.
