= Rhys Stephenson =

British television presenter and actor (born 1993)

- Born: Rhys D'Angelo Stephenson; 29 October 1993 (age 32); Lewisham, London, England
- Occupations: Television presenter; actor
- Years active: 2013–present
- Spouse: Beth Johnson (m. 2024)

Rhys Stephenson (born 29 October 1993) is an English television presenter and actor.

== Early life ==
Stephenson was born in Lewisham, London. He began starring in school theatre productions at the age of ten. He attended Oasis Academy Pinewood and later Bower Park Academy and the University of Westminster.

== Career ==
In 2013, Stephenson joined the National Youth Theatre. He has acted in a number of shows with the Sydenham Arts Festival and has appeared in productions including Alice in Wonderland and At the Feet of Jesus.

In 2013, Stephenson started his presenting career during his time at the University of Westminster when he began working with his university’s channel, the student television station Smoke TV for which he won a National Student Television Association (NaSTA) award for best on-screen male. In 2016, Stephenson became a presenter on CBBC. He has since presented Blue Peter and Saturday Mash-Up! and appeared on the Dengineers, Remotely Funny and Newsround.

Stephenson is an ambassador for children's mental health charity, Place2Be.

In August 2021, Stephenson was announced on Newsround as a contestant on the nineteenth series of Strictly Come Dancing. It was then revealed on 18 September that his professional dancing partner would be Nancy Xu. He took a subsequent break from his presenting duties to compete. The couple left in the semi-final, coming 4th in the competition. The couple had topped the leader-board twice, once with the Charleston and once with the Argentine tango, but were also in the dance-off four times. On the fourth of these times they were eliminated by The Great British Bake Off winner John Whaite and his dance partner Johannes Radebe.

== Personal life ==
On 16 June 2024 Stephenson married Bethany Johnson.

He presented on CBBC between 2016 and 2025, when live links closed. He is currently signed to MVE Management.
