= Caspar Lee =

British-South African YouTuber (born 1994)

- Lee in 2022
- Born: Caspar Richard George Lee; 24 April 1994 (age 32); London, England
- Occupations: Internet personality; businessman
- Years active: 2012–present
- Spouse: Ambar Driscoll (m. 2025)

YouTube information
- Channel: Caspar
- Genres: Vlog; comedy
- Subscribers: 6.50 million (main); 1.59 million (more)
- Views: 486.23 million (main); 3.73 million (more)
- Last updated: 19 July 2025

Caspar Richard George Lee (born 24 April 1994) is a British-South African YouTuber and investor. He was featured in Forbes 30 Under 30 in 2020 for his work in media and advertising.

== Career ==
Lee started his YouTube channel 'dicasp' in 2011, and later renamed it 'Caspar'. Lee was part of the 'YouTube Boyband' that raised money in 2014 for Comic Relief. He was named by Yahoo! News as one of "12 Web-savvy entrepreneurs to watch" in December 2013. He collaborated with Lisa Kudrow in two episodes of Web Therapy (2014).

Lee played Garlic in the 2014 comedy movie, Spud 3: Learning to Fly, with John Cleese and Troye Sivan. Lee and Joe Sugg appeared in a 2015 travel documentary, Joe and Caspar Hit the Road, and its sequel Joe and Caspar Hit The Road: USA, produced for BBC Worldwide. Also in 2016, Lee starred in Laid in America alongside YouTube comedian KSI (Olajide Olatunji). Lee appeared in the music video for Charli XCX's 2017 single, "Boys".

In August 2017, Lee was named "Chief Vision Officer" of Influencer Ltd, a British influencer marketing agency. Caspar Lee, a biography written by Lee and his mother, Emily, was published in hardcover in May 2016. Lee also co-founded Margravine Management with Joe Sugg, now known as MVE.

In May 2020, Lee co-founded Proper Living, a South African student accommodation company.

In 2022, Lee launched Creator Ventures with former private equity investor cousin Sasha Kaletsky. Their venture capital fund raised $20m to finance early-stage, consumer-internet startups.

== Personal life ==
Born in London, Lee is the son of TV commercial producers Emily Lee (née Murphy, b. 1956) and Jonathan Lee (b. 1955). Lee's older sister, Theodora Lee (b. 1991), is an author and advertisement creator. The family emigrated to South Africa in 1996. Lee was raised in Knysna and Durban, where he attended Crawford College, La Lucia. When Lee was younger he was diagnosed with Tourette's Syndrome. In 2013, Lee moved from South Africa to live with YouTuber Alfie Deyes. In 2014, Lee moved into a London apartment with fellow YouTuber Joe Sugg. In 2016, he moved into an apartment with Josh Pieters, who is also a YouTuber. Lee became engaged to Ambar Driscoll in 2022, and the couple married in 2025.

== Filmography ==
=== Film ===
Year	Title	Role	Notes
2014	Spud 3: Learning to Fly	Garlic	
2015	The SpongeBob Movie: Sponge Out of Water	Seagull	Voice role (UK version)
2015	Joe and Caspar Hit the Road	Himself	Documentary
2016	Joe and Caspar Hit the Road USA	Himself	Documentary
2016	Laid in America	Jack	
2019	Wonder Park	Cooper	Voice role (UK version)

=== Television ===
Year	Title	Role	Notes
2014	Web Therapy	Himself (fictional)	2 episodes
2019	Celebrity Mastermind	Contestant	Episode 31 in December 2019
2025	Pointless Celebrities	Contestant	Episode 21 in August 2025

=== Web series ===
Year	Title	Role	Notes
2014	Web Therapy	Himself (fictional)	2 episodes

=== Music videos ===
Year	Title	Artist(s)	Role	Ref.
2016	"Friends with Benefits"	KSI feat. MDMN	Himself	
2017	"Boys"	Charli XCX	Himself	
2019	"Real Name"	KSI, Randolph, Talia Mar	Wedding guest	

== Awards ==
Lee won "Social Media Superstar" at the 2018 Global Awards.
