= Joe and Caspar Hit the Road =

- Directed by: Brian Klein
- Produced by: Ian Brown
- Starring: Joe Sugg; Caspar Lee
- Cinematography: Iain May; Phil Piotrowsky
- Edited by: Chris Denton; Joe Orr; Andy Turner
- Production companies: Gleam Futures; Oyster Productions; Raucous Productions
- Distributed by: BBC Worldwide
- Release date: 23 November 2015
- Running time: 88 minutes
- Country: United Kingdom
- Language: English

Joe and Caspar Hit the Road is a 2015 British comedy documentary film directed by Brian Klein and starring British YouTubers Caspar Lee and Joe Sugg.

The film follows Lee and Sugg (playing fictionalised versions of themselves) going on a road trip around Europe without any electronics or money. The couple take up a number of jobs, including learning to be gondoliers in Venice, working as deckhands on a super yacht in Antibes, working at Italian football club AC Milan and performing on Barcelona's Las Ramblas.

== Release ==
Distribution rights to the film were held by BBC Worldwide. The film had its red carpet premiere in their home country, the United Kingdom, at the Empire, Leicester Square on 22 November 2015, a day before it was released on DVD in selected countries. The film was also available on Amazon, iTunes, and Tesco.

The film was also shown on British television channel E4, in two parts on 25 April and 1 May 2016.

== Sequel ==
A sequel Joe & Caspar Hit the Road USA was released to DVD in November 2016.
