= Janette Manrara =

American dancer (born 1983)

- Born: 16 November 1983 (age 42); Miami, Florida, U.S.
- Occupations: Presenter, professional dancer, actress, choreographer and author
- Years active: 1995–present
- Spouse: Aljaž Škorjanec (m. 2017)
- Children: 1

Janette Manrara Škorjanec (born November 16, 1983) is an American professional dancer and television presenter. She is best known for her appearances on the US series So You Think You Can Dance and British dance reality television competition, Strictly Come Dancing (the original version of Dancing with the Stars). She is married to Slovenian dancer and co-star Aljaž Škorjanec. In June 2021, she quit being a dancer to co host Strictly Come Dancing: It Takes Two with Rylan Clark, and later Fleur East.

== Early life ==
Manrara is from Miami, Florida, US. Born to Cuban parents, Luis and Maritza, Janette is the oldest of three children. Originally a singer, learning from her Cuban family, she formally studied dance from the age of 19. She began performing in musical theatre at age 12, and started her formal dance training at 19, studying ballroom, ballet, pointe, jazz and hip-hop. Manrara studied finance at Florida International University, and worked in a bank for seven years, as a senior loan processor; this was while she was completing her dance training in Ballroom, Ballet, Pointe, Jazz, Hip Hop, and Salsa.

== So You Think You Can Dance ==
Manrara made it through her audition to be selected for season 5, where she was paired with Brandon Bryant. During their time on the show, Janette received much praise from the judges; both Mia Michaels and Nigel Lythgoe said Janette was their favorite female dancer that season and Lythgoe went on to say he hoped she would win the entire competition. However, she was eliminated during week 7 along with contemporary contestant Jason Glover.

During the show's eighth season, Manrara returned as an All Star to perform a Paso Doble with contestant Marko Germar.

== Strictly Come Dancing and It Takes Two ==
Highest and lowest scoring performances per dance

Dance	Partner	Highest	Partner	Lowest
American Smooth	HRVY	40	Dr.Ranj Singh	25
Argentine Tango	Jake Wood	29		
Cha Cha Cha	Aston Merrygold	35	Julien Macdonald	20
Charleston	HRVY	40	Jake Wood; Peter Andre	38
Dance-A-Thon			Jake Wood; Peter Andre	1
Couples Choice	HRVY	40	Will Bayley	32
Foxtrot	Aston Merrygold	31	Will Bayley	24
Jive	HRVY	39	Dr.Ranj Singh	20
Paso Doble	Aston Merrygold	38	Will Bayley	23
Quickstep	Aston Merrygold	32	Dr. Ranj Singh	20
Rumba	HRVY	31	Jake Wood	27
Salsa	HRVY	36	Julien Macdonald	23
Samba	Jake Wood	38	Dr.Ranj Singh	27
Showdance	HRVY	39	-	-
Tango	HRVY	35	Julien Macdonald	18
Viennese Waltz	Peter Andre	34	Aston Merrygold	25
Waltz	Jake Wood; Aston Merrygold	32	-	-

In 2013 Manrara became a professional dancer on British TV show Strictly Come Dancing. Her first celebrity partner in the 11th series was fashion designer Julien Macdonald; they were the third couple to be eliminated. She returned for the 12th series and partnered actor Jake Wood, with whom she made it to the Semi-Finals and finished in 5th place overall. For the 13th series, she was paired with TV personality Peter Andre; they were the 9th couple to be eliminated.

Manrara has also taken part in one-off specials of the show: In 2013 she performed a Quickstep with actor Ricky Norwood on the Christmas special. In 2014 Manrara scored a maximum of 40 points in 'The People's Strictly for Comic Relief' for an American Smooth with, 'Kidz R us' founder, Phillip Barnett. Manrara took part in the 2016 'Strictly Come dancing Live tour' with her series 12 partner Jake Wood. For series 14, she was partnered with radio DJ Melvin Odoom, and were the first couple to be eliminated after receiving the fewest public votes. Odoom and Manrara reprised their partnership in the 2016 Christmas special, she also danced with canoeist Joe Clarke in the 2016 Children in Need special. For series 15, she was partnered with former JLS singer Aston Merrygold. They were the sixth couple eliminated in week 7, losing the dance-off to Mollie King and her partner AJ Pritchard. For series 16, she was partnered with children's television and This Morning doctor Dr. Ranj Singh. They were the sixth couple to be eliminated. During her seventh series on the show, in 2019, she was partnered with paralympian, Will Bayley. They had to withdraw from the competition on week 7, after Will sustained a knee injury in rehearsals the previous week. For her eighth series, she was partnered with pop singer, HRVY, and made the earliest perfect score for their Street/Commercial routine in week 6. They reached the final, her first final, and they were runners-up.

On 10 June 2021, it was announced that Manrara would become the new presenter of Strictly Come Dancing: It Takes Two, taking over from Zoe Ball who stepped down from the series earlier in the year. Manrara therefore did not continue as a professional dancer on the show.

Series	Partner	Place	Average score
11	Julien Macdonald	13th	20.8
12	Jake Wood	5th	32.1
13	Peter Andre	7th	30.8
14	Melvin Odoom	15th	22.5
15	Aston Merrygold	10th	32.1
16	Dr. Ranj Singh	10th	24.3
17	Will Bayley	10th	25.8
18	HRVY	2nd	35.9

=== Strictly Come Dancing performances ===
==== Series 11 ====
For series 11, Manrara was paired with Julien Macdonald.

Week No.	Dance/Song	Judges' score				Total	Result
Week No.	Dance/Song	Horwood	Bussell	Goodman	Tonioli	Total	Result
1	Cha-cha-cha / "Vogue"	3	5	6	6	20	No elimination
2	Tango / "Applause"	3	5	5	5	18	Bottom two
3	Jive / "Everybody Needs Somebody to Love"	4	5	7	6	22	Bottom two
4	Salsa / "Spice Up Your Life"	4	6	7	6	23	Eliminated

==== Series 12 ====
For series 12, Manrara was paired with Jake Wood.

Week No.	Dance/Song	Judges' score				Total	Result
Week No.	Dance/Song	Horwood	Bussell	Goodman	Tonioli	Total	Result
1	Tango / "Toxic"	7	7	7	7	28	No elimination
2	Salsa / "Mambo No.5"	8	9	9	9	35	Safe
3	Waltz / "The Godfather Waltz"	8	8	8	8	*40	Safe
4	Jive / "All Shook Up"	8	9	8	8	33	Safe
5	Quickstep / "I'm Still Standing"	7	8	8	8	31	Safe
6	Paso Doble / "Black Betty"	6	7	8	8	29	Safe
7	Rumba / "Strangers in the Night"	6	7	7	7	27	Safe
8	American Smooth / "Feeling Good"	9	9	9	9	36	Safe
9	Samba / "Macarena"	9	10	10	9	38	Safe
10	Argentine Tango / "Zorbas"	5	8	8	8	29	Safe
11	Charleston / "Entrance of the Gladiators"	9	9	10	10	38	Safe
11	Waltz-a-thon / "The Last Waltz"	Awarded	1	extra	point	39	Safe
12	Cha-cha-cha / "Boogie Shoes"	6	8	8	8	30	Eliminated
12	Viennese Waltz / "When a Man Loves a Woman"	7	8	8	8	31	Eliminated

*In week three Guest Judge, Donny Osmond, gave Jake and Janette 8 extra points

==== Series 13 ====
For series 13, Manrara was paired with Peter Andre.

Week No.	Dance/Song	Judges' score				Total	Result
Week No.	Dance/Song	Horwood	Bussell	Goodman	Tonioli	Total	Result
1	Cha-cha-cha / "Ain't No Other Man"	7	8	8	7	30	No elimination
2	Quickstep / "Valerie"	7	8	7	8	30	Safe
3	Paso Doble / "He's a Pirate"	7	7	7	7	28	Safe
4	Tango / "Blue Monday"	8	8	8	8	32	Safe
5	Rumba / "Thinking Out Loud"	7	7	8	7	29	Safe
6	Foxtrot / "Ghost"	7	7	7	7	28	Safe
7	Charleston / "Do Your Thing	9	10	10	9	38	Safe
8	Viennese Waltz / "You're My World"	8	9	8	9	34	Safe
9	Jive / "River Deep, Mountain High"	6	7	8	8	29	Bottom two
10	American Smooth / "I Get the Sweetest Feeling"	7	8	8	8	31	Eliminated
10	Quickstep-a-thon / "Sing, Sing, Sing"	Awarded	1	extra	point	32	Eliminated

==== Series 14 ====
For series 14, Manrara was paired with Melvin Odoom.

Week No.	Dance/Song	Judges' score				Total	Result
Week No.	Dance/Song	Horwood	Bussell	Goodman	Tonioli	Total	Result
1	Cha-cha-cha / "Loco in Acapulco"	4	6	6	6	22	No elimination
2	Tango / "Moving on Up"	5	6	6	6	23	Eliminated

==== Series 15 ====
For series 15, Manrara was paired with Aston Merrygold.

Week No.	Dance/Song	Judges' score				Total	Result
Week No.	Dance/Song	Horwood	Bussell	Ballas	Tonioli	Total	Result
1	Foxtrot / "It Had to Be You"	7	8	8	8	31	No elimination
2	Salsa / "Despacito"	7	8	8	9	32	Safe
3	Cha-cha-cha / "Can't Stop the Feeling!"	8	9	9	9	35	Safe
4	Quickstep / "Mr. Blue Sky"	7	8	8	9	32	Safe
5	Waltz / "Can't Help Falling in Love"	8	8	8	N/A	*24	Safe
6	Paso Doble / "Smells Like Teen Spirit"	9	10	9	10	38	Safe
7	Viennese Waltz / "Who's Lovin' You"	4	7	7	7	25	Eliminated

*In week 5, Bruno Tonioli was not present, so scores were out of 30

==== Series 16 ====
For series 16, Manrara was paired with Dr. Ranj Singh.

Week No.	Dance/Song	Judges' score				Total	Result
Week No.	Dance/Song	Horwood	Bussell	Ballas	Tonioli	Total	Result
1	Cha-cha-cha / "How Will I Know"	6	6	8	7	27	No elimination
2	Salsa / "Fireball"	5	6	7	6	24	Safe
3	Quickstep / "Prince Ali"	4	5	5	6	20	Safe
4	Paso Doble / "Canción del Mariachi"	6	7	7	7	27	Safe
5	American Smooth / "Wouldn't It Be Nice"	5	6	7	7*	25	Safe
6	Jive / "Monster Mash"	5	5	5	5	20	Safe
7	Samba / "Freedom! '90"	6	7	7	7	27	Eliminated

==== Series 17 ====
For series 17, Manrara was paired with Paralympic table tennis player Will Bayley.

The couple's Contemporary dance, to Lukas Graham's song "7 Years", was dedicated to the patients and staff at Great Ormond Street Hospital, where Bayley had been treated for cancer, aged seven. Michael Hogan of The Daily Telegraph said the pair "... didn't leave a dry eye in the house after their beautiful, barefoot contemporary dance."

Due to a knee injury sustained during studio rehearsals, Bayley was unable to perform in week 6 (Halloween Week). On 30 October it was confirmed that he had withdrawn from the competition.

Week No.	Dance/song	Judges' score				Total	Result
Week No.	Dance/song	Horwood	Mabuse	Ballas	Tonioli	Total	Result
1	Quickstep / "Pencil Full of Lead"	5	7	7	7	26	No elimination
2	Salsa / "1-2-3"	6	6	6	6	24	Safe
3	Paso Doble / "Gotta Catch 'Em All"	6	6	5	6	23	Safe
4	Foxtrot / "Señorita"	6	6	6	6	24	Safe
5	Contemporary / "7 Years"	7	8	8	9	32^{A}	Safe
6	Jive / "Casper The Friendly Ghost"	—	—	—	—	—	Given bye
7	Waltz / "Weekend in New England	—	—	—	—	—	Withdrew

^A Alfonso Ribeiro filled in for Tonioli

==== Series 18 ====
For series 18, Manrara was paired with HRVY. Due to the COVID-19 pandemic all scores are out of 30 as Bruno Tonioli could not participate due to travel restrictions. This was the first series that Manrara got her first ever perfect score, also the first perfect score in Week 6. It was also her first ever Final since she first joined the show in 2013.

Week No.	Dance/Song	Judges' score			Total	Result
Week No.	Dance/Song	Horwood	Ballas	Mabuse	Total	Result
1	Jive / "Faith"	8	8	9	25	No elimination
2	Viennese Waltz / "Stuck with U"	7	8	9	24	Safe
3	Cha-Cha-Cha / "Don't Go Breaking My Heart"—from Gnomeo & Juliet"	6	7	8	21	Safe
4	Salsa / "Dynamite"	8	10	9*	27	Safe
5	Tango / "Golden"	8	9	9*	26	Safe
6	Street / "Sky Full of Stars"	10	10	10	30	Safe
7	American Smooth / "One (A Chorus Line song)"	9	10	10	29	Safe
8	Rumba / "Only You"—Kylie Minogue & James Corden"	7	8	8	23	Safe
8	Charleston / ""Another Day of Sun"—from La La Land"	10	10	10	30	Safe
9	Jive / "Faith"; Showdance / ""Boogie Wonderland"—Brittany Murphy"; American Smooth / "One (A Chorus Line song)"	9; 9; 10	10; 10; 10	10; 10; 10	29; 29; 30	Runner-up

- During Weeks 4 and 5, Anton Du Beke replaced Mabuse.

== Dance tours and other professional engagements ==
Manrara took part in the national Strictly Come Dancing - The Live Tour in 2017.

In 2018, Manrara & Aljaž Škorjanec announced dates for their 2019 UK Tour 'Remembering The Movies'.

In 2020 Manrara and Aljaž Škorjanec announced dates for their 2021 UK Tour "Remembering The Oscars"

In 2026, Manrara announced she would be teaching & performing with Aljaž Škorjanec at Donaheys Dancing with the Stars weekends in 2027.

== Other projects ==
Following her appearance on So You Think You Can Dance, Manrara joined musical TV series, Glee as a principal dancer. She also made her "Burn the Floor - West End" debut at the Shaftesbury Theatre in London on 21 July 2010. Additionally, she was part of the Burn the Floor US cast, which toured the United States from late 2010 through May 2011. She also appears on the BBC One show Morning Live doing a fitness workout. She has also co presented the show.

On 12 September 2024, Manrara's first book titled Tiny Dancer, Big World was published.

== Personal life ==
In 2015, Manrara became engaged to long-time partner Strictly Come Dancing and Burn the Floor co-star Aljaž Škorjanec. They were married on 15 July 2017.

In February 2023, Janette and Aljaž announced that they were expecting their first child in late summer 2023. Their child, a girl, Lyra Rose was born on 28 July 2023.
