= Aljaž Škorjanec =

Slovenian dancer and choreographer (born 1990)

- Born: 19 February 1990 (age 36); Ptuj, SR Slovenia, Yugoslavia
- Occupations: Dancer and choreographer
- Spouse: Janette Manrara (m. 2017)
- Children: 1

Aljaž Škorjanec (born 19 February 1990) is a Slovenian dancer and choreographer, who is known for appearing on the BBC series Strictly Come Dancing as a professional dancer from 2013 to 2021, and from 2024 onwards.

== Career ==
Aljaž Škorjanec was born in Ptuj, SR Slovenia, Yugoslavia. He is a 19-time Slovenian champion in ballroom, Latin and Ten dance. Between 2000 and 2008, his professional partner was Valerija Rahle Mbanwi.

=== Strictly Come Dancing ===
In September 2013 Škorjanec became a professional dancer on the eleventh series of the British television show, Strictly Come Dancing. He was partnered with model Abbey Clancy. On 30 November, they received the series' first perfect 40 for their Saturday Night Fever-themed Salsa. On 21 December, they won the series. He was the fourth professional to win in his first series of the show. The following year, he returned for the show's twelfth series, where he was partnered with This Morning presenter, Alison Hammond. They were the sixth couple to be eliminated from the competition. For the show's thirteenth series, he was partnered with Call the Midwife actress, Helen George. They were eliminated on week 11 of the competition, leaving in sixth place.

For the show's fourteenth series, he was partnered with model Daisy Lowe. They were the seventh couple to be eliminated from the competition, leaving in eighth place. For the show's fifteenth series, he was partnered with actress and former model, Gemma Atkinson. The couple reached the finals, but they finished as joint runners-up, behind winners Joe McFadden and his professional dance partner, Katya Jones. For the show's sixteenth series, he was partnered with BBC newsreader and journalist Kate Silverton. The couple were eliminated on week 9 in Blackpool, leaving in eighth place.

For the seventeenth series, he was partnered with socialite and chef, Emma Weymouth. They were eliminated on week 7, leaving in ninth place. For the eighteenth series, he was partnered with BBC Radio 1 DJ and presenter, Clara Amfo. For the nineteenth series, he was partnered with Dragons' Den entrepreneur and TV personality, Sara Davies. In March 2022, Škorjanec announced he would be leaving the show after nine years.

In July 2024, it was announced that Škorjanec would be returning as a professional for the twenty-second series. On 7 September 2024, amid speculation suggesting Škorjanec left Strictly due to an altercation with a female colleague in 2022, he said he had taken a break from Strictly to become a father. He was partnered with Love Island finalist Tasha Ghouri. She was the 2nd deaf contestant to compete after series 19 winner Rose Ayling-Ellis. The couple reached the final and finished as joint runners-up behind Chris McCausland and his professional dance partner, Dianne Buswell. They broke the record for the highest-ever average in the history of the show and Anton Du Beke described Ghouri as "the best dancer we've ever had on Strictly".

Series	Partner	Place	Average Score
11	Abbey Clancy	1st	35.6
12	Alison Hammond	10th	24.6
13	Helen George	6th	33.0
14	Daisy Lowe	8th	31.8
15	Gemma Atkinson	2nd	31.0
16	Kate Silverton	8th	25.0
17	Emma Weymouth	9th	27.0
18	Clara Amfo	7th	27.0
19	Sara Davies	8th	28.5
22	Tasha Ghouri	2nd	37.3
23	La Voix	7th	26.3
24	Melanie Walters	14th	15.7

Color key:

Winners
Runners-up
Withdrew

Highest and lowest scoring performances per dance

Dance	Partner	Highest	Partner	Lowest
American Smooth	Tasha Ghouri	40	La Voix	24
Argentine Tango	Tasha Ghouri	38	Kate Silverton	23
Cha-Cha-Cha	Abbey Clancy; Daisy Lowe; Tasha Ghouri	30	La Voix	14
Charleston	Tasha Ghouri	39	Melanie Walters	17
Couple's Choice	Tasha Ghouri	39	Sara Davies	23
Dance-a-thon	Helen George	7	Abbey Clancy; Gemma Atkinson	3
Foxtrot	Abbey Clancy	35	Alison Hammond	22
Jive	Gemma Atkinson	30	La Voix	19
Paso Doble	Tasha Ghouri	39	Abbey Clancy	32
Quickstep	Abbey Clancy	38	Gemma Atkinson	29
Rumba	Abbey Clancy; Tasha Ghouri	34	Kate Silverton	20
Salsa	Abbey Clancy	40	Gemma Atkinson	26
Samba	Abbey Clancy	39	Kate Silverton	20
Showdance	Tasha Ghouri	40	Gemma Atkinson	37
Tango	Sara Davies	36	Emma Weymouth	22
Viennese Waltz	Helen George	39	Clara Amfo	23
Waltz	Abbey Clancy; Tasha Ghouri	40	Melanie Walters	15

- Green numbers indicate Aljaž and his partner were at the top of the leaderboard that week.
- Red numbers indicate Aljaž and his partner were at the bottom of the leaderboard that week.

==== Series 11 ====
Celebrity partner: Abbey Clancy

Week No.	Dance/Song	Judges' score (Note: Individual judges' scores are listed in the following order: Craig Revel Horwood, Darcey Bussell, Len Goodman, Bruno Tonioli.)				Total	Result
1	Waltz / "Kissing You"	8	8	8	8	32	No elimination
2	Cha-Cha-Cha / "Let's Get Loud"	7	7	8	8	30	Safe
3	Jive / "Can't Buy Me Love"	6	7	8	7	28	Safe
4	Tango / "Spectrum"	9	8	9	9	35	Safe
5	Foxtrot / "Dear Darlin'"	8	9	9	9	35	Safe
6	Rumba / "Stay"	8	8	9	9	34	Bottom two
7	Charleston / "Cabaret"	9	9	9	9	36	Safe
8	Quickstep / "Walking on Sunshine"	7	10	10	10	37	Safe
9	Paso Doble / "You Got the Love"	8	8	8	8	32	Safe
10	Salsa / "You Should Be Dancing"	10	10	10	10	40	Safe
11	Viennese Waltz / "Delilah"	9	9	9	10	40 (Note: The couple was awarded three additional points for their dance to "Do You Love Me" in the Swing-a-thon.)	Safe
12	Samba / "Faith"	9	10	10	10	39	Safe
12	American Smooth / "Sweet Caroline"	9	10	10	10	39	Safe
13	Waltz / "Kissing You"	10	10	10	10	40	Winners
13	Showdance / "Sweet Child o' Mine"	9	10	9	10	38	Winners
13	Quickstep / "Walking on Sunshine"	9	10	9	10	38	Winners

==== Series 12 ====
Celebrity partner: Alison Hammond

Week No.	Dance/Song	Judges' score (Note: Individual judges' scores are listed in the following order: Craig Revel Horwood, Darcey Bussell, Len Goodman, Bruno Tonioli.)				Total	Result
1	Cha-Cha-Cha / "I'm Every Woman"	6	6	7	7	26	No elimination
2	Foxtrot / "I Just Want to Make Love to You"	5	5	6	6	22	Safe
3	Jive / "Footloose"	4	5	6	6	28 (Note: Donny Osmond was a guest judge this week and awarded the couple 7 points for their performance.)	Safe
4	Samba / "Bootylicious"	6	7	7	7	27	Safe
5	Tango / "Addicted to You"	5	6	6	6	23	Safe
6	American Smooth / "Wuthering Heights"	5	7	7	7	26	Bottom two
7	Charleston / "Friend Like Me"	6	7	7	7	27	Eliminated

==== Series 13 ====
Celebrity partner: Helen George

Week No.	Dance/Song	Judges' score (Note: Individual judges' scores are listed in the following order: Craig Revel Horwood, Darcey Bussell, Len Goodman, Bruno Tonioli.)				Total	Result
1	Waltz / "With You I'm Born Again"	7	7	7	7	28	No elimination
2	Cha-Cha-Cha / "Uptown Girl"	7	7	7	8	29	Safe
3	Foxtrot / "I Wanna Be Loved by You"	8	8	8	8	32	Safe
4	Salsa / "Dr. Beat"	8	8	8	9	33	Safe
5	Quickstep / "You Can't Hurry Love"	9	9	8	9	35	Safe
6	Samba / "Take Your Mama"	8	9	8	9	34	Safe
7	Rumba / "Hello"	8	8	7	8	31	Safe
8	Tango / "Hold Back the River"	8	9	8	9	34	Safe
9	Charleston / "Anything Goes"	8	9	8	9	34	Safe
10	Viennese Waltz / "At Last"	9	10	10	10	46 (Note: The couple was awarded seven additional points for their dance to "Sing, Sing, Sing" in the Quickstep-a-thon.)	Safe
11	Paso Doble / "At The End of The Day"	8	8	9	9	34	Eliminated

==== Series 14 ====
Celebrity partner: Daisy Lowe

Week No.	Dance/Song	Judges' score (Note: Individual judges' scores are listed in the following order: Craig Revel Horwood, Darcey Bussell, Len Goodman, Bruno Tonioli.)				Total	Result
1	Waltz / "Unforgettable"	7	8	9	8	32	No elimination
2	Cha-Cha-Cha / "Forget You"	7	8	7	8	30	Safe
3	Quickstep / "A Spoonful of Sugar"	7	8	8	8	31	Safe
4	Rumba / "Careless Whisper"	7	8	8	8	31	Safe
5	Charleston / "Happy Feet"	8	8	8	8	32	Bottom two
6	Paso Doble / "Don't Let Me Be Misunderstood"	8	8	8	9	33	Bottom two
7	Viennese Waltz / "Daisy Bell"	8	8	9	9	34	Safe
8	Salsa / "Groove Is in the Heart"	7	8	8	8	31	Eliminated

==== Series 15 ====
Celebrity partner: Gemma Atkinson

Week No.	Dance/Song	Judges' score (Note: Individual judges' scores are listed in the following order: Craig Revel Horwood, Darcey Bussell, Shirley Ballas, Bruno Tonioli.)				Total	Result
1	Cha-Cha-Cha / "There's Nothing Holdin' Me Back"	4	5	5	6	20	No elimination
2	Waltz / "Un Giorno Per Noi (A Time for Us)"	6	6	7	7	26	Safe
3	Charleston / "The Bare Necessities"	7	8	8	8	31	Safe
4	Paso Doble / "Viva la Vida"	8	9	9	9	35	Safe
5	Foxtrot / "Believe"	8	8	8	N/A	24	Safe
6	Jive / "Ever Fallen in Love (With Someone You Shouldn't've)"	7	8	7	8	30	Safe
7	Salsa / "Sun Comes Up"	5	7	7	7	26	Safe
8	Viennese Waltz / "You Don't Have to Say You Love Me"	7	7	7	7	28	Safe
9	American Smooth / "Downtown"	9	9	10	10	38	Safe
10	Samba / "The River of Dreams"	6	6	6	7	28 (Note: The couple was awarded three additional points for their dance to "España cañí" in the Paso Doble-a-thon.)	Safe
11	Quickstep / "Hello, Dolly!"	6	7	8	8	29	Safe
12	Rumba / "Beneath Your Beautiful"	7	8	7	8	30	Bottom two
12	Tango / "My Sharona"	8	8	8	8	32	Bottom two
13	Paso Doble / "Viva la Vida"	9	9	10	10	38	Runners-Up
13	Showdance / "Show Me How You Burlesque"	8	9	10	10	37	Runners-Up
13	American Smooth / "Downtown"	9	10	10	10	39	Runners-Up

==== Series 16 ====
Celebrity partner: Kate Silverton

Week No.	Dance/Song	Judges' score (Note: Individual judges' scores are listed in the following order: Craig Revel Horwood, Darcey Bussell, Shirley Ballas, Bruno Tonioli.)				Total	Result
1	Cha-Cha-Cha / "Kiss"	4	6	4	6	20	No elimination
2	Tango / "No Roots"	6	7	7	7	27	Safe
3	Foxtrot / "Why Don't You Do Right"	6	7	8	8	29	Safe
4	Samba / "Africa"	4	5	5	6	20	Safe
5	Viennese Waltz / "Finally Mine"	6	6	6	8 (Note: Alfonso Ribeiro stood in as a guest judge this week.)	26	Safe
6	Rumba / "Skin"	4	6	5	5	20	Safe
7	Argentine tango / "Assassin's Tango"	4	6	6	7	23	Safe
8	Quickstep / "I Want You to Want Me"	7	7	8	8	30	Safe
9	American Smooth / "Everlasting Love"	7	7	8	8	30	Eliminated

==== Series 17 ====
Celebrity partner: Emma Weymouth

Week No.	Dance/Song	Judges' score (Note: Individual judges' scores are listed in the following order: Craig Revel Horwood, Motsi Mabuse, Shirley Ballas, Bruno Tonioli.)				Total	Result
1	Cha-Cha-Cha / "She's a Lady"	5	5	4	5	19	No elimination
2	Tango / "Sucker"	4	6	6	6	22	Safe
3	Foxtrot / "Did I Make the Most of Loving You?"	7	7	7	7	28	Safe
4	Jive / "Kids in America"	7	7	7	7	28	Bottom two
5	Viennese Waltz / "Saving All My Love For You"	9	9	9	9 (Note: Alfonso Ribeiro stood in as a guest judge this week.)	36	Safe
6	Charleston / "A Little Party Never Killed Nobody (All We Got)"	6	8	8	8	30	Safe
7	Samba / "I Don't Care"	5	7	7	7	26	Eliminated

==== Series 18 ====
Celebrity partner: Clara Amfo

Week No.	Dance/Song	Judges' score (Note: Individual judges' scores are listed in the following order: Craig Revel Horwood, Motsi Mabuse and Shirley Ballas.)			Total	Result
1	Cha-Cha-Cha / "Don't Start Now"	5	6	7	18	No elimination
2	Viennese Waltz / "You Don't Own Me"	5	6	6	17	Safe
3	Tango / "Lady Marmalade"	7	6	7	20	Safe
4	Charleston / "Baby Face"	9	10	10 (Note: Anton Du Beke stood in as a guest judge this week.)	29	Safe
5	Samba / "That's the Way (I Like It)"	5	6	7	18	Safe
6	Jive / "River Deep, Mountain High"	6	6	7	19	Eliminated

==== Series 19 ====
Celebrity partner: Sara Davies

Week No.	Dance/Song	Judges' score (Note: Individual judges' scores are listed in the following order: Craig Revel Horwood, Motsi Mabuse, Shirley Ballas, Anton Du Beke.)				Total	Result
1	Cha-Cha-Cha / "The Boss"	3	5	5	4	17	No elimination
2	Foxtrot / "Dream a Little Dream of Me"	8	8	9	9	34	Safe
3	Samba / "Best Years of Our Lives"	7	7	7	7	28	Safe
4	Tango / "Por una Cabeza"	9	9	9	9	36	Safe
5	Rumba / "You're Still the One"	4	7	7	7	25	Safe
6	Couple's Choice / "Queen Of the Night"	4	7	6	6	23	Safe
7	Quickstep / "9 to 5"	8	8	8	9	33	Safe
8	Argentine Tango / "No More Tears (Enough Is Enough)"	7	8	8	9	32	Eliminated

==== Series 22 ====
Celebrity partner: Tasha Ghouri

Week No.	Dance/Song	Judges' score (Note: Individual judges' scores are listed in the following order: Craig Revel Horwood, Motsi Mabuse, Shirley Ballas, Anton Du Beke.)				Total	Result
1	Cha-Cha-Cha / "Espresso"	8	8	7	7	30	No elimination
2	Viennese Waltz / "Misty Blue"	8	9	9	9	35	Safe
3	Rumba / "What Was I Made For?"	8	8	9	9	34	Safe
4	Charleston / "Unhealthy"	9	10	10	10	39	Safe
5	Tango / "Dog Days Are Over"	8	9	8	9	34	Safe
6	Samba / "I Like to Move It"	9	9	9	10	37	Safe
7	Couple's Choice / "What About Us"	9	10	10	10	39	Safe
8	Quickstep / "Fantasy"	8	10	10	9	37	Safe
9	Paso Doble / "Torn"	9	10	10	10	39	Safe
10	American Smooth / "Someone You Loved"	10	10	10	10	46 (Note: The couple was awarded six additional points for their dance to "Samba (Conga)" and "La Vida Es Un Carnaval" in the Samba-thon.)	Safe
11	Argentine Tango / "Ex-Wives"	9	10	9	10	38	Bottom two
12	Salsa / "Something New"	8	9	9	9	35	Bottom two
12	Waltz / "(You Make Me Feel Like) A Natural Woman"	10	10	10	10	40	Bottom two
13	Couple's Choice / "What About Us"	9	10	10	10	39	Runners-up
13	Showdance / "Sing, Sing, Sing (With a Swing)"	10	10	10	10	40	Runners-up
13	American Smooth / "Someone You Loved"	10	10	10	10	40	Runners-up

==== Series 23 ====
Celebrity partner: La Voix

Week No.	Dance/Song	Judges' score (Note: Individual judges' scores are listed in the following order: Craig Revel Horwood, Motsi Mabuse, Shirley Ballas, Anton Du Beke.)				Total	Result
1	American Smooth / "Pink Pony Club"	6	6	6	6	24	No elimination
2	Jive / "Objection (Tango)"	4	5	5	5	19	Safe
3	Waltz / "Feed the Birds"	7	7	7	7	28	Safe
4	Cha-Cha-Cha / "Hit Me with Your Best Shot"	3	4	2	5	14	Safe
5	Salsa / "Strong Enough"	6	7	7	8	28	Safe
6	Paso Doble / "Symphony No.5 Beethoven"	8	9	9	9	35	Safe
7	Foxtrot / "Make Your Own Kind of Music"	6	8	7	8	29	Bottom two
8	Couple's Choice / "Don't Rain on My Parade"	7	8	9	9	33	Safe
9	Samba / "Love Is in the Air"	-	-	-	-	-	Withdrew

==== Series 24 ====
Celebrity Partner: Melanie Walters

Week No.	Dance/Song	Judges' score (Note: Individual judges' scores are listed in the following order: Craig Revel Horwood, Motsi Mabuse, Shirley Ballas, Anton Du Beke.)				Total	Result
1	Cha-Cha-Cha/Don't Go Breaking My Heart	2	4	4	5	15	No Elimination
2	Waltz/"Edelweiss"	3	4	4	4	15	Safe
3	Charleston/"Ooh Aah... Just a Little Bit"	3	5	4	5	17	Eliminated

With Delta Goodrem

Week No.	Dance/Song	Judges' score (Note: Individual judges' scores are listed in the following order: Craig Revel Horwood, Motsi Mabuse, Shirley Ballas, Anton Du Beke.)				Total	Result
8	Argentine tango/"Missing	9	9	8	9	35	

=== Dance tours ===
In 2017, with Manrara, announced dates for their 2018 UK Tour "Remembering Fred".

In 2020, Škorjanec and Manrara announced dates for their 2021 UK Tour "Remembering The Oscars". In October the year, he also announced that he would be dancing in "Here Come The Boys" in the West End.

In 2026, Škorjanec and Janette Manrara announced appearances at the 2027 "Dancing With The Stars Weekends".

== Personal life ==
Škorjanec is married to fellow dancer Janette Manrara. In February 2023, the couple announced that they were expecting their first child in summer 2023. Their daughter, Lyra, was born in July 2023.

In 2020, Škorjanec explained his developing psoriasis at age 18, saying: "It affects my confidence and self esteem massively" and adding that it makes him self-conscious. Aljaz started to use natural skincare products and document his journey to raise awareness.
