= Ranj Singh =

British clinician and TV presenter (born 1979)

Ranj Singh MRCPCH
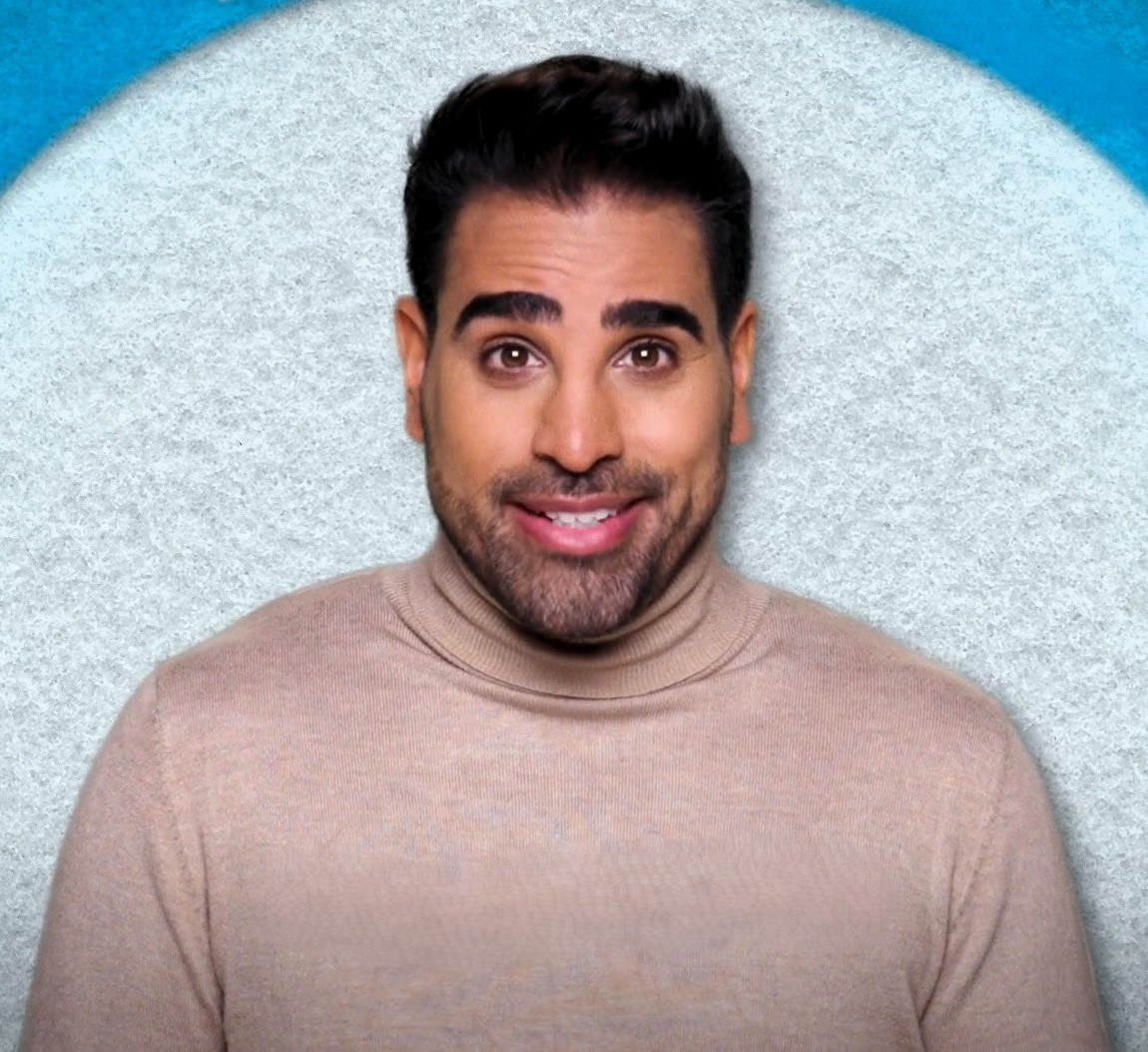
- Singh in an AstraZeneca flu vaccine video in 2021
- Born: Ranjit Singh Sangha; 26 June 1979 (age 47); Chatham, Kent, England
- Education: Gordon Junior School
- Alma mater: Guy's, King's and St Thomas' School of Medicine
- Occupations: Doctor, television presenter
- Employer(s): ITV; NHS
- Spouse: Sulvinder Samra (m. 2005; div. 2011)
- Partner: James Colebrook (2024–present)

Ranjit "Ranj" Singh Sangha (born 26 June 1979), also commonly known as Dr Ranj, is a British doctor, television presenter, author and columnist. He is best known as a celebrity dancer on the BBC One dance series Strictly Come Dancing, and co-creating and presenting the CBeebies show Get Well Soon from 2012 to 2015. He has also worked for ITV, on This Morning, as a resident doctor from 2016 to 2021, co-hosting Save Money: Good Health with Sian Williams and winning Cooking with the Stars in 2022.

== Early life and education ==
Ranj Singh was born on 26 June 1979 in Chatham, Kent, to Indian, traditional Sikh parents. He has two brothers, Harminderjit and Jaskaranjit. As a child, he focused on schoolwork, gaining his first GCSE in the Punjabi language at just eight years old. Singh attended Gordon Junior School in Strood before studying medicine at King's College London GKT School of Medical Education, where he qualified as a physician in 2003.

== Career ==
Singh is a National Health Service (NHS) clinician, starting his career at Medway Maritime Hospital as a specialist in paediatric emergency medicine. Singh became a member of the Royal College of Paediatrics and Child Health in 2007.

His television career began in 2012, having become the presenter for Get Well Soon, a children's television show airing on CBeebies, which he co-created with Kindle Entertainment. In 2016, the show received a children's BAFTA award in the Interactive – Adapted category.

Singh has become a prominent contributor to factual programming and documentaries, appearing on This Morning as a resident doctor and on 20 July 2018, he was a guest presenter on the show, alongside Vanessa Feltz. He has also contributed to a range of other programmes such as Inside Out, 5 News and Good Morning Britain. Singh also appears regularly on various quiz shows and celebrity specials, and in 2017, he won BBC's Pointless Celebrities, alongside physician Hilary Jones.

In August 2018, it was announced that Singh would be a contestant on the sixteenth series of Strictly Come Dancing. He was partnered with Janette Manrara and was the sixth contestant to be eliminated. Following his stint on Strictly, Singh became the host of his own medical advice show, Dr Ranj:ON Call, which began airing on ITV in March 2020.

Outside of his work on television, Singh is the author of two children's educational books: Food Fuel and Skelebones, a Sunday Times bestselling cookbook. Singh is a contributor to and columnist for Al Jazeera, Attitude magazine and NetDoctor.

During the COVID-19 pandemic, Singh stepped back from his media work to focus on supporting the NHS in his role as a paediatric emergency medicine specialist. During the crisis, Singh regularly used his platform to debunk the rise in medical misinformation confusing parents and the general public, being concerned that many are being "duped" by rumours, including from celebrities sharing "fake" information.

Singh was one of the four competitors who took part in the Christmas special edition of The Great British Sewing Bee that was transmitted on Boxing Day 2020 on BBC One. His fellow competitors in the programme were Denise Van Outen, Shirley Ballas and Sara Pascoe.

In April 2021, Singh announced he would be appearing in his own West End musical for a new one-off show called Scrubs to Sparkles, which followed his vocal performances on television show All Star Musicals in March 2021.

From August to November 2021, Singh hosted the television series Extreme Food Phobics, in which applicants would come to cure their food phobias.

In December 2021, Singh appeared as a contestant on a Strictly Come Dancing Special that was also the first episode of the revival series of the BBC game show The Weakest Link, hosted by Romesh Ranganathan.

In December 2023, Singh opened up about his poor mental health whilst working for This Morning. He claimed the show's culture was to blame.

From July 2024, Singh appeared as Lance in the UK tour of & Juliet. In February 2025, Singh received an honorary PhD from Canterbury Christ Church University.

== Personal life ==
Singh married Sulvinder Samra, a pharmacist, at a traditional Sikh wedding ceremony in Nottingham in 2005. He came out as gay to Samra in 2009, and the couple divorced in 2011. He has been in a relationship with actor James Colebrook since 2024.

He has discussed his sexuality in an interview for Attitude magazine in 2015 and in 2018 fronted the cover of Gay Times magazine as part of a special gaysian celebration of LGBTQ Asians. Singh has been an advocate for LGBTQ rights, especially among minorities, and won the Attitude TV Award in 2019 where he spoke about how "People from ethnic minorities, people of colour, or LGBT people are still at a slight disadvantage" in the media. He is an advocate for LGBTQ+-inclusive education.

== Work ==
=== Television ===
Year	Title	Role	Network	Notes
2012–2015	Get Well Soon	Himself	CBeebies	13 Episodes
2012–2015	Get Well Soon Hospital	Dr Ranj	CBeebies	15 Episodes
2013	This Week	Himself	BBC One	1 Episode
2015	The Wright Stuff	Himself	Channel 5	1 Episode
2016	Inside Out	Himself	BBC One	BBC West Midlands, Brexit Special
2016–2021	This Morning	Himself	ITV	Resident Doctor (57 episodes)
2017	Celebrity Eggheads	Himself	BBC Two	1 Episode
2017–2018	Loose Women	Himself	ITV	6 Episodes
2018	Saturday Mash-Up!	Himself	BBC Two & CBBC	1 Episode
2018	The One Show	Himself	BBC One	1 Episode
2018	Strictly Come Dancing	Himself	BBC One	Contestant (Eliminated Week 7)
2018–2021	Strictly Come Dancing: It Takes Two	Himself	BBC Two	12 Episodes
2019	Celebrity Antiques Road Trip	Himself	BBC One	1 Episode
2019–present	Lorraine	Himself	ITV	(2 episodes)
2019	The Ranganation	Himself	BBC Two	1 Episode
2019–2020	Would I Lie to You?	Himself	BBC One	(3 episodes)
2020	Dr Ranj: On Call	Himself	ITV	(4 episodes)
2020	Sport Relief	Himself	BBC One	Special
2020	Celebrity Mastermind	Himself	BBC One	Episode 6
2020	Celebrity Chase	Himself	ITV	Contestant (1 Episode)
2020	Celebrity Catchphrase	Himself	ITV	Christmas Special
2020	The Great British Sewing Bee	Himself	BBC One	Christmas Special
2021	Extreme Food Phobics	Himself	W Channel (10 episodes)	
2021-2025	The Weakest Link	Himself (Contestant)	BBC One (2 episodes)	Strictly Special, Doctors and Nurses Special
2022	Olivier Awards	Guest Presenter	ITV	Award show for West End and other London productions
2022	Richard Osman's House of Games	Himself	BBC Two	Series 4, week 5
2026	The Dickie Show	Himself	BBC	Episode 3, spinoff of Smoggie Queens

=== Theatre ===
Year	Production	Role	Theatre
2024–2025	& Juliet	Lance	National tour

== Bibliography ==
=== Non-fiction ===
- Save Money Lose Weight. London: Transworld Publishers. 2019. ISBN 9781473570726.

=== Children's non-fiction ===
- Food Fuel, Level 9. Illustrated by David Semple. London: Oxford University Press. 2015. ISBN 9780198306429.
- Skelebones, Level 10. Illustrated by David Semple. London: Oxford University Press. 2015. ISBN 9780198306467.
- How To Grow Up Shah Rukh Khan: The No Worries Guide For BOYS. Illustrated by David O' Connell. London: Hachette Children's Group. 2021. ISBN 9781526362957.

== Awards ==
Year	Award	Category	Result
2016	British Academy Children's Awards	Interactive: Adapted – Get Well Soon Hospital App	Won
2018	British Academy Children's Awards	Pre-School Live Action – Get Well Soon Hospital	Won
2019	Attitude Awards	Shah Rukh Khan	Won
