= Strictly Come Dancing series 13 =

Strictly Come Dancing
- Series 13
- Presented by: Tess Daly; Claudia Winkleman
- Judges: Darcey Bussell; Len Goodman; Craig Revel Horwood; Bruno Tonioli
- Celebrity winner: Jay McGuiness
- Professional winner: Aliona Vilani
- No. of episodes: 27

Release
- Original network: BBC One
- Original release: 5 September – 19 December 2015

Series chronology
- ← Previous; Series 12 Next → Series 14

Strictly Come Dancing returned for its thirteenth series on BBC One with a launch show on 5 September 2015, and the live shows beginning on 25 September 2015. Tess Daly and Claudia Winkleman returned to present the launch show and the live shows while Zoe Ball returned to present Strictly Come Dancing: It Takes Two on BBC Two. Darcey Bussell, Len Goodman, Craig Revel Horwood, and Bruno Tonioli all returned as judges.

The Wanted singer Jay McGuiness and Aliona Vilani were announced as the winners on 19 December, while Kellie Bright and Kevin Clifton, and Georgia May Foote and Giovanni Pernice were the runners-up.

== Format ==
Hosts and Judges for Strictly Come Dancing Series 13

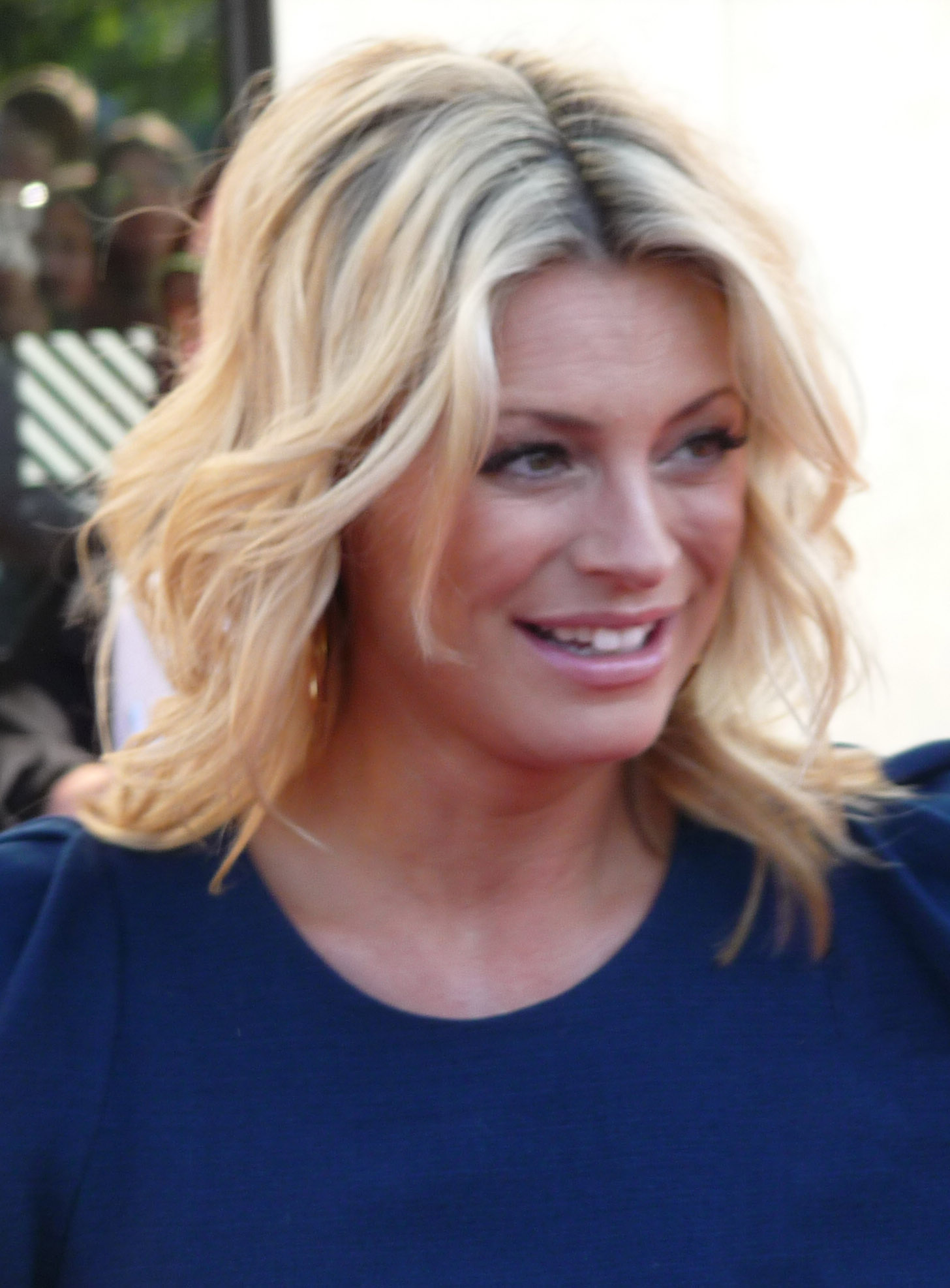
Tess Daly

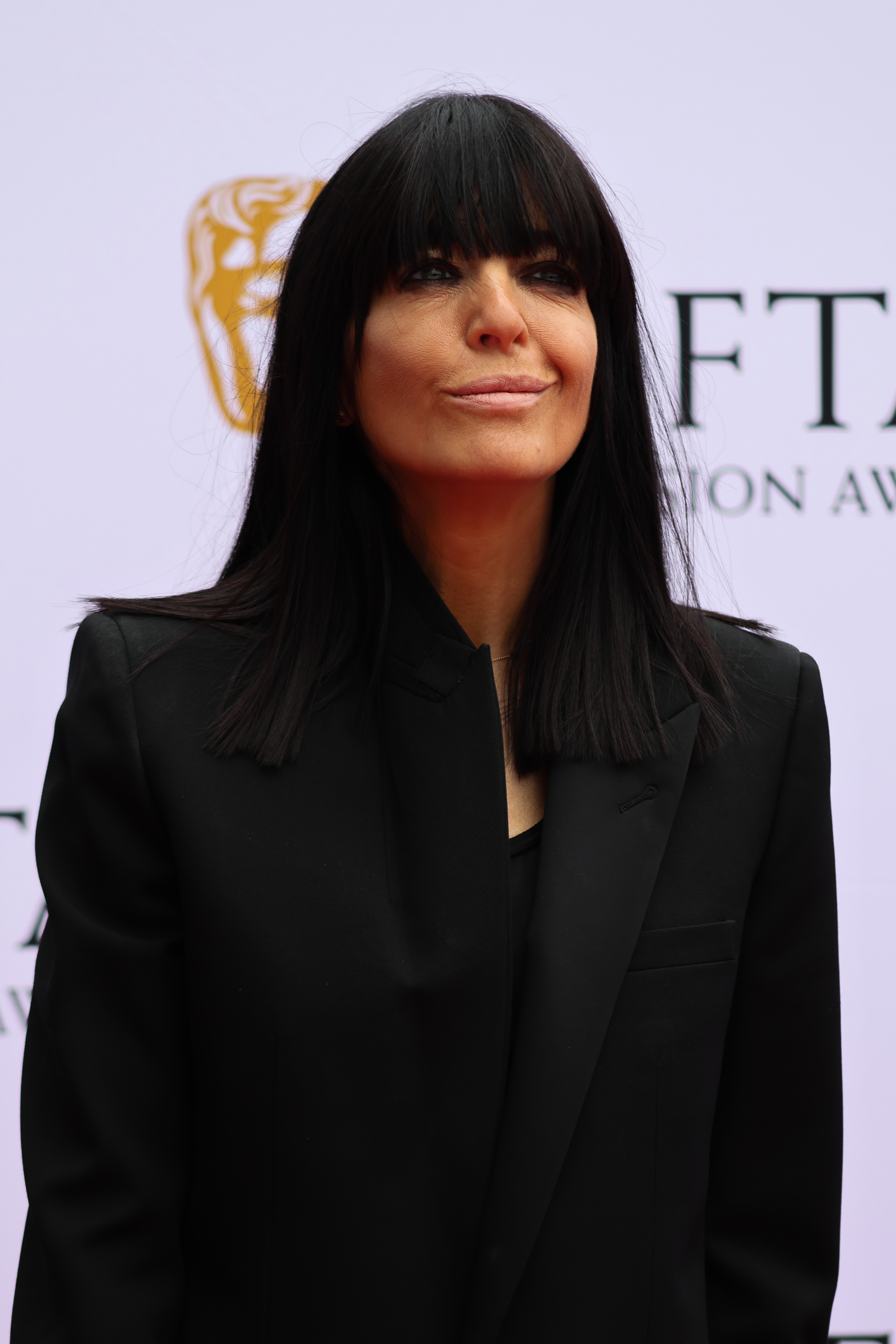
Claudia Winkleman

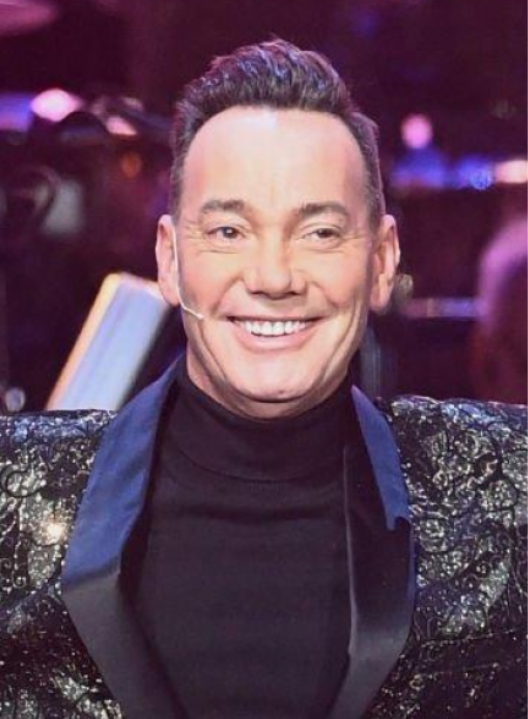
Craig Revel Horwood

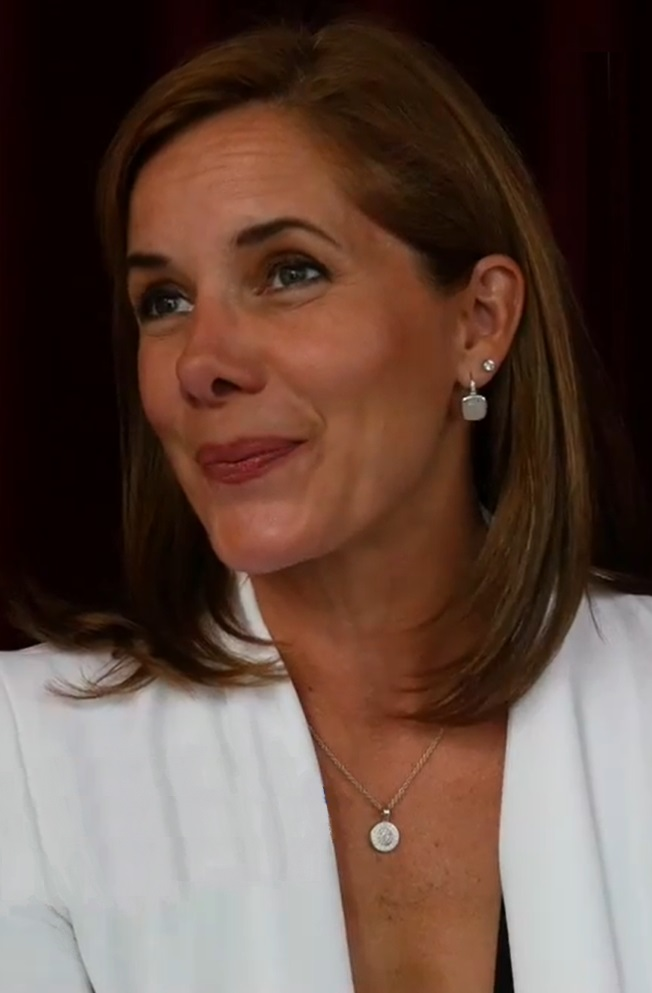
Darcey Bussell

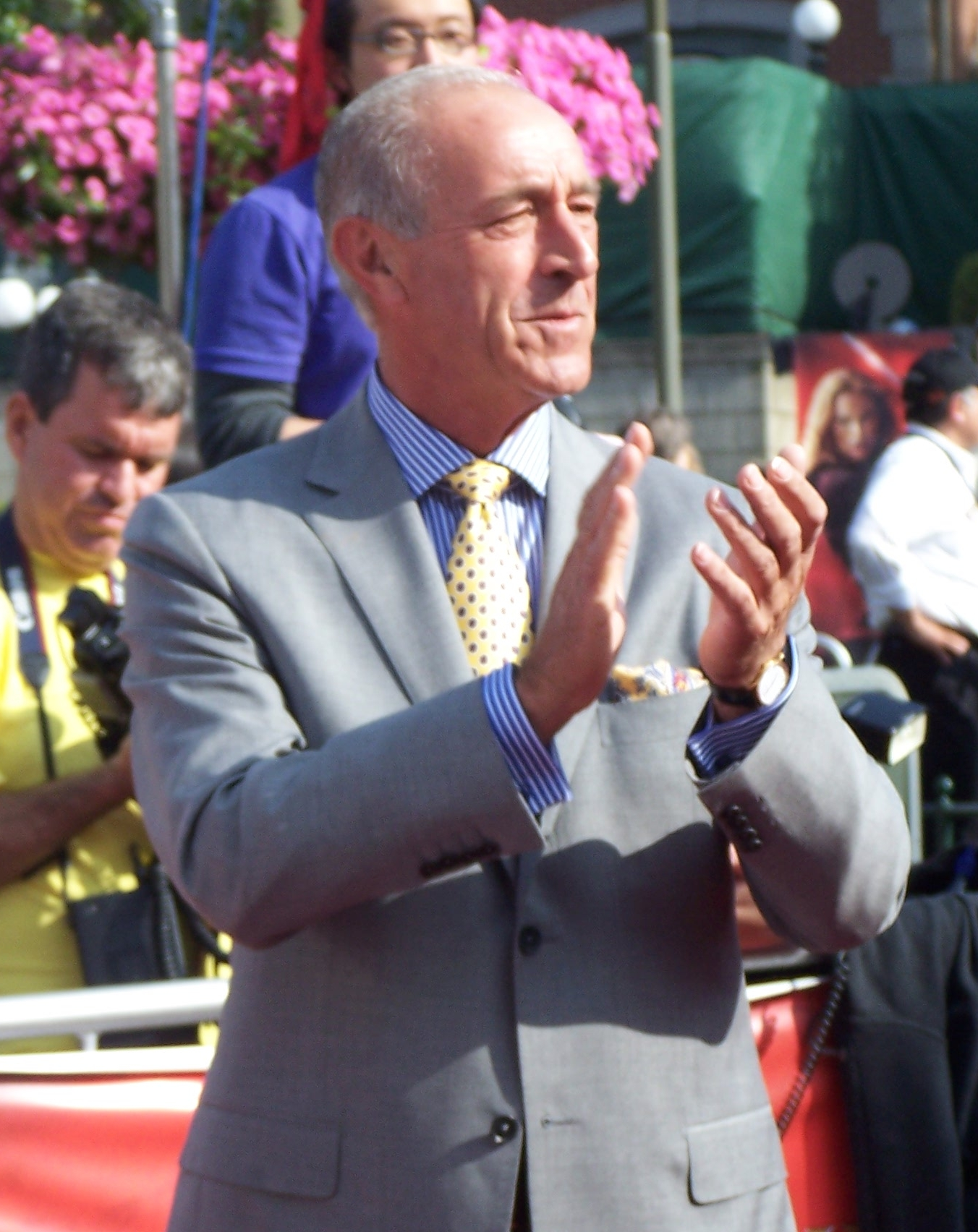
Len Goodman

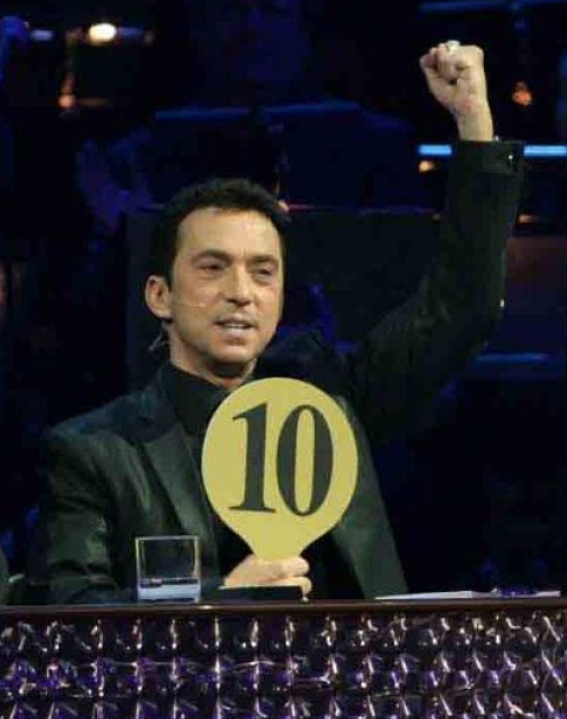
Bruno Tonioli

The couples dance each week in a live show. The judges score each performance out of ten. The couples are then ranked according to the judges' scores and given points according to their rank, with the lowest scored couple receiving one point, and the highest scored couple receiving the most points (the maximum number of points available depends on the number of couples remaining in the competition). The public are also invited to vote for their favourite couples, and the couples are ranked again according to the number of votes they receive, again receiving points; the couple with the fewest votes receiving one point, and the couple with the most votes receiving the most points.

The points for judges' score and public vote are then added together, and the two couples with the fewest points are placed in the bottom two. If two couples have equal points, the points from the public vote are given precedence. As with the previous series, the bottom two couples have to perform a dance-off on the results show. Based on that performance alone, each judge then votes on which couple should stay and which couple should leave, with Len Goodman, as head judge, having the last and deciding vote.

== Professional dancers ==
On 23 April 2015, the list of professionals who were returning for the thirteenth series was revealed. Professionals from the previous series who did not return included Trent Whiddon and Iveta Lukošiūtė. Robin Windsor, who had not taken part in the previous series due to an injury, did not return for this series, though he would be involved in the spin-off show It Takes Two. Joanne Clifton was also involved in It Takes Two and appeared in the 2015 Children in Need and Christmas specials. Three new professional dancers were introduced: Russian dancer Gleb Savchenko, Italian dancer Giovanni Pernice, and South African dancer Oti Mabuse.

== Couples ==
This series featured fifteen celebrity contestants. On 10 August 2015, broadcaster Jeremy Vine was the first celebrity announced for the series, with more celebrities revealed throughout the month. The lineup was fully announced on 27 August 2015 on The One Show.

Celebrity	Notability	Professional partner	Status
Iwan Thomas	Olympic sprinter & sports pundit	Ola Jordan	Eliminated 1st on 4 October 2015
Anthony Ogogo	Olympic boxer	Oti Mabuse	Eliminated 2nd on 11 October 2015
Daniel O'Donnell	Singer-songwriter	Kristina Rihanoff	Eliminated 3rd on 18 October 2015
Ainsley Harriott	Chef & Ready Steady Cook presenter	Natalie Lowe	Eliminated 4th on 25 October 2015
Kirsty Gallacher	Television presenter	Brendan Cole	Eliminated 5th on 1 November 2015
Carol Kirkwood	BBC Breakfast weather presenter	Pasha Kovalev	Eliminated 6th on 8 November 2015
Jeremy Vine	BBC Radio 2 presenter & journalist	Karen Clifton	Eliminated 7th on 15 November 2015
Jamelia	Singer & Loose Women panellist	Tristan MacManus	Eliminated 8th on 22 November 2015
Peter Andre	Singer & television personality	Janette Manrara	Eliminated 9th on 29 November 2015
Helen George	Call the Midwife actress	Aljaž Škorjanec	Eliminated 10th on 6 December 2015
Anita Rani	Television presenter	Gleb Savchenko	Eliminated 11th on 13 December 2015
Katie Derham	BBC Proms & BBC Radio 3 presenter	Anton Du Beke	Fourth place on 19 December 2015
Georgia May Foote	Coronation Street actress	Giovanni Pernice	Runners-up on 19 December 2015
Kellie Bright	EastEnders actress	Kevin Clifton	Runners-up on 19 December 2015
Jay McGuiness	The Wanted singer	Aliona Vilani	Winners on 19 December 2015

== Scoring chart ==
The highest score each week is indicated in bold green with a dagger (†), while the lowest score each week is indicated in italicized red with a double-dagger (‡).

Color key:

Winners
Runners-up
Fourth place
Bottom two
Eliminated

Strictly Come Dancing (series 13) - Weekly scores
Couple	Pl.	Week														
Couple	Pl.	1	2	1+2	3	4	5	6	7	8	9	10	11	12	13	
Couple	Pl.	1	2	1+2	3	4	5	6	7	8	9	10	11	12	Show 1	Show 2
Jay & Aliona	1st	27	**31**†	58	**37**†	25	33	34	34	30	36	38+3=41	**39**†	34+37=71	36+35=71	+39=110‡ (Note: This couple finished in first place.)
Georgia & Giovanni	2nd	27	25	52	27	31	31	**35**†	35	**39**†	**38**†	33+6=39	36 (Note: This couple was in the bottom two, but was not eliminated.)	33+38=71	36+36=72	+40=112 (Note: This couple finished in second place.)
Kellie & Kevin	2nd	27	27	54	32	32	**35**†	28	32	33	37	34+2=36	36	34+39=**73**†	40+40=**80**†	+39=**119**†
Katie & Anton	4th	26	28	54	20	**33**†	21	21	26	31	35	32+5=37	35	25+31=56‡	31+31=62‡ (Note: This couple was eliminated.)	
Anita & Gleb	5th	27	27	54	29	27	32	29	34	32	37	31+4=35	31‡	32+32=64		
Helen & Aljaž	6th	29	29	58	32	32	**35**†	34	31	34	34	39+7=**46**†	34			
Peter & Janette	7th	**30**†	30	**60**†	28	32	29	28	**38**†	34	29‡	31+1=32‡				
Jamelia & Tristan	8th	21	21	42	25	32	26	26	28	26	31					
Jeremy & Karen	9th	19	17	36	24	20‡	18‡	22	21	21‡						
Carol & Pasha	10th	16‡	20	36	17‡	22	21	13‡	17‡							
Kirsty & Brendan	11th	20	20	40	23	21	29	17								
Ainsley & Natalie	12th	20	26	46	20	26	21									
Daniel & Kristina	13th	24	23	47	21	23										
Anthony & Oti	14th	21	19	40	19											
Iwan & Ola	15th	17	13‡	30‡												

=== Average chart ===
This table only counts for dances scored on a traditional 40-point scale.

Couple	Rank by average	Total points	Number of dances	Total average
Jay & Aliona	1st	545	16	34.1
Kellie & Kevin	1st	545	16	34.1
Georgia & Giovanni	3rd	540	16	33.8
Helen & Aljaž	4th	363	11	33.0
Peter & Janette	5th	309	10	30.9
Anita & Gleb	6th	400	13	30.8
Katie & Anton	7th	426	15	28.4
Jamelia & Tristan	8th	236	9	26.2
Daniel & Kristina	9th	91	4	22.8
Ainsley & Natalie	10th	113	5	22.6
Kirsty & Brendan	11th	130	6	21.7
Jeremy & Karen	12th	162	8	20.3
Anthony & Oti	13th	59	3	19.7
Carol & Pasha	14th	126	7	18.0
Iwan & Ola	15th	30	2	15.0

== Weekly scores ==
Unless indicated otherwise, individual judges scores in the charts below (given in parentheses) are listed in this order from left to right: Craig Revel Horwood, Darcey Bussell, Len Goodman, Bruno Tonioli.

=== Week 1 ===
Six of the couples performed on the first night and the other nine couples performed on the second night. There was no elimination this week; all scores and votes carried over to the following week. Couples are listed in the order they performed.

Night 1 (Friday)

Couple	Scores	Dance	Music
Kellie & Kevin	27 (6, 7, 7, 7)	Tango	"You Really Got Me" — The Kinks
Anthony & Oti	21 (4, 5, 6, 6)	Jive	"Wake Me Up Before You Go-Go" — Wham!
Helen & Aljaž	29 (7, 7, 7, 8)	Waltz	"With You I'm Born Again" — Billy Preston & Syreeta Wright
Carol & Pasha	16 (2, 5, 5, 4)	Cha-cha-cha	"Thunder in My Heart" — Leo Sayer
Daniel & Kristina	24 (4, 6, 7, 7)	Waltz	"When Irish Eyes Are Smiling" — Bing Crosby
Anita & Gleb	27 (6, 7, 7, 7)	Cha-cha-cha	"Rather Be" — Clean Bandit, feat. Jess Glynne

Night 2 (Saturday)

Couple	Scores	Dance	Music
Jay & Aliona	27 (5, 8, 7, 7)	Cha-cha-cha	"Reach Out, I'll Be There" — Human Nature
Kirsty & Brendan	20 (4, 5, 6, 5)	Waltz	"Vincent" — Don McLean
Jeremy & Karen	19 (2, 6, 6, 5)	Cha-cha-cha	"September" — Earth, Wind & Fire
Georgia & Giovanni	27 (6, 7, 7, 7)	Jive	"Dear Future Husband" — Meghan Trainor
Ainsley & Natalie	20 (4, 5, 6, 5)	Tango	"Voulez-Vous" — ABBA
Katie & Anton	26 (6, 6, 7, 7)	Jive	"Roll Over Beethoven" — Chuck Berry
Iwan & Ola	17 (3, 5, 5, 4)	Tango	"Keep on Running" — The Spencer Davis Group
Jamelia & Tristan	21 (4, 6, 6, 5)	Waltz	"Do Right Woman, Do Right Man" — Aretha Franklin
Peter & Janette	30 (7, 8, 8, 7)	Cha-cha-cha	"Ain't No Other Man" — Christina Aguilera

=== Week 2 ===
Musical guest: Rod Stewart — "Please"

Couples are listed in the order they performed.

Couple	Scores	Dance	Music	Result
Jamelia & Tristan	21 (4, 6, 5, 6)	Cha-cha-cha	"Don't Cha" — The Pussycat Dolls	Bottom two
Daniel & Kristina	23 (5, 6, 6, 6)	Charleston	"Let's Misbehave" — Cole Porter	Safe
Kirsty & Brendan	20 (5, 5, 5, 5)	Salsa	"Can't Touch It" — Ricki-Lee	Safe
Jay & Aliona	31 (7, 8, 8, 8)	Waltz	"See the Day" — Dee C. Lee	Safe
Iwan & Ola	13 (2, 4, 4, 3)	Cha-cha-cha	"Sexy and I Know It" — LMFAO	Eliminated
Georgia & Giovanni	25 (6, 6, 6, 7)	Waltz	"Georgia on My Mind" — Ray Charles	Safe
Ainsley & Natalie	26 (6, 7, 7, 6)	Salsa	"Don't Touch My Tomatoes" — Josephine Baker	Safe
Carol & Pasha	20 (4, 6, 5, 5)	Foxtrot	"It's a Lovely Day Today" — Irving Berlin	Safe
Kellie & Kevin	27 (6, 7, 7, 7)	Cha-cha-cha	"Don't Go Breaking My Heart" — Elton John & Kiki Dee	Safe
Anthony & Oti	19 (4, 5, 5, 5)	Waltz	"If You Don't Know Me by Now" — Simply Red	Safe
Anita & Gleb	27 (7, 8, 6, 6)	Charleston	"Pencil Full of Lead" — Paolo Nutini	Safe
Jeremy & Karen	17 (3, 5, 5, 4)	American Smooth	"Happy Together" — The Turtles	Safe
Katie & Anton	28 (7, 7, 7, 7)	Tango	"Telephone" — Martynas Levickis	Safe
Peter & Janette	30 (7, 8, 7, 8)	Quickstep	"Valerie" — Mark Ronson, feat. Amy Winehouse	Safe
Helen & Aljaž	29 (7, 7, 7, 8)	Cha-cha-cha	"Uptown Girl" — Billy Joel	Safe

Judges' votes to save

- Horwood: Jamelia & Tristan
- Bussell: Jamelia & Tristan
- Tonioli: Jamelia & Tristan
- Goodman: Did not vote, but would have voted to save Jamelia & Tristan

=== Week 3: Movie Week ===
Musical guest: Andrea Bocelli — "Don't Cry for Me Argentina" (from Evita)

Couples are listed in the order they performed.

Couple	Scores	Dance	Music	Film	Result
Carol & Pasha	17 (3, 5, 5, 4)	Quickstep	"I'm Gonna Wash That Man Right Outa My Hair"	South Pacific	Safe
Anthony & Oti	19 (4, 6, 5, 4)	Paso doble	"Eye of the Tiger"	Rocky III	Eliminated
Katie & Anton	20 (4, 6, 5, 5)	Cha-cha-cha	"Oh, Pretty Woman"	Pretty Woman	Safe
Kellie & Kevin	32 (8, 8, 8, 8)	Charleston	"Cantina Band"	Star Wars	Safe
Ainsley & Natalie	20 (3, 6, 6, 5)	Cha-cha-cha	"Boogie Wonderland"	Happy Feet	Bottom two
Georgia & Giovanni	27 (7, 7, 6, 7)	Rumba	"Writing's on the Wall"	Spectre	Safe
Helen & Aljaž	32 (8, 8, 8, 8)	Foxtrot	"I Wanna Be Loved by You"	Some Like It Hot	Safe
Daniel & Kristina	21 (4, 6, 6, 5)	Cha-cha-cha	"Summer Nights"	Grease	Safe
Kirsty & Brendan	23 (5, 6, 6, 6)	American Smooth	"He's a Tramp"	Lady and the Tramp	Safe
Peter & Janette	28 (7, 7, 7, 7)	Paso doble	"He's a Pirate"	Pirates of the Caribbean: The Curse of the Black Pearl	Safe
Jamelia & Tristan	25 (6, 7, 6, 6)	Salsa	"Heaven Must Be Missing an Angel"	Charlie's Angels	Safe
Jeremy & Karen	24 (3, 7, 7, 7)	Charleston	"Top Hat, White Tie and Tails"	Top Hat	Safe
Anita & Gleb	29 (6, 8, 8, 7)	American Smooth	"Unchained Melody"	Ghost	Safe
Jay & Aliona	37 (9, 9, 9, 10)	Jive	"You Never Can Tell" & "Misirlou"	Pulp Fiction	Safe

Judges' votes to save

- Horwood: Ainsley & Natalie
- Bussell: Ainsley & Natalie
- Tonioli: Ainsley & Natalie
- Goodman: Did not vote, but would have voted to save Ainsley & Natalie

=== Week 4 ===
Musical guest: Will Young — "Joy"

Couples are listed in the order they performed.

Couple	Scores	Dance	Music	Result
Anita & Gleb	27 (6, 7, 7, 7)	Samba	"Hips Don't Lie" — Shakira	Safe
Daniel & Kristina	23 (5, 6, 6, 6)	American Smooth	"Fly Me to the Moon" — Frank Sinatra	Eliminated
Kirsty & Brendan	21 (4, 6, 6, 5)	Paso doble	"Beautiful Day" — U2	Bottom two
Georgia & Giovanni	31 (7, 7, 9, 8)	Quickstep	"Reach" — S Club 7	Safe
Jeremy & Karen	20 (3, 6, 6, 5)	Jive	"Splish Splash" — Bobby Darin	Safe
Kellie & Kevin	32 (8, 8, 8, 8)	Foxtrot	"Dream a Little Dream of Me" — Mama Cass	Safe
Jamelia & Tristan	32 (8, 8, 8, 8)	Charleston	"Straight Up" — Scott Bradlee's Postmodern Jukebox	Safe
Jay & Aliona	25 (5, 7, 6, 7)	Quickstep	"My Generation" — The Who	Safe
Carol & Pasha	22 (5, 6, 6, 5)	Paso doble	"España cañí" — Pascual Marquina Narro	Safe
Ainsley & Natalie	26 (6, 7, 7, 6)	Waltz	"What a Wonderful World" — Louis Armstrong	Safe
Helen & Aljaž	32 (8, 8, 8, 8)	Salsa	"Dr. Beat" — Miami Sound Machine	Safe
Peter & Janette	32 (8, 8, 8, 8)	Tango	"Blue Monday" — New Order	Safe
Katie & Anton	33 (8, 9, 8, 8)	Viennese waltz	"If I Can Dream" — Elvis Presley	Safe

Judges' votes to save

- Horwood: Kirsty & Brendan
- Bussell: Kirsty & Brendan
- Tonioli: Kirsty & Brendan
- Goodman: Did not vote, but would have voted to save Kirsty & Brendan

=== Week 5 ===
Musical guest: Bryan Adams — "Brand New Day"

Couples are listed in the order they performed.

Couple	Scores	Dance	Music	Result
Georgia & Giovanni	31 (7, 8, 8, 8)	Salsa	"You Make Me Feel (Mighty Real)" — Sylvester	Safe
Carol & Pasha	21 (4, 6, 6, 5)	Viennese waltz	"I've Been Loving You Too Long" — Seal	Safe
Anita & Gleb	32 (8, 8, 8, 8)	Tango	"Sweet Disposition" — The Temper Trap	Safe
Peter & Janette	29 (7, 7, 8, 7)	Rumba	"Thinking Out Loud" — Ed Sheeran	Safe
Kirsty & Brendan	29 (7, 7, 8, 7)	Viennese waltz	"This Year's Love" — David Gray	Safe
Ainsley & Natalie	21 (4, 6, 6, 5)	Jive	"Shake, Rattle and Roll" — Bill Haley & His Comets	Eliminated
Jamelia & Tristan	26 (5, 7, 7, 7)	Foxtrot	"Because You Loved Me" — Celine Dion	Bottom two
Katie & Anton	21 (4, 6, 6, 5)	Salsa	"It Had Better Be Tonight" — Michael Bublé	Safe
Jeremy & Karen	18 (3, 5, 6, 4)	Waltz	"She" — Elvis Costello	Safe
Helen & Aljaž	35 (9, 9, 8, 9)	Quickstep	"You Can't Hurry Love" — The Supremes	Safe
Jay & Aliona	33 (8, 9, 8, 8)	Paso doble	"It's My Life" — Bon Jovi	Safe
Kellie & Kevin	35 (8, 9, 9, 9)	Jive	"One Way or Another (Teenage Kicks)" — One Direction	Safe

Judges' votes to save

- Horwood: Jamelia & Tristan
- Bussell: Jamelia & Tristan
- Tonioli: Jamelia & Tristan
- Goodman: Did not vote, but would have voted to save Jamelia & Tristan

=== Week 6: Halloween Week ===
Musical guest: James Morrison — "Demons"

Couples are listed in the order they performed.

Couple	Scores	Dance	Music	Result
Katie & Anton	21 (4, 6, 6, 5)	Paso doble	"The Phantom of the Opera" — from The Phantom of the Opera	Safe
Kirsty & Brendan	17 (3, 5, 5, 4)	Charleston	"Bad Romance" — Scott Bradlee's Postmodern Jukebox	Eliminated
Jeremy & Karen	22 (4, 6, 6, 6)	Salsa	"Thriller" — Michael Jackson	Safe
Anita & Gleb	29 (6, 8, 8, 7)	Waltz	"Once Upon a Dream" — Lana Del Rey	Safe
Jamelia & Tristan	26 (6, 6, 7, 7)	Jive	"Time Warp" — from The Rocky Horror Picture Show	Bottom two
Jay & Aliona	34 (8, 9, 8, 9)	American Smooth	"Li'l Red Riding Hood" — Sam the Sham & The Pharaohs	Safe
Kellie & Kevin	28 (7, 7, 7, 7)	Paso doble	"Hedwig's Theme" — John Williams & "School's Out" — Alice Cooper	Safe
Carol & Pasha	13 (2, 4, 4, 3)	Rumba	"I Think I Love You" — The Partridge Family	Safe
Georgia & Giovanni	35 (8, 9, 9, 9)	Tango	"Ghostbusters" — Ray Parker Jr.	Safe
Peter & Janette	28 (7, 7, 7, 7)	Foxtrot	"Ghost" — Ella Henderson	Safe
Helen & Aljaž	34 (8, 9, 8, 9)	Samba	"Take Your Mama" — Scissor Sisters	Safe

Judges' votes to save

- Horwood: Jamelia & Tristan
- Bussell: Jamelia & Tristan
- Tonioli: Jamelia & Tristan
- Goodman: Did not vote, but would have voted to save Jamelia & Tristan

=== Week 7 ===
Musical guest: Seal — "Every Time I'm With You"

Couples are listed in the order they performed.

Couple	Scores	Dance	Music	Result
Peter & Janette	38 (9, 10, 10, 9)	Charleston	"Do Your Thing" — Basement Jaxx	Safe
Jamelia & Tristan	28 (7, 7, 7, 7)	Viennese waltz	"Trouble" — Ray LaMontagne	Safe
Carol & Pasha	17 (3, 5, 5, 4)	American Smooth	"Man! I Feel Like a Woman!" — Shania Twain	Eliminated
Helen & Aljaž	31 (8, 8, 7, 8)	Rumba	"Hello" — Adele	Safe
Jay & Aliona	34 (8, 9, 8, 9)	Argentine tango	"Diferente" — Gotan Project	Safe
Katie & Anton	26 (6, 7, 7, 6)	Quickstep	"42nd Street" — from 42nd Street	Safe
Anita & Gleb	34 (8, 8, 9, 9)	Jive	"The Boy Does Nothing" — Alesha Dixon	Safe
Kellie & Kevin	32 (8, 8, 8, 8)	Waltz	"Love Ain't Here Anymore" — Take That	Bottom two
Jeremy & Karen	21 (4, 6, 6, 5)	Tango	"Go West" — Village People	Safe
Georgia & Giovanni	35 (8, 9, 9, 9)	Samba	"Volare" — Gipsy Kings	Safe

Judges' votes to save

- Horwood: Kellie & Kevin
- Bussell: Kellie & Kevin
- Tonioli: Kellie & Kevin
- Goodman: Did not vote, but would have voted to save Kellie & Kevin

=== Week 8 ===
Musical guests:

- Years & Years — "King"
- Brandon Flowers — "Still Want You"

Couples are listed in the order they performed.

Couple	Scores	Dance	Music	Result
Anita & Gleb	32 (8, 8, 8, 8)	Quickstep	"Don't Get Me Wrong" — The Pretenders	Safe
Jay & Aliona	30 (6, 8, 8, 8)	Foxtrot	"Lay Me Down" — Sam Smith	Safe
Jamelia & Tristan	26 (5, 7, 7, 7)	Samba	"A Little Respect" — Erasure	Bottom two
Helen & Aljaž	34 (8, 9, 8, 9)	Tango	"Hold Back the River" — James Bay	Safe
Katie & Anton	31 (7, 8, 8, 8)	Rumba	"Never, Never, Never" — Shirley Bassey	Safe
Kellie & Kevin	33 (9, 8, 7, 9)	Samba	"Boom! Shake the Room" — DJ Jazzy Jeff & The Fresh Prince	Safe
Peter & Janette	34 (8, 9, 8, 9)	Viennese waltz	"You're My World" — Cilla Black	Safe
Georgia & Giovanni	39 (9, 10, 10, 10)	Charleston	"Hot Honey Rag" — from Chicago	Safe
Jeremy & Karen	21 (4, 6, 6, 5)	Quickstep	"Going Underground" — The Jam	Eliminated

Judges' votes to save

- Horwood: Jamelia & Tristan
- Bussell: Jamelia & Tristan
- Tonioli: Jamelia & Tristan
- Goodman: Did not vote, but would have voted to save Jamelia & Tristan

=== Week 9: Blackpool Week ===
Musical guests:

- Anastacia — "I'm Outta Love"
- Take That — "Hey Boy"

This week's episode was staged in the Tower Ballroom at the Blackpool Tower in Blackpool, Lancashire. Couples are listed in the order they performed.

Couple	Scores	Dance	Music	Result
Jay & Aliona	36 (9, 9, 9, 9)	Salsa	"Cuba" — Gibson Brothers	Safe
Jamelia & Tristan	31 (7, 8, 8, 8)	Quickstep	"I'm a Believer" — The Monkees	Eliminated
Anita & Gleb	37 (9, 10, 9, 9)	Paso doble	"Malagueña" — Connie Francis	Safe
Katie & Anton	35 (8, 9, 9, 9)	American Smooth	"Ain't That a Kick in the Head?" — Dean Martin	Safe
Peter & Janette	29 (6, 7, 8, 8)	Jive	"River Deep, Mountain High" — Ike & Tina Turner	Bottom two
Georgia & Giovanni	38 (9, 9, 10, 10)	American Smooth	"I Have Nothing" — Whitney Houston	Safe
Helen & Aljaž	34 (8, 9, 8, 9)	Charleston	"Anything Goes" — from Anything Goes	Safe
Kellie & Kevin	37 (9, 9, 9, 10)	Quickstep	"9 to 5" — Dolly Parton	Safe

Judges' votes to save

- Horwood: Peter & Janette
- Bussell: Peter & Janette
- Tonioli: Peter & Janette
- Goodman: Did not vote, but would have voted to save Jamelia & Tristan

=== Week 10 ===
Musical guests:

- Adam Lambert — "Another Lonely Night"
- Il Divo — "¿Quien Será? (Sway)"

Each couple performed one routine and then all couples participated in a quickstep marathon for additional points. Couples are listed in the order they performed.

Couple	Scores	Dance	Music	Result
Kellie & Kevin	34 (8, 8, 9, 9)	Salsa	"I Want You Back" — The Jackson 5	Bottom two
Katie & Anton	32 (7, 8, 8, 9)	Argentine tango	"Libertango" — Bond	Safe
Helen & Aljaž	39 (9, 10, 10, 10)	Viennese waltz	"At Last" — Etta James	Safe
Jay & Aliona	38 (9, 10, 9, 10)	Tango	"When Doves Cry" — Prince	Safe
Peter & Janette	31 (7, 8, 8, 8)	American Smooth	"I Get the Sweetest Feeling" — Jackie Wilson	Eliminated
Anita & Gleb	31 (7, 8, 7, 9)	Rumba	"Read All About It, Pt. III" — Emeli Sandé	Safe
Georgia & Giovanni	33 (8, 8, 8, 9)	Paso doble	"The Final Countdown" — Europe	Safe
Peter & Janette	1	Quickstep-a-thon (Quickstep Marathon)	"Sing Sing Sing" — The Andrews Sisters	
Kellie & Kevin	2	Quickstep-a-thon (Quickstep Marathon)	"Sing Sing Sing" — The Andrews Sisters	
Jay & Aliona	3	Quickstep-a-thon (Quickstep Marathon)	"Sing Sing Sing" — The Andrews Sisters	
Anita & Gleb	4	Quickstep-a-thon (Quickstep Marathon)	"Sing Sing Sing" — The Andrews Sisters	
Katie & Anton	5	Quickstep-a-thon (Quickstep Marathon)	"Sing Sing Sing" — The Andrews Sisters	
Georgia & Giovanni	6	Quickstep-a-thon (Quickstep Marathon)	"Sing Sing Sing" — The Andrews Sisters	
Helen & Aljaž	7	Quickstep-a-thon (Quickstep Marathon)	"Sing Sing Sing" — The Andrews Sisters	

Judges' votes to save

- Horwood: Kellie & Kevin
- Bussell: Kellie & Kevin
- Tonioli: Kellie & Kevin
- Goodman: Did not vote, but would have voted to save Kellie & Kevin

=== Week 11: Musicals Week (Quarter-final) ===
Musical guest: Josh Groban — "Over the Rainbow"

Couples are listed in the order they performed.

Couple	Scores	Dance	Music	Musical	Result
Georgia & Giovanni	36 (9, 9, 9, 9)	Foxtrot	"Beauty and the Beast"	Beauty and the Beast	Bottom two
Anita & Gleb	31 (6, 8, 9, 8)	Argentine tango	"Cell Block Tango"	Chicago	Safe
Kellie & Kevin	36 (9, 9, 9, 9)	Viennese waltz	"Oom-Pah-Pah"	Oliver!	Safe
Jay & Aliona	39 (9, 10, 10, 10)	Rumba	"Falling Slowly"	Once	Safe
Katie & Anton	35 (8, 9, 9, 9)	Foxtrot	"Maybe This Time"	Cabaret	Safe
Helen & Aljaž	34 (8, 8, 9, 9)	Paso doble	"At the End of the Day"	Les Misérables	Eliminated

Judges' votes to save

- Horwood: Georgia & Giovanni
- Bussell: Georgia & Giovanni
- Tonioli: Georgia & Giovanni
- Goodman: Did not vote, but would have voted to save Georgia & Giovanni

=== Week 12: Semi-final ===
Musical guest: Kylie Minogue — "I'm Gonna Be Warm This Winter"

Each couple performed two routines, and are listed in the order they performed.

Couple	Scores	Dance	Music	Result
Katie & Anton	25 (4, 7, 7, 7)	Charleston	"Too Darn Hot" — from Kiss Me, Kate	Bottom two
Katie & Anton	31 (8, 9, 7, 7)	Waltz	"O mio babbino caro" — Giacomo Puccini	Bottom two
Jay & Aliona	34 (8, 9, 8, 9)	Viennese waltz	"Have You Ever Really Loved a Woman?" — Bryan Adams	Safe
Jay & Aliona	37 (9, 9, 9, 10)	Charleston	"Doctor Jazz" — from Jelly's Last Jam	Safe
Georgia & Giovanni	33 (8, 8, 8, 9)	Cha-cha-cha	"I Will Survive" — Gloria Gaynor	Safe
Georgia & Giovanni	38 (9, 10, 9, 10)	Viennese waltz	"Runaway" — The Corrs	Safe
Anita & Gleb	32 (7, 8, 8, 9)	Foxtrot	"New York, New York" — Frank Sinatra	Eliminated
Anita & Gleb	32 (8, 8, 8, 8)	Salsa	"Feel This Moment" — Pitbull, feat. Christina Aguilera	Eliminated
Kellie & Kevin	34 (9, 8, 9, 8)	Rumba	"Songbird" — Eva Cassidy	Safe
Kellie & Kevin	39 (9, 10, 10, 10)	American Smooth	"Let's Face the Music and Dance" — Irving Berlin	Safe

Judges' votes to save

- Horwood: Anita & Gleb
- Bussell: Katie & Anton
- Tonioli: Katie & Anton
- Goodman: Katie & Anton

=== Week 13: Final ===
Musical guest: Ellie Goulding — "Love Me like You Do"

During the first show, each couple performed two routines, one of which was their showdance routine and the other chosen by the judges. At the beginning of the second show, the couple with the lowest public vote was eliminated. During the second show, each couple performed their favourite dance of the series. Couples are listed in the order they performed.

Show 1

Couple	Scores	Dance	Music	Result
Jay & Aliona	36 (9, 9, 9, 9)	Quickstep	"My Generation" — The Who	Safe
Jay & Aliona	35 (8, 9, 9, 9)	Showdance	"Can't Feel My Face" — The Weeknd	Safe
Georgia & Giovanni	36 (9, 9, 9, 9)	Rumba	"Writing's on the Wall" — from Spectre	Safe
Georgia & Giovanni	36 (9, 9, 9, 9)	Showdance	"Fix You" — Coldplay	Safe
Kellie & Kevin	40 (10, 10, 10, 10)	Tango	"You Really Got Me" — The Kinks	Safe
Kellie & Kevin	40 (10, 10, 10, 10)	Showdance	"The Ding-Dong Daddy of the D-Car Line" — Cherry Poppin' Daddies	Safe
Katie & Anton	31 (7, 8, 8, 8)	Quickstep	"42nd Street" — from 42nd Street	Fourth place
Katie & Anton	31 (7, 8, 8, 8)	Showdance	"O Fortuna" — Carl Orff	Fourth place

Show 2

Couple	Scores	Dance	Music	Result
Jay & Aliona	39 (9, 10, 10, 10)	Paso doble	"It's My Life" — Bon Jovi	Winners
Georgia & Giovanni	40 (10, 10, 10, 10)	Charleston	"Hot Honey Rag" — from Chicago	Runners-up
Kellie & Kevin	39 (9, 10, 10, 10)	Charleston	"Cantina Band" — from Star Wars	Runners-up

== Dance chart ==
The couples performed the following each week:

- Weeks 1–9: One unlearned dance
- Week 10: One unlearned dance & quickstep marathon
- Week 11: One unlearned dance
- Week 12: Two unlearned dances
- Week 13 (Show 1): Judges' choice & showdance
- Week 13 (Show 2): Favourite dance of the series

Strictly Come Dancing (series 13) - Dance chart
Couple	Week																
Couple	1	2	3	4	5	6	7	8	9	10		11	12		13		
Jay & Aliona	Cha-cha-cha	Waltz	Jive	Quickstep	Paso doble	American Smooth	Argentine tango	Foxtrot	Salsa	Tango	Quickstep; Marathon	Rumba	Viennese waltz	Charleston	Quickstep	Showdance	Paso doble
Georgia & Giovanni	Jive	Waltz	Rumba	Quickstep	Salsa	Tango	Samba	Charleston	American Smooth	Paso doble	Quickstep; Marathon	Foxtrot	Cha-cha-cha	Viennese waltz	Rumba	Showdance	Charleston
Kellie & Kevin	Tango	Cha-cha-cha	Charleston	Foxtrot	Jive	Paso doble	Waltz	Samba	Quickstep	Salsa	Quickstep; Marathon	Viennese waltz	Rumba	American Smooth	Tango	Showdance	Charleston
Katie & Anton	Jive	Tango	Cha-cha-cha	Viennese waltz	Salsa	Paso doble	Quickstep	Rumba	American Smooth	Argentine tango	Quickstep; Marathon	Foxtrot	Charleston	Waltz	Quickstep	Showdance	
Anita & Gleb	Cha-cha-cha	Charleston	American Smooth	Samba	Tango	Waltz	Jive	Quickstep	Paso doble	Rumba	Quickstep; Marathon	Argentine tango	Foxtrot	Salsa			
Helen & Aljaž	Waltz	Cha-cha-cha	Foxtrot	Salsa	Quickstep	Samba	Rumba	Tango	Charleston	Viennese waltz	Quickstep; Marathon	Paso doble					
Peter & Janette	Cha-cha-cha	Quickstep	Paso doble	Tango	Rumba	Foxtrot	Charleston	Viennese waltz	Jive	American Smooth	Quickstep; Marathon						
Jamelia & Tristan	Waltz	Cha-cha-cha	Salsa	Charleston	Foxtrot	Jive	Viennese waltz	Samba	Quickstep								
Jeremy & Karen	Cha-cha-cha	American Smooth	Charleston	Jive	Waltz	Salsa	Tango	Quickstep									
Carol & Pasha	Cha-cha-cha	Foxtrot	Quickstep	Paso doble	Viennese waltz	Rumba	American Smooth										
Kirsty & Brendan	Waltz	Salsa	American Smooth	Paso doble	Viennese waltz	Charleston											
Ainsley & Natalie	Tango	Salsa	Cha-cha-cha	Waltz	Jive												
Daniel & Kristina	Waltz	Charleston	Cha-cha-cha	American Smooth													
Anthony & Oti	Jive	Waltz	Paso doble														
Iwan & Ola	Tango	Cha-cha-cha															

== Ratings ==
Weekly ratings for each show on BBC One. All ratings are provided by BARB.

Episode	Date	Official rating (millions)	Weekly rank for BBC One	Weekly rank for all UK TV	Share
Launch show	5 September	9.78	2	2	41.7%
Week 1 (Night 1)	25 September	9.22	3	3	36.4%
Week 1 (Night 2)	26 September	9.31	2	2	39.7%
Week 2	3 October	9.27	2	2	38.0%
Week 2 results	4 October	8.48	3	3	33.2%
Week 3	10 October	10.38	2	2	43.5%
Week 3 results	11 October	8.68	4	4	33.1%
Week 4	17 October	10.85	1	1	45.7%
Week 4 results	18 October	9.46	2	2	35.9%
Week 5	24 October	10.42	1	1	42.5%
Week 5 results	25 October	9.33	2	2	35.8%
Week 6	31 October	10.85	1	1	45.9%
Week 6 results	1 November	10.24	2	2	40.8%
Week 7	7 November	10.77	2	2	44.2%
Week 7 results	8 November	10.87	1	1	43.0%
Week 8	14 November	11.71	1	1	45.8%
Week 8 results	15 November	10.94	2	2	43.5%
Week 9	21 November	11.77	1	1	44.7%
Week 9 results	22 November	11.25	2	2	45.2%
Week 10	28 November	11.55	1	1	45.3%
Week 10 results	29 November	10.92	2	2	43.2%
Week 11	5 December	11.93	1	1	45.1%
Week 11 results	6 December	11.07	2	2	43.0%
Week 12	12 December	10.96	2	2	43.1%
Week 12 results	13 December	11.40	1	1	43.8%
Week 13	19 December	12.23	2	2	50.1%
Week 13 results	19 December	12.47	1	1	48.4%
Series average (excl. launch show)	2015	10.63	—N/a	—N/a	42.3%
