= Strictly Come Dancing series 15 =

Strictly Come Dancing
- Series 15
- Presented by: Tess Daly; Claudia Winkleman
- Judges: Shirley Ballas; Darcey Bussell; Craig Revel Horwood; Bruno Tonioli
- Celebrity winner: Joe McFadden
- Professional winner: Katya Jones
- No. of episodes: 25

Release
- Original network: BBC One
- Original release: 9 September – 16 December 2017

Series chronology
- ← Previous; Series 14 Next → Series 16

Strictly Come Dancing returned for its fifteenth series in 2017 with a launch show on 9 September on BBC One, and live shows starting on 23 September. Tess Daly and Claudia Winkleman returned as hosts, while Zoe Ball returned to host Strictly Come Dancing: It Takes Two on BBC Two.

Darcey Bussell, Craig Revel Horwood, and Bruno Tonioli returned as judges. On 9 May 2017, it was announced that Len Goodman, who had retired from the show at the end of the previous series, would be replaced by Shirley Ballas. Tonioli missed the week 5 episode due to a scheduling conflict, but was not replaced by a guest judge.

Holby City actor Joe McFadden and Katya Jones were announced as the winners on 16 December; while Gemma Atkinson and Aljaž Škorjanec, Debbie McGee and Giovanni Pernice, and Alexandra Burke and Gorka Márquez were the runners-up.

== Format ==
Hosts and Judges for Strictly Come Dancing Series 15

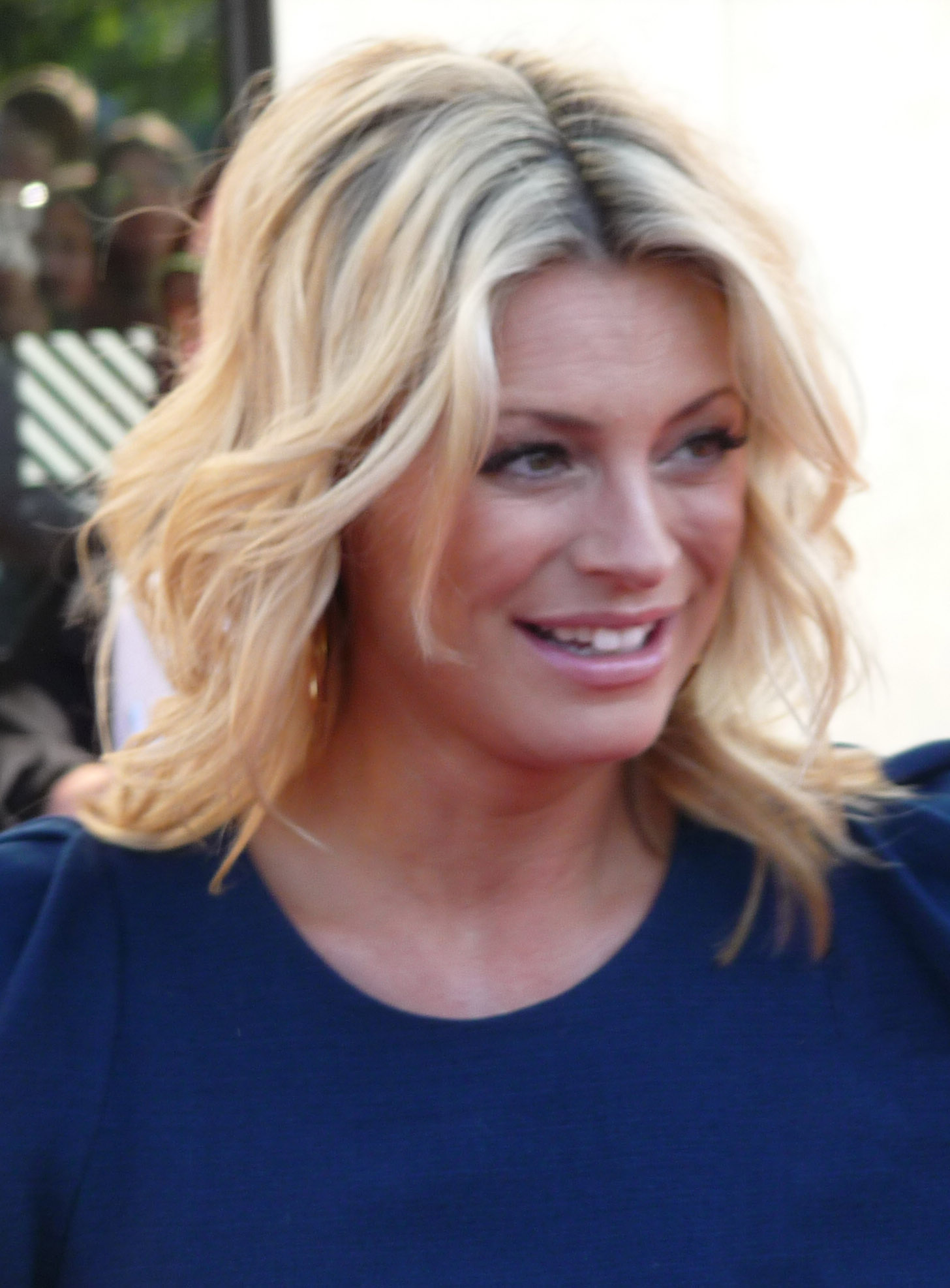
Tess Daly

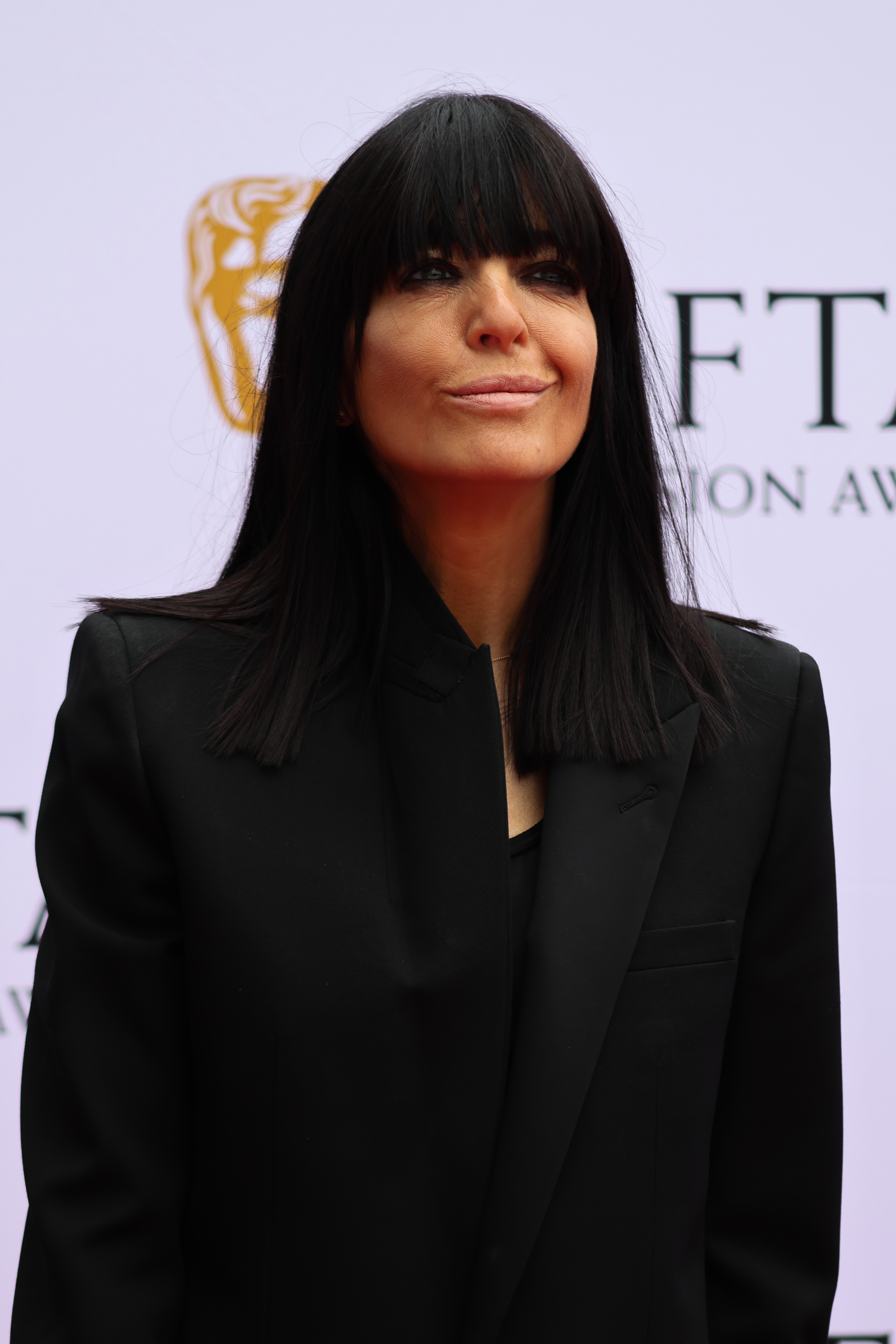
Claudia Winkleman

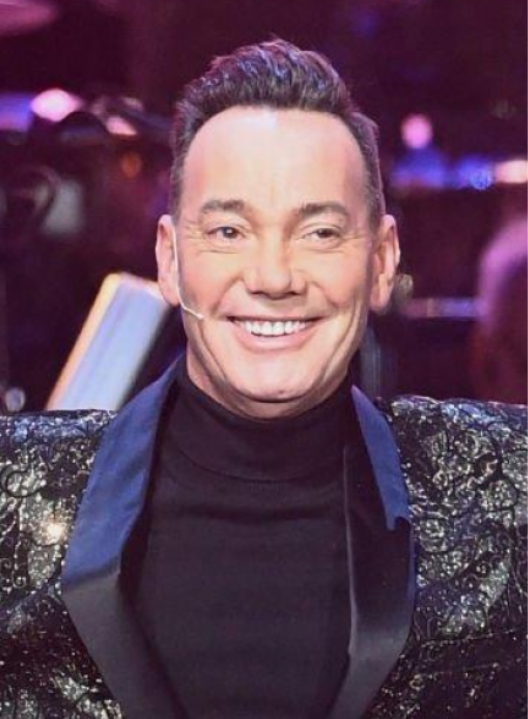
Craig Revel Horwood

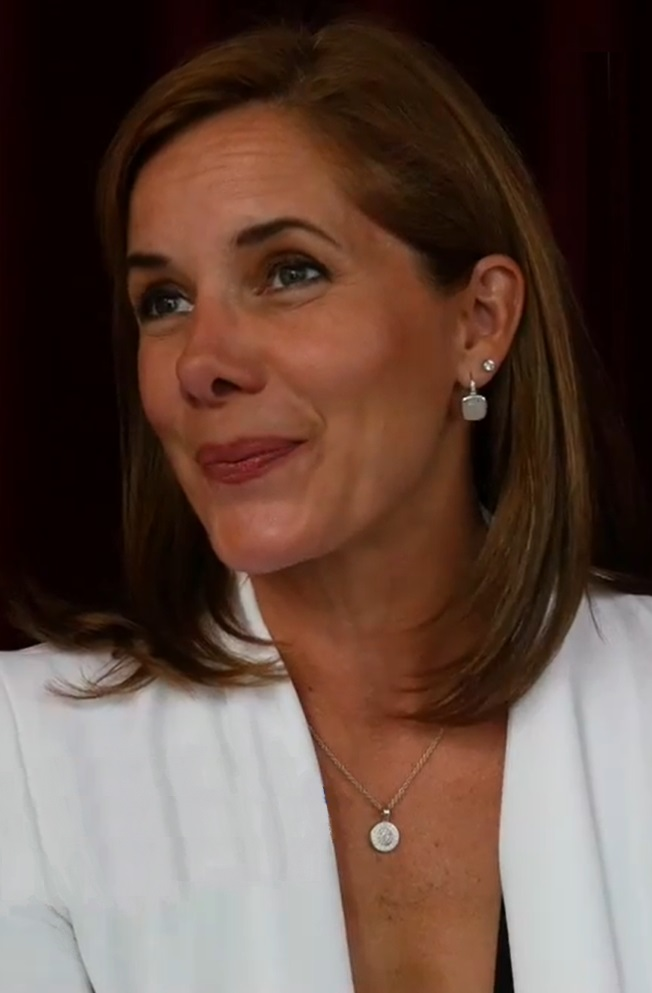
Darcey Bussell

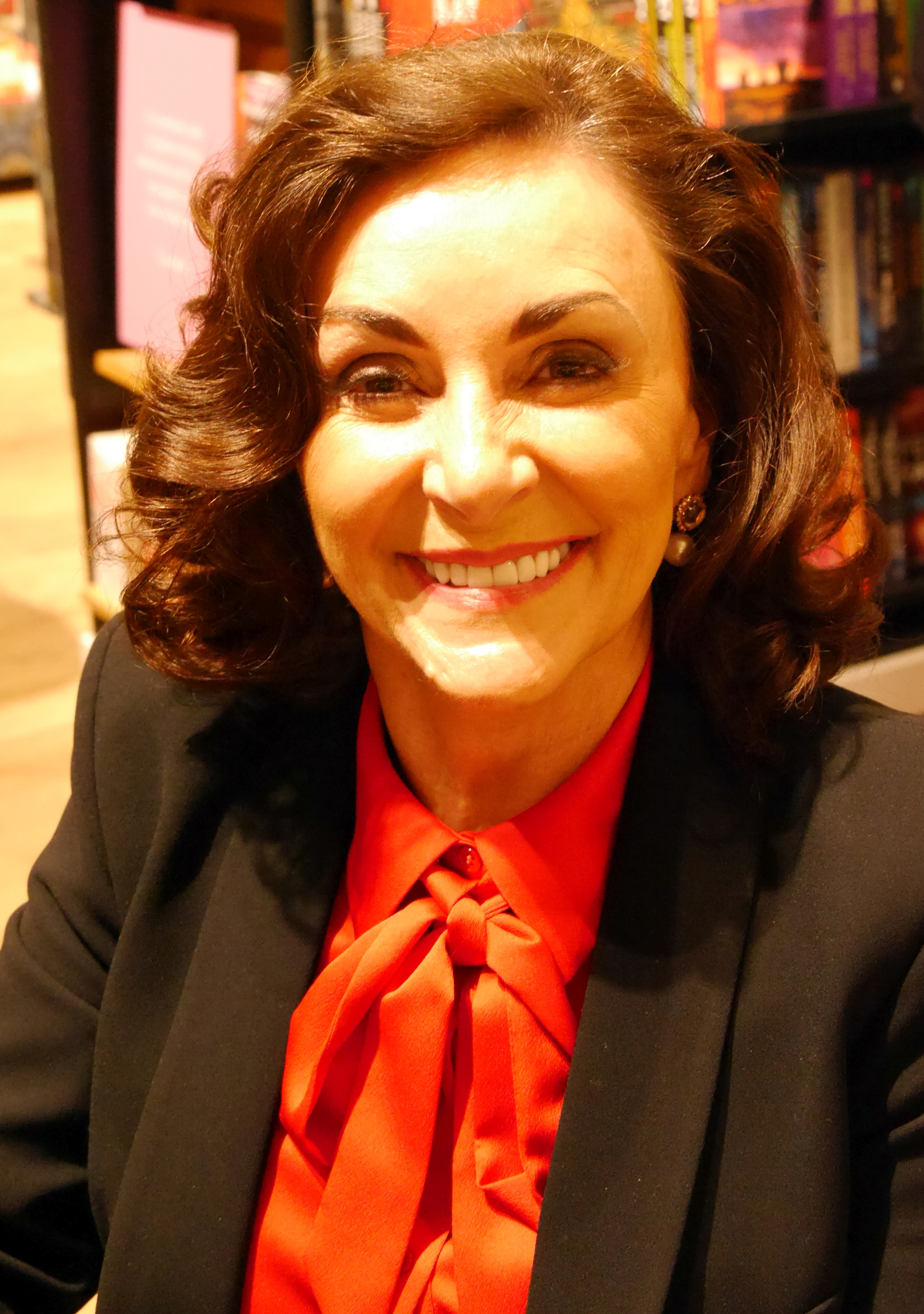
Shirley Ballas

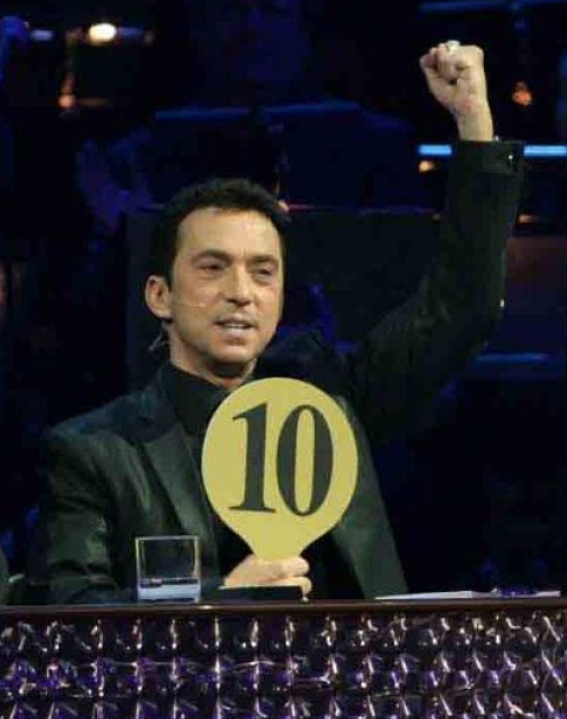
Bruno Tonioli

The couples dance each week in a live show. The judges score each performance out of ten. The couples are then ranked according to the judges' scores and given points according to their rank, with the lowest scored couple receiving one point, and the highest scored couple receiving the most points (the maximum number of points available depends on the number of couples remaining in the competition). The public are also invited to vote for their favourite couples, and the couples are ranked again according to the number of votes they receive, again receiving points; the couple with the fewest votes receiving one point, and the couple with the most votes receiving the most points.

The points for judges' score and public vote are then added together, and the two couples with the fewest points are placed in the bottom two. If two couples have equal points, the points from the public vote are given precedence. As with the previous series, the bottom two couples have to perform a dance-off on the results show. Based on that performance alone, each judge then votes on which couple should stay and which couple should leave, with Shirley Ballas, as head judge, having the last and deciding vote.

== Professional dancers ==
On 21 June 2017, the list of professionals returning for the fifteenth series was revealed. Professionals from the last series who did not return included Joanne Clifton, Natalie Lowe, and Oksana Platero. They were replaced by former Dancing with the Stars Australia professional Dianne Buswell, Nadiya Bychkova, and Amy Dowden. This series saw the final appearance of professional dancer Brendan Cole.

== Couples ==
In the fifteenth series, there were fifteen celebrity contestants. On 7 August 2017, the first celebrity announced to be participating in the series was The Saturdays singer Mollie King. Celebrity reveals continued through the month with the line-up fully announced on The One Show on 21 August 2017.

Celebrity	Notability	Professional partner	Status
Chizzy Akudolu	Holby City actress & comedian	Pasha Kovalev	Eliminated 1st on 1 October 2017
Rev. Richard Coles	Broadcaster, musician & Church of England priest	Dianne Buswell	Eliminated 2nd on 8 October 2017
Charlotte Hawkins	Good Morning Britain presenter & journalist	Brendan Cole	Eliminated 3rd on 15 October 2017
Brian Conley	Comedian, singer & actor	Amy Dowden	Eliminated 4th on 22 October 2017
Simon Rimmer	Chef & Sunday Brunch presenter	Karen Clifton	Eliminated 5th on 29 October 2017
Aston Merrygold	JLS singer	Janette Manrara	Eliminated 6th on 5 November 2017
Ruth Langsford	Television presenter	Anton Du Beke	Eliminated 7th on 12 November 2017
Jonnie Peacock	Paralympic sprinter	Oti Mabuse	Eliminated 8th on 19 November 2017
Susan Calman	Stand-up comedian & television presenter	Kevin Clifton	Eliminated 9th on 26 November 2017
Davood Ghadami	EastEnders actor	Nadiya Bychkova	Eliminated 10th on 3 December 2017
Mollie King	The Saturdays singer	AJ Pritchard	Eliminated 11th on 10 December 2017
Alexandra Burke	Singer-songwriter	Gorka Márquez	Runners-up on 16 December 2017
Debbie McGee	Radio presenter & magician's assistant	Giovanni Pernice	Runners-up on 16 December 2017
Gemma Atkinson	Actress & model	Aljaž Škorjanec	Runners-up on 16 December 2017
Joe McFadden	Holby City actor	Katya Jones	Winners on 16 December 2017

== Scoring chart ==
The highest score each week is indicated in bold green with a dagger (†), while the lowest score each week is indicated in italicized red with a double-dagger (‡).

Color key:

Winners
Runners-up
Bottom two
Eliminated

Strictly Come Dancing (series 15) - Weekly scores
Couple	Pl.	Week													
Couple	Pl.	1	2	1+2	3	4	5 (Note: The couples were judged on a 30-point scale due to the absence of Bruno Tonioli.)	6	7	8	9	10	11	12	13
Joe & Katya	1st	29	22	51	32	24	26	32	36	33	34	38+6=**44**†	37	35+35=70	39+39+40=118 (Note: This couple finished in first place.)
Alexandra & Gorka	2nd	24	**36**†	60	33	**39**†	23	35	39	**38**†	**39**†	32+7=39 (Note: This couple was in the bottom two, but was not eliminated.)	**39**†	39+40=**79**†	40+39+40=**119**† (Note: This couple finished in second place.)
Debbie & Giovanni	2nd	30	34	**64**†	29	27	**27**†	**39**†	**40**†	35	33	38+5=43	**39**†	34+36=70	39+38+40=117
Gemma & Aljaž	2nd	20	26	46	31	35	24	30	26	28	38	25+3=28	29‡	30+32=62	38+37+39=114‡
Mollie & AJ	5th	23	25	48	30	27	24	27	27	22	29	31+2=33	31	24+32=56‡ (Note: This couple was eliminated.)	
Davood & Nadiya	6th	27	27	54	25	29	22	25	35	**38**†	35	35+4=39	29‡		
Susan & Kevin	7th	20	22	42	20	30	16‡	18	29	27	25‡	21+1=22‡			
Jonnie & Oti	8th	20	29	49	26	31	24	20	27	21	26				
Ruth & Anton	9th	16‡	20	36	15	24	16‡	22	22‡	18‡					
Aston & Janette	10th	**31**†	32	63	**35**†	32	24	38	25						
Simon & Karen	11th	17	19	36	19	19‡	16‡	16‡							
Brian & Amy	12th	16‡	19	35	22	21	16‡								
Charlotte & Brendan	13th	22	12‡	34‡	17	19‡									
Rev. Richard & Dianne	14th	17	17	34‡	14‡										
Chizzy & Pasha	15th	21	16	37											

=== Average chart ===
This table only counts for dances scored on a traditional 40-point scale. Scores from Week 5, which were judged on a 30-point scale, have been scaled up accordingly.

Couple	Rank by average	Total points	Number of dances	Total average
Alexandra & Gorka	1st	583	16	36.4
Debbie & Giovanni	2nd	567	16	35.4
Joe & Katya	3rd	540	16	33.8
Aston & Janette	4th	225	7	32.1
Gemma & Aljaž	5th	496	16	31.0
Davood & Nadiya	6th	334	11	30.4
Mollie & AJ	7th	360	13	27.7
Jonnie & Oti	8th	232	9	25.8
Susan & Kevin	9th	233	10	23.3
Brian & Amy	10th	99	5	19.8
Ruth & Anton	10th	158	8	19.8
Chizzy & Pasha	12th	37	2	18.5
Simon & Karen	12th	111	6	18.5
Charlotte & Brendan	14th	70	4	17.5
Rev. Richard & Dianne	15th	48	3	16.0

== Weekly scores ==
Unless indicated otherwise, individual judges' scores in the charts below (given in parentheses) are listed in this order from left to right: Craig Revel Horwood, Darcey Bussell, Shirley Ballas, Bruno Tonioli.

=== Launch show ===
Musical guests:

- Shania Twain – "Life's About to Get Good"
- Rita Ora – "Lonely Together"

During the show, the professional dancers performed a tribute to former host Sir Bruce Forsyth, who had died just weeks before the series began.

=== Week 1 ===
There was no elimination this week; all scores and votes carried over to the following week. Couples are listed in the order they performed.

Couple	Scores	Dance	Music
Gemma & Aljaž	20 (4, 5, 5, 6)	Cha-cha-cha	"There's Nothing Holdin' Me Back" — Shawn Mendes
Brian & Amy	16 (3, 4, 4, 5)	Tango	"Temptation" — Heaven 17
Alexandra & Gorka	24 (5, 6, 6, 7)	Waltz	"(You Make Me Feel Like) A Natural Woman" — Aretha Franklin
Simon & Karen	17 (3, 5, 5, 4)	Paso doble	"Song 2" — Blur
Charlotte & Brendan	22 (5, 5, 6, 6)	Foxtrot	"The Best Is Yet to Come" — Michael Bublé
Chizzy & Pasha	21 (4, 5, 6, 6)	Cha-cha-cha	"Boogie Fever" — The Sylvers
Jonnie & Oti	20 (4, 5, 5, 6)	Waltz	"When I Need You" — Luther Vandross
Joe & Katya	29 (7, 7, 8, 7)	Jive	"Rockin' Robin" — Michael Jackson
Susan & Kevin	20 (5, 5, 5, 5)	Viennese waltz	"Mad About the Boy" — Dinah Washington
Debbie & Giovanni	30 (8, 8, 7, 7)	Paso doble	"Be Italian" — Fergie
Davood & Nadiya	27 (6, 7, 7, 7)	Cha-cha-cha	"Dedication to My Ex (Miss That)" — Lloyd, feat. André 3000
Ruth & Anton	16 (3, 4, 4, 5)	Waltz	"This Nearly Was Mine" — Seth MacFarlane
Rev. Richard & Dianne	17 (2, 4, 6, 5)	Cha-cha-cha	"There Must Be an Angel (Playing with My Heart)" — Eurythmics
Mollie & AJ	23 (4, 6, 7, 6)	Jive	"Good Golly, Miss Molly" — Little Richard
Aston & Janette	31 (7, 8, 8, 8)	Foxtrot	"It Had to Be You" — Harry Connick Jr.

=== Week 2 ===
Musical guest: Emeli Sandé — "Starlight"

Couples are listed in the order they performed.

Couple	Scores	Dance	Music	Result
Chizzy & Pasha	16 (3, 5, 4, 4)	Foxtrot	"I'm a Woman" — from Smokey Joe's Cafe	Eliminated
Aston & Janette	32 (7, 8, 8, 9)	Salsa	"Despacito" — Luis Fonsi & Daddy Yankee, feat. Justin Bieber	Safe
Susan & Kevin	22 (3, 6, 7, 6)	Charleston	"If You Knew Susie" — Enoch Light & The Charleston City All-Stars	Safe
Charlotte & Brendan	12 (2, 4, 3, 3)	Cha-cha-cha	"Sugar" — Maroon 5	Safe
Joe & Katya	22 (5, 6, 5, 6)	Tango	"Castle on the Hill" — Ed Sheeran	Safe
Brian & Amy	19 (3, 5, 5, 6)	Cha-cha-cha	"Shake Your Groove Thing" — Peaches & Herb	Bottom two
Gemma & Aljaž	26 (6, 6, 7, 7)	Waltz	"Un Giorno Per Noi (A Time for Us)" — Josh Groban	Safe
Rev. Richard & Dianne	17 (3, 4, 5, 5)	American Smooth	"Love Really Hurts Without You" — Billy Ocean	Safe
Ruth & Anton	20 (3, 5, 6, 6)	Charleston	"The Charleston" — Bob Wilson and his Varsity Rhythm Boys	Safe
Simon & Karen	19 (4, 4, 6, 5)	Waltz	"You'll Never Walk Alone" — Rodgers and Hammerstein	Safe
Mollie & AJ	25 (4, 6, 8, 7)	Tango	"Addicted to Love" — Tina Turner	Safe
Jonnie & Oti	29 (6, 7, 8, 8)	Jive	"Johnny B. Goode" — Chuck Berry	Safe
Debbie & Giovanni	34 (8, 9, 9, 8)	Viennese waltz	"She's Always a Woman" — Billy Joel	Safe
Davood & Nadiya	27 (6, 7, 7, 7)	Quickstep	"Last Nite" — The Strokes	Safe
Alexandra & Gorka	36 (9, 9, 9, 9)	Paso doble	"Ven a Bailar" — Jennifer Lopez	Safe

Judges' votes to save

- Horwood: Chizzy & Pasha
- Bussell: Brian & Amy
- Tonioli: Brian & Amy
- Ballas: Brian & Amy

=== Week 3: Movie Week ===
Musical guest: Sheridan Smith — "My Man"

Couples are listed in the order they performed.

Couple	Scores	Dance	Music	Film	Result
Simon & Karen	19 (3, 5, 6, 5)	Quickstep	"You've Got a Friend in Me"	Toy Story	Bottom two
Ruth & Anton	15 (3, 5, 3, 4)	Rumba	"Diamonds Are Forever"	Diamonds Are Forever	Safe
Mollie & AJ	30 (7, 7, 8, 8)	American Smooth	"Climb Ev'ry Mountain"	The Sound of Music	Safe
Rev. Richard & Dianne	14 (2, 4, 4, 4)	Paso doble	"Flash's Theme"	Flash Gordon	Eliminated
Debbie & Giovanni	29 (6, 8, 7, 8)	Quickstep	"Let's Call the Whole Thing Off"	Shall We Dance	Safe
Brian & Amy	22 (5, 5, 6, 6)	American Smooth	"If I Only Had a Brain"	The Wizard of Oz	Safe
Gemma & Aljaž	31 (7, 8, 8, 8)	Charleston	"The Bare Necessities"	The Jungle Book	Safe
Charlotte & Brendan	17 (4, 5, 4, 4)	Tango	"Danger Zone"	Top Gun	Safe
Jonnie & Oti	26 (6, 6, 7, 7)	Paso doble	"The Raiders March"	Raiders of the Lost Ark	Safe
Susan & Kevin	20 (4, 5, 5, 6)	Samba	"Wonder Woman Theme"	Wonder Woman	Safe
Joe & Katya	32 (8, 8, 8, 8)	Viennese waltz	"Somewhere My Love"	Doctor Zhivago	Safe
Aston & Janette	35 (8, 9, 9, 9)	Cha-cha-cha	"Can't Stop the Feeling!"	Trolls	Safe
Alexandra & Gorka	33 (8, 8, 8, 9)	American Smooth	"Wouldn't It Be Loverly"	My Fair Lady	Safe
Davood & Nadiya	25 (4, 7, 7, 7)	Samba	"Stayin' Alive"	Saturday Night Fever	Safe

Judges' votes to save

- Horwood: Simon & Karen
- Bussell: Simon & Karen
- Tonioli: Simon & Karen
- Ballas: Did not vote, but would have voted to save Simon & Karen

=== Week 4 ===
Musical guest: Gregory Porter — "Smile"

Couples are listed in the order they performed.

Couple	Scores	Dance	Music	Result
Debbie & Giovanni	27 (6, 6, 7, 8)	Cha-cha-cha	"The Shoop Shoop Song (It's in His Kiss)" — Cher	Safe
Brian & Amy	21 (4, 6, 6, 5)	Paso doble	"I Believe in a Thing Called Love" — The Darkness	Safe
Mollie & AJ	27 (6, 7, 7, 7)	Salsa	"Súbeme la Radio" — Enrique Iglesias	Safe
Davood & Nadiya	29 (6, 7, 8, 8)	Viennese waltz	"Say You Love Me" — Jessie Ware	Bottom two
Charlotte & Brendan	19 (4, 5, 5, 5)	Jive	"Marry You" — Bruno Mars	Eliminated
Joe & Katya	24 (5, 7, 6, 6)	Cha-cha-cha	"You Keep Me Hangin' On" — Human Nature	Safe
Ruth & Anton	24 (6, 6, 6, 6)	Tango	"Allegretto" — Bond	Safe
Aston & Janette	32 (7, 8, 8, 9)	Quickstep	"Mr. Blue Sky" — Electric Light Orchestra	Safe
Simon & Karen	19 (4, 5, 5, 5)	Samba	"Copacabana" — Barry Manilow	Safe
Gemma & Aljaž	35 (8, 9, 9, 9)	Paso doble	"Viva la Vida" — Coldplay	Safe
Alexandra & Gorka	39 (9, 10, 10, 10)	Jive	"Proud Mary" — Tina Turner	Safe
Jonnie & Oti	31 (7, 8, 8, 8)	American Smooth	"Cry Me a River" — Michael Bublé	Safe
Susan & Kevin	30 (7, 7, 8, 8)	Quickstep	"Bring Me Sunshine" — The Jive Aces	Safe

Judges' votes to save

- Horwood: Davood & Nadiya
- Bussell: Davood & Nadiya
- Tonioli: Davood & Nadiya
- Ballas: Did not vote, but would have voted to save Davood & Nadiya

=== Week 5 ===
Individual judges' scores given in the chart below (given in parentheses) are listed in this order from left to right: Craig Revel Horwood, Darcey Bussell, Shirley Ballas.

Musical guest: The Script — "Arms Open"

Couples are listed in the order they performed.

Couple	Scores	Dance	Music	Result
Davood & Nadiya	22 (6, 8, 8)	Jive	"Tell Her About It" — Billy Joel	Safe
Mollie & AJ	24 (8, 8, 8)	Viennese waltz	"Anyone Who Had a Heart" — Cilla Black	Safe
Simon & Karen	16 (5, 5, 6)	Charleston	"Fit as a Fiddle (And Ready for Love)" — Gene Kelly	Bottom two
Debbie & Giovanni	27 (9, 9, 9)	Rumba	"Baby Can I Hold You" — Tracy Chapman	Safe
Brian & Amy	16 (4, 6, 6)	Jive	"It's Not Unusual" — Tom Jones	Eliminated
Susan & Kevin	16 (4, 5, 7)	Cha-cha-cha	"Shout Out to My Ex" — Little Mix	Safe
Aston & Janette	24 (8, 8, 8)	Waltz	"Can't Help Falling in Love" — Mree	Safe
Ruth & Anton	16 (5, 5, 6)	Samba	"Love Is in the Air" — John Paul Young	Safe
Gemma & Aljaž	24 (8, 8, 8)	Foxtrot	"Believe" — Madilyn Bailey	Safe
Joe & Katya	26 (7, 9, 10)	Paso doble	"Diablo Rojo" — Rodrigo y Gabriela	Safe
Alexandra & Gorka	23 (7, 8, 8)	Samba	"Shape of You" — Ed Sheeran	Safe
Jonnie & Oti	24 (7, 8, 9)	Quickstep	"Part-Time Lover" — Stevie Wonder	Safe

Judges' votes to save

- Horwood: Simon & Karen
- Bussell: Simon & Karen
- Ballas: Did not vote, but would have voted to save Simon & Karen

=== Week 6: Halloween Week ===
Musical guest: Steps — "Scared of the Dark"

Couples are listed in the order they performed.

Couple	Scores	Dance	Music	Result
Jonnie & Oti	20 (4, 6, 5, 5)	Cha-cha-cha	"Troublemaker" — Olly Murs, feat. Flo Rida	Safe
Ruth & Anton	22 (4, 6, 6, 6)	Quickstep	"Bewitched Theme" — Steve Lawrence	Safe
Simon & Karen	16 (2, 5, 5, 4)	American Smooth	"Delilah" — Tom Jones	Eliminated
Gemma & Aljaž	30 (7, 8, 7, 8)	Jive	"Ever Fallen in Love (With Someone You Shouldn't've)" — Buzzcocks	Safe
Joe & Katya	32 (8, 8, 8, 8)	Foxtrot	"Trouble" — Coldplay	Safe
Mollie & AJ	27 (6, 7, 7, 7)	Cha-cha-cha	"Better the Devil You Know" — Kylie Minogue	Bottom two
Alexandra & Gorka	35 (9, 9, 9, 8)	Tango	"Maneater" — Nelly Furtado	Safe
Davood & Nadiya	25 (5, 7, 6, 7)	Rumba	"Wicked Game" — Chris Isaak	Safe
Susan & Kevin	18 (3, 5, 5, 5)	Foxtrot	"Killer Queen" — Queen	Safe
Debbie & Giovanni	39 (9, 10, 10, 10)	Charleston	"Frankie" — Sister Sledge	Safe
Aston & Janette	38 (9, 10, 9, 10)	Paso doble	"Smells Like Teen Spirit" — Nirvana	Safe

Judges' votes to save

- Horwood: Mollie & AJ
- Bussell: Mollie & AJ
- Tonioli: Mollie & AJ
- Ballas: Did not vote, but would have voted to save Mollie & AJ

=== Week 7 ===
Musical guest: Stereophonics — "Caught by the Wind"

Couples are listed in the order they performed.

Couple	Scores	Dance	Music	Result
Alexandra & Gorka	39 (9, 10, 10, 10)	Cha-cha-cha	"I've Got the Music in Me" — Marcia Hines	Safe
Mollie & AJ	27 (6, 7, 7, 7)	Foxtrot	"Call Me Irresponsible" — Connie Francis	Bottom two
Joe & Katya	36 (9, 9, 9, 9)	Charleston	"Alexander's Ragtime Band" — Ella Fitzgerald	Safe
Gemma & Aljaž	26 (5, 7, 7, 7)	Salsa	"Sun Comes Up" — Rudimental, feat. James Arthur	Safe
Aston & Janette	25 (4, 7, 7, 7)	Viennese waltz	"Who's Lovin' You" — The Jackson 5	Eliminated
Ruth & Anton	22 (4, 6, 6, 6)	Paso doble	"The Shady Dame from Seville" — Julie Andrews	Safe
Debbie & Giovanni	40 (10, 10, 10, 10)	Tango	"I Gotta Feeling" — The Black Eyed Peas	Safe
Jonnie & Oti	27 (6, 7, 7, 7)	Salsa	"Turn Me On" — Kevin Lyttle	Safe
Susan & Kevin	29 (6, 7, 8, 8)	Jive	"This Ole House" — Shakin' Stevens	Safe
Davood & Nadiya	35 (8, 9, 9, 9)	American Smooth	"This Will Be (An Everlasting Love)" — Natalie Cole	Safe

Judges' votes to save

- Horwood: Mollie & AJ
- Bussell: Aston & Janette
- Tonioli: Aston & Janette
- Ballas: Mollie & AJ (Since the other judges were not unanimous, Shirley Ballas, as head judge, made the final decision to save Mollie & AJ.)

=== Week 8 ===
Musical guest: Seal — "Autumn Leaves"

Couples are listed in the order they performed.

Couple	Scores	Dance	Music	Result
Susan & Kevin	27 (5, 6, 8, 8)	Tango	"Firework" — Katy Perry	Safe
Joe & Katya	33 (7, 8, 9, 9)	Rumba	"One" — U2 & Mary J. Blige	Safe
Ruth & Anton	18 (4, 5, 4, 5)	Foxtrot	"Mack the Knife" — Bobby Darin	Eliminated
Davood & Nadiya	38 (9, 9, 10, 10)	Charleston	"The Lambeth Walk" — Pasadena Roof Orchestra	Safe
Gemma & Aljaž	28 (7, 7, 7, 7)	Viennese waltz	"You Don't Have to Say You Love Me" — Brenda Lee	Safe
Alexandra & Gorka	38 (9, 9, 10, 10)	Argentine tango	"Mi Confesión" — Gotan Project	Safe
Mollie & AJ	22 (5, 6, 6, 5)	Paso doble	"Layla" — Derek and the Dominos	Safe
Jonnie & Oti	21 (4, 5, 6, 6)	Foxtrot	"Someone like You" — Adele	Bottom two
Debbie & Giovanni	35 (9, 9, 8, 9)	Salsa	"Can't Take My Eyes Off You" — Boys Town Gang	Safe

Judges' votes to save

- Horwood: Jonnie & Oti
- Bussell: Jonnie & Oti
- Tonioli: Jonnie & Oti
- Ballas: Did not vote, but would have voted to save Jonnie & Oti

=== Week 9: Blackpool Week ===
Musical guests:

- Tears for Fears — "Everybody Wants to Rule the World"
- Alfie Boe & Michael Ball — "New York, New York"

This week's episode was staged in the Tower Ballroom at the Blackpool Tower in Blackpool, Lancashire.

Couples are listed in the order they performed.

Couple	Scores	Dance	Music	Result
Mollie & AJ	29 (6, 7, 8, 8)	Charleston	"Wings" — Little Mix	Safe
Susan & Kevin	25 (5, 6, 7, 7)	Paso doble	"Scott & Fran's Paso Doble" — from Strictly Ballroom	Safe
Debbie & Giovanni	33 (7, 8, 9, 9)	Samba	"Wannabe" & "Who Do You Think You Are" — Spice Girls	Bottom two
Jonnie & Oti	26 (6, 7, 6, 7)	Tango	"Sweet Dreams (Are Made of This)" — Eurythmics	Eliminated
Gemma & Aljaž	38 (9, 9, 10, 10)	American Smooth	"Downtown" — Petula Clark	Safe
Davood & Nadiya	35 (8, 9, 9, 9)	Paso doble	"Live and Let Die" — Paul McCartney and Wings	Safe
Alexandra & Gorka	39 (9, 10, 10, 10)	Quickstep	"The Gold Diggers' Song (We're in the Money)" — from 42nd Street	Safe
Joe & Katya	34 (8, 8, 9, 9)	Salsa	"Ride on Time" — Black Box	Safe

Judges' votes to save

- Horwood: Debbie & Giovanni
- Bussell: Debbie & Giovanni
- Tonioli: Debbie & Giovanni
- Ballas: Did not vote, but would have voted to save Debbie & Giovanni

=== Week 10 ===
Musical guest: Kelly Clarkson — "Meaning of Life"

Couples are listed in the order they performed.

Couple	Scores	Dance	Music	Result
Joe & Katya	38 (9, 9, 10, 10)	Quickstep	"Jumpin' Jack" — Big Bad Voodoo Daddy	Safe
Alexandra & Gorka	32 (7, 8, 8, 9)	Rumba	"Halo" — Beyoncé	Bottom two
Gemma & Aljaž	25 (6, 6, 6, 7)	Samba	"The River of Dreams" — Billy Joel	Safe
Mollie & AJ	31 (7, 7, 8, 9)	Quickstep	"Umbrella" — The Baseballs	Safe
Davood & Nadiya	35 (8, 9, 9, 9)	Waltz	"With You I'm Born Again" — Billy Preston & Syreeta Wright	Safe
Debbie & Giovanni	38 (9, 9, 10, 10)	Argentine tango	"Por una Cabeza" — Carlos Gardel & Alfredo Le Pera	Safe
Susan & Kevin	21 (4, 6, 5, 6)	American Smooth	"Beyond the Sea" — Bobby Darin	Eliminated
Susan & Kevin	1	Paso doble-thon (Paso doble Marathon)	"España cañí" — Pascual Marquina Narro	
Mollie & AJ	2	Paso doble-thon (Paso doble Marathon)	"España cañí" — Pascual Marquina Narro	
Gemma & Aljaž	3	Paso doble-thon (Paso doble Marathon)	"España cañí" — Pascual Marquina Narro	
Davood & Nadiya	4	Paso doble-thon (Paso doble Marathon)	"España cañí" — Pascual Marquina Narro	
Debbie & Giovanni	5	Paso doble-thon (Paso doble Marathon)	"España cañí" — Pascual Marquina Narro	
Joe & Katya	6	Paso doble-thon (Paso doble Marathon)	"España cañí" — Pascual Marquina Narro	
Alexandra & Gorka	7	Paso doble-thon (Paso doble Marathon)	"España cañí" — Pascual Marquina Narro	

Judges' votes to save

- Horwood: Alexandra & Gorka
- Bussell: Alexandra & Gorka
- Tonioli: Alexandra & Gorka
- Ballas: Did not vote, but would have voted to save Alexandra & Gorka

=== Week 11: Musicals Week (Quarter-final) ===
Musical guests: Amber Riley, Beverley Knight & Cassidy Janson — "I'm Every Woman"

Couples are listed in the order they performed.

Couple	Scores	Dance	Music	Musical	Result
Gemma & Aljaž	29 (6, 7, 8, 8)	Quickstep	"Hello, Dolly!"	Hello, Dolly!	Safe
Mollie & AJ	31 (6, 7, 9, 9)	Rumba	"Hopelessly Devoted to You"	Grease	Safe
Joe & Katya	37 (9, 9, 9, 10)	Samba	"Money, Money"	Cabaret	Safe
Debbie & Giovanni	39 (9, 10, 10, 10)	American Smooth	"Memory"	Cats	Safe
Davood & Nadiya	29 (7, 8, 7, 7)	Argentine tango	"The Phantom of the Opera"	The Phantom of the Opera	Eliminated
Alexandra & Gorka	39 (9, 10, 10, 10)	Charleston	"Supercalifragilisticexpialidocious"	Mary Poppins	Bottom two

Judges' votes to save

- Horwood: Alexandra & Gorka
- Bussell: Alexandra & Gorka
- Tonioli: Alexandra & Gorka
- Ballas: Did not vote, but would have voted to save Alexandra & Gorka

=== Week 12: Semi-final ===
Musical guests: Craig David & Bastille — "I Know You"

Each couple performed two routines, and are listed in the order they performed.

Couple	Scores	Dance	Music	Result
Joe & Katya	35 (8, 9, 9, 9)	American Smooth	"Have You Met Miss Jones?" — Robbie Williams	Safe
Joe & Katya	35 (8, 9, 9, 9)	Argentine tango	"Human" — Rag'n'Bone Man	Safe
Alexandra & Gorka	39 (9, 10, 10, 10)	Viennese waltz	"Everybody Hurts" — R.E.M.	Safe
Alexandra & Gorka	40 (10, 10, 10, 10)	Salsa	"Finally" — CeCe Peniston	Safe
Mollie & AJ	24 (4, 7, 7, 6)	Samba	"Whenever, Wherever" — Shakira	Eliminated
Mollie & AJ	32 (8, 8, 8, 8)	Waltz	"Angel" — Sarah McLachlan	Eliminated
Gemma & Aljaž	30 (7, 8, 7, 8)	Rumba	"Beneath Your Beautiful" — Labrinth, feat. Emeli Sandé	Bottom two
Gemma & Aljaž	32 (8, 8, 8, 8)	Tango	"My Sharona" — Royal Blood	Bottom two
Debbie & Giovanni	34 (7, 9, 9, 9)	Jive	"I'm So Excited" — The Pointer Sisters	Safe
Debbie & Giovanni	36 (8, 9, 9, 10)	Foxtrot	"Isn't She Lovely" — Stevie Wonder	Safe

Judges' votes to save

- Horwood: Gemma & Aljaž
- Bussell: Gemma & Aljaž
- Tonioli: Gemma & Aljaž
- Ballas: Did not vote, but would have voted to save Gemma & Aljaž

=== Week 13: Final ===
Musical guest: Ed Sheeran — "Perfect"

Each couple performed three routines: one chosen by the judges, their favourite dance of the season, and their showdance routine. Couples are listed in the order they performed.

Couple	Scores	Dance	Music	Result
Alexandra & Gorka	40 (10, 10, 10, 10)	American Smooth	"Wouldn't It Be Loverly" — from My Fair Lady	Runners-up
Alexandra & Gorka	39 (9, 10, 10, 10)	Showdance	"There's No Business Like Show Business" — Ethel Merman	Runners-up
Alexandra & Gorka	40 (10, 10, 10, 10)	Jive	"Proud Mary" — Tina Turner	Runners-up
Debbie & Giovanni	39 (9, 10, 10, 10)	Salsa	"Can't Take My Eyes Off You" — Boys Town Gang	Runners-up
Debbie & Giovanni	38 (9, 9, 10, 10)	Showdance	"One Day I'll Fly Away" — Vaults	Runners-up
Debbie & Giovanni	40 (10, 10, 10, 10)	Argentine tango	"Por una Cabeza" — Carlos Gardel & Alfredo Le Pera	Runners-up
Gemma & Aljaž	38 (9, 9, 10, 10)	Paso doble	"Viva la Vida" — Coldplay	Runners-up
Gemma & Aljaž	37 (8, 9, 10, 10)	Showdance	"Show Me How You Burlesque" — Christina Aguilera	Runners-up
Gemma & Aljaž	39 (9, 10, 10, 10)	American Smooth	"Downtown" — Petula Clark	Runners-up
Joe & Katya	39 (9, 10, 10, 10)	Viennese waltz	"Somewhere My Love" — from Doctor Zhivago	Winners
Joe & Katya	39 (9, 10, 10, 10)	Showdance	"You Make My Dreams" — Hall & Oates	Winners
Joe & Katya	40 (10, 10, 10, 10)	Charleston	"Alexander's Ragtime Band" — Ella Fitzgerald	Winners

== Dance chart ==
- Week 1–9: One unlearned dance
- Week 10: One unlearned dance & paso doble marathon
- Week 11 (Quarter-final): One unlearned dance
- Week 12 (Semi-final): Two unlearned dances
- Week 13 (Final): Judges' choice, showdance & favourite dance of the series

Strictly Come Dancing (series 15) - Dance chart
Couple	Week																
Couple	1	2	3	4	5	6	7	8	9	10		11	12		13		
Joe & Katya	Jive	Tango	Viennese waltz	Cha-cha-cha	Paso doble	Foxtrot	Charleston	Rumba	Salsa	Quickstep	Paso doble Marathon	Samba	American Smooth	Argentine tango	Viennese waltz	Showdance	Charleston
Alexandra & Gorka	Waltz	Paso doble	American Smooth	Jive	Samba	Tango	Cha-cha-cha	Argentine tango	Quickstep	Rumba	Paso doble Marathon	Charleston	Viennese waltz	Salsa	American Smooth	Showdance	Jive
Debbie & Giovanni	Paso doble	Viennese waltz	Quickstep	Cha-cha-cha	Rumba	Charleston	Tango	Salsa	Samba	Argentine tango	Paso doble Marathon	American Smooth	Jive	Foxtrot	Salsa	Showdance	Argentine tango
Gemma & Aljaž	Cha-cha-cha	Waltz	Charleston	Paso doble	Foxtrot	Jive	Salsa	Viennese waltz	American Smooth	Samba	Paso doble Marathon	Quickstep	Rumba	Tango	Paso doble	Showdance	American Smooth
Mollie & AJ	Jive	Tango	American Smooth	Salsa	Viennese waltz	Cha-cha-cha	Foxtrot	Paso doble	Charleston	Quickstep	Paso doble Marathon	Rumba	Samba	Waltz			
Davood & Nadiya	Cha-cha-cha	Quickstep	Samba	Viennese waltz	Jive	Rumba	American Smooth	Charleston	Paso doble	Waltz	Paso doble Marathon	Argentine tango					
Susan & Kevin	Viennese waltz	Charleston	Samba	Quickstep	Cha-cha-cha	Foxtrot	Jive	Tango	Paso doble	American Smooth	Paso doble Marathon						
Jonnie & Oti	Waltz	Jive	Paso doble	American Smooth	Quickstep	Cha-cha-cha	Salsa	Foxtrot	Tango								
Ruth & Anton	Waltz	Charleston	Rumba	Tango	Samba	Quickstep	Paso doble	Foxtrot									
Aston & Janette	Foxtrot	Salsa	Cha-cha-cha	Quickstep	Waltz	Paso doble	Viennese waltz										
Simon & Karen	Paso doble	Waltz	Quickstep	Samba	Charleston	American Smooth											
Brian & Amy	Tango	Cha-cha-cha	American Smooth	Paso doble	Jive												
Charlotte & Brendan	Foxtrot	Cha-cha-cha	Tango	Jive													
Rev. Richard & Dianne	Cha-cha-cha	American Smooth	Paso doble														
Chizzy & Pasha	Cha-cha-cha	Foxtrot															

== Ratings ==
Weekly ratings for each show on BBC One. All ratings are provided by BARB.

Episode	Date	Official rating (millions)	Weekly rank for BBC One	Weekly rank for all UK TV	Share
Launch show	9 September	10.29	1	1	44.7%
Week 1	23 September	11.04	1	1	46.9%
Week 2	30 September	10.79	1	1	44.9%
Week 2 results	1 October	9.33	2	2	37.2%
Week 3	7 October	11.15	1	1	48.0%
Week 3 results	8 October	9.64	3	3	39.5%
Week 4	14 October	11.26	1	1	48.4%
Week 4 results	15 October	10.10	2	2	41.7%
Week 5	21 October	11.49	1	1	49.7%
Week 5 results	22 October	9.83	2	2	38.9%
Week 6	28 October	12.28	2	2	51.0%
Week 6 results	29 October	10.23	3	3	40.2%
Week 7	4 November	11.96	2	2	51.3%
Week 7 results	5 November	10.63	3	3	44.0%
Week 8	11 November	11.74	2	2	48.1%
Week 8 results	12 November	11.46	3	3	44.3%
Week 9	18 November	12.05	2	3	49.0%
Week 9 results	19 November	11.39	3	4	46.0%
Week 10	25 November	11.29	2	2	44.2%
Week 10 results	26 November	11.08	3	4	44.0%
Week 11	2 December	11.11	2	2	44.5%
Week 11 results	3 December	10.94	3	3	43.7%
Week 12	9 December	11.73	3	3	48.2%
Week 12 results	10 December	11.76	2	2	46.6%
Week 13	16 December	13.01	1	1	55.9%
Series average (excl. launch show)	2017	11.14	—N/a	—N/a	45.7%
