= Jowita Przystał =

Polish dancer

- Born: 22 August 1994 (age 32); Kraków, Poland
- Occupation: Dancer
- Known for: Strictly Come Dancing The Greatest Dancer
- Height: 5 ft 0 in (1.52 m)

Jowita Maria Przystał (born 22 August 1994) is a Polish ballroom dancer. She is known for appearing on and winning both The Greatest Dancer in 2020 and Strictly Come Dancing in 2022, becoming the first female Strictly Professional to win in her first year with a partner and has been a professional on Strictly Come Dancing since 2021.

== Career ==
Przystał and her partner Michael Danilczuk have represented Poland in national and international competitions. In 2014 they became Polish Open Latin Champions. They have also performed with Burn the Floor. Przystał and Danilczuk have also performed in Broadway musical productions such as Legally Blonde, Priscilla, Queen of the Desert and Rock of Ages. They moved to London in 2019 to pursue careers in the United Kingdom. In 2020, Przystał and Danilczuk appeared on The Greatest Dancer. They were crowned winners of the second series. The prize was £50,000 and an opportunity to perform on the next series of BBC One's Strictly Come Dancing. They appeared on Week 6 of the eighteenth series of Strictly, in November 2020, as the guest dancers during the musical interlude. In September 2021, Przystał joined the nineteenth series of Strictly Come Dancing as a professional.

She appeared in group dances in her first year. In her second year on the show, she was partnered with Hamza Yassin and they won that series.

== Strictly Come Dancing ==
Przystał started her Strictly career in the nineteenth series, but was not partnered with a celebrity, only appearing in group dances. For the twentieth series, she received her first celebrity partner, cameraman and presenter Hamza Yassin. On 17 December 2022, they were announced the series champions, after beating Helen Skelton and Gorka Marquez, Fleur East and Vito Coppola, and Molly Rainford and Carlos Gu in the final. She is the fifth professional dancer and first ever female pro dancer to win their first series with a celebrity partner.

She has reached the semi-final twice, first with Hamza Yassin, and secondly with Pete Wicks, with the latter being the last celebrity to be eliminated before the Final.

Series	Partner	Place	Average Score
20	Hamza Yassin	1st	35.4
21	Jody Cundy	13th	19.0
22	Pete Wicks	5th	27.1
23	Ross King	14th	14.7
24	Lawrence Robb	11th	22.3

Highest and lowest scoring per dance

Dance	Partner	Highest	Partner	Lowest
American Smooth	Hamza Yassin	38	Jody Cundy	20
Argentine Tango	Hamza Yassin	37	Pete Wicks	33
Cha-cha-cha	Hamza Yassin	38	Ross King	10
Charleston	Hamza Yassin	39		
Couple's Choice	Hamza Yassin	40	Pete Wicks	36
Dance-a-thon	Pete Wicks	3		
Foxtrot	Hamza Yassin	34	Pete Wicks	29
Jive	Hamza Yassin	24	Lawrence Robb	19
Paso Doble	Lawrence Robb	20	Jody Cundy	16
Quickstep	Hamza Yassin	35	Jody Cundy	21
Rumba	Hamza Yassin	25	Lawrence Robb	20
Salsa	Hamza Yassin	39	Jody Cundy	19
Samba	Hamza Yassin	36	Pete Wicks	26
Showdance	Hamza Yassin	34		
Tango	Hamza Yassin	33	Lawrence Robb	26
Viennese Waltz	Pete Wicks	31	Lawrence Robb	19
Waltz	Hamza Yassin	37	Ross King	15

Series 20 – with celebrity partner Hamza Yassin

Week	Dance & Song	Judges' Score				Total	Result
Week	Dance & Song	Horwood	Mabuse	Ballas	Du Beke	Total	Result
1	Foxtrot/"Islands in the Stream"	8	9	9	8	34	No Elimination
2	Jive/"Blinding Lights"	4	7	6	7	24	Safe
3	Rumba/"Welcome to Jurassic Park"	5	7	6	7	25	Safe
4	Salsa/"Ecuador"	9	10	10	10	39	Safe
5	Quickstep/"On Top of the World"	8	9	9	9	35	Safe
6	Tango/"Wicked Game"	8	9	8	8	33	Safe
7	Cha-cha-cha/"I Can't Help Myself (Sugar Pie Honey Bunch)"	8	10	10	10	38	Safe
8	Couple's Choice/"Jerusalema"	8	10	10	10	38	Safe
9	American Smooth/"New York, New York"	9	9	10	10	38	Safe
10	Argentine Tango/"Libertango"	8	10	10	9	37	Safe
11	Samba/"They Live in You"	9	9	9	9	36	Safe
12	Charleston/"Pencil Full of Lead"; Waltz/"What the World Needs Now Is Love"	9; 9	10; 10	10; 9	10; 9	39; 37	Safe
13	Salsa/"Ecuador"; Showdance/"Let's Face The Music And Dance"; Couple's Choice / "Jerusalema"	9; 8; 10	10; 9; 10	10; 8; 10	10; 9; 10	39; 34; 40	Winners

- Green number indicates when Hamza & Jowita were at the top of the leaderboard.
- Red number indicates when Hamza & Jowita were at the bottom of the leaderboard.

Series 21 – with celebrity partner Jody Cundy

Week	Dance & Song	Judges' Score				Total	Result
Week	Dance & Song	Horwood	Mabuse	Ballas	Du Beke	Total	Result
1	Quickstep/"I'm Sitting on Top of the World"	5	5	6	5	21	No Elimination
2	Paso Doble/"Thunderstruck"	3	4	4	5	16	Safe
3	American Smooth/"Married Life"	4	5	5	6	20	Safe
4	Salsa/"Samba de Janeiro"	3	5	5	6	19	Eliminated

- Red number indicates when Jody & Jowita were at the bottom of the leaderboard.

Series 22 – with celebrity partner Pete Wicks

Week	Dance & Song	Judges' Score				Total	Result
Week	Dance & Song	Horwood	Mabuse	Ballas	Du Beke	Total	Result
1	Paso Doble/"Breathe"	4	5	3	5	17	No Elimination
2	American Smooth/"I Had Some Help"	4	6	6	6	23	Safe
3	Samba/"George of the Jungle"	6	6	7	7	26	Safe
4	Quickstep/"Town Called Malice"	7	7	8	7	29	Safe
5	Rumba/"Don't Look Back in Anger"	4	5	6	7	22	Safe
6	Viennese waltz/"That's Life"	7	8	8	8	31	Safe
7	Salsa/"Another One Bites the Dust"	4	6	6	6	22	Safe
8	Couple's Choice/"The Best"	8	9	10	9	36	Safe
9	Cha-cha-cha/"I'm Too Sexy"	4	7	8	8	27	Safe
10	Tango/"Easy Lover"; Samba-thon / "Samba (Conga)" & "La Vida Es Un Carnaval"	6 Awarded	7; 3	8 extra	8 points	29; 32	Safe
11	Waltz/"Somewhere"	5	7	7	7	26	Safe
12	Foxtrot/"Beyond the Sea"; Argentine Tango/ "Bitter Sweet Symphony"	7; 7	8; 8	9; 9	8; 9	32; 33	Eliminated

- Red number indicates when Pete & Jowita were at the bottom of the leaderboard.

Series 23 – with celebrity partner Ross King

Week	Dance & Song	Judges' Score				Total	Result
Week	Dance & Song	Horwood	Mabuse	Ballas	Du Beke	Total	Result
1	Cha-cha-cha/"California Gurls"	2	3	2	3	10	No Elimination
2	Waltz/"Sunshine on Leith"	2	4	4	5	15	Safe
3	Paso doble/"Thunderbirds Theme"	4	5	5	5	19	Eliminated

- Red number indicates when Ross & Jowita were at the bottom of the leaderboard.

== Strictly Come Dancing Christmas Special ==
She danced with Adrian Chiles for 2021's Strictly Come Dancing Christmas Special. She danced with Danny Cipriani for the 2023 Strictly Come Dancing Christmas Special.

== Dance tours ==
In October 2025, Przystal announced she was to appear at Dancing With The Stars Weekends (2026).
