= Vito Coppola =

Italian dancer and choreographer (born 1992)

- Born: 27 September 1992 (age 34); Eboli, Salerno, Italy
- Occupations: Dancer; choreographer
- Known for: Ballando con le Stelle; Strictly Come Dancing
- Height: 1.80 m (5 ft 11 in)

Vito Coppola (born 27 September 1992) is an Italian dancer and choreographer. He is best known for appearing as a professional dancer on the 16th series of Italian dance competition Ballando con le Stelle (Dancing with the Stars) in 2021 and ultimately winning the competition with Arisa. Since 2022, he has served as a professional on Strictly Come Dancing, the British version of the show, from the 20th series onwards, winning in 2023 with his celebrity dance partner Ellie Leach. In 2024, Coppola won the 19th series of Celebrity MasterChef.

== Early life and competitive career ==
Coppola was born in Eboli, in Salerno, Italy on 27 September 1992. He has a younger brother, Jonathan. Coppola began dancing at the age of 6 and later competed in national championships. Coppola is a three-time World Championship finalist and a European Cup Winner. He won numerous competitions at provincial, regional and inter-regional level, and went on to win the first Italian championship at the age of 10 in the Juveniles category, as well as being selected by FIDS to represent Italy at the Team Match in Mannheim, Germany. Coppola also won the second Italian championship in the Combined 10 dances, passing with a merit into the higher category.

== Early career and Ballando con le Stelle ==
Prior to his appearances on competitive dance series, Coppola worked as a dancer on the Italian version of The Masked Singer. In 2021, Coppola joined the Rai 1 Italian dance television series Ballando con le Stelle as a professional for the 16th season. He was partnered with the singer and actress Arisa and the pair were crowned winners of the series. Coppola did not return for the following series, his departure alluding to him becoming a professional on the British version.

Series	Partner	Place	Average score
16	Arisa	1st	—N/a

=== Series 16: with Arisa ===
Week no.	Dance/song	Judges' score					Total	Result
Week no.	Dance/song	Zazzaroni	Canino	Smith	Lucarelli	Mariotto	Total	Result
1	Charleston	7	7	7	6	8	85 (Note: Arisa & Vito received 50 bonus points)	No elimination
2	Freestyle Veloce	7	9	10	10	8	54 (Note: Arisa & Vito received 10 bonus points)	Safe
3	Paso doble	7	7	7	10	9	40	Safe
4	Tango	8	9	9	8	8	42	Safe
5	Rumba	9	10	9	9	10	47	Safe
6	Bachata	—N/a	—N/a	—N/a	—N/a	—N/a	—N/a	Safe
7	Freestyle Lento	9	9	10	10	10	73 (Note: Arisa & Vito received 25 bonus points)	Safe
8	Cha-cha-cha	—N/a	—N/a	—N/a	—N/a	—N/a	—N/a	Safe
Safe
10	Waltz	9	9	9	10	10	67 (Note: Arisa & Vito received 20 bonus points)	Winners

== Strictly Come Dancing ==
In July 2022, Coppola was announced to be joining the 20th series of Strictly Come Dancing as one of the professionals. Joining alongside Carlos Gu, Lauren Oakley and Michelle Tsiakkas, he said upon his appointment as a professional on the show, "[He was] really excited to become part of this family, adding that [He could not] wait to start this new adventure and to challenge [himself]. Strictly sto arrivando!". For his first series, he was paired with singer-songwriter and presenter Fleur East. Together they received the first perfect score of the series. Coppola reached the final with East and the couple finished as runners-up behind Hamza Yassin and Jowita Przystał, alongside Helen Skelton and Gorka Márquez, and Molly Rainford and Carlos Gu. Coppola returned for the 21st series. He was paired with former Coronation Street actress Ellie Leach, and the two of them eventually went on to win the series.

In April 2024, Coppola headlined a charity dance show alongside his fellow Strictly Come Dancing professional Luba Mushtuk, with the profits going to Macmillan Cancer Support.

Series	Partner	Place	Average score
20	Fleur East	2nd	35.5
21	Ellie Leach	1st	35.8
22	Sarah Hadland	2nd	35.3
23	Ellie Goldstein	10th	25.5
24	Lacey Turner		28.8

Highest and lowest scoring per dance

Dance	Partner	Highest	Partner	Lowest
American Smooth	Ellie Leach	40	Fleur East Lacey Turner	29
Argentine Tango	Ellie Leach; Fleur East; Sarah Hadland	38		
Cha-cha-cha	Sarah Hadland	40	Ellie Goldstein	17
Charleston	Fleur East Ellie Leach	39	Lacey Turner	36
Couple's Choice	Fleur East	40	Ellie Goldstein	31
Dance-a-thon	Sarah Hadland	4		
Foxtrot	Ellie Leach	31	Sarah Hadland Lacey Turner	27
Jive	Sarah Hadland	36	Ellie Leach	29
Paso Doble	Ellie Leach	39	Sarah Hadland	32
Quickstep	Fleur East	38	Lacey Turner	28
Rumba	Sarah Hadland	36	Lacey Turner	30
Salsa	Ellie Leach	38	Ellie Goldstein	28
Samba	Fleur East	40	Lacey Turner	26
Showdance	Fleur East; Sarah Hadland	39	Ellie Leach	36
Tango	Sarah Hadland	36	Ellie Goldstein	27
Viennese Waltz	Ellie Leach; Sarah Hadland	33	Fleur East	28
Waltz	Fleur East	35	Ellie Goldstein	23

=== Series 20: with Fleur East ===
Week no.	Dance/song	Judges' score				Total	Result
Week no.	Dance/song	Horwood	Mabuse	Ballas	Du Beke	Total	Result
1	Cha-cha-cha / "Let's Get Loud"	7	7	7	8	29	No elimination
2	Viennese waltz / "Glimpse of Us"	7	8	6	7	28	Safe
3	American Smooth / "Part of Your World"	6	8	7	8	29	Bottom two
4	Argentine tango / "Paint It, Black"	9	10	9	10	38	Safe
5	Jive / "Waterloo"	7	8	9	8	32	Safe
6	Salsa / "Break My Soul"	8	8	8	8	32	Bottom two
7	Waltz / "I Guess That's Why They Call It the Blues"	9	9	8	9	35	Safe
8	Samba / "Hot"	9	10	10	10	39	Safe
9	Couple's Choice / "Jumpin', Jumpin'"/"Independent Women Part I"/"Lose My Breath"	10	10	10	10	40	Safe
10	Rumba / "Too Lost In You"	8	9	9	9	35	Bottom two
11	Quickstep / "I Got Rhythm"	9	10	9	10	38	Safe
12	Paso doble / "The Time Is Now"	8	9	8	10	35	Bottom two
12	Charleston / "Tu vuò fà l'americano"	9	10	10	10	39	Bottom two
13	Samba / "Hot"	10	10	10	10	40	Runner-up
13	Showdance / "Find Me"	9	10	10	10	39	Runner-up
13	Couple's Choice / "Jumpin', Jumpin'"/"Independent Women Part I"/"Lose My Breath"	10	10	10	10	40	Runner-up

=== Series 21: with Ellie Leach ===
Week no.	Dance/song	Judges' score				Total	Result
Week no.	Dance/song	Horwood	Mabuse	Ballas	Du Beke	Total	Result
1	Jive / "Can't Tame Her"	7	8	7	7	29	No elimination
2	Foxtrot / "Perfect"	8	8	7	8	31	Safe
3	Viennese waltz / "Waiting on a Miracle"	8	9	8	8	33	Safe
4	Samba / "Copacabana"	7	7	7	7	28	Safe
5	Paso doble / "Insomnia"	9	10	9	9	37	Safe
6	Salsa / "Murder on the Dancefloor"	9	10	10	9	38	Safe
7	American Smooth / "Ain't That a Kick in the Head?"	9	10	10	10	39	Safe
8	Rumba / "True Colors"	8	9	9	9	35	Safe
9	Charleston / "Love Machine"	9	10	10	10	39	Safe
10	Argentine tango / "Bills"	9	10	10	9	38	Safe
11	Quickstep / "Belle"	9	9	9	9	36	No elimination
12	Cha-cha-cha / "Mambo Italiano"; Couple's Choice / "Blow Your Mind" & "Physical"	9; 9	10; 9	9; 10	9; 10	37; 38	Safe
13	Paso doble / "Insomnia"; Showdance / "On the Floor" & "Dance Again"; American Smooth / "Ain't That a Kick in the Head?"	9; 9; 10	10; 9; 10	10; 9; 10	10; 9; 10	39; 36; 40	Winners

=== Series 22: with Sarah Hadland ===
Week no.	Dance/song	Judges' score				Total	Result
Week no.	Dance/song	Horwood	Mabuse	Ballas	Du Beke	Total	Result
1	Quickstep / "9 to 5"	8	8	7	7	30	No elimination
2	Paso Doble / "Freed from Desire"	8	8	8	8	32	Safe
3	Viennese waltz / "Hedwig's Theme"	8	9	8	8	33	Safe
4	Foxtrot / "Birds of a Feather"	6	7	7	7	27	Safe
5	Samba / "Do It, Do It Again"	8	8	8	8	32	Safe
6	Argentine tango / "Ready or Not"	9	10	9	10	38	Safe
7	Cha-cha-cha / "Like a Prayer"	9	9	9	10	37	Safe
8	American Smooth / "Proud"	8	8	8	9	33	Safe
9	Couple's Choice / "Padam Padam"/"Can't Get You Out of My Head"	9	10	10	10	39	Safe
10	Rumba / "Chains"; Samba-thon / "Samba" & "La Vida Es Un Carnaval"	8 Awarded	8; 4	10 extra	10 points	36; 40	Safe
11	Charleston / "Popular"	9	9	10	10	38	Safe
12	Tango / "Big Love"; Jive / "I'm So Excited"	9; 9	9; 9	9; 9	9; 9	36; 36	Safe
13	American Smooth / "Proud"; Showdance / "Cabaret"; Cha-cha-cha / "Like a Prayer"	10; 10; 10	10; 9; 10	10; 10; 10	9; 10; 10	39; 39; 40	Runner-up

=== Series 23: with Ellie Goldstein ===
Week no.	Dance/song	Judges' score				Total	Result
Week no.	Dance/song	Horwood	Mabuse	Ballas	Du Beke	Total	Result
1	Cha-cha-cha / "Yes, And?"	4	4	4	5	17	No elimination
2	Waltz / "Your Song"	5	6	6	6	23	Safe
3	Samba / "Dance the Night"	6	7	7	7	27	Safe
4	Couple's Choice / "Golden"	7	8	8	8	31	Safe
5	Salsa / "Wannabe", "Who Do You Think You Are" & "Spice Up Your Life"	6	8	7	7	28	Safe
6	Tango / "Abracadabra"	6	7	7	7	27	Eliminated

=== Series 24: with Lacey Turner ===
Week no.	Dance/song	Judges' score				Total	Result
Week no.	Dance/song	Horwood	Mabuse	Ballas	Du Beke	Total	Result
1	Cha-cha-cha / "How Will I Know"	7	7	6	7	26	No Elimination
2	Quickstep/I Knew It, I Knew You	6	7	7	8	28	Safe
3	Samba/Bamboléo						

=== Strictly Come Dancing Christmas Special ===
Coppola danced with Scarlett Moffatt for the 2025 Strictly Come Dancing Christmas Special which they won.

== Personal life ==
Coppola is multi-lingual and is fluent in English, Russian and Spanish, as well as his native language Italian.
