= Angela Scanlon =

Irish television presenter

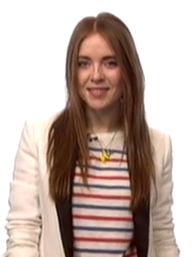
- Scanlon in 2011
- Born: Angela Marie Scanlon; 29 December 1982 (age 43); Ratoath, County Meath, Ireland
- Education: Technological University Dublin
- Occupations: Television presenter; journalist
- Employers: RTÉ; BBC
- Television: Oi Ginger!; The One Show; Robot Wars; Strictly Come Dancing
- Spouse: Roy Horgan (m. 2014)
- Children: 2
- Scanlon's voice Scanlon presenting for RTÉ in 2011

Angela Marie Scanlon (born 29 December 1982) is an Irish television and radio presenter. She initially broadcast on Irish television, presenting a number of programmes on RTÉ including the documentary Oi Ginger! in 2014.

On British television, Scanlon has appeared as a reporter on the BBC magazine programme The One Show since 2016, and presented in the absence of Alex Jones. She was a co-host of Robot Wars with Dara Ó Briain (2016–2018). In 2023 she was a contestant on the twenty-first series of Strictly Come Dancing, partnered with professional dancer Carlos Gu and finishing in sixth place. In 2026, she commentated for the UK at Eurovision during the semi-finals, alongside Rylan. Starting on 16 November 2026, Scanlon became the new presenter of the BBC Radio 2 Drivetime show.

== Early life ==
Angela Marie Scanlon was born on 29 December 1982 in Ratoath, County Meath, Ireland. Her father Phalim, is from County Mayo and worked in construction and her mother Marian, from Galway worked in administration. She has three sisters. Scanlon attended mixed-sex, primary and secondary schools and went on to study business at Technological University Dublin (TU Dublin). After graduating, she travelled for a period, including six months in New York (where she worked in an Irish pub), in Australia, and South East Asia. Scanlon planned to set up a fashion shop upon returning to Ireland. She has admitted to suffering from eating disorders for a period of 15 years, for which she underwent therapy.

== Career ==
Scanlon has worked as a stylist and a journalist, before moving into television. She wrote for Tatler, Grazia, Company, U Magazine, and Sunday Times Style magazine. She also wrote the column "Out of the Closet" for the Irish Independent's Weekend magazine.

In 2012, The Irish Times described Scanlon as one of "10 Irish Instagrammers You Need to Follow". Scanlon was named as "one to watch" by Vogue in 2013, and was cited in The Observer's regular Why We're Watching feature as the UK's new onscreen fashion queen. The Daily Telegraph also commended Scanlon's talents in Who's That Girl. In 2013, she fronted a campaign for Louis Vuitton.

After working on fashion shows Xposé and Off the Rails for RTÉ and on Channel 4's Sunday Brunch, Scanlon went on to join RTÉ's The Movie Show as a reporter, and on The Love Clinic in 2012. In 2013 and 2014, she appeared on The Saturday Night Show with host Brendan O'Connor.

Scanlon joined the panel of RTÉ's Next Week's News in February 2014. She also put together a Yahoo! 12-part series Work the Look demonstrating how to pull off key essential looks.

Her first major documentary Oi Ginger! was broadcast in 2014. Angela Scanlon: Full Frontal was her follow-up series airing in October 2014, addressing subjects sometimes considered taboo. Scanlon was featured on Republic of Telly's Ginger is the New Black in October 2014.

In 2014, she hosted London Fashion Weekend for a third time, a job she took over from Caroline Flack after hosting the Vodafone Live Lounge for the British Fashion Council at the event for two years. Scanlon co-hosts BBC Northern Ireland/RTÉ's popular holiday programme, Getaways, having taken over from Aoibhinn Ní Shúilleabháin. Scanlon also launched Marks & Spencer's pop-up Halloween shop with Joanna Lumley in aid of Oxfam. In 2016, she presented Angela Scanlon's Close Encounters!, and the documentary, Trump's Unlikely Superfans, for BBC Three. Scanlon, along with Michelle Ackerley, provided maternity cover for Alex Jones and co-presented The One Show with Matt Baker in early 2017.

From 2018 to 2021, Scanlon hosted her own BBC Radio 2 show on Sunday mornings from 4 to 6am. Her final show aired on 25 April 2021.

In 2019, Scanlon started presenting for BBC Two Your Home Made Perfect, a home renovation series. In 2022, Scanlon appeared on BBC1's The Wheel as a guest expert on redheads.

In 2023, Scanlon competed on the twenty-first series of Strictly Come Dancing and was partnered with professional dancer Carlos Gu. In week 10 she finished in sixth place after performing the Cha-cha-cha to Gloria Gaynor's "I Will Survive". The judges verdicts after the dance off saved Layton Williams to dance again in the quarter-finals. Head judge Shirley Ballas was alone in voting for Scanlon to remain in the dance competition. Scanlon said she was "really gutted" to leave the competition.

Also in 2023, Scanlon fronted an advertising campaign for Irish postal services provider An Post.

In April 2024 Scanlon began presenting the 7–10 am shows on Saturdays and Sundays on Virgin Radio UK following the resignation of Graham Norton.

In June 2026, Scanlon returned to BBC Radio 2 to cover its drivetime show. On 28 September 2026, it was announced that she would be the new presenter of the teatime show, replacing Sara Cox who went on to present Radio 2's breakfast show.

== Personal life ==
Scanlon met her future husband Roy Horgan in 2010, through friends, while both were in Dublin. She has been married to Horgan since 2014; they have two daughters. The family reside in north London.

== Filmography ==
Year	Title	Role	Channel
2000	Off the Rails		
2008–2010	Xposé	Stylist	
	Next Week's News	Panellist	
2012	The Love Clinic	Reporter	
2012–2013	The Movie Show	Reporter	RTÉ One/RTÉ2
2014	Oi Ginger!	Presenter	
2014	Angela Scanlon: Full Frontal	Presenter	RTÉ2
2015	The Voice UK	Online presenter	BBC Online
2015	T in the Park	Co-presenter	BBC Three
2015–2016	Getaways	Co-presenter	BBC Northern Ireland/RTÉ
2015–present	The One Show	Reporter and stand-in presenter	BBC One
2016	Angela Scanlon's Close Encounters	Presenter	
2016	The British Academy Film Awards: Red Carpet	Presenter	
2016	Trump's Unlikely Superfans	Presenter	
2016—2018	Robot Wars	Co-presenter	BBC Two
2017	Tourettes: Teenage Tics	Narrator	BBC Three
2017	Delete, Delete, Delete	Guest	BBC One Northern Ireland
2017	Debatable	Panellist	BBC Two; 3 episodes
2017	Britain's Greatest Invention	Contributor	BBC Two
2017	World's Oldest Family	Presenter	BBC One
2017	Richard Osman's House of Games	Contestant	BBC Two; 5 episodes
2018–present	Bake off: Extra Slice	Panelist	Channel 4
2019–present	Your Home Made Perfect	Presenter	BBC Two
2020–present	The Noughties	Presenter	BBC Two
2021	Alan Davies As Yet Untitled	Guest	Dave
2021–present	Your Garden Made Perfect	Presenter	BBC Two
2021–present	Ask Me Anything	Presenter	RTÉ One
2023	Strictly Come Dancing	Contestant	BBC One
2025	The Celebrity Apprentice: Christmas Specials	Herself / Contestant	BBC One
2026–present	The Apprentice: Unfinished Business	Host	BBC Two
