= Strictly Come Dancing series 20 =

Strictly Come Dancing
- Series 20
- Presented by: Tess Daly; Claudia Winkleman
- Judges: Shirley Ballas; Anton Du Beke; Motsi Mabuse; Craig Revel Horwood
- Celebrity winner: Hamza Yassin
- Professional winner: Jowita Przystał
- No. of episodes: 25

Release
- Original network: BBC One
- Original release: 23 September – 17 December 2022

Series chronology
- ← Previous; Series 19 Next → Series 21

Strictly Come Dancing returned for its twentieth series with a launch show on 23 September 2022 on BBC One, with live shows beginning the following day on 24 September. The launch show was originally scheduled to be broadcast on 17 September, but was postponed following the death of Queen Elizabeth II. Tess Daly and Claudia Winkleman returned as hosts, while Rylan Clark and Janette Manrara returned to host Strictly Come Dancing: It Takes Two.

In May 2022, the BBC announced that Shirley Ballas, Anton Du Beke, Motsi Mabuse, and Craig Revel Horwood would return to the judging panel. It was also confirmed that Bruno Tonioli, who had been absent from the two previous series due to travel restrictions resulting from the COVID-19 pandemic, would be permanently leaving the show.

In August 2022, the BBC confirmed that the show would return to the Blackpool Tower Ballroom for the first time since the seventeenth series. It was also announced that there would be a special themed week to celebrate the 100th anniversary of the BBC, with the couples dancing to "a theme tune from an iconic BBC programme or in tribute to one of the BBC's most loved services".

Wildlife presenter Hamza Yassin and Jowita Przystał were announced as the winners on 17 December, while singer-songwriter Fleur East and Vito Coppola, Nova Jones actress Molly Rainford and Carlos Gu, and television presenter Helen Skelton and Gorka Márquez were the runners-up.

== Format ==
Hosts and Judges for Strictly Come Dancing Series 20

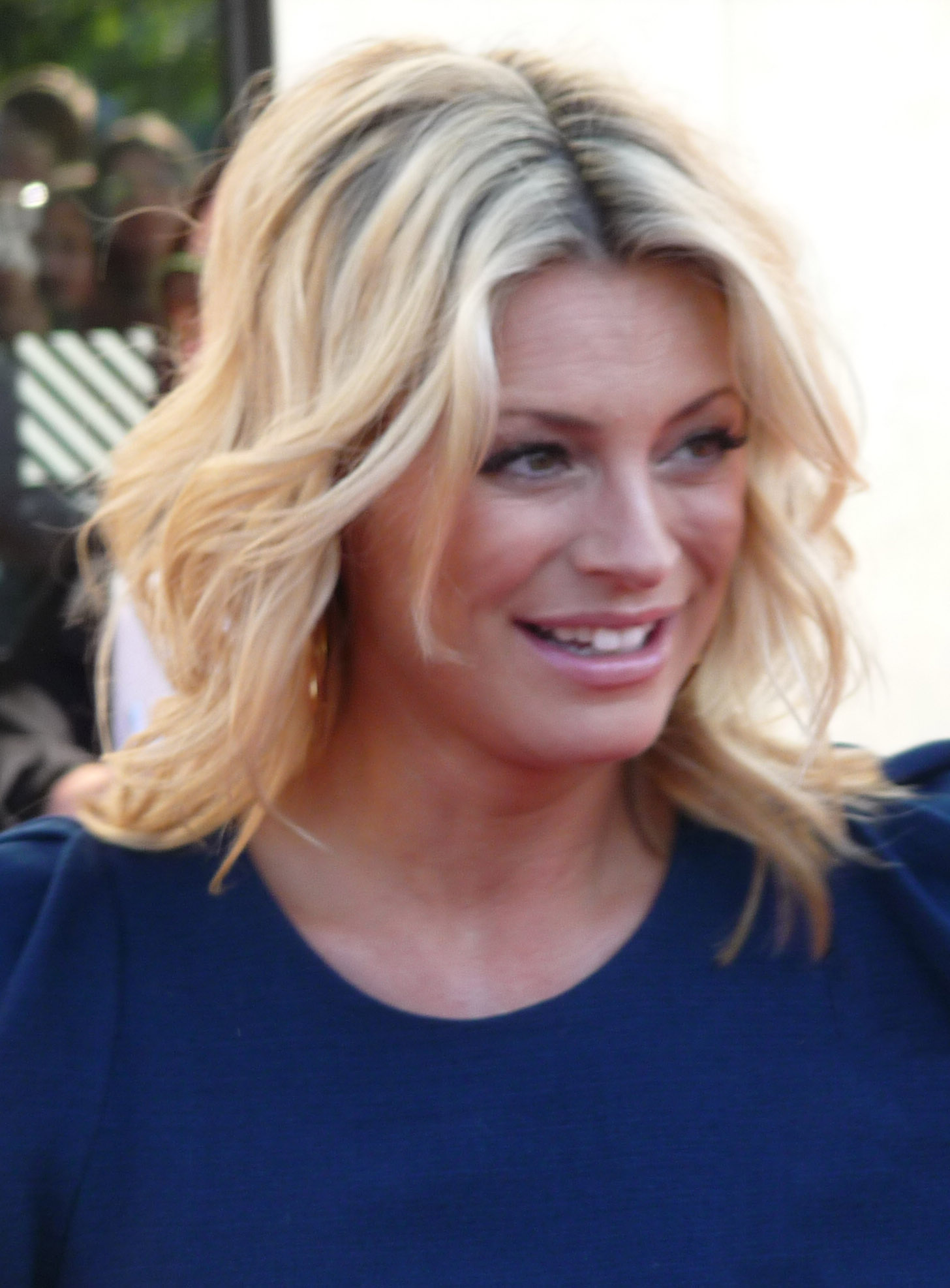
Tess Daly

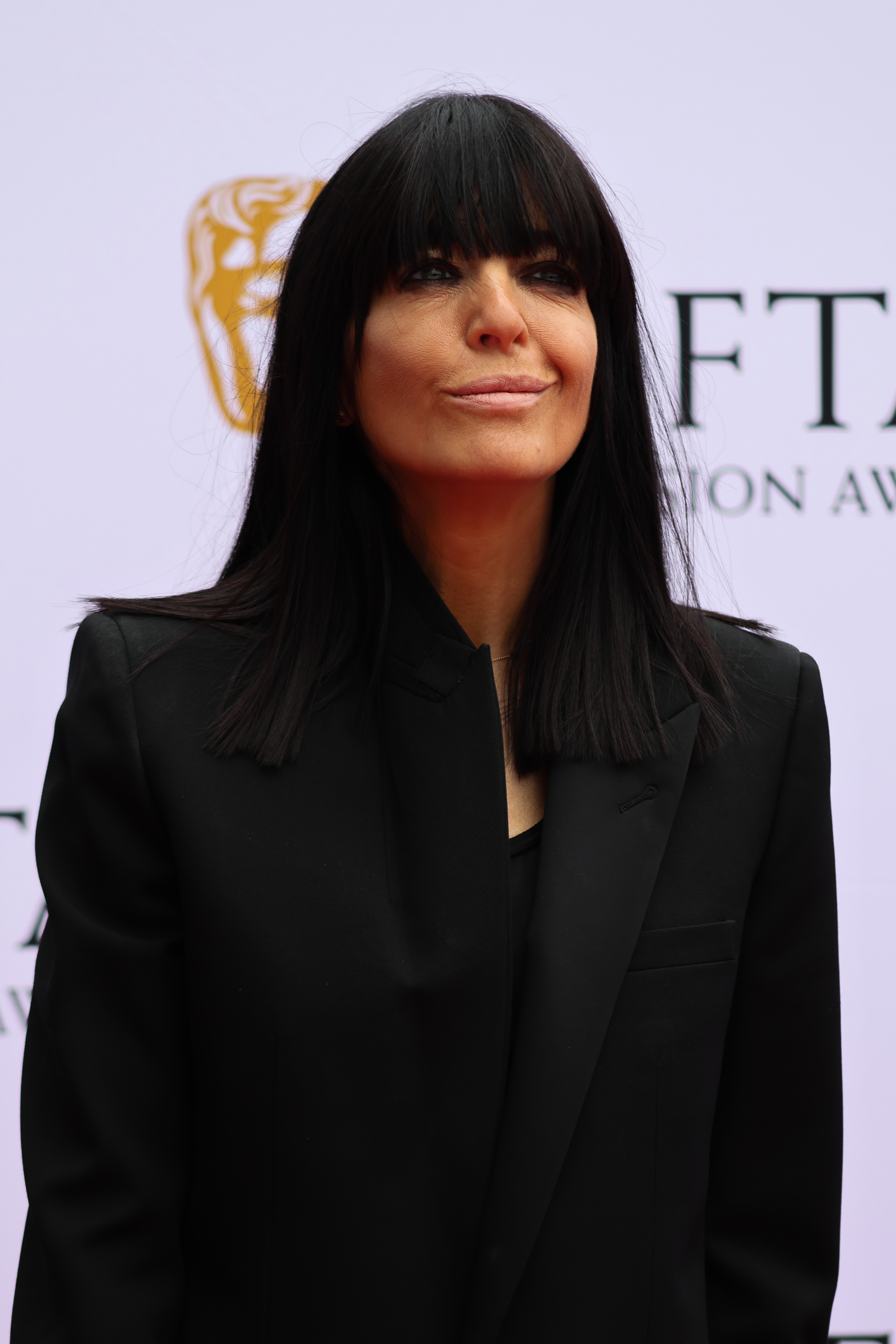
Claudia Winkleman

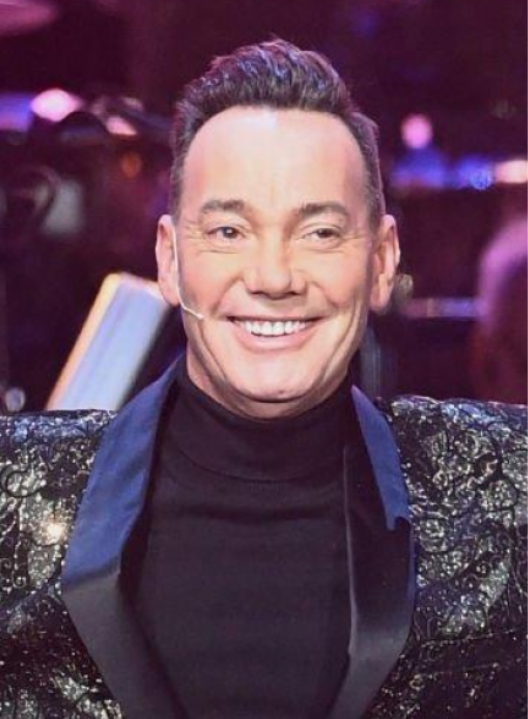
Craig Revel Horwood

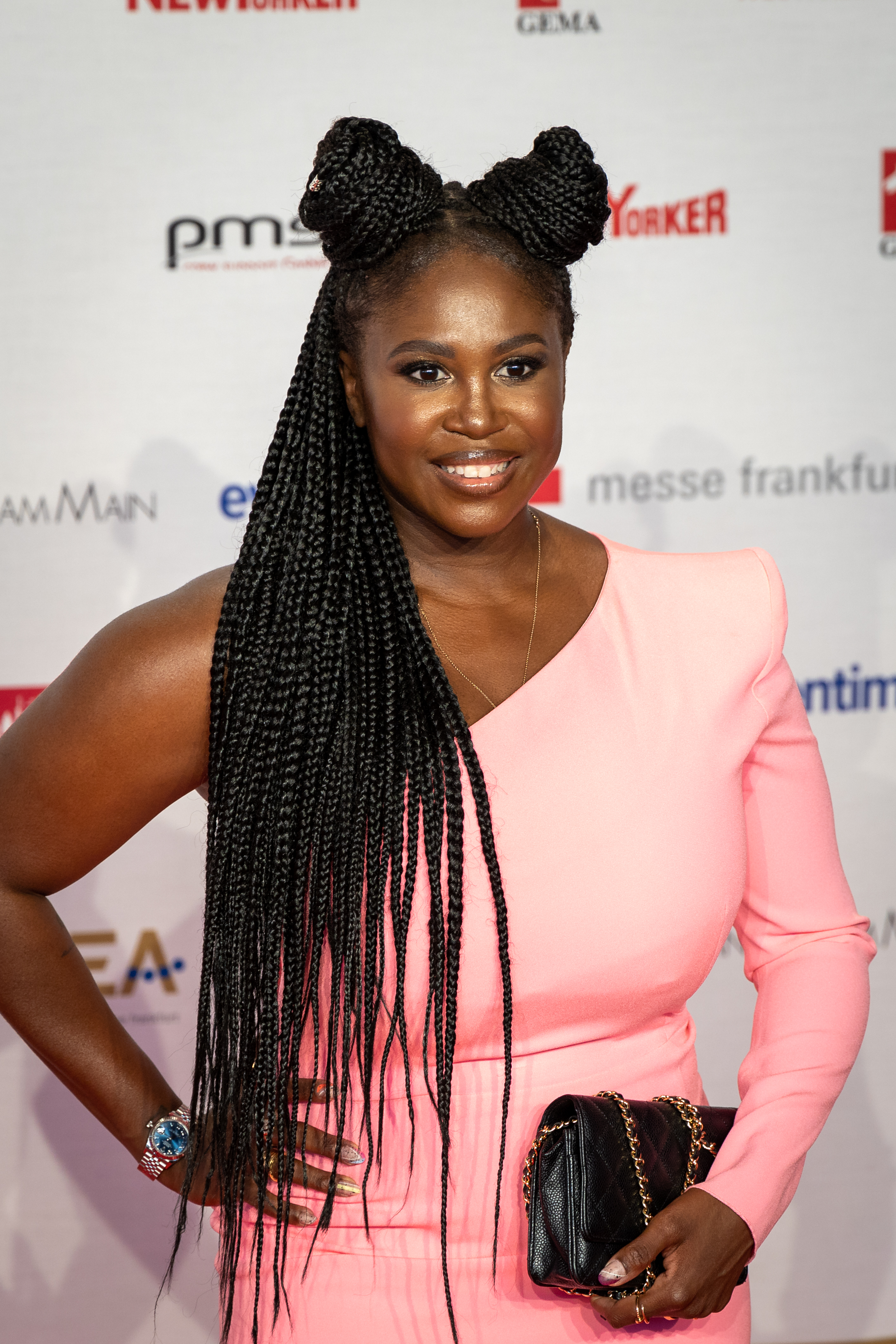
Motsi Mabuse

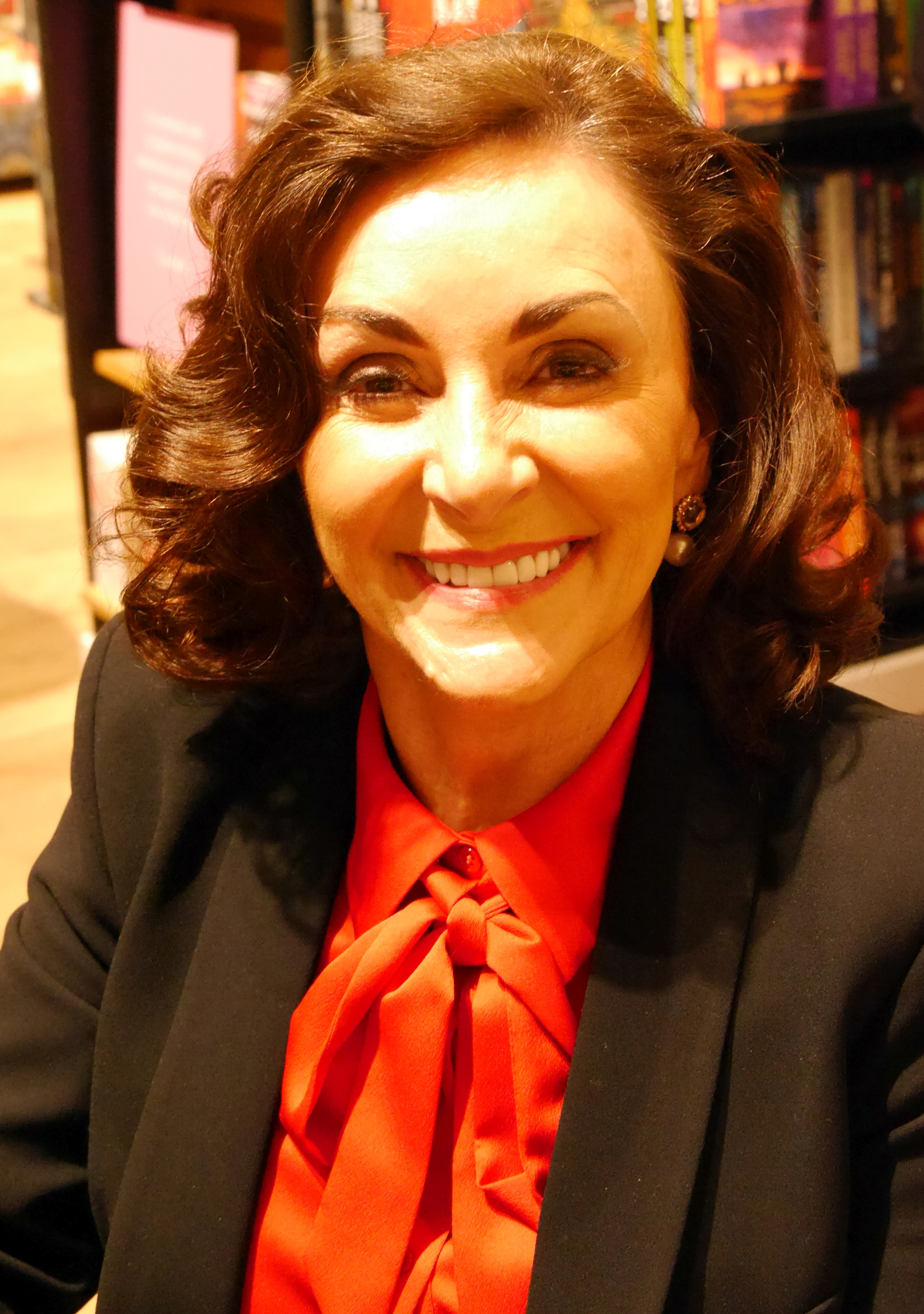
Shirley Ballas

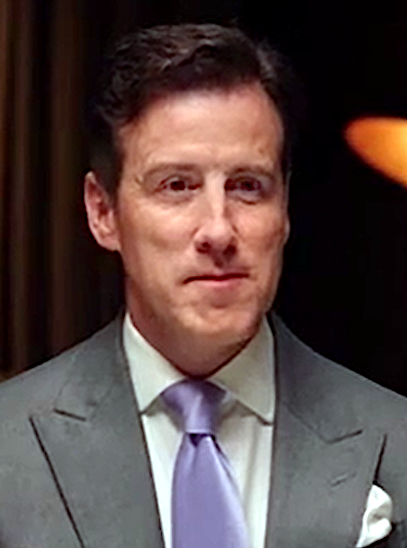
Anton Du Beke

The couples dance each week in a live show. The judges score each performance out of ten. The couples are then ranked according to the judges' scores and given points according to their rank, with the lowest scored couple receiving one point, and the highest scored couple receiving the most points (the maximum number of points available depends on the number of couples remaining in the competition). The public are also invited to vote for their favourite couples, and the couples are ranked again according to the number of votes they receive, again receiving points; the couple with the fewest votes receiving one point, and the couple with the most votes receiving the most points.

The points for judges' score and public vote are then added together, and the two couples with the fewest points are placed in the bottom two. If two couples have equal points, the points from the public vote are given precedence. As with the previous series, the bottom two couples have to perform a dance-off on the results show. Based on that performance alone, each judge then votes on which couple should stay and which couple should leave, with Shirley Ballas, as head judge, having the last and deciding vote.

== Professional dancers ==
On 22 February 2022, it was announced that Oti Mabuse was leaving the series after seven years, and on 28 March 2022, that Aljaž Škorjanec was also leaving after nine years (He returned to the show in 2024). Three days after Škorjanec's departure, the BBC announced that the rest of the current professionals would be returning to the series.

In July 2022, the BBC announced that four new professional dancers would be joining the cast: European cup winner Vito Coppola, who was also a professional dancer on the Italian version of the show in 2021; Chinese National Champion Carlos Gu; former Under 21 British National Champion Lauren Oakley; and Latin dance champion Michelle Tsiakkas. Jowita Przystał received a celebrity partner for the first time, as did new professionals Vito Coppola and Carlos Gu; while Neil Jones, Cameron Lombard, Luba Mushtuk, Lauren Oakley, and Michelle Tsiakkas did not receive a partner.

== Couples ==
This series featured fifteen celebrity contestants. On 4 August 2022, the first two celebrities announced were Will Mellor and Kym Marsh. Celebrity contestants continued to be revealed until 13 August 2022, when the full line-up was announced. During the results show on 13 November, after initially being announced as one of the bottom two couples, Tony Adams and Katya Jones withdrew from the competition due to Adams having sustained a hamstring injury during their original performance.

Celebrity	Notability	Professional partner	Status
Kaye Adams	Loose Women panellist & journalist	Kai Widdrington	Eliminated 1st on 2 October 2022
Richie Anderson	Television & radio presenter	Giovanni Pernice	Eliminated 2nd on 9 October 2022
Matt Goss	Singer-songwriter	Nadiya Bychkova	Eliminated 3rd on 16 October 2022
Jayde Adams	Comedian & actress	Karen Hauer	Eliminated 4th on 23 October 2022
James Bye	EastEnders actor	Amy Dowden	Eliminated 5th on 30 October 2022
Ellie Simmonds	Paralympic swimmer	Nikita Kuzmin	Eliminated 6th on 6 November 2022
Tony Adams	England footballer & manager	Katya Jones	Withdrew on 13 November 2022
Tyler West	Kiss FM presenter	Dianne Buswell	Eliminated 7th on 20 November 2022
Ellie Taylor	Comedian, actress & television presenter	Johannes Radebe	Eliminated 8th on 27 November 2022
Kym Marsh	Actress, singer & Morning Live presenter	Graziano Di Prima	Eliminated 9th on 4 December 2022
Will Mellor	Stage & screen actor	Nancy Xu	Eliminated 10th on 11 December 2022
Fleur East	Singer-songwriter & radio presenter	Vito Coppola	Runners-up on 17 December 2022
Helen Skelton	Television presenter	Gorka Márquez	Runners-up on 17 December 2022
Molly Rainford	Nova Jones actress & singer	Carlos Gu	Runners-up on 17 December 2022
Hamza Yassin	Wildlife cameraman & television presenter	Jowita Przystał	Winners on 17 December 2022

== Scoring chart ==
The highest score each week is indicated in bold green with a dagger (†), while the lowest score each week is indicated in italicized red with a double-dagger (‡).

Color key:

Winners
Runners-up
Bottom two
Excused from competition for the week
Withdrew from competition
Eliminated

Strictly Come Dancing (series 20) – Weekly scores
Couple	Pl.	Week													
Couple	Pl.	1	2	1+2	3	4	5	6	7	8	9	10	11	12	13
Hamza & Jowita	1st	**34**†	24	58	25	**39**†	**35**†	33	**38**†	38	38	37	36	39+37=**76**†	39+34+40=113‡ (Note: This couple finished in first place.)
Fleur & Vito	2nd	29	28	57	29 (Note: This couple was in the bottom two, but was not eliminated.)	38	32	32	35	**39**†	**40**†	35	38	35+39=74	40+39+40=**119**† (Note: This couple finished in second place.)
Helen & Gorka	2nd	26	27	53	31	29	**35**†	32	37	32	39	29	**39**†	35+37=72	39+37+40=116
Molly & Carlos	2nd	31	**34**†	**65**†	34	35	30	33	35	37	35	35	38	36+39=75	39+37+39=115
Will & Nancy	5th	**34**†	26	60	33	23	32	32	33	38	35	**38**†	**39**†	32+38=70‡ (Note: This couple was eliminated.)	
Kym & Graziano	6th	23	27	50	33	32	27	34	37	31	33	(Note: This couple was excused from competition due to illness or injury, and was granted a bye to the following week.)	34‡		
Ellie T. & Johannes	7th	28	23	51	21	30	29	**35**†	22	31	31‡	25‡			
Tyler & Dianne	8th	22	31	53	**38**†	37	32	**35**†	29	31	35				
Tony & Katya	9th	15‡	22‡	37‡	18‡	26	19‡	31	21‡	24‡ (Note: This couple withdrew from the competition.)					
Ellie S. & Nikita	10th	26	30	56	27	30	30	29	33						
James & Amy	11th	22	24	46	22	32	26	27‡							
Jayde & Karen	12th	23	26	49	29	31	28								
Matt & Nadiya	13th	20	22‡	42	21	20‡									
Richie & Giovanni	14th	23	32	55	27										
Kaye & Kai	15th	21	22‡	43											

=== Average chart ===
This table only counts for dances scored on a traditional 40-point scale.

Couple	Rank by average	Total points	Number of dances	Total average
Fleur & Vito	1st	568	16	35.5
Molly & Carlos	2nd	567	16	35.4
Hamza & Jowita	2nd	566	16	35.4
Helen & Gorka	4th	544	16	34.0
Will & Nancy	5th	433	13	33.3
Tyler & Dianne	6th	290	9	32.2
Kym & Graziano	7th	311	10	31.1
Ellie S. & Nikita	8th	205	7	29.3
Ellie T. & Johannes	9th	275	10	27.5
Jayde & Karen	10th	137	5	27.4
Richie & Giovanni	11th	82	3	27.3
James & Amy	12th	153	6	25.5
Tony & Katya	13th	176	8	22.0
Kaye & Kai	14th	43	2	21.5
Matt & Nadiya	15th	83	4	20.8

== Weekly scores ==
Unless indicated otherwise, individual judges scores in the charts below (given in parentheses) are listed in this order from left to right: Craig Revel Horwood, Motsi Mabuse, Shirley Ballas, Anton Du Beke.

=== Week 1 ===
There was no elimination this week; all scores carried over to the following week. Couples are listed in the order they performed.

Couple	Scores	Dance	Music
Kym & Graziano	23 (4, 6, 6, 7)	Jive	"Yes" — Merry Clayton
Tyler & Dianne	22 (4, 5, 7, 6)	American Smooth	"Falling" — Harry Styles
Jayde & Karen	23 (4, 7, 6, 6)	Samba	"Dirrty" — Christina Aguilera, feat. Redman
Kaye & Kai	21 (6, 5, 5, 5)	Tango	"Voulez-Vous" — ABBA
James & Amy	22 (6, 5, 5, 6)	Jive	"What I Like About You" — The Romantics
Richie & Giovanni	23 (5, 5, 6, 7)	Cha-cha-cha	"I'm Your Man" — Wham!
Helen & Gorka	26 (6, 7, 6, 7)	American Smooth	"You Send Me" — Aretha Franklin
Molly & Carlos	31 (7, 8, 8, 8)	Samba	"Kiss My (Uh-Oh)" — Anne-Marie & Little Mix
Matt & Nadiya	20 (5, 5, 5, 5)	Quickstep	"Sir Duke" — Stevie Wonder
Ellie S. & Nikita	26 (6, 7, 7, 6)	Cha-cha-cha	"Dance" — DNCE
Tony & Katya	15 (3, 4, 4, 4)	Tango	"Go West" — Village People
Will & Nancy	34 (8, 9, 8, 9)	Jive	"Livin' la Vida Loca" — Ricky Martin
Ellie T. & Johannes	28 (6, 7, 7, 8)	Quickstep	"I Am What I Am" — Klaus Hallen Tanzorchester
Hamza & Jowita	34 (8, 9, 9, 8)	Foxtrot	"Islands in the Stream" — Kenny Rogers & Dolly Parton
Fleur & Vito	29 (7, 7, 7, 8)	Cha-cha-cha	"Let's Get Loud" — Jennifer Lopez

=== Week 2 ===
Musical guest: Robbie Williams — "She's the One"

Couples are listed in the order they performed.

Couple	Scores	Dance	Music	Result
Will & Nancy	26 (6, 7, 6, 7)	Salsa	"Never Too Much" — Luther Vandross	Safe
James & Amy	24 (5, 6, 6, 7)	Tango	"Bad Habits" — Ed Sheeran	Safe
Ellie S. & Nikita	30 (7, 8, 7, 8)	Waltz	"Can't Help Falling in Love" — Elvis Presley	Safe
Helen & Gorka	27 (5, 7, 7, 8)	Cha-cha-cha	"Rain on Me" — Lady Gaga & Ariana Grande	Safe
Tony & Katya	22 (4, 6, 6, 6)	Charleston	"My Old Man's a Dustman" — Foster and Allen	Safe
Ellie T. & Johannes	23 (4, 7, 5, 7)	Paso doble	"Les Toréadors" — Georges Bizet	Safe
Richie & Giovanni	32 (8, 8, 8, 8)	Quickstep	"Dancin' Fool" — Barry Manilow	Safe
Fleur & Vito	28 (7, 8, 6, 7)	Viennese waltz	"Glimpse of Us" — Joji	Safe
Kaye & Kai	22 (4, 6, 6, 6)	Charleston	"Music! Music! Music!" — Dorothy Provine	Eliminated
Hamza & Jowita	24 (4, 7, 6, 7)	Jive	"Blinding Lights" — the Weeknd	Safe
Kym & Graziano	27 (6, 7, 7, 7)	Viennese waltz	"Runaway" — The Corrs	Safe
Matt & Nadiya	22 (4, 6, 6, 6)	Samba	"Night Fever" — Bee Gees	Bottom two
Tyler & Dianne	31 (7, 8, 8, 8)	Jive	"Hit the Road Jack" — Ray Charles	Safe
Jayde & Karen	26 (6, 7, 6, 7)	Tango	"Rumour Has It" — Adele	Safe
Molly & Carlos	34 (8, 9, 9, 8)	Quickstep	"Love On Top" — Beyoncé	Safe

Judges' votes to save

- Horwood: Matt & Nadiya
- Mabuse: Matt & Nadiya
- Du Beke: Matt & Nadiya
- Ballas: Did not vote, but would have voted to save Kaye & Kai

=== Week 3: Movie Week ===
Musical guest: Adam Lambert — "Mad About the Boy"

Couples are listed in the order they performed.

Couple	Scores	Dance	Music	Film	Result
Richie & Giovanni	27 (5, 7, 8, 7)	Samba	"Hakuna Matata"	The Lion King	Eliminated
Molly & Carlos	34 (8, 9, 9, 8)	Waltz	"One Hand, One Heart"	West Side Story	Safe
Kym & Graziano	33 (7, 9, 8, 9)	Charleston	"If My Friends Could See Me Now"	Sweet Charity	Safe
Hamza & Jowita	25 (5, 7, 6, 7)	Rumba	"Welcome to Jurassic Park"	Jurassic Park	Safe
Ellie T. & Johannes	21 (4, 6, 5, 6)	Cha-cha-cha	"The Shoop Shoop Song (It's in His Kiss)"	Mermaids	Safe
Matt & Nadiya	21 (3, 6, 5, 7)	Viennese waltz	"Hold My Hand"	Top Gun: Maverick	Safe
Tyler & Dianne	38 (9, 10, 10, 9)	Charleston	"Flash, Bang, Wallop"	Half a Sixpence	Safe
Fleur & Vito	29 (6, 8, 7, 8)	American Smooth	"Part of Your World"	The Little Mermaid	Bottom two
James & Amy	22 (4, 6, 6, 6)	Cha-cha-cha	"Hooked on a Feeling"	Guardians of the Galaxy	Safe
Ellie S. & Nikita	27 (6, 7, 7, 7)	Quickstep	"Peppy and George"	The Artist	Safe
Will & Nancy	33 (8, 9, 8, 8)	American Smooth	"Cry to Me"	Dirty Dancing	Safe
Tony & Katya	18 (2, 6, 4, 6)	Samba	"You Sexy Thing"	The Full Monty	Safe
Helen & Gorka	31 (7, 8, 8, 8)	Viennese waltz	"Hopelessly Devoted to You"	Grease	Safe
Jayde & Karen	29 (7, 8, 7, 7)	Cha-cha-cha	"Flashdance... What a Feeling"	Flashdance	Safe

Judges' votes to save

- Horwood: Fleur & Vito
- Mabuse: Fleur & Vito
- Du Beke: Fleur & Vito
- Ballas: Did not vote, but would have voted to save Richie & Giovanni

=== Week 4 ===
Musical guest: George Ezra — "Dance All Over Me"

Couples are listed in the order they performed.

Couple	Scores	Dance	Music	Result
Ellie S. & Nikita	30 (7, 8, 7, 8)	Salsa	"I Love Your Smile" — Shanice	Safe
Will & Nancy	23 (4, 7, 5, 7)	Rumba	"The Joker and the Queen" — Ed Sheeran, feat. Taylor Swift	Safe
Matt & Nadiya	20 (3, 6, 5, 6)	Jive	"All Shook Up" — Paul McCartney	Eliminated
Jayde & Karen	31 (7, 8, 8, 8)	American Smooth	"Wind Beneath My Wings" — Bette Midler	Safe
Molly & Carlos	35 (8, 9, 9, 9)	Cha-cha-cha	"Do What I Do" — Lady Bri	Safe
James & Amy	32 (8, 8, 8, 8)	Quickstep	"Don't Get Me Wrong" — The Pretenders	Safe
Fleur & Vito	38 (9, 10, 9, 10)	Argentine tango	"Paint It, Black" — Ciara	Safe
Kym & Graziano	32 (7, 8, 8, 9)	Samba	"Volare" — Gipsy Kings	Bottom two
Tony & Katya	26 (5, 7, 7, 7)	American Smooth	"With a Little Help from My Friends" — Joe Cocker	Safe
Hamza & Jowita	39 (9, 10, 10, 10)	Salsa	"Ecuador" — Sash!, feat. Rodriguez	Safe
Helen & Gorka	29 (6, 8, 7, 8)	Paso doble	"Tamacun" — Rodrigo y Gabriela	Safe
Ellie T. & Johannes	30 (7, 8, 7, 8)	Viennese waltz	"Boom Bang-a-Bang" — Lulu	Safe
Tyler & Dianne	37 (8, 9, 10, 10)	Couple's choice	"A Little Bit of Luck" — DJ Luck & MC Neat, "21 Seconds" — So Solid Crew, "Flowers" — Sweet Female Attitude & "Re-Rewind (The Crowd Say Bo Selecta)" — Artful Dodger, feat. Craig David	Safe

Judges' votes to save

- Horwood: Kym & Graziano
- Mabuse: Kym & Graziano
- Du Beke: Kym & Graziano
- Ballas: Did not vote, but would have voted to save Kym & Graziano

=== Week 5: Celebrating BBC 100 Week ===
Musical guest: Becky Hill — "Crazy What Love Can Do", "My Heart Goes (La Di Da)" & "Remember"

Couples are listed in the order they performed.

Couple	Scores	Dance	Music	Celebrating BBC	Result
Helen & Gorka	35 (8, 9, 9, 9)	Charleston	"Barnacle Bill" — Herbert Ashworth-Hope	Blue Peter	Safe
Tyler & Dianne	32 (8, 8, 8, 8)	Tango	"Doctor Who Theme" — Segun Akinola	Doctor Who	Safe
Fleur & Vito	32 (7, 8, 9, 8)	Jive	"Waterloo" — ABBA	Eurovision Song Contest	Safe
James & Amy	26 (6, 7, 6, 7)	Foxtrot	"Julia's Theme" — Simon May	EastEnders	Safe
Ellie S. & Nikita	30 (6, 8, 8, 8)	Paso doble	"Montagues and Capulets" — Sergei Prokofiev	The Apprentice	Safe
Molly & Carlos	30 (6, 8, 8, 8)	Couple's choice	"Chicken Man" — Alan Hawkshaw	Grange Hill	Bottom two
Hamza & Jowita	35 (8, 9, 9, 9)	Quickstep	"On Top of the World" — Imagine Dragons	BBC Nature	Safe
Ellie T. & Johannes	29 (7, 7, 7, 8)	Tango	"Casualty Theme" — Ken Freeman	Casualty	Safe
Jayde & Karen	28 (6, 7, 7, 8)	Charleston	"The Ballad of Barry & Freda (Let's Do It)" — Victoria Wood	BBC Comedy	Eliminated
Will & Nancy	32 (8, 8, 8, 8)	Viennese waltz	"Line of Duty End Title Theme" — Carly Paradis	Line of Duty	Safe
Tony & Katya	19 (3, 6, 4, 6)	Cha-cha-cha	"Grandstand Theme" — Keith Mansfield	Grandstand	Safe
Kym & Graziano	27 (7, 7, 6, 7)	Quickstep	"Ballroom Blitz" — Sweet	Come Dancing	Safe

Judges' votes to save

- Horwood: Molly & Carlos
- Mabuse: Molly & Carlos
- Du Beke: Molly & Carlos
- Ballas: Did not vote, but would have voted to save Molly & Carlos

=== Week 6: Halloween Week ===
Musical guest: Rina Sawayama — "This Hell"

Couples are listed in the order they performed.

Couple	Scores	Dance	Music	Result
Tony & Katya	31 (7, 8, 8, 8)	Quickstep	"The Devil Went Down to Georgia" — Charlie Daniels Band	Safe
Will & Nancy	32 (8, 8, 8, 8)	Cha-cha-cha	"Mama Told Me Not to Come" — Tom Jones & Stereophonics	Safe
Kym & Graziano	34 (8, 8, 9, 9)	Rumba	"Frozen" — Madonna	Safe
James & Amy	27 (6, 7, 7, 7)	Charleston	"Bumble Bee" — LaVern Baker	Eliminated
Molly & Carlos	33 (6, 9, 9, 9)	Argentine tango	"Running Up That Hill" — Kate Bush	Safe
Tyler & Dianne	35 (7, 9, 9, 10)	Cha-cha-cha	"Day-O (The Banana Boat Song)" — Klaus Hallen Tanzorchester	Safe
Helen & Gorka	32 (7, 8, 8, 9)	Foxtrot	"Li'l Red Riding Hood" — Sam the Sham & The Pharaohs	Safe
Hamza & Jowita	33 (8, 9, 8, 8)	Tango	"Wicked Game" — Chris Isaak	Safe
Fleur & Vito	32 (8, 8, 8, 8)	Salsa	"Break My Soul" — Beyoncé	Bottom two
Ellie S. & Nikita	29 (6, 8, 7, 8)	Foxtrot	"Scooby-Doo, Where Are You!" — Larry Markes	Safe
Ellie T. & Johannes	35 (8, 9, 9, 9)	Couple's choice	"I Put a Spell on You" — from Hocus Pocus	Safe

Judges' votes to save

- Horwood: Fleur & Vito
- Mabuse: Fleur & Vito
- Du Beke: Fleur & Vito
- Ballas: Did not vote, but would have voted to save Fleur & Vito

=== Week 7 ===
Musical guest: Luke Evans — "Bridge over Troubled Water"

Couples are listed in the order they performed.

Couple	Scores	Dance	Music	Result
Hamza & Jowita	38 (8, 10, 10, 10)	Cha-cha-cha	"I Can't Help Myself (Sugar Pie Honey Bunch)" — Four Tops	Safe
Ellie T. & Johannes	22 (3, 7, 5, 7)	Rumba	"Alone" — Heart	Safe
Molly & Carlos	35 (8, 9, 9, 9)	Foxtrot	"You Make Me Happy" — My Sun and Stars	Bottom two
Ellie S. & Nikita	33 (7, 9, 8, 9)	Charleston	"Too Darn Hot" — from Kiss Me, Kate	Eliminated
Tyler & Dianne	29 (7, 7, 7, 8)	Viennese waltz	"I've Been Loving You Too Long" — Seal	Safe
Kym & Graziano	37 (9, 9, 9, 10)	Argentine tango	"Assassin's Tango" — John Powell	Safe
Will & Nancy	33 (8, 8, 8, 9)	Quickstep	"Soda Pop" — Robbie Williams, feat. Michael Bublé	Safe
Helen & Gorka	37 (9, 9, 9, 10)	Jive	"Tightrope" — Janelle Monáe	Safe
Fleur & Vito	35 (9, 9, 8, 9)	Waltz	"I Guess That's Why They Call It the Blues" — Elton John	Safe
Tony & Katya	21 (4, 6, 5, 6)	Salsa	"I Know You Want Me (Calle Ocho)" — Pitbull & "The Bomb! (These Sounds Fall Into My Mind)" — The Bucketheads	Safe

Judges' votes to save

- Horwood: Molly & Carlos
- Mabuse: Molly & Carlos
- Du Beke: Molly & Carlos
- Ballas: Did not vote, but would have voted to save Molly & Carlos

=== Week 8 ===
Musical guests: Sheku Kanneh-Mason & Zak Abel — "Same Boat"

After initially being announced as one of the bottom two couples, Tony Adams and Katya Jones could not compete in the dance-off due to Adams having sustained a hamstring injury during their original performance. They therefore withdrew from the competition.

Couples are listed in the order they performed.

Couple	Scores	Dance	Music	Result
Ellie T. & Johannes	31 (7, 8, 8, 8)	Charleston	"Friendship" — from Anything Goes	Safe
Tyler & Dianne	31 (6, 8, 8, 9)	Paso doble	"Unstoppable" — E.S. Posthumus	Bottom two
Kym & Graziano	31 (8, 7, 8, 8)	American Smooth	"Chasing Cars" — Cinematic Pop	Safe
Helen & Gorka	32 (8, 8, 8, 8)	Salsa	"Despacito" — Luis Fonsi & Daddy Yankee, feat. Justin Bieber	Safe
Tony & Katya	24 (4, 6, 7, 7)	Jive	"Land of 1000 Dances" — Wilson Pickett	Withdrew
Molly & Carlos	37 (9, 9, 10, 9)	Rumba	"All The Man That I Need" — Whitney Houston	Safe
Fleur & Vito	39 (9, 10, 10, 10)	Samba	"Hot Hot Hot" — Arrow	Safe
Will & Nancy	38 (9, 10, 10, 9)	Waltz	"Three Times a Lady" — Commodores	Safe
Hamza & Jowita	38 (8, 10, 10, 10)	Couple's choice	"Jerusalema" — Master KG	Safe

=== Week 9: Blackpool Week ===
Musical guest: Sam Ryder — "You're The Voice" & "All The Way Over"

This week's episode was staged in the Tower Ballroom at the Blackpool Tower in Blackpool, Lancashire. Couples are listed in the order they performed.

Couple	Scores	Dance	Music	Result
Hamza & Jowita	38 (9, 9, 10, 10)	American Smooth	"New York, New York" — Frank Sinatra	Safe
Molly & Carlos	35 (8, 9, 9, 9)	Jive	"Bandstand Boogie" — Barry Manilow	Bottom two
Kym & Graziano	33 (8, 8, 8, 9)	Paso doble	"Only Girl (In the World)" — Rihanna & "We Found Love" — Rihanna, feat. Calvin Harris	Safe
Tyler & Dianne	35 (8, 9, 9, 9)	Salsa	"That's the Way (I Like It)", "(Shake, Shake, Shake) Shake Your Booty" & "Get Down Tonight" — all by KC & The Sunshine Band	Eliminated
Ellie T. & Johannes	31 (7, 8, 8, 8)	American Smooth	"You're My World" — Cilla Black	Safe
Helen & Gorka	39 (9, 10, 10, 10)	Quickstep	"Valerie" — Mark Ronson, feat. Amy Winehouse	Safe
Fleur & Vito	40 (10, 10, 10, 10)	Couple's choice	"Jumpin', Jumpin'", "Independent Women Part I" & "Lose My Breath" — all by Destiny's Child	Safe
Will & Nancy	35 (8, 9, 9, 9)	Samba	"I Go to Rio" — Hugh Jackman	Safe

Judges' votes to save

- Horwood: Molly & Carlos
- Mabuse: Molly & Carlos
- Du Beke: Tyler & Dianne
- Ballas: Molly & Carlos

=== Week 10 ===
Musical guests: Joel Corry & Tom Grennan — "Lionheart (Fearless)"

After Kym Marsh tested positive for COVID-19, she was unable to perform on the live show. Under the rules of the show, she was granted a bye to the following week.

Couples are listed in the order they performed.

Couple	Scores	Dance	Music	Result
Will & Nancy	38 (9, 10, 10, 9)	Charleston	"Hush" — Kula Shaker	Safe
Molly & Carlos	35 (8, 9, 9, 9)	Tango	"Bad Guy" — Billie Eilish	Safe
Ellie T. & Johannes	25 (5, 7, 6, 7)	Jive	"Brown Eyed Girl" — Van Morrison	Eliminated
Fleur & Vito	35 (8, 9, 9, 9)	Rumba	"Too Lost in You" — Sugababes	Bottom two
Hamza & Jowita	37 (8, 10, 10, 9)	Argentine tango	"Libertango" — Bond	Safe
Helen & Gorka	29 (5, 8, 8, 8)	Samba	"Eso Beso" — Emma Bunton	Safe

Judges' votes to save

- Horwood: Fleur & Vito
- Mabuse: Fleur & Vito
- Du Beke: Fleur & Vito
- Ballas: Did not vote, but would have voted to save Fleur & Vito

=== Week 11: Musicals Week (Quarter-final) ===
Musical guests: The cast of The Cher Show

Couples are listed in the order they performed.

Couple	Scores	Dance	Music	Musical	Result
Molly & Carlos	38 (9, 10, 10, 9)	Charleston	"Hot Honey Rag"	Chicago	Bottom two
Hamza & Jowita	36 (9, 9, 9, 9)	Samba	"He Lives in You"	The Lion King	Safe
Kym & Graziano	34 (8, 9, 9, 8)	Cha-cha-cha	"Fame"	Fame	Eliminated
Will & Nancy	39 (9, 10, 10, 10)	Foxtrot	"Sun and Moon"	Miss Saigon	Safe
Helen & Gorka	39 (9, 10, 10, 10)	Couple's choice	"Mein Herr"	Cabaret	Safe
Fleur & Vito	38 (9, 10, 9, 10)	Quickstep	"I Got Rhythm"	An American in Paris	Safe

Judges' votes to save

- Horwood: Molly & Carlos
- Mabuse: Molly & Carlos
- Du Beke: Kym & Graziano
- Ballas: Molly & Carlos

=== Week 12: Semi-final ===
Musical guest: Lewis Capaldi — "Pointless"

Each couple performed two routines. Couples are listed in the order they performed.

Couple	Scores	Dance	Music	Result
Fleur & Vito	35 (8, 9, 8, 10)	Paso doble	"The Time Is Now" — Moloko	Bottom two
Fleur & Vito	39 (9, 10, 10, 10)	Charleston	"Tu vuò fà l'americano" — Fiorello	Bottom two
Helen & Gorka	35 (8, 9, 9, 9)	Waltz	"Only One Road" — Celine Dion	Safe
Helen & Gorka	37 (9, 10, 8, 10)	Argentine tango	"Here Comes the Rain Again" — Eurythmics	Safe
Hamza & Jowita	39 (9, 10, 10, 10)	Charleston	"Pencil Full of Lead" — Paolo Nutini	Safe
Hamza & Jowita	37 (9, 10, 9, 9)	Waltz	"What The World Needs Now" — Burt Bacharach	Safe
Molly & Carlos	36 (8, 9, 9, 10)	American Smooth	"Easy On Me" — Adele	Safe
Molly & Carlos	39 (9, 10, 10, 10)	Paso doble	"Survivor" — 2WEI, feat. Edda Hayes	Safe
Will & Nancy	32 (7, 9, 7, 9)	Paso doble	"Uccen (DWTS Remix)" — Taabli Brothers	Eliminated
Will & Nancy	38 (9, 10, 9, 10)	Couple's choice	"Know How" — Young MC, "Fools Gold" — The Stone Roses & "Step On" — Happy Mondays	Eliminated

Judges' votes to save

- Horwood: Fleur & Vito
- Mabuse: Fleur & Vito
- Du Beke: Will & Nancy
- Ballas: Fleur & Vito

=== Week 13: Final ===
Musical guests: Florence and the Machine — "My Love"

Each couple performed three routines: one chosen by the judges, their showdance routine, and their favourite dance of the series. Couples are listed in the order they performed.

Couple	Scores	Dance	Music	Result
Hamza & Jowita	39 (9, 10, 10, 10)	Salsa	"Ecuador" — Sash!, feat. Rodriguez	Winners
Hamza & Jowita	34 (8, 9, 8, 9)	Showdance	"Let's Face the Music and Dance" — Irving Berlin	Winners
Hamza & Jowita	40 (10, 10, 10, 10)	Couple's choice	"Jerusalema" — Master KG	Winners
Molly & Carlos	39 (9, 10, 10, 10)	Quickstep	"Love On Top" — Beyoncé	Runners-up
Molly & Carlos	37 (8, 10, 9, 10)	Showdance	"Kiss" & "1999" — Prince	Runners-up
Molly & Carlos	39 (9, 10, 10, 10)	Rumba	"All The Man That I Need" — Whitney Houston	Runners-up
Fleur & Vito	40 (10, 10, 10, 10)	Samba	"Hot Hot Hot" — Arrow	Runners-up
Fleur & Vito	39 (9, 10, 10, 10)	Showdance	"Find Me" — Sigma, feat. Birdy	Runners-up
Fleur & Vito	40 (10, 10, 10, 10)	Couple's choice	"Jumpin', Jumpin'", "Independent Women Part I" & "Lose My Breath" — all by Destiny's Child	Runners-up
Helen & Gorka	39 (9, 10, 10, 10)	Jive	"Tightrope" — Janelle Monáe	Runners-up
Helen & Gorka	37 (8, 10, 9, 10)	Showdance	"Shine" — Emeli Sandé	Runners-up
Helen & Gorka	40 (10, 10, 10, 10)	Couple's choice	"Mein Herr" — from Cabaret	Runners-up

== Dance chart ==
The couples performed the following each week:

- Weeks 1–11: One unlearned dance
- Week 12 (Semifinals): Two unlearned dances
- Week 13 (Finals): Judges' choice, showdance & favourite dance of the series

Strictly Come Dancing (series 20) – Dance chart
Couple	Week															
Couple	1	2	3	4	5	6	7	8	9	10	11	12		13		
Hamza & Jowita	Foxtrot	Jive	Rumba	Salsa	Quickstep	Tango	Cha-cha-cha	Couple's choice	American Smooth	Argentine tango	Samba	Charleston	Waltz	Salsa	Showdance	Couple's choice
Fleur & Vito	Cha-cha-cha	Viennese waltz	American Smooth	Argentine tango	Jive	Salsa	Waltz	Samba	Couple's choice	Rumba	Quickstep	Paso doble	Charleston	Samba	Showdance	Couple's choice
Helen & Gorka	American Smooth	Cha-cha-cha	Viennese waltz	Paso doble	Charleston	Foxtrot	Jive	Salsa	Quickstep	Samba	Couple's choice	Waltz	Argentine tango	Jive	Showdance	Couple's choice
Molly & Carlos	Samba	Quickstep	Waltz	Cha-cha-cha	Couple's choice	Argentine tango	Foxtrot	Rumba	Jive	Tango	Charleston	American Smooth	Paso doble	Quickstep	Showdance	Rumba
Will & Nancy	Jive	Salsa	American Smooth	Rumba	Viennese waltz	Cha-cha-cha	Quickstep	Waltz	Samba	Charleston	Foxtrot	Paso doble	Couple's choice			
Kym & Graziano	Jive	Viennese waltz	Charleston	Samba	Quickstep	Rumba	Argentine tango	American Smooth	Paso doble		Cha-cha-cha					
Ellie T. & Johannes	Quickstep	Paso doble	Cha-cha-cha	Viennese waltz	Tango	Couple's choice	Rumba	Charleston	American Smooth	Jive						
Tyler & Dianne	American Smooth	Jive	Charleston	Couple's choice	Tango	Cha-cha-cha	Viennese waltz	Paso doble	Salsa							
Tony & Katya	Tango	Charleston	Samba	American Smooth	Cha-cha-cha	Quickstep	Salsa	Jive								
Ellie S. & Nikita	Cha-cha-cha	Waltz	Quickstep	Salsa	Paso doble	Foxtrot	Charleston									
James & Amy	Jive	Tango	Cha-cha-cha	Quickstep	Foxtrot	Charleston										
Jayde & Karen	Samba	Tango	Cha-cha-cha	American Smooth	Charleston											
Matt & Nadiya	Quickstep	Samba	Viennese waltz	Jive												
Richie & Giovanni	Cha-cha-cha	Quickstep	Samba													
Kaye & Kai	Tango	Charleston														

== Ratings ==
Weekly ratings for each show on BBC One. All ratings are provided by BARB.

Episode	Date	Official rating (millions)	Weekly rank for BBC One	Weekly rank for all UK TV	Share
Launch show	23 September	6.68	5	6	35.7%
Week 1	24 September	9.16	3	3	48.8%
Week 2	1 October	8.88	1	1	48.4%
Week 2 results	2 October	8.24	2	2	46.2%
Week 3	8 October	9.29	1	1	49.7%
Week 3 results	9 October	8.30	2	2	44.4%
Week 4	15 October	9.22	1	1	47.5%
Week 4 results	16 October	8.19	2	3	44.8%
Week 5	22 October	9.89	1	1	48.5%
Week 5 results	23 October	8.64	2	2	45.9%
Week 6	29 October	9.70	1	1	44.6%
Week 6 results	30 October	9.09	2	2	30.6%
Week 7	5 November	9.91	1	2	53.7%
Week 7 results	6 November	8.82	2	3	43.7%
Week 8	12 November	9.47	1	8	48.4%
Week 8 results	13 November	8.77	2	9	42.3%
Week 9	19 November	10.19	1	8	52.1%
Week 9 results	20 November	9.09	2	9	46.6%
Week 10	26 November	9.66	1	9	45.2%
Week 10 results	27 November	8.67	2	10	44.0%
Week 11	2 December	8.71	2	3	39.5%
Week 11 results	3 December	8.49	3	4	48.8%
Week 12	11 December	9.93	1	2	48.1%
Week 12 results	12 December	7.22	4	4	33.8%
Week 13	17 December	10.61	1	1	55.2%
Series average (excl. launch show)	2022	9.09	—N/a	—N/a	44.0%
