= Ellie Goldstein =

English model and actress (born 2001)

- Born: Ellie Jade Goldstein; 18 December 2001 (age 24); Ilford, London, England
- Occupations: Model; actress
- Years active: 2018–present
- Television: Malory Towers

Ellie Jade Goldstein (born 18 December 2001) is an English model and actress. She was the first model with Down syndrome to feature on the cover of Vogue, and appear in a campaign for Gucci. In 2025, she joined the cast of the BBC series Malory Towers as Nancy Maher and earned a Children's and Family Emmy Award nomination for her performance.

== Early life ==
Ellie Jade Goldstein was born on 18 December 2001 in Ilford, London to Mark and Yvonne Goldstein (née Slater), a Jewish family. She has Down syndrome and underwent cardiac surgery when she was five months old to close holes in her heart. Her mother was initially told that Goldstein would not be able to walk or talk.

== Career ==
Goldstein is represented by Zebedee Management and has been modelling since she was 15. She studied performing arts and has appeared in campaigns for brands including Nike, Vodafone, and Superdrug.

In November 2019, Gucci and Vogue Italia scouted Goldstein during the Photo Vogue Festival as part of their digital editorial on "Unconventional Beauty". The photo was taken by photographer David PD Hyde.” Goldstein is the first model with a disability to represent the Gucci brand and model their beauty products. Goldstein has appeared on both Good Morning Britain and Loose Women on several occasions, and in April 2023, Goldstein was interviewed on This Morning after the first Barbie doll with Down syndrome was launched by Mattel. In September 2023, Goldstein released her autobiography Against All Odds, and the following year released Ellie, a children's book about inclusivity and growing up with Down syndrome.

In April 2025, Goldstein appeared on The Great Stand Up to Cancer Bake Off. In July 2025, Goldstein made her debut in the BBC historical drama series Malory Towers, in which she played the role of Nancy Maher, the niece of Matron Kathleen (Ashley McGuire).

In August 2025, Goldstein was announced as a contestant for the twenty-third series of Strictly Come Dancing, partnering with Vito Coppola making it through to the sixth week before being eliminated in the dance-off.

== Filmography ==
Year	Title	Role	Notes	Ref.
2021	Denzel	Cathy	Short film	
2021, 2024	Good Morning Britain	Herself	Guest; 2 episodes	
2022, 2025	Loose Women	Herself	Guest; 2 episodes	
2023	This Morning	Herself	Guest; 1 episode	
2025	The Great Stand Up to Cancer Bake Off	Herself	Contestant; 1 episode	
2025	Malory Towers	Nancy Maher	Series regular	
2025	Strictly Come Dancing	Herself	Contestant; Series 23	

== Awards and nominations ==
Year	Organisation	Category	Project	Result	Ref.
2025	Children's and Family Emmy Awards	Outstanding Supporting Performer in a Preschool, Children's or Young Teen Program	Malory Towers	Nominated	
