= The Greatest Dancer =

British television series

- Genre: Dance competition
- Created by: Syco
- Directed by: Julia Knowles
- Presented by: Alesha Dixon; Jordan Banjo
- Starring: Amelia Wilson; Curtis Pritchard
- Judges: Cheryl; Oti Mabuse; Matthew Morrison; Todrick Hall
- Country of origin: United Kingdom
- Original language: English
- No. of series: 2
- No. of episodes: 18

Production
- Executive producers: Amelia Brown; Nigel Hall; Louise Hutchinson
- Producers: Iain Peckham; Clara Marshall
- Production locations: ICC Birmingham (auditions); LH2 Studios (live shows)
- Running time: 60–70 minutes
- Production companies: Thames; Syco Entertainment

Original release
- Network: BBC One
- Release: 5 January 2019 – 7 March 2020

Related
- Rising Star

The Greatest Dancer is a British dance competition television series created by Simon Cowell and produced by Syco Entertainment. The first BBC programme created by Cowell, The Greatest Dancer sees previously undiscovered dance acts perform live weekly for Cheryl, Oti Mabuse, Matthew Morrison and Todrick Hall (series 2 only) (the "Dance Captains") and a studio audience in a competition to win £50,000 and a chance to perform on Strictly Come Dancing.

The first series aired on BBC One on Saturdays from 5 January to 23 February 2019, and was won by 14-year-old solo dancer Ellie Fergusson from Livingston, West Lothian, who was mentored by Oti Mabuse. A second series premiered on 4 January 2020, with the addition of Todrick Hall to the judging panel, and Curtis Pritchard replaced Amelia Wilson as the receptionist. The series ran until 7 March 2020, when it was won by Latin and ballroom dancers Michael and Jowita, also mentored by Mabuse. On 28 April 2020, the BBC announced that were no plans for any further series of The Greatest Dancer.

== Series overview ==
- Series 1: 5 January – 23 February 2019 (8 episodes)
  - Auditions: 5–26 January 2019
  - Live shows: 2–23 February 2019
- Series 2: 4 January 2020 – 7 March 2020 (10 episodes)
  - Auditions: 4–25 January 2020
  - Live shows: 1 February–7 March 2020

Judges:

Dancer in Team Oti
Dancer in Team Matthew
Dancer in Team Cheryl
Dancer in Team Todrick

Finalist Overview
Series	Winner	Runners-up		Fourth Place	Winning Mentor	Hosts		Dance Captains (seat order)			
Series	Winner	Runners-up		Fourth Place	Winning Mentor	Hosts		1	2	3	4
1	Ellie Fergusson	Harry & Eleiyah	KLA	James & Oliver	Oti Mabuse	Alesha Dixon	Jordan Banjo	Oti	Matthew	Cheryl	N/A
2	Michael & Jowita	Harrison Vaughan	Lily & Joseph	Dancepoint	Oti Mabuse	Alesha Dixon	Jordan Banjo	Oti	Matthew	Cheryl	Todrick

== Format ==
A non-televised pilot for the show was filmed in February 2018 at Hammersmith Apollo in London.

=== Auditions ===
The auditions for the first series took place at ICC Birmingham in August of the previous year and were divided into three episodes in 2019, and four in 2020, airing each Saturday. Auditioning acts were allowed to consist of any number of members, and each person participating was required to be at least 7 years old. Each auditioning act performed in front of a one-way mirror and each audience member had a light to turn on during each audition that they liked; only acts for whom at least 75 percent of the audience turned on their lights would qualify for the callbacks. The format was adapted from the Israeli television music competition franchise Rising Star. In the second series, at the end of each audition show, one Dance Captain chose their 'Greatest Dancer Of The Day', an act of their choice which advances straight to the live shows.

=== Callbacks ===
The callbacks aired as a separate show in 2019, and immediately after the fourth round of auditions in 2020. From the acts that had qualified for the callbacks, the Dance Captains each selected three to join their team (or two in the second series as they had each already chosen a 'Greatest Dancer Of The Day' for their team previously).

=== Live Challenge ===
Each Saturday, the final acts performed to stay in the competition. Each act was assigned a different challenge, which they had to incorporate into their performance. Much like the auditions, each audience member had a light to turn on during each performance that they liked. After all acts had performed, the public were given the opportunity to vote for their favourite acts. Either one or two acts were voted off each week, eventually leaving four to compete in the final show.

=== Final ===
Each of the four acts in the final firstly perform a collaboration with their respective Dance Captain, and the act that received the fewest votes from the public finished in fourth place. The three remaining acts then each performed a reprise of the dance they performed in the auditions stage. The act that received the most votes from the public was crowned the winner and received £50,000 and a chance to perform on the next series of Strictly Come Dancing.

== Series 1 (2019) ==
=== Live show details ===
==== Acts ====
Act	No. of members	Hometown	Genre	Dance Captain	Result
Ellie	1	Livingston	Contemporary	Oti Mabuse	Winner on 23 February 2019
Harry & Eleiyah	2	Various	Contemporary	Cheryl	Finalists on 23 February 2019
KLA	8	South Wales	Latin formation	Oti Mabuse	Finalists on 23 February 2019
James & Oliver	2	Hatfield, Hertfordshire	Contemporary	Matthew Morrison	Eliminated on 23 February 2019
Dane Bates Collective	9	Various	Contemporary	Cheryl	Eliminated on 16 February 2019
Frobacks	4	London	Street	Cheryl	Eliminated on 16 February 2019
Company Jinks	14	Various	Commercial	Matthew Morrison	Eliminated on 9 February 2019
Prospects Fraternity	13	London	Street	Matthew Morrison	Eliminated on 9 February 2019
The Globe Girls	5	London	Commercial	Oti Mabuse	Eliminated on 2 February 2019

==== Week 1 (2 February) ====
- Group performance: "The Greatest" with Dance Captains
- Guest performance: Freya Ridings ("Lost Without You") with Rambert Dance Company

Order	Act	Song(s)	Challenge theme	Studio votes	Result
1	James & Oliver	"Sing Sing Sing"	Stairs	88.2%	Advanced
2	Frobacks	"Toccata and Fugue"/"O Fortuna"/"Candy Shop"/"September"/"I Just Want to Make Love to You"	Classical	95.7%	Advanced
3	Company Jinks	"Unsteady"	Chair	88.2%	Advanced
4	The Globe Girls	"Salute"/"Crazy in Love"/"Shake It Off"	Sport	80.9%	Eliminated
5	Prospects Fraternity	"A Sky Full of Stars"/"Here We Go Now"/"Colour"	Colours	95.5%	Advanced
6	Dane Bates Collective	"Runnin' (Lose It All)"	Doors	93.5%	Advanced
7	KLA	"Samba de Janeiro"/"I Like It Like That"/"Aquarela do Brasil"	Carnival	90.8%	Advanced
8	Ellie	"Bird Set Free"	Fairytale	95.7%	Advanced
9	Harry & Eleiyah	"Everybody Wants to Rule the World"	Doctor Who	96.4%	Advanced

==== Week 2 (9 February) ====
- Guest performance: Years & Years ("Play") with BalletBoyz

Order	Act	Song(s)	Challenge theme	Studio votes	Result
1	KLA	"Viva La Vida"/"A Million Dreams"	Ice	94.4%	Advanced
2	Dane Bates Collective	"What a Wonderful World"	Hollywood	90.0%	Advanced
3	Prospects Fraternity	"Rapper's Delight"/"Will 2K"	Tables	95.5%	Eliminated
4	James & Oliver	"I Dreamed a Dream"	Les Misérables	86.3%	Advanced
5	Harry & Eleiyah	"Sail"—Awolnation	Four Walls	96.2%	Advanced
6	Company Jinks	"Good Luck"	Toys	83.2%	Eliminated
7	Ellie	"Experience"—Ludovico Einaudi	Orchestra	96.3%	Advanced
8	Frobacks	"Let Me Entertain You"—Robbie Williams / "Black Magic"—Little Mix / "Strip That Down"—Liam Payne	Social Network	91.3%	Advanced

==== Week 3: Semi-final (16 February) ====
- Guest performance: The professional cast of Strictly Come Dancing and the Dance Captains

Order	Act	Song(s)	Challenge theme	Studio votes	Result
1	Harry & Eleiyah	"Beneath Your Beautiful"	Circus	97.0%	Advanced
2	KLA	"It's Raining Men"/"Proud Mary"/"Walking on Sunshine"	Umbrella	80.5%	Advanced
3	Dane Bates Collective	"Shake It Out"	Night and Day	87.1%	Eliminated
4	Frobacks	"Le Freak"/"I Got You (I Feel Good)"/"I'm Coming Out"/"Around the World"/"Celebration"	Boxes	91.2%	Eliminated
5	James & Oliver	"Salva Mea"	Space	67.4%	Advanced
6	Ellie	"Let Go for Tonight"	Chandeliers	93.8%	Advanced

==== Week 4: Final (23 February) ====
- Guest performance: Jess Glynne ("I'll Be There") with breakdance crew The Ruggeds

Dance 1: Performance with Dance Captain (one act eliminated)
Dance 2: Reprise of audition dance

Order	Act	Dance Captain	Song(s)	Result
1	KLA	Oti	"Last Dance"/"Run the World (Girls)"	Finalist
1	KLA	Oti	"The Bongo Song"/"Cuba"/"Live and Let Die"/"Rip It Up"	Finalist
2	Harry & Eleiyah	Cheryl	"Game of Survival"	Finalist
2	Harry & Eleiyah	Cheryl	"Say Something"	Finalist
3	James & Oliver	Matthew	"On Broadway"/"New York, New York"/"You Can't Stop the Beat"	Eliminated
4	Ellie	Oti	"Never Enough"	Winner
4	Ellie	Oti	"In This Shirt"	Winner

== Series 2 (2020) ==
The second series started on 4 January 2020. In a change from last year, at the end of each week a different coach was chosen to pick an act from that week to join their team. The choices were as follow:

=== Auditions ===
==== Week 1 ====
Cheryl was selected to choose a Greatest Dancer of the Day.

Act	No. of members	Genre	Song	Result
Ross and Travis	2	Street	"Let Me Clear My Throat"/"Will 2K"/"I Wanna Dance with Somebody"	Advanced to Callbacks
Los Rumberos	6	Latin		Advanced to Callbacks
Lily and Joseph	2	Contemporary	"Rise Up"	Cheryl's Greatest Dancers of the Day
Sam and Mash	2	Afro Dance	"Dangote"/"Karaoke"	Eliminated - 70%
Tom	1	Contemporary	"Turning Tables"	Advanced to Callbacks
Giovanni	1	Northern Soul		Advanced to Callbacks
Waack This Way	8	Street	"In the Hall of the Mountain King"	Eliminated - 15%
Soar Kids	12	Street	"Finesse"	Advanced to Callbacks
Patrick and Laura	2	Irish Dance	"I Want It That Way"	Advanced to Callbacks
Miss J	1	Street	"The Dance of the Sugar Plum Fairy"/"Pyro Ting"/"Hey Mama/"16 Shots"	Advanced to Callbacks
Dinkie Flowers	1	Tap	"Singin' in the Rain"/"Hawaii Five-O theme"	Advanced to Callbacks
Harrison Vaughan	1	Contemporary	"Enter the Circus"/"Game of Survival"	Advanced to Callbacks

==== Week 2 ====
Todrick Hall was selected to choose a Greatest Dancer of the Day.

Act	No. of members	Genre	Song	Result
Michael and Jowita	2	Latin	"Lollipop"/"Rock Around the Clock"/"Hey! Baby"/"Jump, Jive an' Wail"	Advanced to Callbacks
JJ Acrobatics	16	Acro Dance	"Toxic"	Advanced to Callbacks
Jake O'Shea	1	Irish Dance	"Traditional Irish Music"/"Diva"	Advanced to Callbacks
Womanhood	5	Commercial	"Ain't Your Mama"	Eliminated - 41%
Ainsley Ricketts	1	Contemporary	"Shine On You"	Todrick's Greatest Dancer of the Day
DN12	15	Commercial	"Wind It Up"/"Spice Up Your Life"/"Heads Will Roll"	Advanced to Callbacks
Aimee	1	Modern Jazz	"Rain Dance"	Advanced to Callbacks
Vale	16	Contemporary	"The Untold"	Advanced to Callbacks
Tony and Mandy	2	Latin American	"Let's Get Loud"—Jennifer Lopez	Eliminated - 45%
Renako Collective	5	Contemporary	"Human"—Rag'n'Bone Man	Advanced to Callbacks

==== Week 3 ====
Matthew Morrison was selected to choose a Greatest Dancer of the Day.

Act	No. of members	Genre	Song	Result
Dancepoint	16	Contemporary	"Somewhere Over the Rainbow"	Advanced to Callbacks
Laurence Cooke	1	Street	"Feel Good Inc."	Eliminated - 73%
The Queens	7	Jazz	"Does Your Mother Know"	Advanced to Callbacks
Hannah Martin	1	Contemporary	"Here with Me"	Matthew's Greatest Dancer of the Day
Ryan Gibson	1	Commercial	"Look What You Made Me Do"	Advanced to Callbacks
Young Dream Chasers	12	Street	"Phenomenal Woman"	Advanced to Callbacks
Tom and Jo	2	Latin	"Muevete Duro"	Advanced to Callbacks
Resilience	4	Ballet	"Power"	Eliminated - 74%
Darius and DJ G	2	Commercial	"In the Morning"/"Flowers"	Advanced to Callbacks
Jordan Crouch	1	Tap	"All of Me"	Advanced to Callbacks
Brothers of Dance	9	Contemporary	"Wicked Game"	Advanced to Callbacks

==== Week 4 ====
Oti Mabuse was selected to choose a Greatest Dancer of the Day.

Act	No. of members	Genre	Song	Result
Alex & Jacqueline	2	Ballroom	"Hurt"	Advanced to Callbacks
Elite Dance Juniors	9	Jazz	"I Can't Help Myself (Sugar Pie Honey Bunch)"/ "Ain't Too Proud to Beg"/ "Please Mr. Postman"/ "Do You Love Me"	Advanced to Callbacks
Yassaui Mergaliyev	1	Ballet	"Feeling Good"	Advanced to Callbacks
Jelli	15	Commercial	"Donatella"	Advanced to Callbacks
Jessica Larch	1	Street / Afro Dance	"Boasty"	Advanced to Callbacks
Legacy Funk	5	Street	"Treat 'em Right"	Advanced to Callbacks
Nonsuch Dancers	6	Historical Dance	"Dancing Queen"	Eliminated - 23%
Dark Angels	12	Hip-hop	"Beggin'"/"I Need a Girl (Part Two)"/"A Milli"/"Slow Motion"—Trey Songz / "Can't Hold Us"—Macklemore & Ryan Lewis /"I'm Fly"/"Dreams and Nightmares"	Oti's Greatest Dancers of the Day

=== Live show details ===
==== The Final 12 ====
Act	No. of members	Hometown	Genre	Dance Captain	Eliminations
Michael and Jowita	2	London	Latin	Oti Mabuse	Winners (7 March 2020)
Harrison Vaughan	1	Liverpool	Contemporary	Matthew Morrison	Finalists (7 March 2020)
Lily and Joseph	2	Sunderland	Contemporary	Cheryl	Finalists (7 March 2020)
Dancepoint	16	Glasgow	Contemporary	Todrick Hall	7 March 2020
Brothers of Dance	9	Various	Contemporary	Cheryl	29 February 2020
Hannah Martin	1	Burgess Hill	Contemporary	Matthew Morrison	29 February 2020
Vale	16	Stockport	Contemporary	Oti Mabuse	22 February 2020
Ainsley Ricketts	1	London	Contemporary	Todrick Hall	15 February 2020
Ross and Travis	2	Portsmouth and Bournemouth	Street	Matthew Morrison	8 February 2020
Dark Angels	12	Bristol	Hip-hop	Oti Mabuse	8 February 2020
The Queens	7	London	Jazz	Cheryl	1 February 2020
Ryan	1	Sandhurst	Commercial	Todrick Hall	1 February 2020

==== Live Challenge Shows ====
Act	Dance Captain	Live Challenge 1	Live Challenge 2	Live Challenge 3	Live Challenge 4 (Quarter-Final)	Live Challenge 5 (Semi-Final)	Grand Finale
Michael & Jowita	Oti	8th 90.5%	3rd 95.3%	3rd 92.4%	5th 90.5%	1st 96.5%	Winners (Grand Finale)
Lily & Joseph	Cheryl	4th 95.2%	4th 94.9%	1st= 93.8%	2nd 95.6%	6th 87.1%	Finalists (Grand Finale)
Harrison Vaughan	Matthew	5th= 94.2%	9th 88.8%	8th 79.8%	3rd 94.8%	2nd 93.6%	Finalists (Grand Finale)
Dancepoint	Todrick	9th 89.9%	1st 96.9%	4th 92.3%	4th 90.9%	4th 91.6%	Eliminated (Grand Finale)
Brothers of Dance	Cheryl	1st 97.8%	2nd 95.6%	5th 91.3%	1st 96.2%	3rd 92.7%	Eliminated (Semi-Final)
Hannah Martin	Matthew	5th= 94.2%	7th 90.6%	6th 89.7%	7th 81.3%	5th 88.1%	Eliminated (Semi-Final)
Vale	Oti	10th 88.9%	8th 89.3%	7th 89.2%	6th 87.0%	Eliminated (Quarter-Final)	
Ainsley Ricketts	Todrick	3rd 95.5%	6th 91.7%	1st= 93.8%	Eliminated (Live Challenge 3)		
Dark Angels	Oti	7th 92.1%	10th 87.9%	Eliminated (Live Challenge 2)			
Ross and Travis	Matthew	2nd 97.0%	5th 93.2%	Eliminated (Live Challenge 2)			
Ryan	Todrick	11th 74.6%	Eliminated (Live Challenge 1)				
The Queens	Cheryl	12th 48.4%	Eliminated (Live Challenge 1)				

===== Challenge Show 1 =====
- Theme: Best of British

Order	Act	Dance Captain	Song(s)	Challenge Theme	Studio Vote	Result
1	Dancepoint	Todrick	"Friend Like Me"	Pantomime	89.9%	Last To Be Called Safe
2	Michael and Jowita	Oti	"Kissing You"	Shakespeare	90.5%	Safe
3	Harrison Vaughan	Matthew	"Somebody's Watching Me"	Royalty	94.2%	Safe
4	The Queens	Cheryl	"A Nice Cup of Tea"/"I Believe in a Thing Called Love"	Afternoon Tea	48.4%	Eliminated
5	Ainsley Ricketts	Todrick	"No Light, No Light"	Weather	95.5%	Safe
6	Lily and Joseph	Cheryl	"Runaway Baby"	Seaside	95.2%	Safe
7	Vale	Oti	"Arrival of the Birds"	Queueing	88.9%	Safe
8	Ross and Travis	Matthew	"Boasty"/"Tragedy"/"Big for Your Boots"/"Cry Me a River"/"Where Are Ü Now"/"O Fortuna"	Secret Agents	97.0%	Safe
9	Hannah Martin	Matthew	"Lost Without You"	Telephone Box	94.2%	Safe
10	Dark Angels	Oti	"Earthquake"—Labrinth / "Shutdown"—Skepta / "Dance Off"—Macklemore & Ryan Lewis / "High Hopes"—Panic! at the Disco	House of Commons	92.1%	Safe
11	Ryan Gibson	Todrick	"These Boots Are Made for Walkin'"/"Soul Bossa Nova"/"Work It Out"	The Sixties	74.6%	Eliminated
12	Brothers of Dance	Cheryl	"Red Right Hand"/"Glory"	Peaky Blinders	97.8%	Safe

===== Challenge Show 2 =====
- Theme: Props

Order	Act	Dance Captain	Song(s)	Challenge Theme	Studio Vote	Result
1	Brothers of Dance	Cheryl	"Live Like Legends"	Chessboard	95.6%	Safe
2	Michael and Jowita	Oti	"Crazy in Love"/"Bang Bang"	Canes	95.3%	Safe
3	Harrison Vaughan	Matthew	"Perfect"	Jewellery Box	88.8%	Safe
4	Vale	Oti	"Time"	Clocks	89.3%	Last To Be Called Safe
5	Lily and Joseph	Cheryl	"A Million Dreams"	Books	94.9%	Safe
6	Ainsley Ricketts	Todrick	"Unspoken"	Bench	91.7%	Safe
7	Ross and Travis	Matthew	"September"/"Steamy Windows"/"Instruction"/"This Is How We Do It"/"I Just Want to Make Love to You"/"Sweet Lovin'"	Ladders	93.2%	Eliminated
8	Hannah Martin	Matthew	"Alive"	Silk	90.6%	Safe
9	Dark Angels	Oti	"La La La"/"Gecko"	Mobile Phones	87.9%	Eliminated
10	Dancepoint	Todrick	"In the Air Tonight"	Mirror	96.9%	Safe

===== Challenge Show 3 =====
- Theme: Around the World

Order	Act	Mentor	Song(s)	Challenge Theme	Studio Vote	Result
1	Lily and Joseph	Cheryl	"You Are the Reason"—Calum Scott	Iceland	93.8%	Safe
2	Ainsley Ricketts	Todrick Hall	"Giant"—Calvin Harris and Rag'n'Bone Man	Rio de Janeiro	93.8%	Eliminated
3	Vale	Oti Mabuse	"Insomnia"—Faithless	Cairo	89.2%	Safe
4	Harrison Vaughan	Matthew Morrison	"Smile"	Paris	79.8%	Safe
5	Dancepoint	Todrick Hall	"Gravity"	Beijing	92.3%	Safe
6	Michael and Jowita	Oti Mabuse	"Get the Party Started"—Pink	Monte Carlo	92.4%	Safe
7	Brothers of Dance	Cheryl	"Sparrow"—Emeli Sandé	The Amazon	91.3%	Last To Be Called Safe
8	Hannah Martin	Matthew Morrison	"Where We Come Alive" - Ruelle	Athens	89.7%	Safe

===== Challenge Show 4 (Quarter-Final) =====
- Theme: Dance Fusion

Order	Act	Dance Captain	Song(s)	Challenge Theme	Studio Vote	Result
1	Harrison Vaughan	Matthew	"Sing Sing Sing (With a Swing)"	Tap	94.8%	Safe
2	Vale	Oti	"Soon We'll Be Found"—Sia	Ballroom	87.0%	Eliminated
3	Lily & Joseph	Cheryl	"You Can't Stop the Beat"	Rock'n'Roll	95.6%	Safe
4	Hannah Martin	Matthew	"Havana"—Camila Cabello	Latin	81.3%	Safe
5	Brothers of Dance	Cheryl	"Don't Start Now"—Dua Lipa	Commercial	96.2%	Safe
6	Dancepoint	Todrick	"Swan Lake"	Ballet	90.9%	Last To Be Called Safe
7	Michael & Jowita	Oti	"Your Disco Needs You"—Kylie Minogue / "You Should Be Dancing"—Bee Gees / "Le Freak"—Chic / "Boogie Wonderland"—Earth, Wind & Fire with The Emotions	Disco	90.5%	Safe

===== Challenge Show 5 (Semi Final) =====
- Theme: Coaches' Pick

Order	Act	Dance Captain	Song(s)	Challenge Theme	Studio Vote	Result
1	Dancepoint	Todrick	"Get Happy"	Classic Hollywood	91.6%	Last to be called safe
2	Michael and Jowita	Oti	"Do You Love Me" / "(I've Had) The Time of My Life"	Dirty Dancing	96.5%	Safe
3	Hannah Martin	Matthew	"Clubbed to Death"—Rob Dougan	Ocean	88.1%	Eliminated
4	Lily and Joseph	Cheryl	"A Sky Full of Stars"—Coldplay	Childhood Dreams	87.1%	Safe
5	Brothers of Dance	Cheryl	"Rumble"	Military	92.7%	Eliminated
6	Harrison Vaughan	Matthew	"Saturday Night's Alright for Fighting"—Elton John	Elton John	93.6%	Safe

===== Grand Final =====
Dance 1: Performance with Dance Captain (one act eliminated)
Dance 2: Reprise of favourite dance

Order	Act	Dance Captain	Song(s)	Result
1	Dancepoint	Todrick	"Nails, Hair, Hips, Heels"/"Dem Beats"	Eliminated
2	Lily and Joseph	Cheryl	"Pure Imagination"	Top 3
2	Lily and Joseph	Cheryl	"Rise Up"—Andra Day	Top 3
3	Michael and Jowita	Oti	"The Ballroom Blitz"	Top Of Public Vote
3	Michael and Jowita	Oti	"Get the Party Started"—Pink	Top Of Public Vote
4	Harrison Vaughan	Matthew	"Soda Pop"	Top 3
4	Harrison Vaughan	Matthew	"Enter the Circus"/"Game of Survival"	Top 3

== Judges, receptionist and presenters ==
=== Overview ===
Key
Presenter of The Greatest Dancer
Receptionist of The Greatest Dancer
Dance Captain of The Greatest Dancer

Cast member	Series	
Cast member	1	2
Alesha Dixon	Host	Host
Jordan Banjo	Host	Host
Amelia Wilson	Recurring	-
Curtis Pritchard	-	Recurring
Cheryl	Main	Main
Matthew Morrison	Main	Main
Oti Mabuse	Main	Main
Todrick Hall	-	Main

=== Presenters ===
On 19 July 2018, it was announced that Alesha Dixon and Jordan Banjo would host the programme.

Presenters gallery

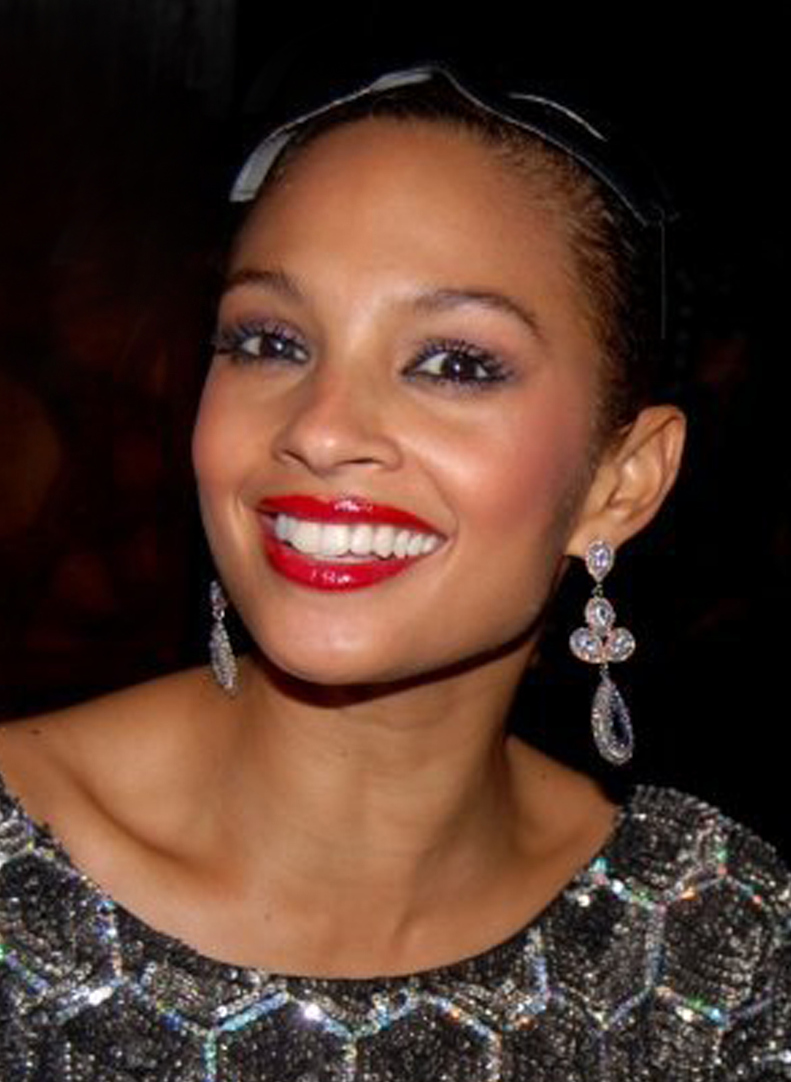
Alesha Dixon (2019–20)

=== Dance panel ===
On 10 August 2018, it was announced that the show's Dance Captains were Cheryl, Matthew Morrison and Oti Mabuse. For the 2020 series, dancer Todrick Hall joined as the fourth Dance Captain.

Dance Captains gallery

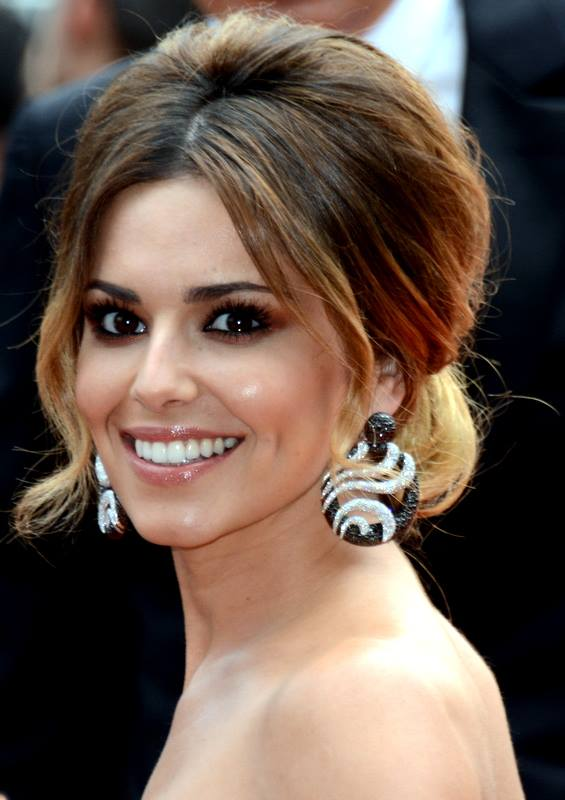
Cheryl (2019–20)

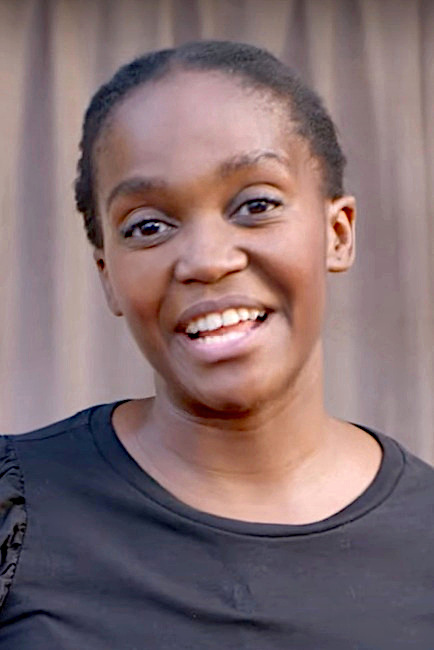
Oti Mabuse (2019–20)

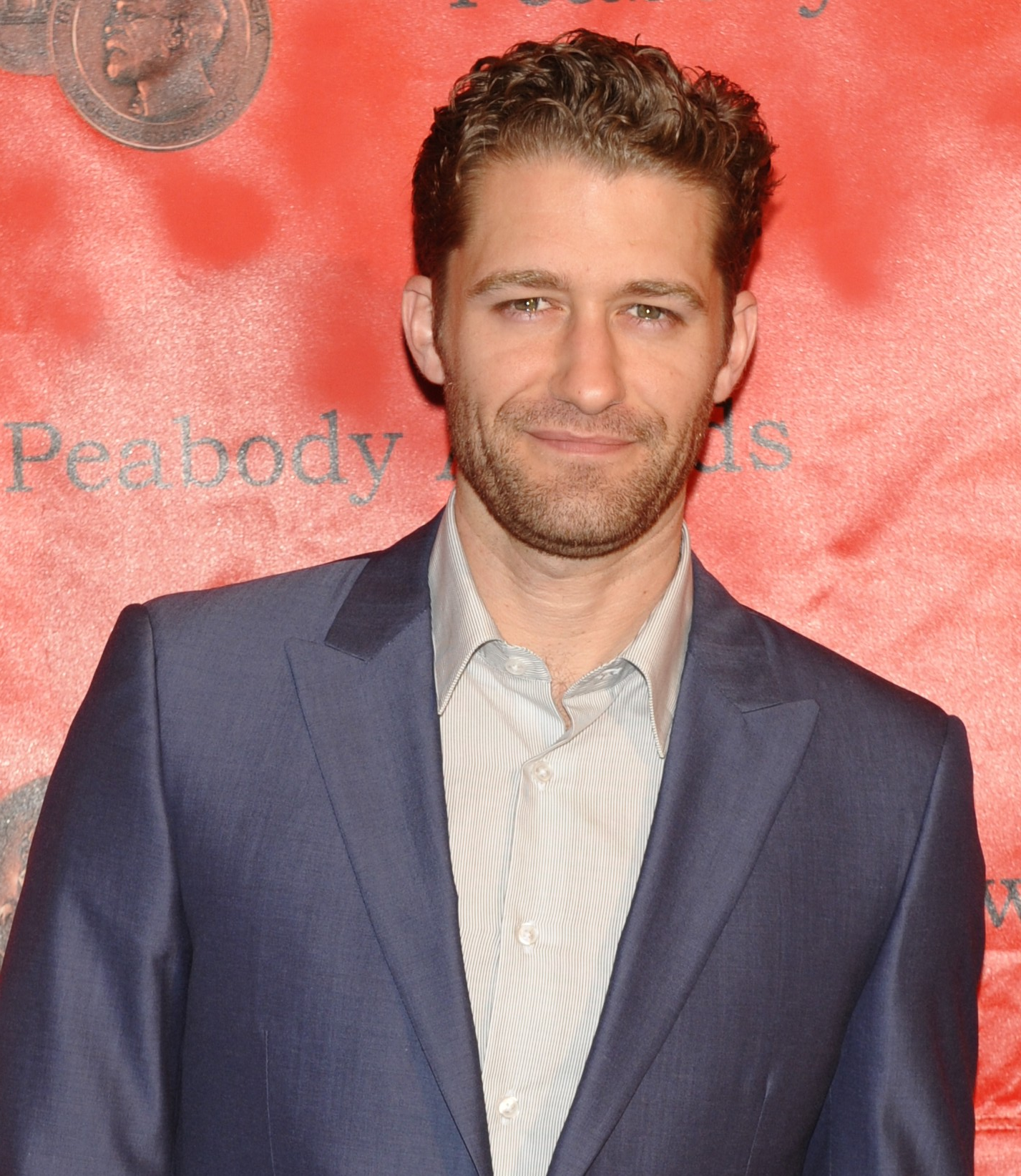
Matthew Morrison (2019–20)

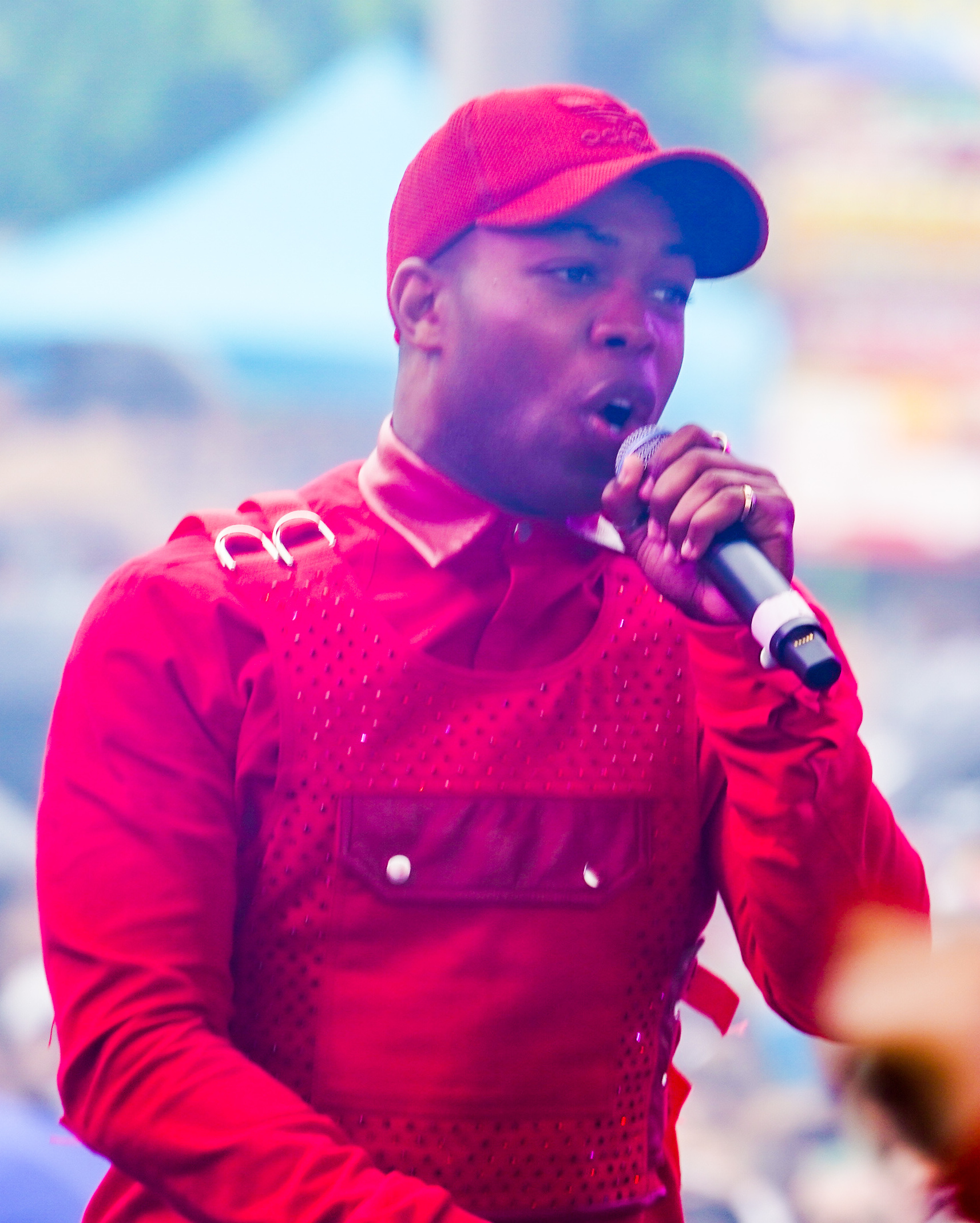
Todrick Hall (2020)

== International versions ==
The format has been sold to broadcasters in China, Denmark, Spain and Belgium (North and South).

Region/country	Local title	Network	Winners	Dance Captains	Presenter(s)
China	The Greatest Dancer China	Dragon TV	Series 1, 2020: Li Yi Ran	Jin Xing; Tong Liya; Ren Jialun; Zhu Zhengting	Cheng Lei
Denmark	Den Vildeste Danser	TV2	Series 1, 2020: Olivia Obiefule	Sonny Fredie-Pedersen; Silas Holst; Mille Gori	Christiane Schaumburg-Müller; Christopher Læssø
Spain	The Dancer	La 1	Series 1, 2021: Macarena Ramírez	Lola Índigo; Miguel Ángel Muñoz; Rafa Méndez	Ion Aramendi; Sandra Cervera
Belgium (Wallonia)	The Dancer	La Une	Series 1, 2023: Fusion	Laurien Decibel; Aurel Zola; Agustin Galiana	Sara De Paduwa; Ivan
Belgium (Flanders)	The Greatest Dancer van Vlaanderen	Eén	Series 1, 2023: ?	Annabelle Lopez Ochoa; Laurien Decibel; Niels Destadsbader	Siska Schoeters; Aster Nzeyimana
