= Hamza Yassin =

Sudanese-born British TV presenter (born 1990)

- Born: Hamza Ahmed Yassin; 22 February 1990 (age 36); Sudan
- Education: Wellingborough School
- Alma mater: Bangor University (BSc); University of Nottingham (MSc)
- Occupations: Cameraman; TV presenter; President of The Camping and Caravanning Club

Hamza Ahmed Yassin (born 22 February 1990) is a British wildlife cameraman and presenter, known for his role as Ranger Hamza on the children's television channel CBeebies, his work on shows such as Countryfile and Animal Park and for presenting programmes about Scottish wildlife. In 2022, he won the twentieth series of the BBC contest Strictly Come Dancing alongside Jowita Przystał.

== Early life and education ==
Yassin was born in Sudan on 22 February 1990. His parents worked as gynaecologists. The family moved to Northampton in the UK when Hamza was eight years old. When he arrived in the UK, he only spoke four words of English: he began to learn the language by watching David Attenborough's series The Life of Birds. After being diagnosed as dyslexic as a teenager while a student at Wellingborough School, he was supported throughout the rest of his studies. He went on to achieve a degree in Zoology with Conservation from Bangor University and a Masters in Biological Photography and Imaging from the University of Nottingham.

== Career ==
When he was 21, Yassin moved to the Scottish Highlands to study the local wildlife and develop his career as a wildlife photographer; He lived in his car and did odd jobs for people who lived in the villages he was staying in, to earn enough to fund his job. He has been living in Kilchoan since before 2020.

Yassin is known for the CBeebies shows Let's Go for a Walk, in the role of Ranger Hamza; he has written a book based on the series. In late 2020, he presented Scotland: My Life in the Wild, a one-off Channel 4 documentary about his life and the wildlife living on the Ardnamurchan peninsula in the Highlands of Scotland.

Yassin has appeared on The One Show and as a guest presenter on Countryfile, and in 2021 he joined the BBC series Animal Park about the lives of keepers and animals at Longleat Safari Park. In the same year, he presented Scotland: Escape to the Wilderness, a four-part Channel 4 series in which he took four celebrities (Martin Clunes, Baroness Warsi, Ben Miller and Richard Coles) to wild locations around Scotland, showing them the local wildlife.

In 2022, he appeared as a contestant on the twentieth series of Strictly Come Dancing, partnered with Jowita Przystał. On 17 December 2022, despite finishing bottom of the leaderboard in the final, they were announced as winners of the series.

In July 2022, he was awarded an Honorary Degree by Bangor University.

In October 2023, he became the 12th President of The Camping and Caravanning Club. Hamza is a regular tent camper and also owns a campervan.

In October 2025, the BBC announced Hamza's Hidden Wild Isles, a four-episode series with each episode covering a different season of the year.

== Books ==
Let's Go for a Walk. Ivy Kids, 2021. ISBN 978-0-7112-6445-8

Homeward Bound. Gaia, 2025. ISBN 978-1-85675-542-9
