= Carlos Gu =

Chinese dancer and choreographer (born 1993)

- 古堃玄
- Born: January 6, 1993 (age 33); Taiyuan, China
- Occupations: Dancer; choreographer
- Known for: Strictly Come Dancing

Carlos Gu (Chinese: 古堃玄; pinyin: Gǔ Kūnxuán; born 1993) is a Chinese dancer and choreographer. He is best known for being a professional dancer on the British BBC One television series Strictly Come Dancing since 2022.

== Life and career ==
Gu was born in Taiyuan China on 6 January 1993. He has competed in numerous competitions and is a Chinese National Champion. Along with his professional partner Susan Sun, he has competed in dance championships in China and around the world.

=== Strictly Come Dancing ===
In July 2022, it was announced that Gu would become a professional dancer on the 20th series of Strictly Come Dancing, as part of four new professionals joining the show along with Vito Coppola, Lauren Oakley and Michelle Tsiakkas. Ahead of joining the show, Gu said "I'm thrilled to join Strictly and very excited to get started. It's a new chapter of my life and a new challenge as well. I'm absolutely ready to take on this journey and to shine." He was paired with singer and actress Molly Rainford for his first series and they reached the final, before finishing as the runners-up. Gu later embarked on the Strictly Come Dancing Live! tour. Gu returned for the 21st series and was paired with television presenter Angela Scanlon; they were eliminated in week 10. Gu returned for 23rd series where he was paired with former footballer Karen Carney and won his first series, becoming the first Chinese professional dancer to win.

Series	Partner	Place	Average score
20	Molly Rainford	2nd	35.4
21	Angela Scanlon	6th	30.5
23	Karen Carney	1st	33.9
24	Jaime Winstone	8th	27.6

Highest and lowest scoring per dance
Dance	Partner	Highest	Partner	Lowest
American Smooth	Molly Rainford	36	Angela Scanlon	28
Argentine tango	Karen Carney	40	Molly Rainford	33
Cha-cha-cha	Molly Rainford	35	Jamie Winstone	21
Charleston	Molly Rainford	38	Angela Scanlon; Karen Carney	35
Couple's choice	Karen Carney	40	Molly Rainford	30
Foxtrot	Molly Rainford	35	Jamie Winstone	25
Instant Dance	Karen Carney	1		
Jive	Karen Carney	40	Angela Scanlon	29
Paso doble	Molly Rainford; Karen Carney	39	Angela Scanlon	33
Quickstep	Molly Rainford	39	Karen Carney	27
Rumba	Molly Rainford	39	Karen Carney	28
Salsa	Karen Carney	39		
Samba	Karen Carney	34	Angela Scanlon	27
Showdance	Molly Rainford; Karen Carney	37		
Tango	Molly Rainford	35	Karen Carney	20
Viennese waltz	Angela Scanlon Jaime Winstone	28		
Waltz	Karen Carney	39	Angela Scanlon	33

==== Series 20: with Molly Rainford ====
Week	Dance/Song	Judges' score				Total	Result
Week	Dance/Song	Horwood	Mabuse	Ballas	Du Beke	Total	Result
1	Samba / "Kiss My (Uh-Oh)"	7	8	8	8	31	No elimination
2	Quickstep / "Love On Top"	8	9	9	8	34	Safe
3	Waltz / "One Hand, One Heart"	8	9	9	8	34	Safe
4	Cha-Cha-Cha / "Do What I Do"	8	9	9	9	35	Safe
5	Couple's Choice / "Chicken Man"	6	8	8	8	30	Bottom two
6	Argentine Tango / "Running Up That Hill"	6	9	9	9	33	Safe
7	Foxtrot / "You Make Me Happy"	8	9	9	9	35	Bottom two
8	Rumba / "All the Man That I Need"	9	9	10	9	37	Safe
9	Jive / "Bandstand Boogie"	8	9	9	9	35	Bottom two
10	Tango / "Bad Guy"	8	9	9	9	35	Safe
11	Charleston / "Hot Honey Rag"	9	10	10	9	38	Bottom two
12	American Smooth / "Easy on Me"	8	9	9	10	36	Safe
12	Paso Doble / "Survivor"	9	10	10	10	39	Safe
13	Quickstep / "Love On Top"	9	10	10	10	39	Runners-up
13	Showdance / "Kiss" & "1999"	8	10	9	10	37	Runners-up
13	Rumba / "All the Man That I Need"	9	10	10	10	39	Runners-up

- Green number indicates when Molly & Carlos were at the top of the leaderboard.
- Red number indicates when Molly & Carlos were at the bottom of the leaderboard.

==== Series 21: with Angela Scanlon ====
Week	Dance/Song	Judges' score				Total	Result
Week	Dance/Song	Horwood	Mabuse	Ballas	Du Beke	Total	Result
1	Tango / "Prisoner"	6	6	5	6	23	No elimination
2	Jive / "Trouble"	7	7	7	8	29	Safe
3	Charleston / "Who's Got the Pain"	9	9	8	9	35	Safe
4	Viennese waltz / "You Are the Reason"	7	7	7	7	28	Safe
5	American Smooth / "Cherish"	6	7	7	8	28	Safe
6	Paso Doble / "BLACK swan SWAN lake"	8	8	8	9	33	Safe
7	Samba / "Ain't It Funny"	6	7	7	7	27	Safe
8	Waltz / "With You I'm Born Again"	7	9	8	9	33	Safe
9	Argentine Tango / "Back to Black"	8	10	10	10	38	Safe
10	Cha-cha-cha / "I Will Survive"	7	7	8	9	31	Safe

- Green number indicates when Angela & Carlos were at the top of the leaderboard.
- Red number indicates when Angela & Carlos were at the bottom of the leaderboard.

==== Series 23: with Karen Carney ====
Week	Dance/Song	Judges' score				Total	Result
Week	Dance/Song	Horwood	Mabuse	Ballas	Du Beke	Total	Result
1	Jive / "One Way or Another"	7	8	8	8	31	No elimination
2	Tango / "Training Season"	4	5	5	6	20	Safe
3	Cha-cha-cha / "She's A Lady"	4	7	7	7	25	Safe
4	Quickstep / "Marvelous Party"	6	7	7	7	27	Safe
5	Rumba / "Think Twice"	7	7	7	7	28	Safe
6	Argentine Tango / "Red Right Hand"	9	10	9	10	38	Safe
7	Charleston / "Upside Down"	8	10	8	9	35	Safe
8	American Smooth / "You Don't Own Me"	7	8	8	8	31	Safe
9	Paso doble / "O Fortuna"	9	10	10	10	39	No elimination
10	Couple's Choice / "Born This Way"	10	10	10	10	40 (Note: The couple also received one extra point for their Cha-cha-cha to "Beggin'" by The Four Seasons in the Instant Dance.)	Safe
11	Samba / "The Rhythm of Life"	8	8	9	9	34	Safe
12	Waltz / "One Moment in Time"	9	10	10	10	39	Safe
12	Salsa / "Turn the Beat Around"	9	10	10	10	39	Safe
13	Argentine Tango / "Red Right Hand"	10	10	10	10	40	Winners
13	Showdance / "Inner Smile"	8	10	9	10	37	Winners
13	Jive / "One Way or Another"	10	10	10	10	40	Winners

- Green number indicates when Karen & Carlos were at the top of the leaderboard.
- Red number indicates when Karen & Carlos were at the bottom of the leaderboard.

=== Dance tours ===
In spring 2025, Gu toured with fellow Strictly professional Amy Dowden. In November 2025, Gu announced his appearance at Dancing With The Stars Weekends 2026.

== Personal life ==
Gu is gay and in July 2024 he spoke with Lorraine Kelly on her eponymous ITV show, to come out and to talk about LGBTQ rights in China, saying that homosexuality is not discussed in public there and that that was part of his rationale for moving to the UK, but that his mother was very supportive. A year later, speaking to Hello!, he said that he grew up "different from the stereotype of the boys" and came out so that he could be a role model for "more Asian kids, or the kids out there who are still figuring themselves out". He also talked about a culture of homophobia in dance in China, but that he had been able to look up to his own teacher, a gay 9-time world champion, as a positive role model as a teenager.

In 2025, Gu shared his first artwork, titled Reborn, telling Hello! how he had enjoyed drawing and painting, but had been forced to focus on dance as a child. He told Hello! that he started drawing again in 2024 and spent 2 months on Reborn as a meditative piece.
