= Strictly Come Dancing series 4 =

Strictly Come Dancing
- Series 4
- Presented by: Bruce Forsyth; Tess Daly
- Judges: Len Goodman; Arlene Phillips; Craig Revel Horwood; Bruno Tonioli
- Celebrity winner: Mark Ramprakash
- Professional winner: Karen Hardy
- No. of episodes: 24

Release
- Original network: BBC One
- Original release: 7 October – 23 December 2006

Series chronology
- ← Previous; Series 3 Next → Series 5

Strictly Come Dancing returned for its fourth series on 7 October 2006. Bruce Forsyth and Tess Daly returned to co-present the main show on BBC One, while Claudia Winkleman returned to present the spin-off show Strictly Come Dancing: It Takes Two on BBC Two. Len Goodman, Arlene Phillips, Craig Revel Horwood, and Bruno Tonioli returned as judges.

Mark Ramprakash and Karen Hardy were announced as the winners on 23 December, while England rugby player Matt Dawson and Lilia Kopylova finished in second place.

== Format ==
Hosts and Judges for Strictly Come Dancing (Series 4)

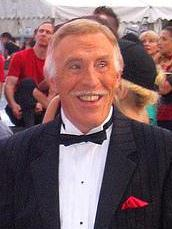
Bruce Forsyth

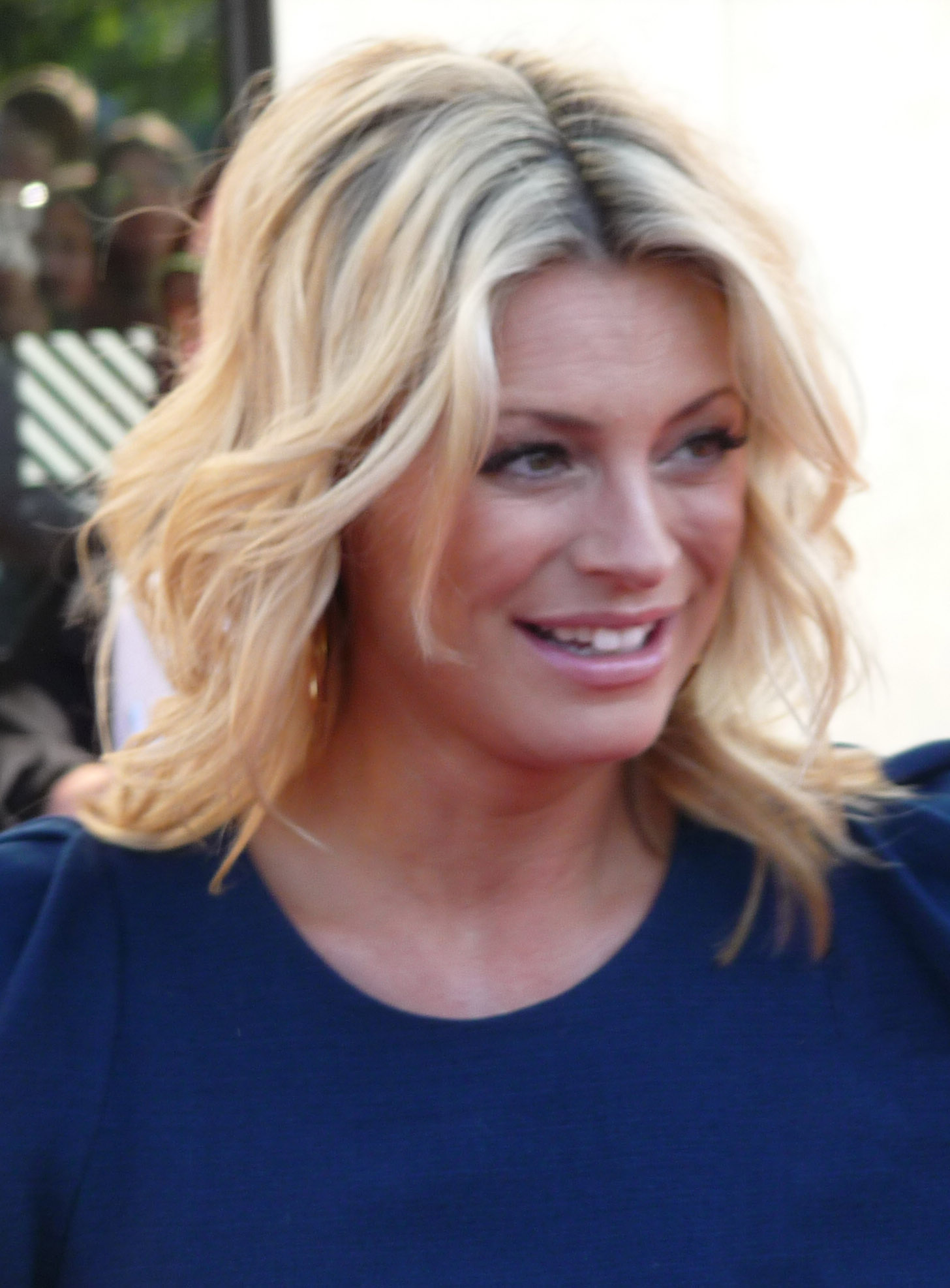
Tess Daly

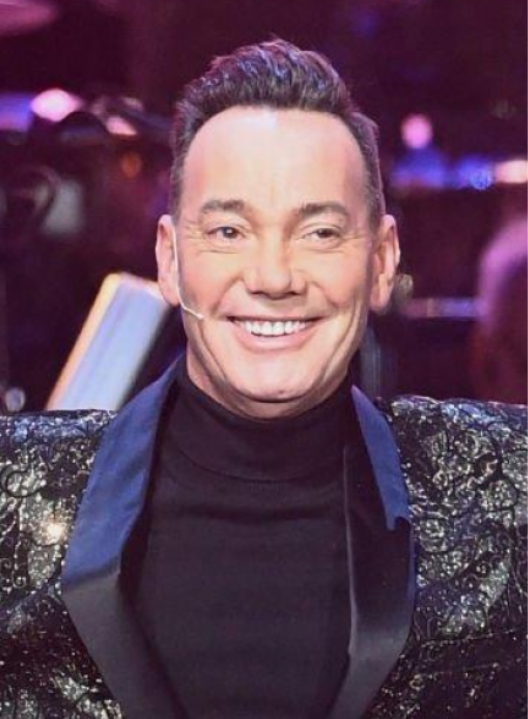
Craig Revel Horwood

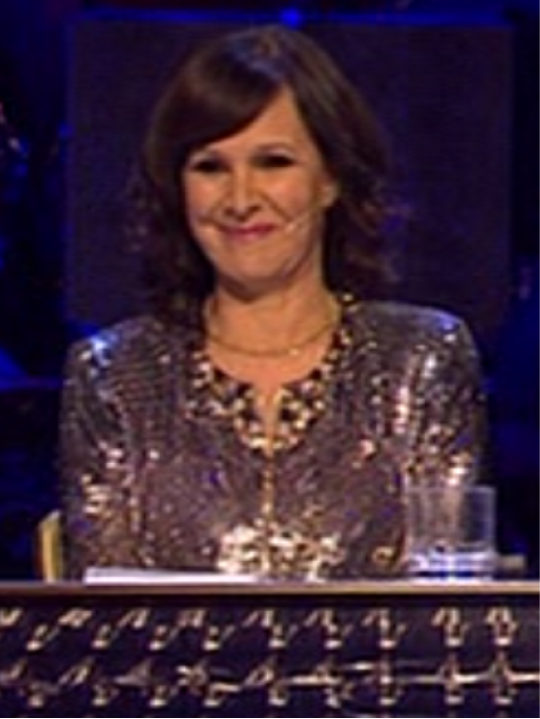
Arlene Phillips

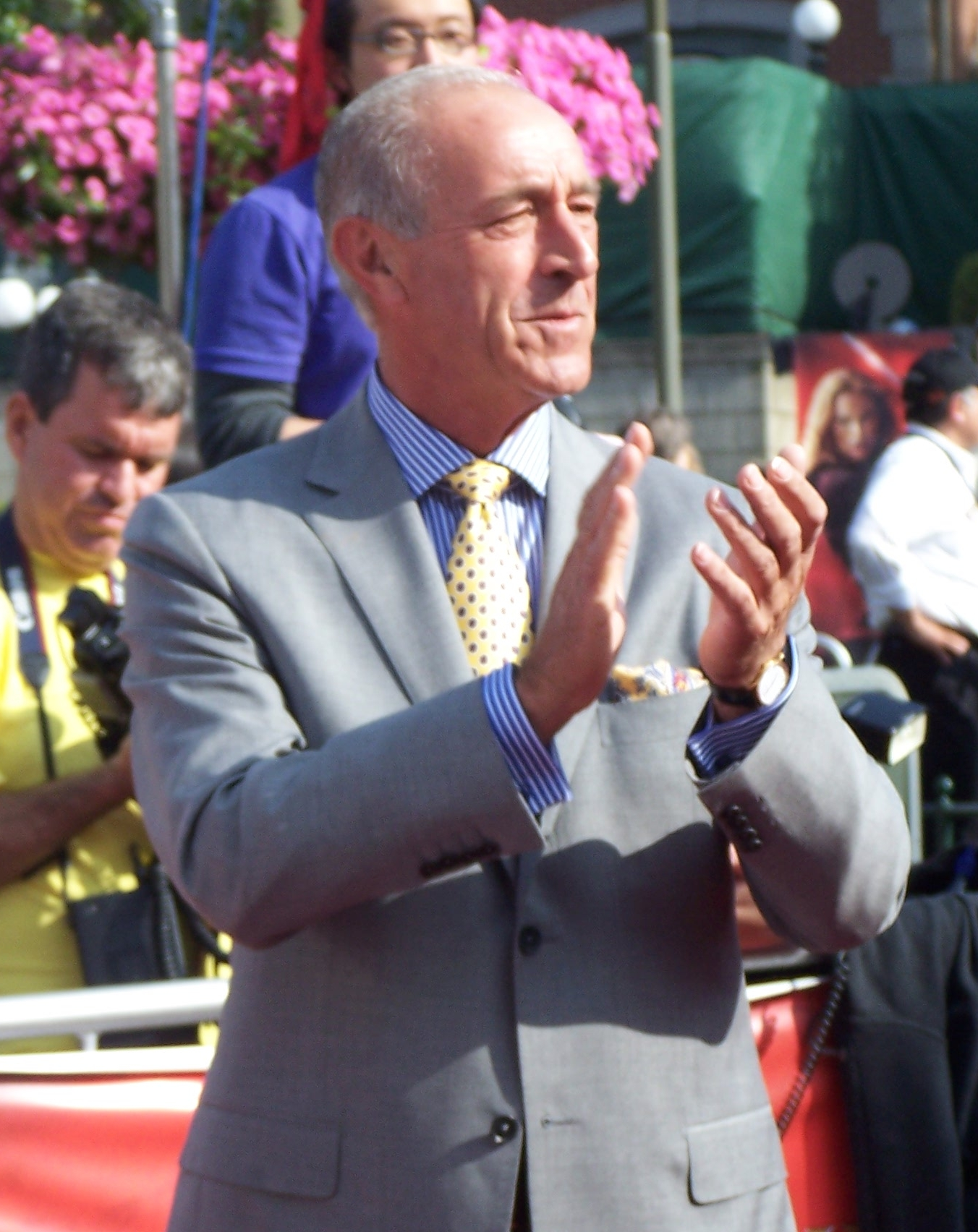
Len Goodman

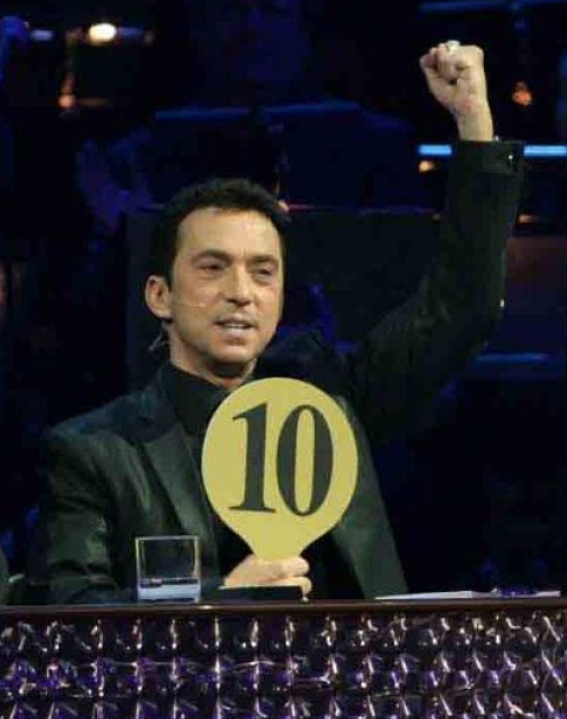
Bruno Tonioli

The couples dance each week in a live show. The judges score each performance out of ten. The couples are then ranked according to the judges' scores and given points according to their rank, with the lowest scored couple receiving one point, and the highest scored couple receiving the most points (the maximum number of points available depends on the number of couples remaining in the competition). The public are also invited to vote for their favourite couples, and the couples are ranked again according to the number of votes they receive, again receiving points; the couple with the fewest votes receiving one point, and the couple with the most votes receiving the most points.

The points for judges' score and public vote are then added together, and the two couples with the fewest points are placed in the bottom two. If two couples have equal points, the points from the public vote are given precedence.

== Couples ==
This season featured fourteen celebrity contestants.

Celebrity	Notability	Professional partner	Status
Nicholas Owen	ITV News presenter & journalist	Nicole Cutler	Eliminated 1st on 7 October 2006
Mica Paris	Singer & television presenter	Ian Waite	Eliminated 2nd on 14 October 2006
Jimmy Tarbuck	Comedian & television presenter	Flavia Cacace	Withdrew on 21 October 2006
DJ Spoony	DJ & BBC Radio 1 presenter	Ola Jordan	Eliminated 3rd on 21 October 2006
Georgina Bouzova	Casualty actress	James Jordan	Eliminated 4th on 28 October 2006
Jan Ravens	Actress & impressionist	Anton Du Beke	Eliminated 5th on 4 November 2006
Ray Fearon	Stage & screen actor	Camilla Dallerup	Eliminated 6th on 11 November 2006
Peter Schmeichel	Manchester United goalkeeper	Erin Boag	Eliminated 7th on 18 November 2006
Claire King	Emmerdale actress	Brendan Cole	Eliminated 8th on 25 November 2006
Carol Smillie	Television presenter	Matthew Cutler	Eliminated 9th on 2 December 2006
Louisa Lytton	EastEnders actress	Vincent Simone	Eliminated 10th on 9 December 2006
Emma Bunton	Spice Girls singer	Darren Bennett	Eliminated 11th on 16 December 2006
Matt Dawson	England rugby player	Lilia Kopylova	Runners-up on 23 December 2006
Mark Ramprakash	England cricketer	Karen Hardy	Winners on 23 December 2006

== Scoring chart ==
The highest score each week is indicated in bold green with a dagger (†), while the lowest score each week is indicated in italicized red with a double-dagger (‡).

Color key:

Winners
Runners-up
Bottom two
Withdrew from competition
Eliminated

Strictly Come Dancing (series 4) - Weekly scores
Couple	Pl.	Week											
Couple	Pl.	1	2	3	4	5	6	7	8	9	10	11	12
Mark & Karen	1st	**27**†	—N/a	32	**35**†	**36**†	33	27	**36**†	28+36=64	36+27=63	34+39=**73**†	34+40+36=**110**† (Note: This couple finished in first place.)
Matt & Lilia	2nd	19	—N/a	30	28	25	34	**37**†	28	34+27=61‡	29+32=61	35+30=65‡	38+31+36=105‡ (Note: This couple finished in second place.)
Emma & Darren	3rd	—N/a	**33**†	33	30	34	**36**†	30 (Note: This couple was in the bottom two, but was not eliminated.)	34	37+37=**74**†	35+34=**69**†	36+33=69 (Note: This couple was eliminated.)	
Louisa & Vincent	4th	—N/a	28	**36**†	26	29	32	35	34	33+36=69	31+28=59‡		
Carol & Matthew	5th	—N/a	25	27	29	29	27	30	30	34+34=68			
Claire & Brendan	6th	—N/a	21	22	24	21‡	32	29	25‡				
Peter & Erin	7th	25	—N/a	31	19‡	28	19‡	26‡					
Ray & Camilla	8th	**27**†	—N/a	29	30	35	26						
Jan & Anton	9th	—N/a	24	18‡	24	25							
Georgina & James	10th	—N/a	14‡	18‡	26								
DJ Spoony & Ola	11th	**27**†	—N/a	27									
Jimmy & Flavia	12th	17	—N/a	(Note: This couple withdrew from the competition.)									
Mica & Ian	13th	—N/a	20										
Nicholas & Nicole	14th	14‡											

=== Average chart ===
This table only counts for dances scored on a traditional 40-point scale.

Couple	Rank by average	Total points	Number of dances	Total average
Emma & Darren	1st	442	13	34.0
Mark & Karen	2nd	536	16	33.5
Louisa & Vincent	3rd	348	11	31.6
Matt & Lilia	4th	493	16	30.8
Carol & Matthew	5th	265	9	29.4
Ray & Camilla	5th	147	5	29.4
DJ Spoony & Ola	6th	54	2	27.0
Claire & Brendan	7th	174	7	24.9
Peter & Erin	8th	148	6	24.7
Jan & Anton	9th	91	4	22.8
Mica & Ian	10th	20	1	20.0
Georgina & James	11th	58	3	19.3
Jimmy & Flavia	12th	17	1	17.0
Nicholas & Nicole	13th	14	1	14.0

== Weekly scores ==
Unless indicated otherwise, individual judges scores in the charts below (given in parentheses) are listed in this order from left to right: Craig Revel Horwood, Arlene Phillips, Len Goodman, Bruno Tonioli.

=== Week 1 ===
Only half of the couples performed this week, and they performed either the cha-cha-cha or the waltz. The couples who did not compete this week performed a group mambo that was not scored. Couples are listed in the order they performed.

Couple	Scores	Dance	Music	Result
Matt & Lilia	19 (2, 5, 6, 6)	Cha-cha-cha	"(I Can't Get No) Satisfaction" — The Rolling Stones	Safe
Nicholas & Nicole	14 (2, 2, 5, 5)	Waltz	"(You Make Me Feel Like) A Natural Woman" — Aretha Franklin	Eliminated
Ray & Camilla	27 (6, 6, 7, 8)	Cha-cha-cha	"Can You Feel It?" — The Jacksons	Safe
Peter & Erin	25 (6, 5, 7, 7)	Waltz	"The Greatest Love of All" — Whitney Houston	Safe
DJ Spoony & Ola	27 (5, 7, 8, 7)	Cha-cha-cha	"Kiss" — Prince	Safe
Jimmy & Flavia	17 (3, 4, 5, 5)	Waltz	"See The Day" — Dee C. Lee	Bottom two
Mark & Karen	27 (7, 7, 7, 6)	Cha-cha-cha	"Let's Get Loud" — Jennifer Lopez	Safe

=== Week 2 ===
Couples performed either the quickstep or the rumba. The couples who did not compete this week performed a group swing dance that was not scored. Couples are listed in the order they performed.

Couple	Scores	Dance	Music	Result
Carol & Matthew	25 (7, 5, 6, 7)	Quickstep	"9 to 5" — Dolly Parton	Safe
Mica & Ian	20 (3, 5, 6, 6)	Rumba	"You Give Me Something" — James Morrison	Eliminated
Louisa & Vincent	28 (7, 8, 6, 7)	Quickstep	"Don't Get Me Wrong" — The Pretenders	Safe
Georgina & James	14 (3, 2, 5, 4)	Rumba	"Let's Get It On" — Marvin Gaye	Bottom two
Jan & Anton	24 (6, 6, 6, 6)	Quickstep	"When You're Smiling" — Louis Armstrong	Safe
Claire & Brendan	21 (7, 4, 4, 6)	Rumba	"Show Me Heaven" — Maria McKee	Safe
Emma & Darren	33 (8, 8, 8, 9)	Quickstep	"I Got Rhythm" — Bobby Darin	Safe

=== Week 3 ===
Jimmy Tarbuck chose to withdraw from the competition on the advice of his doctor due to high blood pressure.

Couples performed either the jive or the tango, and are listed in the order they performed.

Couple	Scores	Dance	Music	Result
Ray & Camilla	29 (7, 6, 8, 8)	Tango	"Money, Money, Money" — ABBA	Safe
Carol & Matthew	27 (6, 7, 7, 7)	Jive	"Hanky Panky" — Madonna	Safe
Matt & Lilia	30 (8, 7, 7, 8)	Tango	"Stand by Me" — Ben E. King	Safe
Georgina & James	18 (3, 3, 6, 6)	Jive	"Burning Love" — Elvis Presley	Bottom two
DJ Spoony & Ola	27 (6, 7, 7, 7)	Tango	"Tango D'Amour" — Vicky Leandros	Eliminated
Claire & Brendan	22 (4, 6, 6, 6)	Jive	"Nutbush City Limits" — Ike & Tina Turner	Safe
Jan & Anton	18 (3, 4, 6, 5)	Jive	"Do You Wanna Dance" — Cliff Richard	Safe
Mark & Karen	32 (7, 8, 8, 9)	Tango	"Eleanor Rigby" — The Beatles	Safe
Emma & Darren	33 (8, 8, 8, 9)	Jive	"The Edge of Heaven" — Wham!	Safe
Peter & Erin	31 (6, 8, 9, 8)	Tango	"Tango Notturno" — Tango Ballroom Orchestra Alfred Hause	Safe
Louisa & Vincent	36 (8, 9, 9, 10)	Jive	"Smiley Faces" — Gnarls Barkley	Safe

=== Week 4 ===
Couples performed either the foxtrot or the paso doble, and are listed in the order they performed.

Couple	Scores	Dance	Music	Result
Emma & Darren	30 (8, 7, 7, 8)	Foxtrot	"One" — from A Chorus Line	Safe
Matt & Lilia	28 (7, 7, 7, 7)	Paso doble	"I'd Do Anything for Love (But I Won't Do That)" — Meat Loaf	Safe
Jan & Anton	24 (5, 5, 7, 7)	Foxtrot	"Night and Day" — Ella Fitzgerald	Bottom two
Mark & Karen	35 (8, 9, 9, 9)	Paso doble	"Scott & Fran's Paso Doble" — from Strictly Ballroom	Safe
Carol & Matthew	29 (6, 7, 8, 8)	Foxtrot	"Stuck on You" — Lionel Richie	Safe
Georgina & James	26 (5, 6, 8, 7)	Foxtrot	"Have You Met Miss Jones?" — Robbie Williams	Eliminated
Peter & Erin	19 (2, 5, 6, 6)	Paso doble	"Mission: Impossible Theme" — from Mission: Impossible	Safe
Louisa & Vincent	26 (7, 5, 6, 8)	Foxtrot	"Piece of My Heart" — Erma Franklin	Safe
Ray & Camilla	30 (7, 8, 7, 8)	Paso doble	"It's My Life" — Bon Jovi	Safe
Claire & Brendan	24 (7, 4, 6, 7)	Foxtrot	"Sweet Caroline" — Neil Diamond	Safe

=== Week 5 ===
Couples performed either the salsa or the Viennese waltz, and are listed in the order they performed.

Couple	Scores	Dance	Music	Result
Louisa & Vincent	29 (6, 8, 7, 8)	Salsa	"Bailamos" — Enrique Iglesias	Safe
Jan & Anton	25 (5, 6, 7, 7)	Viennese waltz	"Iris" — The Goo Goo Dolls	Eliminated
Matt & Lilia	25 (5, 6, 7, 7)	Salsa	"Perfect Love" — Simply Red	Safe
Ray & Camilla	35 (8, 9, 9, 9)	Viennese waltz	"I'll Make Love To You" — Boyz II Men	Safe
Claire & Brendan	21 (4, 5, 6, 6)	Salsa	"Senorita" — Justin Timberlake	Bottom two
Emma & Darren	34 (8, 9, 8, 9)	Viennese waltz	"Kiss From A Rose" — Seal	Safe
Carol & Matthew	29 (7, 6, 8, 8)	Salsa	"Don't Stop 'Til You Get Enough" — Michael Jackson	Safe
Peter & Erin	28 (6, 7, 8, 7)	Viennese waltz	"Have You Ever Really Loved a Woman?" — Bryan Adams	Safe
Mark & Karen	36 (9, 9, 9, 9)	Salsa	"Hot, Hot, Hot" — Arrow	Safe

=== Week 6 ===
Couples performed either the American Smooth or the samba, and are listed in the order they performed.

Couple	Scores	Dance	Music	Result
Ray & Camilla	26 (6, 6, 7, 7)	Samba	"I Don't Feel Like Dancin'" — Scissor Sisters	Eliminated
Claire & Brendan	32 (8, 7, 9, 8)	American Smooth	"Blue Moon" — Frank Sinatra	Bottom two
Emma & Darren	36 (9, 9, 9, 9)	Samba	"María" — Ricky Martin	Safe
Mark & Karen	33 (8, 9, 7, 9)	American Smooth	"Orange Colored Sky" — Nat King Cole	Safe
Louisa & Vincent	32 (8, 8, 8, 8)	Samba	"Rhythm of the Night" — DeBarge	Safe
Matt & Lilia	34 (8, 8, 9, 9)	American Smooth	"You Make Me Feel So Young" — Frank Sinatra	Safe
Peter & Erin	19 (3, 4, 6, 6)	Samba	"Use It Up and Wear It Out" — Odyssey	Safe
Carol & Matthew	27 (6, 7, 7, 7)	American Smooth	"It's Oh So Quiet" — Björk	Safe

=== Week 7 ===
Couples are listed in the order they performed.

Couple	Scores	Dance	Music	Result
Emma & Darren	30 (7, 7, 7, 9)	Cha-cha-cha	"All Right Now" — Free	Bottom two
Claire & Brendan	29 (8, 8, 6, 7)	Tango	"Ole Guapa" — André Rieu	Safe
Mark & Karen	27 (5, 6, 8, 8)	Rumba	"Right Here Waiting" — Richard Marx	Safe
Carol & Matthew	30 (7, 7, 8, 8)	Cha-cha-cha	"Dancing in the Moonlight" — Toploader	Safe
Peter & Erin	26 (6, 6, 7, 7)	Foxtrot	"Something's Gotta Give" — Sammy Davis, Jr.	Eliminated
Louisa & Vincent	35 (8, 9, 9, 9)	Tango	"Sweet Dreams (Are Made of This)" — Eurythmics	Safe
Matt & Lilia	37 (9, 9, 10, 9)	Waltz	"What a Wonderful World" — Louis Armstrong	Safe

=== Week 8 ===
Couples are listed in the order they performed.

Couple	Scores	Dance	Music	Result
Matt & Lilia	28 (6, 7, 8, 7)	Jive	"I Got You (I Feel Good)" — James Brown	Safe
Carol & Matthew	30 (7, 7, 8, 8)	Waltz	"If You Don't Know Me by Now" — Simply Red	Bottom two
Louisa & Vincent	34 (8, 8, 9, 9)	Paso doble	"Left Outside Alone" — Anastacia	Safe
Emma & Darren	34 (8, 8, 9, 9)	American Smooth	"Anything Goes" — Cole Porter	Safe
Claire & Brendan	25 (5, 5, 8, 7)	Samba	"I Love to Love" — Tina Charles	Eliminated
Mark & Karen	36 (9, 9, 9, 9)	Viennese waltz	"Piano Man" — Billy Joel	Safe

=== Week 9 ===
Each couple performed two routines, and are listed in the order they performed.

Couple	Scores	Dance	Music	Result
Carol & Matthew	34 (8, 8, 9, 9)	Viennese waltz	"Breakaway" — Kelly Clarkson	Eliminated
Carol & Matthew	34 (7, 9, 9, 9)	Samba	"Club Tropicana" — Wham!	Eliminated
Matt & Lilia	34 (8, 8, 9, 9)	Quickstep	"Walking on Sunshine" — Katrina and the Waves	Safe
Matt & Lilia	27 (6, 6, 8, 7)	Rumba	"The Blower's Daughter" — Damien Rice	Safe
Emma & Darren	37 (9, 8, 10, 10)	Waltz	"The Way We Were" — Barbra Streisand	Bottom two
Emma & Darren	37 (9, 9, 9, 10)	Paso doble	"Explosive" — Bond	Bottom two
Mark & Karen	28 (7, 7, 7, 7)	Foxtrot	"California Dreamin'" — The Mamas & the Papas	Safe
Mark & Karen	36 (9, 9, 9, 9)	Samba	"I Go to Rio" — Peter Allen	Safe
Louisa & Vincent	33 (8, 8, 8, 9)	Viennese waltz	"That's Amore" — Dean Martin	Safe
Louisa & Vincent	36 (9, 9, 9, 9)	Cha-cha-cha	"Rescue Me" — Fontella Bass	Safe

=== Week 10: Quarterfinal ===
Each couple performed two routines, and are listed in the order they performed.

Couple	Scores	Dance	Music	Result
Mark & Karen	36 (9, 9, 9, 9)	Waltz	"With You I'm Born Again" — Billy Preston	Safe
Mark & Karen	27 (5, 7, 8, 7)	Jive	"Blue Suede Shoes" — Elvis Presley	Safe
Louisa & Vincent	31 (7, 8, 8, 8)	American Smooth	"Do Nothing till You Hear from Me" — Robbie Williams	Eliminated
Louisa & Vincent	28 (7, 7, 7, 7)	Rumba	"Everything I Do (I Do It For You)" — Bryan Adams	Eliminated
Matt & Lilia	29 (6, 7, 8, 8)	Viennese waltz	"Crazy" — Aerosmith	Safe
Matt & Lilia	32 (8, 8, 8, 8)	Samba	"Faith" — George Michael	Safe
Emma & Darren	35 (9, 8, 9, 9)	Tango	"Maneater" — Nelly Furtado	Bottom two
Emma & Darren	34 (8, 8, 9, 9)	Rumba	"She's the One" — Robbie Williams	Bottom two

=== Week 11: Semifinal ===
Each couple performed two routines, one of which was the Argentine tango, and are listed in the order they performed.

Couple	Scores	Dance	Music	Result
Matt & Lilia	35 (9, 8, 9, 9)	Foxtrot	"Moondance" — Van Morrison	Safe
Matt & Lilia	30 (7, 7, 8, 8)	Argentine tango	"I've Seen That Face Before (Libertango)" — Grace Jones	Safe
Emma & Darren	36 (9, 9, 9, 9)	Argentine tango	"Santa Maria" — Gotan Project	Eliminated
Emma & Darren	33 (8, 7, 9, 9)	Salsa	"Ain't Nobody" — Chaka Khan	Eliminated
Mark & Karen	34 (9, 9, 8, 8)	Quickstep	"Bye Bye Love" — The Everly Brothers	Safe
Mark & Karen	39 (9, 10, 10, 10)	Argentine tango	"GoldenEye" — Tina Turner	Safe

=== Week 12: Final ===
Each couple performed three routines: their favourite ballroom dance, their favourite Latin dance, one dance performed to the same song, and their showdance routine. Couples are listed in the order they performed.

Couple	Scores	Dance	Music	Result
Matt & Lilia	38 (9, 9, 10, 10)	Waltz	"What a Wonderful World" — Louis Armstrong	Runners-up
Matt & Lilia	31 (7, 7, 9, 8)	Samba	"Faith" — George Michael	Runners-up
Matt & Lilia	36 (9, 9, 9, 9)	Quickstep	"(Your Love Keeps Lifting Me) Higher and Higher" — Jackie Wilson	Runners-up
Matt & Lilia	No scores received	Showdance	"I Say a Little Prayer" — Aretha Franklin	Runners-up
Mark & Karen	34 (8, 8, 9, 9)	Tango	"Eleanor Rigby" — The Beatles	Winners
Mark & Karen	40 (10, 10, 10, 10)	Salsa	"Hot Hot Hot" — Arrow	Winners
Mark & Karen	36 (9, 9, 9, 9)	Samba	"(Your Love Keeps Lifting Me) Higher and Higher" — Jackie Wilson	Winners
Mark & Karen	No scores received	Showdance	"Shout" — Lulu	Winners

== Dance chart ==
The couples performed the following each week:

- Week 1: One unlearned dance (cha-cha-cha or waltz); group mambo
- Week 2: One unlearned dance (quickstep or rumba); group swing dance
- Week 3: One unlearned dance (jive or tango)
- Week 4: One unlearned dance (foxtrot or paso doble)
- Week 5: One unlearned dance (salsa or Viennese waltz)
- Week 6: One unlearned dance (American Smooth or samba)
- Weeks 7–8: One unlearned dance
- Week 9: Two unlearned dances
- Week 10 (Quarterfinal): Two unlearned dances
- Week 11 (Semifinal): One unlearned dance & Argentine tango
- Week 12 (Final): Favourite ballroom dance, favourite Latin dance, one new dance & showdance

Strictly Come Dancing (series 4) - Dance chart
Couple	Week																	
Couple	1	2	3	4	5	6	7	8	9		10		11		12			
Mark & Karen	Cha-cha-cha	Group; Swing	Tango	Paso doble	Salsa	American Smooth	Rumba	Viennese waltz	Foxtrot	Samba	Waltz	Jive	Quickstep	Argentine tango	Tango	Salsa	Samba	Showdance
Matt & Lilia	Cha-cha-cha	Group; Swing	Tango	Paso doble	Salsa	American Smooth	Waltz	Jive	Quickstep	Rumba	Viennese waltz	Samba	Foxtrot	Argentine tango	Waltz	Samba	Quickstep	Showdance
Emma & Darren	Group; Mambo	Quickstep	Jive	Foxtrot	Viennese waltz	Samba	Cha-cha-cha	American Smooth	Waltz	Paso doble	Tango	Rumba	Argentine tango	Salsa				
Louisa & Vincent	Group; Mambo	Quickstep	Jive	Foxtrot	Salsa	Samba	Tango	Paso doble	Viennese waltz	Cha-cha-cha	American Smooth	Rumba						
Carol & Matthew	Group; Mambo	Quickstep	Jive	Foxtrot	Salsa	American Smooth	Cha-cha-cha	Waltz	Viennese waltz	Samba								
Claire & Brendan	Group; Mambo	Rumba	Jive	Foxtrot	Salsa	American Smooth	Tango	Samba										
Peter & Erin	Waltz	Group; Swing	Tango	Paso doble	Viennese waltz	Samba	Foxtrot											
Ray & Camilla	Cha-cha-cha	Group; Swing	Tango	Paso doble	Viennese waltz	Samba												
Jan & Anton	Group; Mambo	Quickstep	Jive	Foxtrot	Viennese waltz													
Georgina & James	Group; Mambo	Rumba	Jive	Foxtrot														
DJ Spoony & Ola	Cha-cha-cha	Group; Swing	Tango															
Mica & Ian	Group; Mambo	Rumba																
Jimmy & Flavia	Waltz																	
Nicholas & Nicole	Waltz																	

== Ratings ==
Weekly ratings for each show on BBC One. All ratings are provided by BARB.

Episode	Date	Official rating (millions)	Weekly rank for BBC One	Weekly rank for all UK TV
Week 1	7 October	9.23	2	7
Week 1 results	7 October	7.62	6	16
Week 2	14 October	6.71	9	24
Week 2 results	14 October	6.78	8	23
Week 3	21 October	7.18	6	21
Week 3 results	21 October	7.85	5	16
Week 4	28 October	7.73	6	17
Week 4 results	28 October	7.91	5	14
Week 5	4 November	8.48	5	14
Week 5 results	4 November	7.94	6	18
Week 6	11 November	9.30	3	10
Week 7	18 November	9.66	2	5
Week 7 results	18 November	7.73	5	21
Week 8	25 November	9.20	4	11
Week 8 results	25 November	7.44	6	25
Week 9	2 December	8.85	4	14
Week 9 results	2 December	7.92	5	22
Week 10	9 December	9.24	4	9
Week 10 results	9 December	10.33	1	3
Week 11	16 December	9.45	3	10
Week 11 results	16 December	7.42	9	22
Week 12	23 December	10.64	2	5
Week 12 results	23 December	12.11	1	1
Series average	2006	8.55	—N/a	—N/a
