= Strictly Come Dancing series 3 =

2005 British TV show

Strictly Come Dancing
- Series 3
- Presented by: Bruce Forsyth; Tess Daly
- Judges: Len Goodman; Arlene Phillips; Craig Revel Horwood; Bruno Tonioli
- Celebrity winner: Darren Gough
- Professional winner: Lilia Kopylova
- No. of episodes: 20

Release
- Original network: BBC One
- Original release: 15 October – 17 December 2005

Series chronology
- ← Previous; Series 2 Next → Series 4

Strictly Come Dancing returned for its third series on 15 October 2005. Bruce Forsyth and Tess Daly returned to co-present the main show on BBC One, while Claudia Winkleman returned to present the spin-off show, Strictly Come Dancing: It Takes Two. Len Goodman, Arlene Phillips, Craig Revel Horwood, and Bruno Tonioli returned as judges.

England cricketer Darren Gough and Lilia Kopylova were announced as the winners on 17 December, while Olympic hurdler Colin Jackson and Erin Boag finished in second place, and television presenter Zoe Ball and Ian Waite finished in third.

== Format ==
Hosts and Judges for Strictly Come Dancing (Series 3)

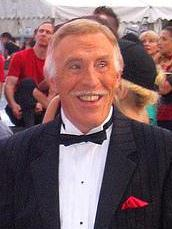
Bruce Forsyth

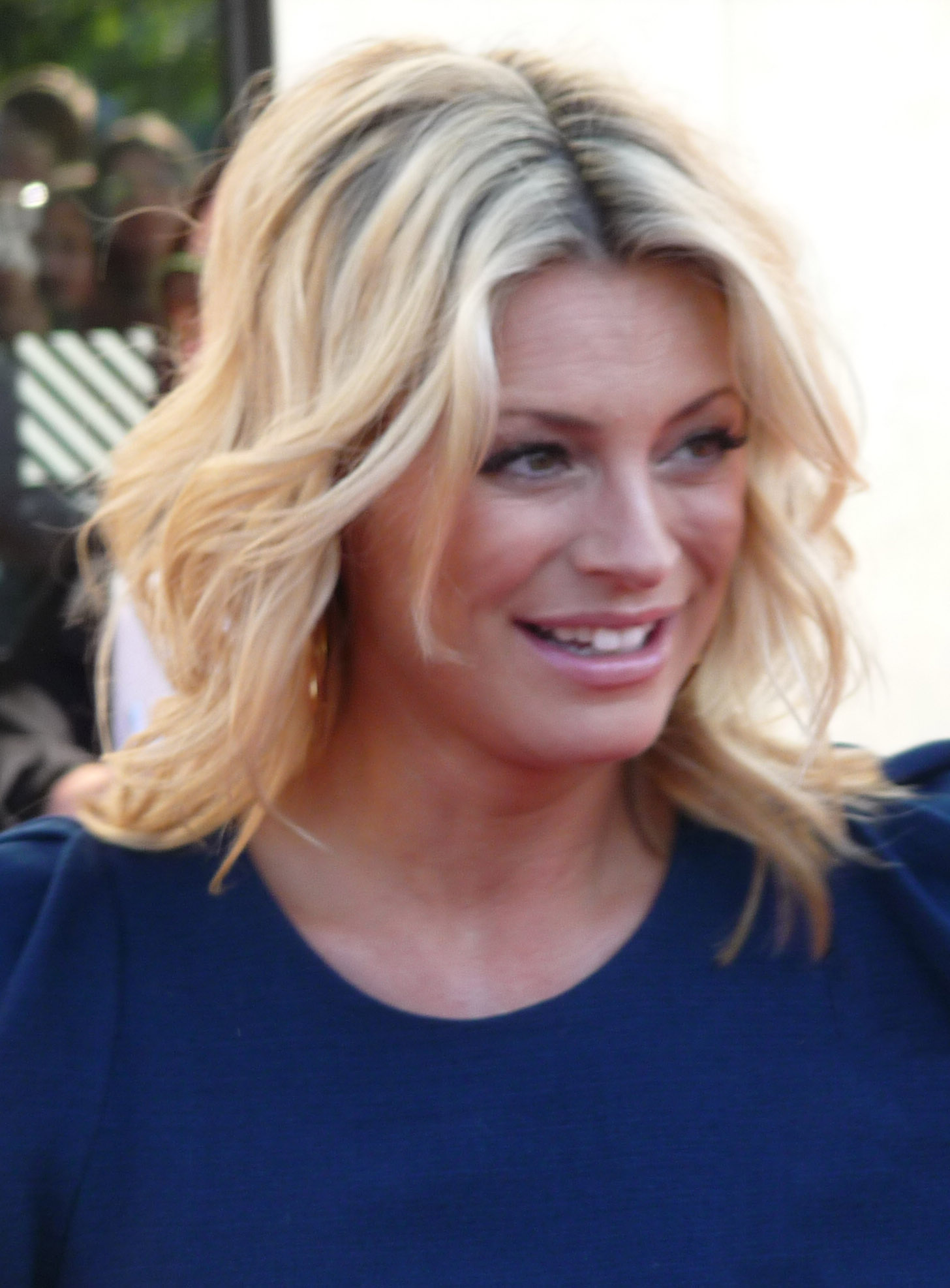
Tess Daly

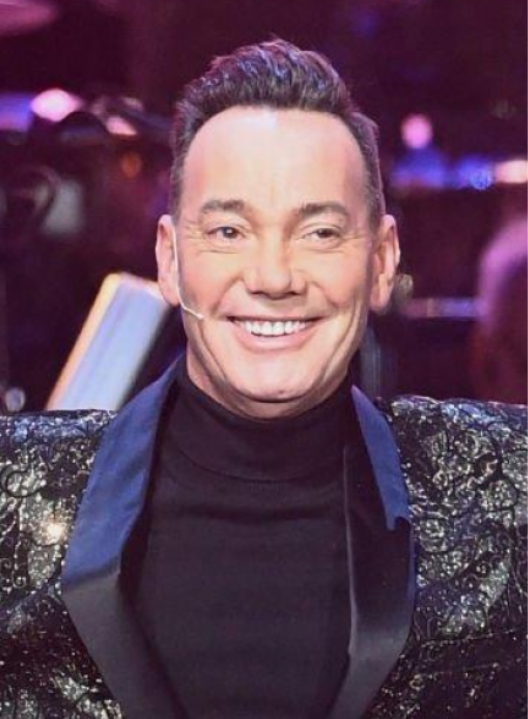
Craig Revel Horwood

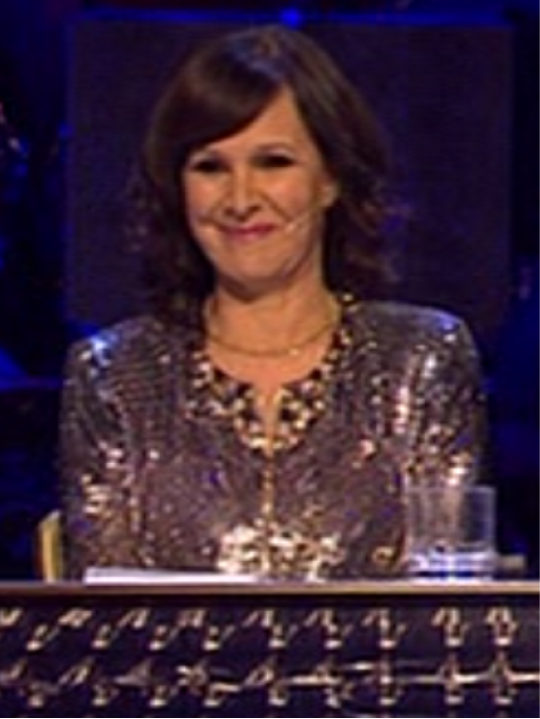
Arlene Phillips

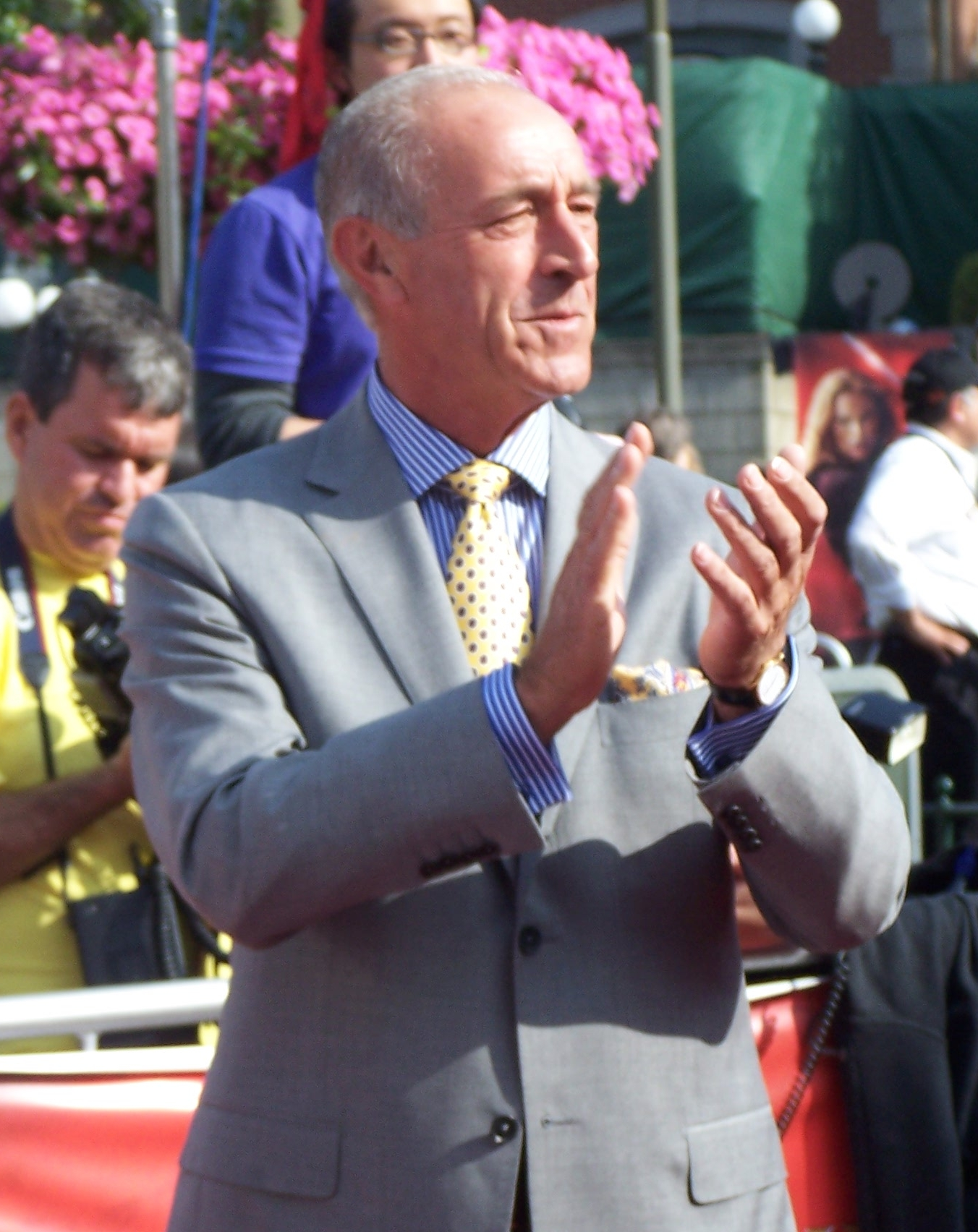
Len Goodman

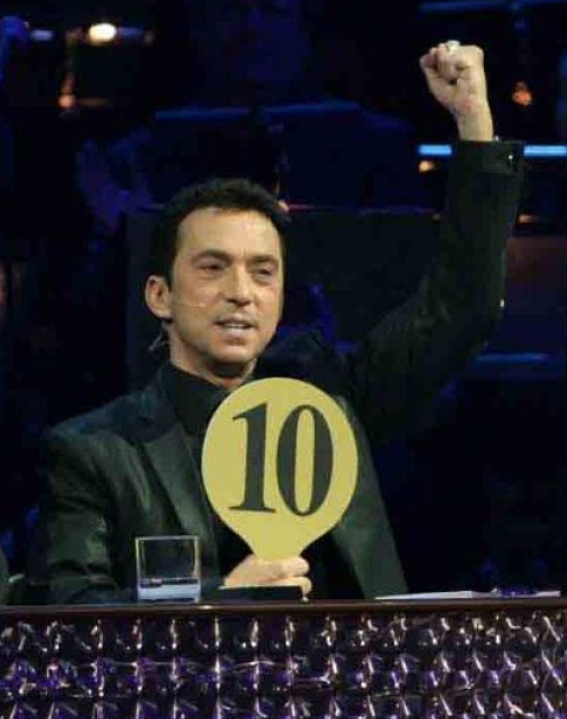
Bruno Tonioli

The couples dance each week in a live show. The judges score each performance out of ten. The couples are then ranked according to the judges' scores and given points according to their rank, with the lowest scored couple receiving one point, and the highest scored couple receiving the most points (the maximum number of points available depends on the number of couples remaining in the competition).

The public are also invited to vote for their favourite couples, and the couples are ranked again according to the number of votes they receive, again receiving points; the couple with the fewest votes receiving one point, and the couple with the most votes receiving the most points.

The points for judges' score and public vote are then added together, and the two couples with the fewest points are placed in the bottom two. If two couples have equal points, the points from the public vote are given precedence.

== Couples ==
This series featured twelve celebrity contestants.

Celebrity	Notability	Professional partner	Status
Siobhan Hayes	My Family actress	Matthew Cutler	Eliminated 1st on 15 October 2005
Jaye Jacobs	Holby City actress	Andrew Cuerden	Eliminated 2nd on 22 October 2005
Gloria Hunniford	Television & radio presenter	Darren Bennett	Eliminated 3rd on 29 October 2005
Fiona Phillips	GMTV presenter	Brendan Cole	Eliminated 4th on 5 November 2005
Dennis Taylor	Snooker player	Izabela Hannah	Eliminated 5th on 12 November 2005
Will Thorp	Casualty actor	Hanna Haarala	Eliminated 6th on 19 November 2005
Bill Turnbull	BBC Breakfast presenter & journalist	Karen Hardy	Eliminated 7th on 26 November 2005
Patsy Palmer	EastEnders actress	Anton Du Beke	Eliminated 8th on 3 December 2005
James Martin	Chef & television presenter	Camilla Dallerup	Eliminated 9th on 10 December 2005
Zoe Ball	Television & radio presenter	Ian Waite	Third place on 17 December 2005
Colin Jackson	Olympic hurdler	Erin Boag	Runners-up on 17 December 2005
Darren Gough	England cricketer	Lilia Kopylova	Winners on 17 December 2005

== Scoring chart ==
The highest score each week is indicated in bold green with a dagger (†), while the lowest score each week is indicated in italicized red with a double-dagger (‡).

Color key:

Winners
Runners-up
Third place
Bottom two
Eliminated

Strictly Come Dancing (series 3) - Weekly scores
Couple	Pl.	Week									
Couple	Pl.	1	2	3	4	5	6	7	8	9	10
Darren & Lilia	1st	19	30	33	34	28	30	34	30+32=62	35+29=64	
Colin & Erin	2nd	32	**36**†	26	31	32	32	34	36+37=**73**†	37+30=67	
Zoe & Ian	3rd	**35**†	32	29	**36**†	**35**†	**36**†	**38**†	32+36=68 (Note: This couple was in the bottom two, but was not eliminated.)	36+33=**69**†	
James & Camilla	4th	22	29	28	29	29	20	32	20+28=48‡	33+22=55‡ (Note: This couple was eliminated.)	
Patsy & Anton	5th	19	26	**34**†	31	26	31	24‡	27+31=58		
Bill & Karen	6th	29	23	20	25	27	17‡	25			
Will & Hanna	7th	18	29	25	34	23‡	28				
Dennis & Izabela	8th	20	18	22	15‡	23‡					
Fiona & Brendan	9th	11‡	13‡	16‡	20						
Gloria & Darren	10th	22	17	19							
Jaye & Andrew	11th	25	21								
Siobhan & Matthew	12th	15									

=== Average chart ===
This table only counts for dances scored on a traditional 40-point scale.

Couple	Rank by average	Total points	Number of dances	Total average
Zoe & Ian	1st	454	13	34.9
Colin & Erin	2nd	438	13	33.7
Darren & Lilia	3rd	406	13	31.2
Patsy & Anton	4th	249	9	27.7
James & Camilla	5th	292	11	26.5
Will & Hanna	6th	157	6	26.2
Bill & Karen	7th	166	7	23.7
Jaye & Andrew	8th	46	2	23.0
Dennis & Izabela	9th	98	5	19.6
Gloria & Darren	10th	58	3	19.3
Fiona & Brendan	11th	60	4	15.0
Siobhan & Matthew	11th	15	1	15.0

== Weekly scores ==
Unless indicated otherwise, individual judges scores in the charts below (given in parentheses) are listed in this order from left to right: Craig Revel Horwood, Arlene Phillips, Len Goodman, Bruno Tonioli.

=== Week 1 ===
Musical guest: Simply Red — "Perfect Love"

Couples performed either the cha-cha-cha or the waltz, and are listed in the order they performed.

Couple	Scores	Dance	Music	Result
Darren & Lilia	19 (3, 4, 6, 6)	Cha-cha-cha	"Hot Stuff" — Donna Summer	Safe
Patsy & Anton	19 (3, 4, 6, 6)	Waltz	"Fly Me to the Moon" — Frank Sinatra	Safe
Colin & Erin	32 (8, 8, 8, 8)	Cha-cha-cha	"Save the Last Dance for Me" — Michael Bublé	Safe
Siobhan & Matthew	15 (2, 4, 5, 4)	Waltz	"When the Girl in Your Arms Is the Girl in Your Heart" — Cliff Richard	Eliminated
James & Camilla	22 (4, 5, 6, 7)	Cha-cha-cha	"Something Got Me Started" — Simply Red	Safe
Gloria & Darren	22 (4, 5, 7, 6)	Waltz	"Lady" — Kenny Rogers	Safe
Will & Hanna	18 (3, 3, 7, 5)	Cha-cha-cha	"Crazy Chick" — Charlotte Church	Bottom two
Jaye & Andrew	25 (6, 5, 7, 7)	Waltz	"When I Need You" — Leo Sayer	Safe
Bill & Karen	29 (7, 7, 8, 7)	Cha-cha-cha	"Love Potion No. 9" — The Coasters	Safe
Fiona & Brendan	11 (2, 2, 4, 3)	Waltz	"Sam" — Olivia Newton-John	Safe
Dennis & Izabela	20 (5, 5, 5, 5)	Cha-cha-cha	"Music" — Madonna	Safe
Zoe & Ian	35 (8, 9, 9, 9)	Waltz	"Take It to the Limit" — Eagles	Safe

=== Week 2 ===
Musical guest: Westlife — "You Raise Me Up"

Couples performed either the quickstep or the rumba, and are listed in the order they performed.

Couple	Scores	Dance	Music	Result
James & Camilla	29 (6, 7, 8, 8)	Quickstep	"Luck Be A Lady" — Frank Sinatra	Safe
Jaye & Andrew	21 (4, 4, 7, 6)	Rumba	"How Could an Angel Break My Heart" — Kenny G, feat. Toni Braxton	Eliminated
Dennis & Izabela	18 (4, 5, 5, 4)	Quickstep	"I'm So Excited" — The Pointer Sisters	Safe
Patsy & Anton	26 (6, 6, 7, 7)	Rumba	"She" — Elvis Costello	Safe
Darren & Lilia	30 (7, 7, 8, 8)	Quickstep	"Let Me Entertain You" — Robbie Williams	Safe
Zoe & Ian	32 (7, 8, 8, 9)	Rumba	"One Moment in Time" — Whitney Houston	Safe
Will & Hanna	29 (7, 7, 8, 7)	Quickstep	"You Can't Hurry Love" — Phil Collins	Safe
Gloria & Darren	17 (2, 4, 5, 6)	Rumba	"Holding Back the Years" — Simply Red	Bottom two
Bill & Karen	23 (5, 6, 6, 6)	Quickstep	"Do Your Thing" — Basement Jaxx	Safe
Fiona & Brendan	13 (1, 2, 6, 4)	Rumba	"Almost Here" — Brian McFadden, feat. Delta Goodrem	Safe
Colin & Erin	36 (9, 9, 9, 9)	Quickstep	"Nice Work If You Can Get It" — Bing Crosby	Safe

=== Week 3 ===
Musical guest: Michael Bublé — "Save the Last Dance for Me"

Couples performed either the jive or the tango, and are listed in the order they performed.

Couple	Scores	Dance	Music	Result
Zoe & Ian	29 (7, 6, 8, 8)	Jive	"Part Time Lover" — Stevie Wonder	Safe
Bill & Karen	20 (4, 5, 6, 5)	Tango	"Perhaps, Perhaps, Perhaps" — Doris Day	Safe
Dennis & Izabela	22 (4, 6, 6, 6)	Jive	"Jailhouse Rock" — Elvis Presley	Safe
Patsy & Anton	34 (8, 8, 9, 9)	Tango	"Una Musica Brutal" — Gotan Project	Safe
Will & Hanna	25 (6, 5, 7, 7)	Jive	"Man! I Feel Like a Woman!" — Shania Twain	Bottom two
Colin & Erin	26 (7, 5, 7, 7)	Tango	"Ride It" — Geri Halliwell	Safe
Gloria & Darren	19 (3, 4, 6, 6)	Jive	"Build Me Up Buttercup" — The Foundations	Eliminated
James & Camilla	28 (6, 7, 8, 7)	Tango	"Mein Herr" — Liza Minnelli	Safe
Fiona & Brendan	16 (2, 4, 5, 5)	Jive	"Hit the Road Jack" — Ray Charles	Safe
Darren & Lilia	33 (8, 9, 8, 8)	Tango	"From Russia with Love" — Matt Monro	Safe

=== Week 4 ===
Musical guest: Katie Melua — "Just Like Heaven"

Couples performed either the foxtrot or the paso doble, and are listed in the order they performed.

Couple	Scores	Dance	Music	Result
Colin & Erin	31 (8, 7, 8, 8)	Paso doble	"Thriller" — Michael Jackson	Safe
Zoe & Ian	36 (9, 9, 9, 9)	Foxtrot	"Isn't She Lovely" — Stevie Wonder	Safe
Dennis & Izabela	15 (2, 3, 5, 5)	Paso doble	"Eye of the Tiger" — Survivor	Bottom two
Will & Hanna	34 (8, 8, 9, 9)	Foxtrot	"Dream a Little Dream of Me" — The Beautiful South	Safe
James & Camilla	29 (7, 8, 7, 7)	Paso doble	"Romeo and Juliet" — Royal Philharmonic Orchestra	Safe
Fiona & Brendan	20 (3, 5, 6, 6)	Foxtrot	"Ain't That a Kick in the Head?" — Robbie Williams	Eliminated
Bill & Karen	25 (5, 6, 7, 7)	Paso doble	"Carnaval de Paris" — Dario G	Safe
Patsy & Anton	31 (7, 8, 8, 8)	Foxtrot	"You're Nobody till Somebody Loves You" — Dean Martin	Safe
Darren & Lilia	34 (8, 9, 9, 8)	Paso doble	"Don't Let Me Be Misunderstood" — The Animals	Safe

=== Week 5 ===
Musical guests: Beverley Knight & Jools Holland — "Where in the World"

Couples performed either the samba or the Viennese waltz, and are listed in the order they performed.

Couple	Scores	Dance	Music	Result
Darren & Lilia	28 (6, 7, 8, 7)	Viennese waltz	"End of the Road" — Boyz II Men	Safe
Dennis & Izabela	23 (5, 5, 6, 7)	Samba	"La Bamba" — Los Lobos	Eliminated
Will & Hanna	23 (4, 6, 6, 7)	Viennese waltz	"Somebody to Love" — Queen	Bottom two
Colin & Erin	32 (8, 8, 8, 8)	Samba	"Naughty Girl" — Beyoncé	Safe
Bill & Karen	27 (6, 7, 7, 7)	Viennese waltz	"Golden Brown" — The Stranglers	Safe
Patsy & Anton	26 (6, 6, 7, 7)	Samba	"Going Back to My Roots" — Odyssey	Safe
James & Camilla	29 (5, 8, 8, 8)	Viennese waltz	"Mr. Bojangles" — Neil Diamond	Safe
Zoe & Ian	35 (8, 9, 9, 9)	Samba	"Aquarius" — The Fifth Dimension	Safe

=== Week 6 ===
Musical guest: Will Young — "Happiness"

Couples are listed in the order they performed.

Couple	Scores	Dance	Music	Result
James & Camilla	20 (5, 4, 6, 5)	Jive	"Why Do Fools Fall in Love" — Diana Ross	Safe
Zoe & Ian	36 (8, 9, 9, 10)	Quickstep	"Almost Like Being in Love" — Nat King Cole	Safe
Bill & Karen	17 (2, 5, 6, 4)	Rumba	"Ain't No Sunshine" — Bill Withers	Safe
Will & Hanna	28 (6, 6, 9, 7)	Tango	"Pretty Woman" — Roy Orbison	Eliminated
Patsy & Anton	31 (7, 8, 8, 8)	Quickstep	"Lover Come Back to Me" — Barbra Streisand	Bottom two
Darren & Lilia	30 (7, 7, 8, 8)	Jive	"Everybody Needs Somebody to Love" — The Blues Brothers	Safe
Colin & Erin	32 (8, 8, 8, 8)	Foxtrot	"New York, New York" — Frank Sinatra	Safe

=== Week 7 ===
Musical guest: Pussycat Dolls — "Sway"

Couples are listed in the order they performed.

Couple	Scores	Dance	Music	Result
Bill & Karen	25 (6, 6, 7, 6)	Waltz	"What the World Needs Now Is Love" — Dionne Warwick	Eliminated
Patsy & Anton	24 (6, 4, 7, 7)	Cha-cha-cha	"A Little Less Conversation" — JXL	Bottom two
Colin & Erin	34 (9, 9, 8, 8)	Viennese waltz	"Stop!" — Sam Brown	Safe
Zoe & Ian	38 (9, 10, 9, 10)	Tango	"Tango Argentino" — Mario Battaini	Safe
Darren & Lilia	34 (8, 8, 9, 9)	Foxtrot	"Big Spender" — Shirley Bassey	Safe
James & Camilla	32 (7, 8, 9, 8)	Waltz	"Together Again" — Buck Owens	Safe

=== Week 8: Quarterfinal ===
Musical guest: Cliff Richard — "Do You Wanna Dance"

Each couple performed two routines, one of which was the American Smooth, and are listed in the order they performed.

Couple	Scores	Dance	Music	Result
Colin & Erin	36 (9, 9, 9, 9)	Rumba	"You're Beautiful" — James Blunt	Safe
Colin & Erin	37 (9, 10, 9, 9)	American Smooth	"Me and My Shadow" — Frank Sinatra & Sammy Davis, Jr.	Safe
James & Camilla	20 (4, 5, 6, 5)	Samba	"All Night Long" — Lionel Richie	Safe
James & Camilla	28 (7, 7, 7, 7)	American Smooth	"Call Me Irresponsible" — Michael Bublé	Safe
Patsy & Anton	27 (6, 6, 7, 8)	Jive	"Two Hearts" — Phil Collins	Eliminated
Patsy & Anton	31 (7, 8, 8, 8)	American Smooth	"It Had to Be You" — Harry Connick, Jr.	Eliminated
Darren & Lilia	30 (8, 7, 8, 7)	Rumba	"Beautiful" — Christina Aguilera	Safe
Darren & Lilia	32 (8, 8, 8, 8)	American Smooth	"I Get the Sweetest Feeling" — Jackie Wilson	Safe
Zoe & Ian	32 (8, 7, 8, 9)	Cha-cha-cha	"Ain't No Stoppin' Us Now" — Edwin Starr	Bottom two
Zoe & Ian	36 (9, 9, 9, 9)	American Smooth	"Passing Strangers" — Sarah Vaughan	Bottom two

=== Week 9: Semifinal ===
Musical guest: Sugababes — "Ugly"

Each couple performed two routines, and are listed in the order they performed.

Couple	Scores	Dance	Music	Result
Darren & Lilia	35 (9, 9, 9, 8)	Waltz	"Your Song" — Elton John	Safe
Darren & Lilia	29 (6, 7, 9, 7)	Samba	"You to Me Are Everything" — The Real Thing	Safe
Zoe & Ian	36 (9, 9, 9, 9)	Viennese waltz	"Always and Forever" — Heatwave	Bottom two
Zoe & Ian	33 (8, 8, 8, 9)	Paso doble	"Manolita" — Tito Schipa	Bottom two
James & Camilla	33 (8, 8, 9, 8)	Foxtrot	"Beyond the Sea" — Bobby Darin	Eliminated
James & Camilla	22 (4, 6, 7, 5)	Rumba	"Home" — Michael Bublé	Eliminated
Colin & Erin	37 (9, 9, 10, 9)	Waltz	"I Will Always Love You" — Whitney Houston	Safe
Colin & Erin	30 (7, 7, 8, 8)	Jive	"Footloose" — Kenny Loggins	Safe

=== Week 10: Final ===
Musical guest: Bruce Forsyth — "Let's Face the Music and Dance"

Each couple performed three routines: their favourite ballroom dance, their favourite Latin dance, and their showdance routine. Couples are listed in the order they performed.

Couple	Scores	Dance	Music	Result
Colin & Erin	39 (9, 10, 10, 10)	Quickstep	"Nice Work If You Can Get It" — Bing Crosby	Runners-up
Colin & Erin	36 (9, 9, 9, 9)	Rumba	"You're Beautiful" — James Blunt	Runners-up
Colin & Erin		Showdance	"You're Easy to Dance With" — Fred Astaire	Runners-up
Darren & Lilia	36 (8, 9, 10, 9)	Foxtrot	"Big Spender" — Shirley Bassey	Winners
Darren & Lilia	36 (9, 9, 9, 9)	Paso doble	"Don't Let Me Be Misunderstood" — The Animals	Winners
Darren & Lilia		Showdance	"A Night to Remember" — Shalamar	Winners
Zoe & Ian	38 (9, 10, 9, 10)	Tango	"Tango Argentino" — Mario Battaini	Third place
Zoe & Ian	38 (9, 9, 10, 10)	Samba	"Aquarius" — The Fifth Dimension	Third place
Zoe & Ian		Showdance	"America" — from West Side Story	Third place

== Dance chart ==
The couples performed the following each week:

- Week 1: One unlearned dance (cha-cha-cha or waltz)
- Week 2: One unlearned dance (quickstep or rumba)
- Week 3: One unlearned dance (jive or tango)
- Week 4: One unlearned dance (foxtrot or paso doble)
- Week 5: One unlearned dance (samba or Viennese waltz)
- Weeks 6–7: One unlearned dance
- Week 8 (Quarterfinal): One unlearned dance & American Smooth
- Week 9 (Semifinal): Two unlearned dances
- Week 10 (Final): Favourite ballroom dance, favourite Latin dance & showdance

Strictly Come Dancing (series 3) - Dance chart
Couple	Week													
Couple	1	2	3	4	5	6	7	8		9		10		
Darren & Lilia	Cha-cha-cha	Quickstep	Tango	Paso doble	Viennese waltz	Jive	Foxtrot	Rumba	American Smooth	Waltz	Samba	Foxtrot	Paso doble	Showdance
Colin & Erin	Cha-cha-cha	Quickstep	Tango	Paso doble	Samba	Foxtrot	Viennese waltz	Rumba	American Smooth	Waltz	Jive	Quickstep	Rumba	Showdance
Zoe & Ian	Waltz	Rumba	Jive	Foxtrot	Samba	Quickstep	Tango	Cha-cha-cha	American Smooth	Viennese waltz	Paso doble	Tango	Samba	Showdance
James & Camilla	Cha-cha-cha	Quickstep	Tango	Paso doble	Viennese waltz	Jive	Waltz	Samba	American Smooth	Foxtrot	Rumba			
Patsy & Anton	Waltz	Rumba	Tango	Foxtrot	Samba	Quickstep	Cha-cha-cha	Jive	American Smooth					
Bill & Karen	Cha-cha-cha	Quickstep	Tango	Paso doble	Viennese waltz	Rumba	Waltz							
Will & Hanna	Cha-cha-cha	Quickstep	Jive	Foxtrot	Viennese waltz	Tango								
Dennis & Izabela	Cha-cha-cha	Quickstep	Jive	Paso doble	Samba									
Fiona & Brendan	Waltz	Rumba	Jive	Foxtrot										
Gloria & Darren	Waltz	Rumba	Jive											
Jaye & Andrew	Waltz	Rumba												
Siobhan & Matthew	Waltz													

== Ratings ==
Weekly ratings for each show on BBC One. All ratings are provided by BARB.

Episode	Date	Official rating (millions)	Weekly rank for BBC One	Weekly rank for all UK TV
Week 1	15 October	7.23	9	24
Week 2	22 October	7.15	8	23
Week 2 results	22 October	7.07	9	25
Week 3	29 October	7.83	6	21
Week 3 results	29 October	7.03	9	25
Week 4	5 November	7.23	6	20
Week 4 results	5 November	6.98	8	22
Week 5	12 November	9.45	5	12
Week 6	19 November	9.10	6	17
Week 6 results	19 November	7.87	10	26
Week 7	26 November	9.44	4	13
Week 7 results	26 November	7.53	8	33
Week 8	3 December	9.68	4	14
Week 8 results	3 December	7.08	7	32
Week 9	10 December	9.61	5	12
Week 9 results	10 December	9.14	6	14
Week 10	17 December	10.76	1	3
Week 10 results	17 December	10.55	2	6
Series average	2005	8.37	—N/a	—N/a
