= Strictly Come Dancing series 5 =

Strictly Come Dancing
- Series 5
- Presented by: Bruce Forsyth; Tess Daly
- Judges: Len Goodman; Arlene Phillips; Craig Revel Horwood; Bruno Tonioli
- Celebrity winner: Alesha Dixon
- Professional winner: Matthew Cutler
- No. of episodes: 24

Release
- Original network: BBC One
- Original release: 6 October – 22 December 2007

Series chronology
- ← Previous; Series 4 Next → Series 6

Strictly Come Dancing returned for its fifth series on 29 September 2007 on BBC One. Bruce Forsyth and Tess Daly returned as co-presenters of the main show on BBC One, while Claudia Winkleman returned to present spin-off show Strictly Come Dancing: It Takes Two on BBC Two. Len Goodman, Arlene Phillips, Craig Revel Horwood, and Bruno Tonioli returned to the judging panel.

The first programme was a catch-up show and preview of the new series before the start of the competition on 6 October. In a change to the previous format, the results show aired on Sunday rather than later on Saturday.

Mis-Teeq singer Alesha Dixon and Matthew Cutler were announced as the winners on 22 December, while EastEnders actor Matt Di Angelo and Flavia Cacace finished in second place.

== Format ==
Hosts and Judges for Strictly Come Dancing (Series 5)

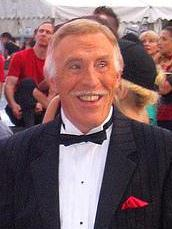
Bruce Forsyth

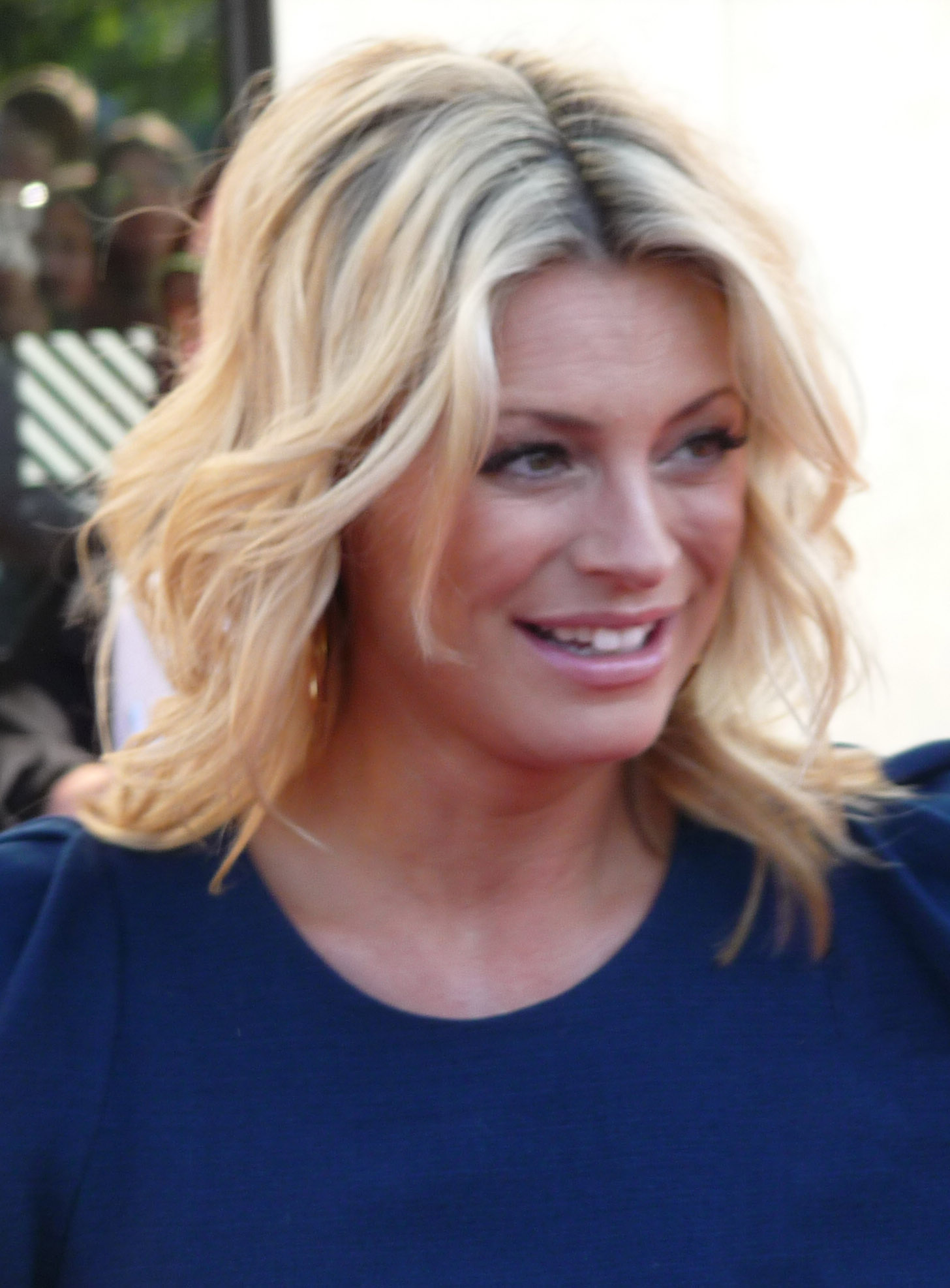
Tess Daly

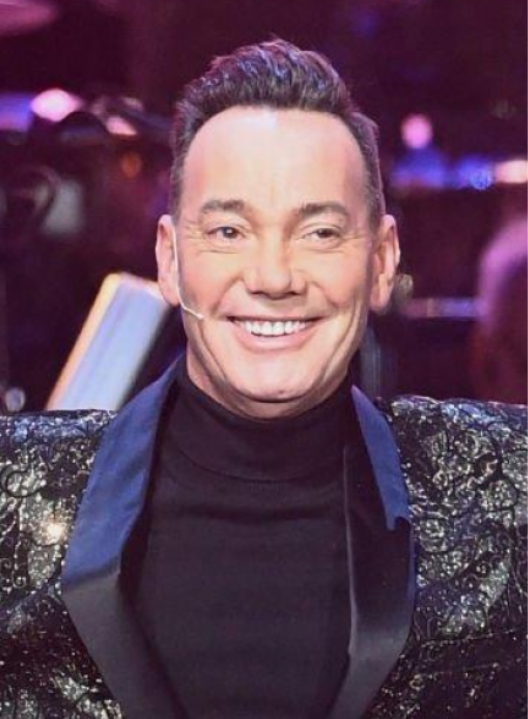
Craig Revel Horwood

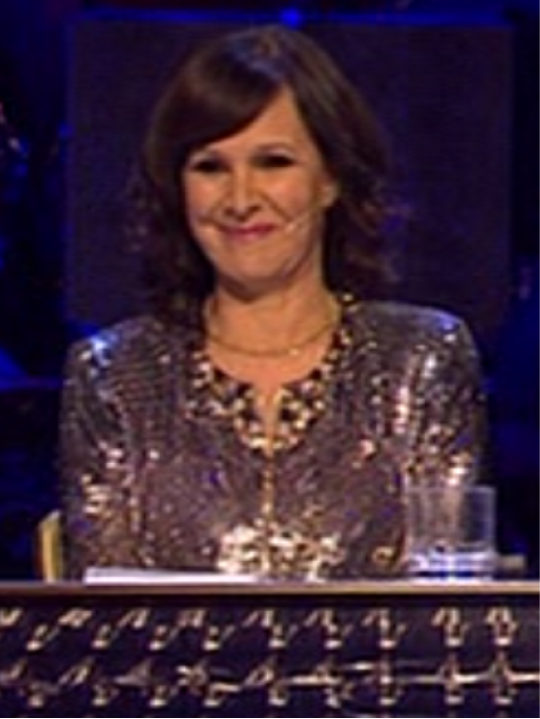
Arlene Phillips

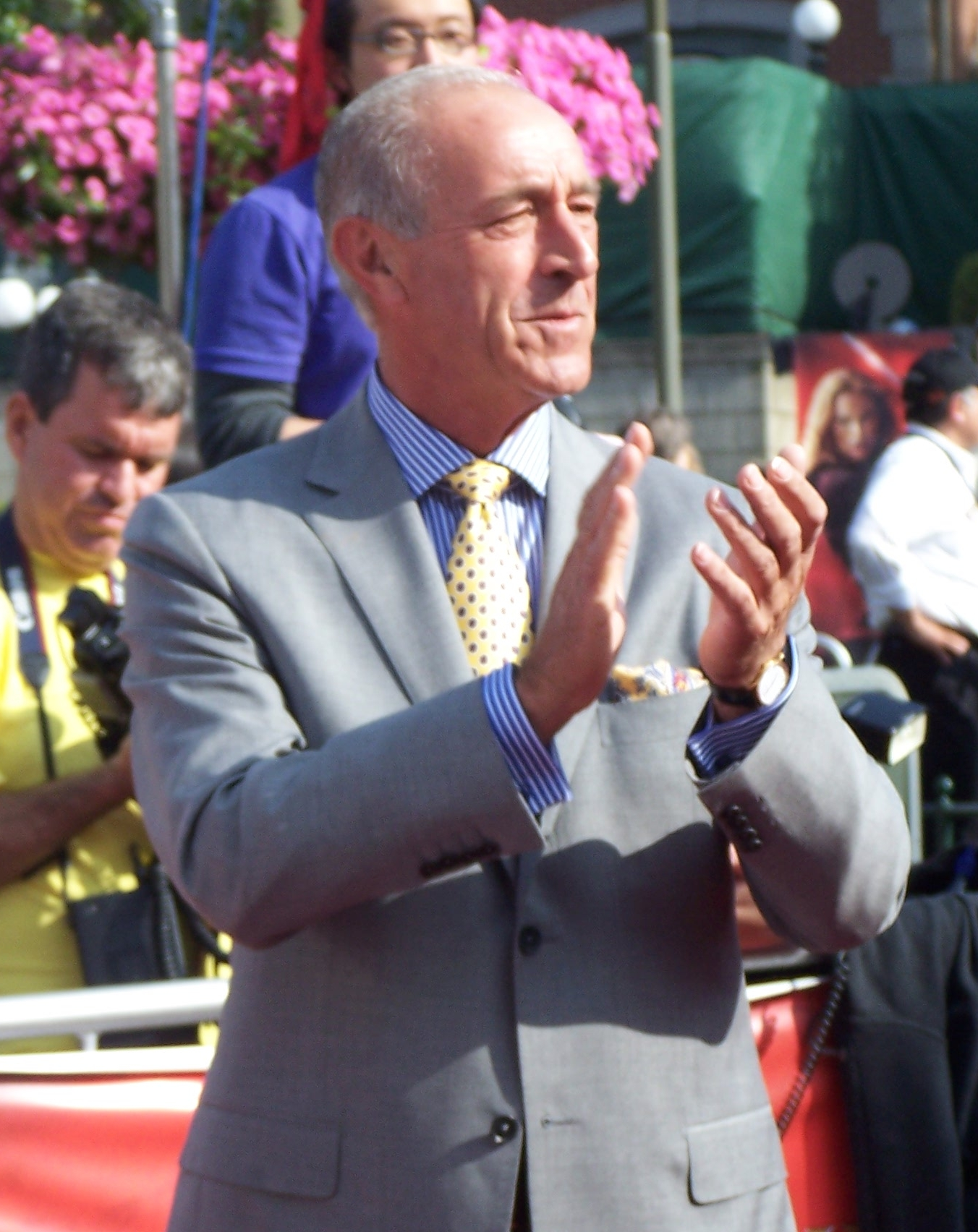
Len Goodman

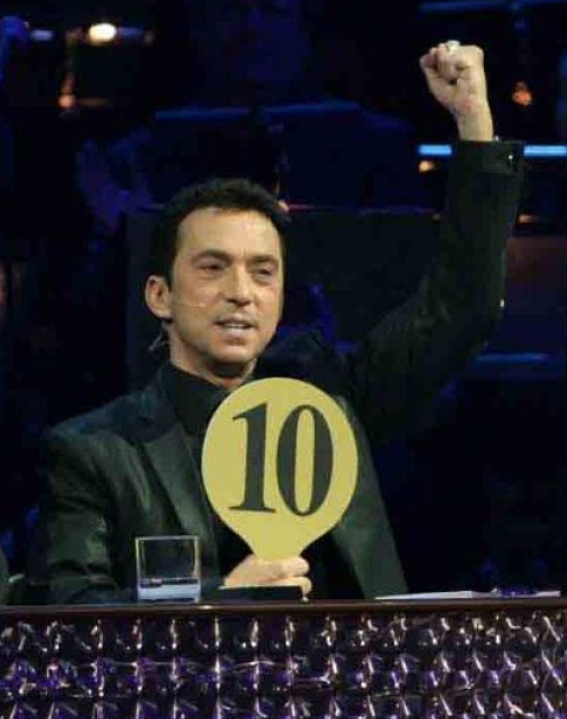
Bruno Tonioli

The couples dance each week in a live show. The judges score each performance out of ten. The couples are then ranked according to the judges' scores and given points according to their rank, with the lowest scored couple receiving one point, and the highest scored couple receiving the most points (the maximum number of points available depends on the number of couples remaining in the competition). The public are also invited to vote for their favourite couples, and the couples are ranked again according to the number of votes they receive, again receiving points; the couple with the fewest votes receiving one point, and the couple with the most votes receiving the most points.

The points for judges' score and public vote are then added together, and the two couples with the fewest points are placed in the bottom two. If two couples have equal points, the points from the public vote are given precedence. The bottom two couples then perform a dance-off on the results show. Based on that performance alone, each judge then votes on which couple should stay and which couple should leave, with Len Goodman, as head judge, having the last and deciding vote.

== Couples ==
This series featured fourteen celebrity contestants.

Celebrity	Notability	Professional partner	Status
Brian Capron	Coronation Street actor	Karen Hardy	Eliminated 1st on 7 October 2007
Stephanie Beacham	Stage & screen actress	Vincent Simone	Eliminated 2nd on 14 October 2007
Willie Thorne	Snooker player	Erin Boag	Eliminated 3rd on 21 October 2007
Gabby Logan	BBC Sport presenter	James Jordan	Eliminated 4th on 28 October 2007
Dominic Littlewood	Journalist & television presenter	Lilia Kopylova	Eliminated 5th on 4 November 2007
Penny Lancaster-Stewart	Model & photographer	Ian Waite	Eliminated 6th on 11 November 2007
Kate Garraway	GMTV presenter	Anton Du Beke	Eliminated 7th on 18 November 2007
John Barnes	England footballer	Nicole Cutler	Eliminated 8th on 25 November 2007
Kelly Brook	Model & actress	Brendan Cole	Withdrew on 26 November 2007
Kenny Logan	Scotland rugby player	Ola Jordan	Eliminated 9th on 2 December 2007
Letitia Dean	EastEnders actress	Darren Bennett	Eliminated 10th on 9 December 2007
Gethin Jones	Blue Peter presenter	Camilla Dallerup	Eliminated 11th on 16 December 2007
Matt Di Angelo	EastEnders actor	Flavia Cacace	Runners-up on 22 December 2007
Alesha Dixon	Mis-Teeq singer	Matthew Cutler	Winners on 22 December 2007

== Scoring chart ==
The highest score each week is indicated in bold green with a dagger (†), while the lowest score each week is indicated in italicized red with a double-dagger (‡).

Color key:

Winners
Runners-up
Bottom two
Withdrew from competition
Eliminated

Strictly Come Dancing (series 5) - Weekly scores
Couple	Pl.	Week											
Couple	Pl.	1	2	3	4	5	6	7	8	9	10	11	12
Alesha & Matthew	1st	—N/a	31	**36**†	33	**36**†	35	**38**†	**39**†	38+36=**74**†	38+36=74 (Note: This couple was in the bottom two, but was not eliminated.)	38+38=**76**†	39+38+35=**112**† (Note: This couple finished in first place.)
Matt & Flavia	2nd	23	—N/a	30	**36**†	31	29	34	38	32+33=65	26+29=55‡	35+40=75	36+39+35=110‡ (Note: This couple finished in second place.)
Gethin & Camilla	3rd	22	—N/a	29	26	31	**36**†	31	34	39+35=**74**†	38+37=**75**†	34+36=70‡ (Note: This couple was eliminated.)	
Letitia & Darren	4th	—N/a	23	27	31	31	25	34	32	30+26=56	35+30=65		
Kenny & Ola	5th	21	—N/a	25	18	21‡	26	22	30	30+23=53‡			
Kelly & Brendan	6th	—N/a	**33**†	35	34	28	**36**†	36	29	(Note: This couple withdrew from the competition.)			
John & Nicole	7th	**26**†	—N/a	27	22	24	**36**†	28	27‡				
Kate & Anton	8th	—N/a	15‡	19‡	16‡	26	18‡	21‡					
Penny & Ian	9th	—N/a	**33**†	25	32	35	25						
Dominic & Lilia	10th	25	—N/a	25	26	25							
Gabby & James	11th	—N/a	29	31	30								
Willie & Erin	12th	24	—N/a	23									
Stephanie & Vincent	13th	—N/a	24										
Brian & Karen	14th	18‡											

=== Average chart ===
This table only counts for dances scored on a traditional 40-point scale.

Couple	Rank by average	Total points	Number of dances	Total average
Alesha & Matthew	1st	584	16	36.5
Kelly & Brendan	2nd	231	7	33.0
Gethin & Camilla	3rd	428	13	32.9
Matt & Flavia	3rd	526	16	32.9
Gabby & James	4th	90	3	30.0
Penny & Ian	4th	150	5	30.0
Letitia & Darren	5th	324	11	29.5
John & Nicole	6th	190	7	27.1
Dominic & Lilia	7th	101	4	25.3
Kenny & Ola	8th	216	9	24.0
Stephanie & Vincent	8th	24	1	24.0
Willie & Erin	9th	47	2	23.0
Kate & Anton	10th	115	6	19.2
Brian & Karen	11th	18	1	18.0

== Weekly scores ==
Unless indicated otherwise, individual judges scores in the charts below (given in parentheses) are listed in this order from left to right: Craig Revel Horwood, Arlene Phillips, Len Goodman, Bruno Tonioli.

=== Week 1 ===
Only the male celebrities performed this week, and they performed either the cha-cha-cha or the waltz. The couples who did not compete this week performed a group swing dance that was not scored. Couples are listed in the order they performed.

Couple	Scores	Dance	Music	Result
Matt & Flavia	23 (5, 6, 6, 6)	Cha-cha-cha	"Mama Told Me Not to Come" — Tom Jones & Stereophonics	Safe
Brian & Karen	18 (4, 4, 5, 5)	Waltz	"The Godfather Waltz" — Royal Philharmonic Orchestra	Eliminated
Dominic & Lilia	25 (6, 6, 7, 6)	Cha-cha-cha	"The Shoop Shoop Song (It's in His Kiss)" — Cher	Safe
Willie & Erin	24 (5, 5, 7, 7)	Waltz	"Run to You" — Whitney Houston	Safe
Gethin & Camilla	22 (4, 5, 7, 6)	Cha-cha-cha	"Haven't Stopped Dancing Yet" — Gonzalez	Safe
Kenny & Ola	21 (4, 5, 6, 6)	Waltz	"Are You Lonesome Tonight?" — Elvis Presley	Bottom two
John & Nicole	26 (6, 6, 7, 7)	Cha-cha-cha	"Uptight" — Stevie Wonder	Safe

Judges votes to save

- Horwood: Brian & Karen
- Phillips: Kenny & Ola
- Tonioli: Kenny & Ola
- Goodman: Kenny & Ola

=== Week 2 ===
Only the female celebrities performed this week, and they performed either the quickstep or the rumba. The couples who did not compete this week performed a group merengue that was not scored. Couples are listed in the order they performed.

Couple	Scores	Dance	Music	Result
Stephanie & Vincent	24 (6, 6, 6, 6)	Quickstep	"Suddenly I See" — KT Tunstall	Eliminated
Letitia & Darren	23 (4, 6, 7, 6)	Rumba	"How Deep Is Your Love" — Take That	Bottom two
Kate & Anton	15 (2, 4, 5, 4)	Quickstep	"Love Machine" — Girls Aloud	Safe
Alesha & Matthew	31 (8, 7, 8, 8)	Rumba	"Hurt" — Christina Aguilera	Safe
Penny & Ian	33 (8, 8, 8, 9)	Quickstep	"I'm Sitting on Top of the World" — Aretha Franklin	Safe
Kelly & Brendan	33 (8, 9, 8, 8)	Rumba	"She's Like the Wind" — Patrick Swayze	Safe
Gabby & James	29 (8, 7, 7, 7)	Quickstep	"Things" — Bobby Darin	Safe

Judges votes to save

- Horwood: Letitia & Darren
- Phillips: Stephanie & Vincent
- Tonioli: Letitia & Darren
- Goodman: Letitia & Darren

=== Week 3 ===
Couples performed either the jive or the tango, and are listed in the order they performed.

Couple	Scores	Dance	Music	Result
Gabby & James	31 (8, 7, 8, 8)	Jive	"Saturday Night's Alright for Fighting" — Elton John	Safe
Gethin & Camilla	29 (6, 7, 8, 8)	Tango	"Gold" — Spandau Ballet	Safe
Penny & Ian	25 (5, 6, 7, 7)	Jive	"Don't Stop Me Now" — Queen	Safe
Kenny & Ola	25 (6, 6, 7, 6)	Tango	"Call Me" — Blondie	Safe
Matt & Flavia	30 (7, 7, 8, 8)	Jive	"Shake, Rattle and Roll" — Bill Haley & His Comets	Safe
Kate & Anton	19 (4, 5, 5, 5)	Tango	"They" — Jem	Safe
Dominic & Lilia	25 (6, 6, 7, 6)	Jive	"Candyman" — Christina Aguilera	Safe
Letitia & Darren	27 (6, 7, 7, 7)	Tango	"Material Girl" — Madonna	Safe
John & Nicole	27 (6, 7, 7, 7)	Jive	"Reet Petite" — Jackie Wilson	Bottom two
Willie & Erin	23 (5, 6, 6, 6)	Tango	"Obertura" — Lisandro Adrover	Eliminated
Alesha & Matthew	36 (9, 9, 9, 9)	Jive	"Shake a Tail Feather" — Ray Charles	Safe
Kelly & Brendan	35 (9, 9, 8, 9)	Tango	"Gimme! Gimme! Gimme! (A Man After Midnight)" — ABBA	Safe

Judges votes to save

- Horwood: John & Nicole
- Phillips: John & Nicole
- Tonioli: John & Nicole
- Goodman: Did not vote, but would have voted to save John & Nicole

=== Week 4 ===
Couples performed either the American Smooth or the samba, and are listed in the order they performed.

Couple	Scores	Dance	Music	Result
Alesha & Matthew	33 (8, 8, 8, 9)	American Smooth	"Top Hat, White Tie and Tails" — Tony Bennett	Safe
Gabby & James	30 (7, 7, 8, 8)	Samba	"Eso Beso" — Paul Anka	Eliminated
Dominic & Lilia	26 (6, 6, 7, 7)	American Smooth	"Straighten Up and Fly Right" — Natalie Cole	Safe
Kate & Anton	16 (3, 3, 6, 4)	Samba	"Dancing Queen" — ABBA	Safe
John & Nicole	22 (4, 5, 7, 6)	American Smooth	"Stay with Me Baby" — Kiki Dee	Safe
Kenny & Ola	18 (3, 4, 6, 5)	Samba	"Mujer Latina" — Thalia	Safe
Kelly & Brendan	34 (8, 8, 8, 10)	American Smooth	"(Love Is) The Tender Trap" — Frank Sinatra	Safe
Gethin & Camilla	26 (6, 6, 7, 7)	Samba	"More Than a Woman" — Bee Gees	Safe
Letitia & Darren	31 (7, 8, 8, 8)	American Smooth	"Makin' Whoopee" — Ella Fitzgerald	Safe
Penny & Ian	32 (8, 7, 9, 8)	Samba	"These Boots Are Made for Walkin'" — Nancy Sinatra	Bottom two
Matt & Flavia	36 (9, 9, 9, 9)	American Smooth	"For Once in My Life" — Michael Bublé	Safe

Judges' votes to save

- Horwood: Gabby & James
- Phillips: Penny & Ian
- Tonioli: Penny & Ian
- Goodman: Penny & Ian

=== Week 5 ===
Couples performed either the foxtrot or the paso doble, and are listed in the order they performed.

Couple	Scores	Dance	Music	Result
Kelly & Brendan	28 (7, 7, 7, 7)	Paso doble	"You Give Love a Bad Name" — Bon Jovi	Safe
John & Nicole	24 (4, 6, 7, 7)	Foxtrot	"My Guy" — Mary Wells	Bottom two
Letitia & Darren	31 (7, 8, 8, 8)	Paso doble	"Live And Let Die" — Paul McCartney	Safe
Gethin & Camilla	31 (7, 8, 8, 8)	Foxtrot	"Don't It Make My Brown Eyes Blue" — Crystal Gayle	Safe
Kenny & Ola	21 (4, 5, 6, 6)	Paso doble	"Take Me Out" — Franz Ferdinand	Safe
Alesha & Matthew	36 (9, 9, 9, 9)	Foxtrot	"Heaven" — Bryan Adams	Safe
Dominic & Lilia	25 (5, 7, 7, 6)	Paso doble	"El Gato Montes" — Carlos Begasa	Eliminated
Kate & Anton	26 (5, 7, 7, 7)	Foxtrot	"I Could Write a Book" — Frank Sinatra	Safe
Matt & Flavia	31 (7, 8, 8, 8)	Paso doble	"Smooth Criminal" — Michael Jackson	Safe
Penny & Ian	35 (9, 8, 9, 9)	Foxtrot	"This Can't Be Love" — Nat King Cole	Safe

Judges' votes to save

- Horwood: John & Nicole
- Phillips: John & Nicole
- Tonioli: John & Nicole
- Goodman: Did not vote, but would have voted to save John & Nicole

=== Week 6 ===
Couples performed either the salsa or the Viennese waltz, and are listed in the order they performed.

Couple	Scores	Dance	Music	Result
Gethin & Camilla	36 (9, 9, 9, 9)	Viennese waltz	"Fallin'" — Alicia Keys	Safe
Penny & Ian	25 (6, 6, 7, 6)	Salsa	"Higher" — Gloria Estefan	Eliminated
Matt & Flavia	29 (8, 6, 7, 8)	Viennese waltz	"When a Man Loves a Woman" — Percy Sledge	Bottom two
Kate & Anton	18 (3, 4, 6, 5)	Salsa	"Peanut Vendor" — Dean Martin	Safe
Letitia & Darren	25 (6, 6, 7, 6)	Salsa	"Pastime Paradise" — Ray Barretto	Safe
Kenny & Ola	26 (5, 7, 8, 6)	Viennese waltz	"Flower of Scotland" — The Corries	Safe
John & Nicole	36 (8, 9, 10, 9)	Salsa	"Ran Kan Kan" — Tito Puente	Safe
Kelly & Brendan	36 (9, 9, 9, 9)	Viennese waltz	"Delilah" — Tom Jones	Safe
Alesha & Matthew	35 (9, 8, 9, 9)	Salsa	"Wanna Be Startin' Somethin'" — Michael Jackson	Safe

Judges' votes to save

- Horwood: Matt & Flavia
- Phillips: Penny & Ian
- Tonioli: Matt & Flavia
- Goodman: Matt & Flavia

=== Week 7 ===
Couples are listed in the order they performed.

Couple	Scores	Dance	Music	Result
Kelly & Brendan	36 (9, 9, 9, 9)	Jive	"Johnny B. Goode" — Chuck Berry	Safe
Letitia & Darren	34 (8, 8, 9, 9)	Foxtrot	"Call Me Irresponsible" — Bobby Darin	Safe
Kenny & Ola	22 (4, 5, 7, 6)	Cha-cha-cha	"Billie Jean" — Michael Jackson	Safe
Gethin & Camilla	31 (7, 8, 8, 8)	Rumba	"Lost" — Michael Bublé	Safe
John & Nicole	28 (6, 7, 8, 7)	Tango	"Dance with Me" — Debelah Morgan	Bottom two
Kate & Anton	21 (4, 5, 7, 5)	Paso doble	"Somebody Told Me" — The Killers	Eliminated
Alesha & Matthew	38 (9, 10, 9, 10)	Waltz	"A Time for Us" — Andy Williams	Safe
Matt & Flavia	34 (8, 9, 8, 9)	Quickstep	"Is You Is or Is You Ain't My Baby" — Dinah Washington	Safe

Judges' votes to save

- Horwood: John & Nicole
- Phillips: John & Nicole
- Tonioli: John & Nicole
- Goodman: Did not vote, but would have voted to save John & Nicole

=== Week 8 ===
Couples are listed in the order they performed.

Couple	Scores	Dance	Music	Result
Gethin & Camilla	34 (8, 9, 9, 8)	Quickstep	"You're the Top" — Louis Armstrong	Safe
John & Nicole	27 (7, 6, 7, 7)	Samba	"Sir Duke" — Stevie Wonder	Eliminated
Letitia & Darren	32 (8, 8, 7, 9)	Viennese waltz	"She's Always a Woman" — Billy Joel	Safe
Kelly & Brendan	29 (7, 7, 7, 8)	Samba	"Stayin' Alive" — Bee Gees	Bottom two
Kenny & Ola	30 (6, 8, 8, 8)	American Smooth	"How Sweet It Is (To Be Loved by You)" — Marvin Gaye	Safe
Matt & Flavia	38 (9, 10, 9, 10)	Salsa	"Vehicle" — Ides of March	Safe
Alesha & Matthew	39 (9, 10, 10, 10)	Cha-cha-cha	"Crazy in Love" — Beyoncé	Safe

Judges' votes to save

- Horwood: Kelly & Brendan
- Phillips: Kelly & Brendan
- Tonioli: Kelly & Brendan
- Goodman: Did not vote, but would have voted to save Kelly & Brendan

=== Week 9 ===
Kelly Brook withdrew from the competition earlier in the week after the death of her father.

Each couple performed two routines, and are listed in the order they performed.

Couple	Scores	Dance	Music	Result
Matt & Flavia	32 (7, 7, 9, 9)	Tango	"What You Waiting For?" — Gwen Stefani	Safe
Matt & Flavia	33 (8, 9, 8, 8)	Rumba	"Get Here" — Oleta Adams	Safe
Gethin & Camilla	39 (9, 10, 10, 10)	Waltz	"If I Were a Painting" — Willie Nelson	Safe
Gethin & Camilla	35 (8, 9, 9, 9)	Salsa	"Azúcar" — Eddie Palmieri	Safe
Letitia & Darren	30 (7, 7, 8, 8)	Quickstep	"Walkin' Back to Happiness" — Helen Shapiro	Bottom two
Letitia & Darren	26 (6, 6, 7, 7)	Cha-cha-cha	"Drive My Car" — The Beatles	Bottom two
Kenny & Ola	30 (7, 7, 8, 8)	Foxtrot	"They Can't Take That Away from Me" — Robbie Williams	Eliminated
Kenny & Ola	23 (4, 5, 7, 7)	Rumba	"Fields of Gold" — Eva Cassidy	Eliminated
Alesha & Matthew	38 (9, 10, 9, 10)	Tango	"Jealousy" — Billy Fury	Safe
Alesha & Matthew	36 (9, 8, 10, 9)	Samba	"Reach Out, I'll Be There" — The Four Tops	Safe

Judges' votes to save

- Horwood: Letitia & Darren
- Phillips: Letitia & Darren
- Tonioli: Letitia & Darren
- Goodman: Did not vote, but would have voted to save Letitia & Darren

=== Week 10: Quarterfinal ===
Each couple performed two routines, and are listed in the order they performed.

Couple	Scores	Dance	Music	Result
Gethin & Camilla	38 (9, 9, 10, 10)	American Smooth	"Green Green Grass of Home" — Tom Jones	Safe
Gethin & Camilla	37 (9, 9, 9, 10)	Jive	"Knock on Wood" — Amii Stewart	Safe
Alesha & Matthew	38 (9, 9, 10, 10)	Viennese waltz	"Memory" — from Cats	Bottom two
Alesha & Matthew	36 (9, 9, 9, 9)	Paso doble	"Toccata" — Vanessa Mae	Bottom two
Letitia & Darren	35 (8, 9, 9, 9)	Waltz	"The Impossible Dream (The Quest)" — Andy Williams	Eliminated
Letitia & Darren	30 (7, 7, 8, 8)	Jive	"Dead Ringer for Love" — Meat Loaf & Cher	Eliminated
Matt & Flavia	26 (4, 6, 8, 8)	Foxtrot	"Better Together" — Jack Johnson	Safe
Matt & Flavia	29 (6, 7, 8, 8)	Samba	"Blame It on the Boogie" — The Jacksons	Safe

Judges' votes to save

- Horwood: Alesha & Matthew
- Phillips: Alesha & Matthew
- Tonioli: Alesha & Matthew
- Goodman: Did not vote, but would have voted to save Alesha & Matthew

=== Week 11: Semifinal ===
Each couple performed two routines, one of which was the Argentine tango, and are listed in the order they performed.

Couple	Scores	Dance	Music	Result
Alesha & Matthew	38 (9, 9, 10, 10)	Quickstep	"Valerie" — Amy Winehouse	Safe
Alesha & Matthew	38 (9, 9, 10, 10)	Argentine tango	"I'd Be Surprisingly Good For You" — from Evita	Safe
Matt & Flavia	35 (8, 9, 9, 9)	Argentine tango	"La Yumba" — Osvaldo Pugliese	Bottom two
Matt & Flavia	40 (10, 10, 10, 10)	Waltz	"Open Arms" — Mariah Carey	Bottom two
Gethin & Camilla	34 (8, 8, 10, 8)	Paso doble	"Standing in the Way of Control" — The Gossip	Eliminated
Gethin & Camilla	36 (9, 9, 9, 9)	Argentine tango	"The World Is Not Enough" — Garbage	Eliminated

Judges' votes to save

- Horwood: Matt & Flavia
- Phillips: Gethin & Camilla
- Tonioli: Matt & Flavia
- Goodman: Matt & Flavia

=== Week 12: Final ===
Each couple performed four routines: their favourite ballroom dance, their favourite Latin dance, one dance performed to the same song, and their showdance routine. Couples are listed in the order they performed.

Couple	Scores	Dance	Music	Result
Matt & Flavia	36 (9, 9, 9, 9)	American Smooth	"For Once in My Life" — Michael Bublé	Runners-up
Matt & Flavia	39 (9, 10, 10, 10)	Salsa	"Vehicle" — Ides of March	Runners-up
Matt & Flavia	35 (9, 8, 9, 9)	Quickstep	"I Love to Boogie" — T. Rex	Runners-up
Matt & Flavia	No scores received	Showdance	"Are You Gonna Go My Way" — Lenny Kravitz	Runners-up
Alesha & Matthew	39 (10, 10, 9, 10)	Waltz	"A Time for Us" — Andy Williams	Winners
Alesha & Matthew	38 (9, 9, 10, 10)	Cha-cha-cha	"Crazy in Love" — Beyoncé	Winners
Alesha & Matthew	35 (9, 8, 9, 9)	Jive	"I Love to Boogie" — T. Rex	Winners
Alesha & Matthew	No scores received	Showdance	"Holding Out for a Hero" — Bonnie Tyler	Winners

== Dance chart ==
The couples performed the following each week:

- Week 1: One unlearned dance (cha-cha-cha or waltz); group swing dance
- Week 2: One unlearned dance (quickstep or rumba); group merengue
- Week 3: One unlearned dance (jive or tango)
- Week 4: One unlearned dance (American Smooth or samba)
- Week 5: One unlearned dance (foxtrot or paso doble)
- Week 6: One unlearned dance (salsa or Viennese waltz)
- Weeks 7–8: One unlearned dance
- Week 9: Two unlearned dances
- Week 10 (Quarterfinal): Two unlearned dances
- Week 11 (Semifinal): One unlearned dance & Argentine tango
- Week 12 (Final): Favourite ballroom dance, favourite Latin dance, one new dance & showdance

Strictly Come Dancing (series 5) - Dance chart
Couple	Week																	
Couple	1	2	3	4	5	6	7	8	9		10		11		12			
Alesha & Matthew	Group; Swing	Rumba	Jive	American Smooth	Foxtrot	Salsa	Waltz	Cha-cha-cha	Tango	Samba	Viennese waltz	Paso doble	Quickstep	Argentine tango	Waltz	Cha-cha-cha	Jive	Showdance
Matt & Flavia	Cha-cha-cha	Group; Merengue	Jive	American Smooth	Paso doble	Viennese waltz	Quickstep	Salsa	Tango	Rumba	Foxtrot	Samba	Argentine tango	Waltz	American Smooth	Salsa	Quickstep	Showdance
Gethin & Camilla	Cha-cha-cha	Group Merengue	Tango	Samba	Foxtrot	Viennese waltz	Rumba	Quickstep	Waltz	Salsa	American Smooth	Jive	Paso doble	Argentine tango				
Letitia & Darren	Group Swing	Rumba	Tango	American Smooth	Paso doble	Salsa	Foxtrot	Viennese waltz	Quickstep	Cha-cha-cha	Waltz	Jive						
Kenny & Ola	Waltz	Group Merengue	Tango	Samba	Paso doble	Viennese waltz	Cha-cha-cha	American Smooth	Foxtrot	Rumba								
Kelly & Brendan	Group Swing	Rumba	Tango	American Smooth	Paso doble	Viennese waltz	Jive	Samba										
John & Nicole	Cha-cha-cha	Group Merengue	Jive	American Smooth	Foxtrot	Salsa	Tango	Samba										
Kate & Anton		Quickstep	Tango	Samba	Foxtrot	Salsa	Paso doble											
Penny & Ian	Group Swing	Quickstep	Jive	Samba	Foxtrot	Salsa												
Dominic & Lilia	Cha-cha-cha	Group Merengue	Jive	American Smooth	Paso doble													
Gabby & James	Group Swing	Quickstep	Jive	Samba														
Willie & Erin	Waltz	Group Merengue	Tango															
Stephanie & Vincent	Group Swing	Quickstep																
Brian & Karen	Waltz																	

== Ratings ==
Weekly ratings for each show on BBC One. All ratings are provided by BARB.

Episode	Date	Official rating (millions)	Weekly rank for BBC One	Weekly rank for all UK TV
Preview	29 September	4.87	20	40
Week 1	6 October	7.68	5	14
Week 1 results	7 October	7.03	6	19
Week 2	13 October	8.51	4	10
Week 2 results	14 October	8.15	5	11
Week 3	20 October	7.69	4	16
Week 3 results	21 October	6.98	5	20
Week 4	27 October	8.28	6	13
Week 4 results	28 October	8.42	5	12
Week 5	3 November	9.25	5	11
Week 5 results	4 November	8.65	6	13
Week 6	10 November	9.65	2	8
Week 6 results	11 November	8.64	6	13
Week 7	17 November	9.41	4	8
Week 7 results	18 November	9.06	5	12
Week 8	24 November	9.70	3	8
Week 8 results	25 November	8.71	6	13
Week 9	1 December	10.22	2	7
Week 9 results	2 December	8.88	5	11
Week 10	8 December	10.45	2	5
Week 10 results	9 December	9.16	5	12
Week 11	15 December	10.97	1	5
Week 11 results	16 December	8.38	6	15
Week 12	22 December	11.23	2	4
Week 12 results	22 December	12.09	1	1
Series average (excl. preview)	2007	9.05	—N/a	—N/a
