= Matt Dawson =

British Lions & England international rugby union player

Matt Dawson MBE
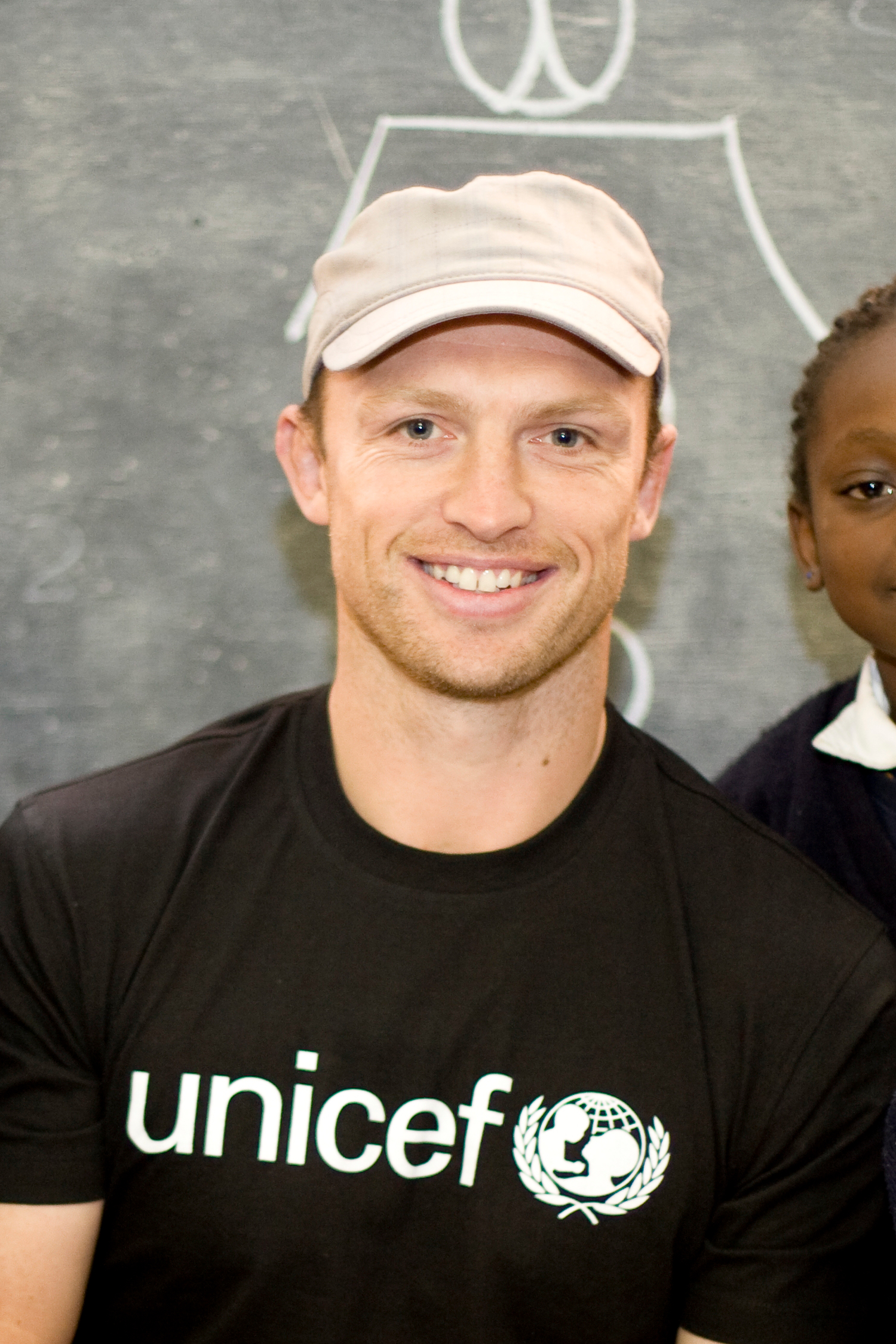
- Dawson in 2009.
- Born: Matthew James Sutherland Dawson; 31 October 1972 (age 54) Birkenhead, England
- Height: 1.78 m (5 ft 10 in)
- Weight: 13.10 st (83.2 kg)
- School: RGS High Wycombe

Rugby union career
- Position: Scrum-half
- Current team: retired
Amateur team(s)
Years	Team	Apps	(Points)
- Marlow Rugby Club
Senior career
Years	Team	Apps	(Points)
1991–2004	Northampton	246	(693)
2004–2006	London Wasps	44	(30)
- Correct as of 13 July 2014
International career
Years	Team	Apps	(Points)
1995–2006	England	77	(101)
1997, 2001, 2005	British & Irish Lions	7	(10)
- Correct as of 13 July 2014
National sevens team
Years	Team		Comps
1993	England 7s		

Matthew James Sutherland Dawson, MBE (born 31 October 1972) is an English retired rugby union player who played scrum half for Northampton Saints and then London Wasps. During his international career he toured with the British & Irish Lions three times and was part of England's 2003 Rugby World Cup winning side. He won 77 caps for his country in total, including nine as captain and was England's most capped scrum half until passed by Danny Care.

Dawson was best known for his trademark 'sniping runs' and played the whistle well, often scoring tries from 'tap and go' penalties. When called upon, he could also demonstrate his versatility by kicking goals.

Since retiring, Dawson has become a team captain on A Question of Sport besides appearing on various reality shows and is a commentator and presenter on BBC Radio 5 Live's rugby programme. Dawson currently works as a health ambassador for Sodexo, a global food and facilities provider. In early 2014, he was appointed as director for business development at the flexible workplace company, Instant.

== Rugby career ==
=== Club ===
Dawson joined Northampton in 1991 after leaving school and was among the last generation of players to have started their careers during the amateur era. Before rugby union became openly professional in 1995, he worked as a security guard and coached at Spratton Hall School. He formed a successful half-back partnership with Paul Grayson, winning the 2000 Heineken Cup (though he missed the final through injury) and finishing runner-up in the Anglo-Welsh Cup three times. In the club's 130th anniversary poll he and Grayson were voted by fans into the all-time dream XV.

In 2004, Dawson moved from Northampton to London Wasps after his contract was not renewed and won the Premiership title in his first season.

On 7 April 2006, Dawson announced that he would be retiring from rugby completely at the end of the season and on 14 May 2006, he played his last game of Premiership rugby, when Sale denied Wasps their chance of winning the Premiership title four years in a row and so equalling Leicester's record.

=== International ===
In 1993, Dawson was a member of the England Sevens team which won the inaugural Sevens World Cup in Scotland. Dawson and competition teammate Lawrence Dallaglio were the first players to win the World Cup at both the 15- and 7-a-side games. Ma'a Nonu & Mils Muliaina have since repeated this feat.

Dawson made his international debut for England in December 1995, against Western Samoa, but would have to fight with Andy Gomarsall, Austin Healey but mostly Kyran Bracken for the England number 9 shirt.

Dawson went on the 1997 British Lions tour to South Africa as third-choice scrum-half behind Healey and Rob Howley, but injury to Howley and some good performances saw Dawson make the starting line-up. In the first test with ten minutes to go, Dawson broke from the base of a scrum and threw an overhead dummy that checked the four Springboks allowing him to scamper in for the winning try. That victory was the start of a 2–1 series win, clinched when he fed Jeremy Guscott for the series-winning drop goal.

Dawson captained England for the first time when he was chosen as captain for the infamous 1998 "tour from hell" in the absence of more experienced internationals. Despite the disastrous results he would go on to establish himself in the starting XV. He became first-choice scrum half at the 1999 Rugby World Cup after Bracken's withdrawal due to injury and scored England's first try of the competition just eight minutes into the opening match, a 67–7 win, against Italy.

He was captain in the 2000 Six Nations and often in the absence of Martin Johnson.

In the 2001 British & Irish Lions tour to Australia, Dawson went as second-choice scrum half behind Howley. Howley played in the first two tests but was injured for the third, where Dawson played. Controversially however, Dawson was one of the mid-week sides opposed to the training regime of coach Graham Henry and publicly criticised him, although this did not cause as much stir as Healey's similar comments. He and Healey avoided being sent home but were fined by the disciplinary committee. Later in the week he redeemed himself by converting Healey's try during extra time to win a closely tied match against the Brumbies.

Dawson's career nearly ended after sustaining a neck injury during the record 53–3 win against South Africa in November 2002, when he was headbutted by Springbok skipper Corné Krige. He became an integral part of the England side, winning his 50th cap against Ireland on the same day England won the 2003 Six Nations Grand Slam. That same year he was a crucial part of the team that won the World Cup. He played a vital role in winning the final tie against Australia in Sydney on 22 November 2003. With less than a minute remaining in extra time he made a completely unexpected break gaining a vital 20 metres upfield. From the later ruck he fed the ball to Jonny Wilkinson for the winning drop goal.

In the autumn of 2004, he failed to turn up to an England training camp due to a previously arranged commitment to appear on A Question of Sport, resulting in him being dropped from the England squad for the 2004 Autumn internationals. A return to the 2005 Six Nations was expected and Dawson rejoined the Elite Player Squad for the tournament, playing well enough to earn a place on the 2005 British Lions tour to New Zealand, managed by Sir Clive Woodward.

Dawson returned to the England fold in 2006 but had limited opportunities in a disappointing Six Nations campaign as Harry Ellis started at number nine for four of the five matches.

== Media career ==
In 2004, Dawson joined the long running BBC TV quiz show A Question of Sport, featuring as a regular team captain opposite Ally McCoist and subsequently, Phil Tufnell.

In September 2006, he appeared in BBC One's Celebrity MasterChef programme, beating Roger Black and Hardeep Singh Kohli, to win the final.

He took part in Strictly Come Dancing in 2006, partnered by Lilia Kopylova. Although appearing initially to be an unlikely contender, he came second, only beaten in the final by cricketer Mark Ramprakash. He later returned to the show in 2008 to dance with Elaine Paige in Sport Relief does Strictly Come Dancing to raise money for Sport Relief, where they came second.

In January 2007, it was announced that Dawson would be joining BBC Radio 5 Live as summariser for the commentary on England's forthcoming Six Nations Championship games. He went on to cover the 2007 Rugby World Cup for the BBC. He also presents 5-Live's weekly Rugby show. He was recently on an edition of www.888.com TV poker special where he finished second.

In 2008, Dawson co-hosted Mitch and Matt's Big Fish, a seafood lovers tour of the British coast, in which he and Mitch Tonks tasted and cooked a variety of fish dishes using the catch of the British fishing ports.

In 2010, Dawson hosted Monster Munchies for Good Food, where he challenged two teams to make a monster sized local delicacy in 24 hours, which were unveiled at a local show and were judged on size, presentation and taste. The size they were aiming for was that of a small car.

In 2023, Dawson was a contestant on Richard Osman's House of Games, alongside Malorie Blackman, Chris McCausland and Ranvir Singh.

== Charitable work ==
Dawson is the 2013 President of children's medical research charity Sparks, whose mission is to ensure that all babies are born healthy and stay healthy. He attended their 2012 Winter Ball along with other supporters of the charity such as Lady Gabriella Windsor, who was in attendance in place of her mother, Sparks Royal Patron, Princess Michael of Kent. In 2015, he fronted a cycle ride for the charity from the Millennium Stadium in Cardiff to Twickenham in London, 150 miles in one day.

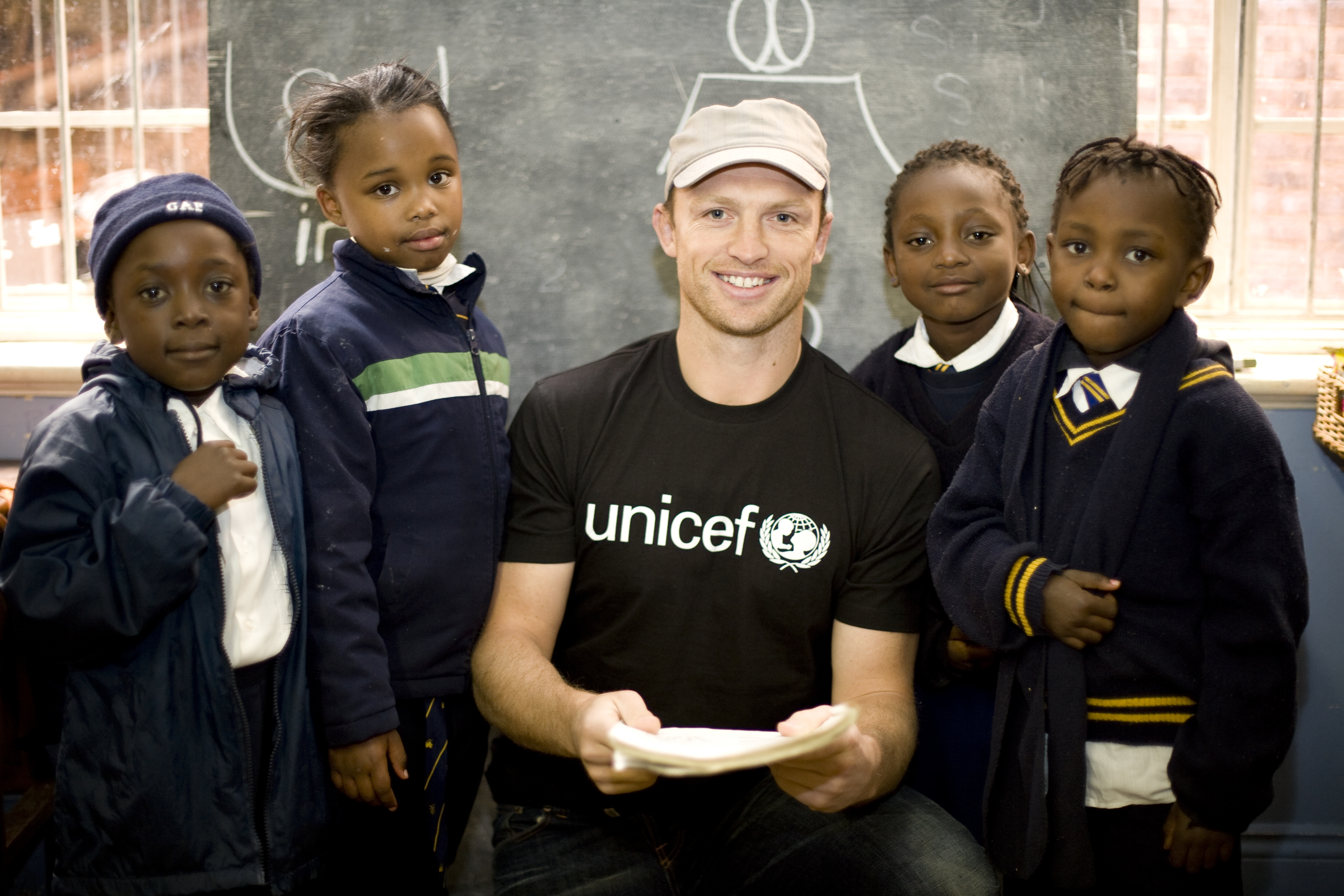
Dawson in Johannesburg with pupils of a UNICEF-funded school.

He is an Honorary President of the rugby charity Wooden Spoon improving the lives of disadvantaged children and young people in Britain and Ireland. He posed nude in the women's magazine Cosmopolitan in support of the testicular and prostate cancer charity Everyman.

Dawson has been supporting the United Nations Children's Fund (UNICEF) since 2004 and became a UNICEF UK ambassador in 2009. In June 2009, he took time out while broadcasting for the Lions tour in South Africa to visit UNICEF programmes focusing on education, shelter and HIV/AIDS.

He completed the 2007 London Marathon for charity, in 4 hours 35 minutes and 39 seconds.

- Patron of The National Hospital Development Foundation (NHDF)
- Patron of Beating Bowel Cancer – a leading UK charity for bowel cancer patients, working to raise awareness of symptoms, promote early diagnosis and encourage open access to treatment choice for those affected by bowel cancer.

== Personal life ==
Born in Birkenhead, Dawson was raised in Buckinghamshire and attended the Royal Grammar School, High Wycombe after passing the 12-plus (Buckinghamshire students at the time took the exam a year later). While in school he excelled in cricket and football before deciding to concentrate on rugby.

He was married to German-born former model, Carolin Hauskeller, and the couple have two sons. Dawson announced their separation via social media on 21 September 2020. Dawson is a supporter of Everton F.C.

Dawson published his autobiography, Nine Lives, in 2004.

In 2016, Dawson revealed how his family went through "two weeks of hell" as his two-year-old son battled meningitis W135.

In 2017, Dawson joined forces with The Big Tick Project, which looks to raise awareness about the dangers of ticks and tick-borne disease in the UK after revealing he had contracted Lyme disease. He was bitten by a tick in a London Park early the previous year.

== See also ==
- List of top English points scorers and try scorers

Sporting positions
Preceded by Tony Diprose	English National Rugby Union Captain; Jun–Jul 1998	Succeeded by Martin Johnson
Preceded by Martin Johnson	English National Rugby Union Captain; Feb–Apr 2000	Succeeded by Martin Johnson
Preceded by Kyran Bracken	English National Rugby Union Captain; Oct 2001	Succeeded by Neil Back

Preceded by Colin Jackson and Erin Boag	Strictly Come Dancing runner up (with partner Lilia Kopylova); Series 4 (2006)	Succeeded by Matt Di Angelo and Flavia Cacace
