= Lilia Kopylova =

Russian professional dancer (born 1978)

- Лилия Копылова
- Born: Lilia Andreyevna Kopylova; 18 June 1978 (age 47); Moscow, Russian SFSR, Soviet Union
- Occupation: Dancer
- Spouse: Darren Bennett (m. 1999)
- Children: 2

Lilia Andreyevna Kopylova (Russian: Лилия Андреевна Копылова; born 18 June 1978) is a Russian professional dancer.

With her husband Darren Bennett, she has been competing as an amateur since July 1997 and as a professional since May 2003. The couple has achieved considerable success in the professional Latin style of dancing, both nationally in the UK and internationally.

== Biography ==
Kopylova started ice skating aged four, winning the title of junior Moscow champion aged nine.

In 1987, she started training as a dancer. Her dance partner was Mikhail Batashov, a Danish champion, and in 1990 they won USSR competition; and a year later, they were the first Soviet pair of their age to be allowed abroad to dance. They won the 1990 Danish Open in Copenhagen, followed by success that same year in France and Italy.

In 1994, Kopylova represented Russia in the International dance championships in Denmark. In 1997, she was introduced to Darren Bennett and five months later, having moved to the UK, they won the International and British amateur Youth Championships in July 1997. The couple turned professional in 2003, and are now regarded as one of Britain's finest Latin American dance couples and make regular appearances on British TV. Kopylova's favourite dances are the rumba and the foxtrot.

In November 2005, Bennett and Kopylova won the British Championships for Professional Latin, coming first in all five dances. In November 2006, they successfully defended this title against a challenge from Olga Rodionova and Paul Richardson, who had previously been competing for the USA but had recently registered as a British couple. Bennett and Kopylova eventually triumphed, again winning all five dances to retain the title.

Other competitive highlights include winning the Rising Star professional Latin title of Blackpool Dance Festival in 2003, and reaching the final of the professional Latin competition in the 2005 Blackpool Dance Festival.

In February 2008, Bennett and Kopylova were winners of the Carl Alan Award for Ballroom, Latin and Sequence (performers)- a prestigious title described by the IDTA as 'the Oscars of the world of dance'.

Bennett and Kopylova are part of the team behind the "Essentially Dance", a scheme for British children to learn ballroom and Latin American dance, in a bid to tackle childhood obesity and promote social skills. Funded by the Aldridge Foundation and launched on 22 June 2009, it was filmed and produced by Winning Pitch TV.

The couple starred in a West End dance show, Latin Fever, which they choreographed themselves, as well as choosing the music and costumes to reflect the mood of each Latin dance.

More recently, Kopylova has been choreographer for Dancing with the Stars (Irish version) alongside her husband Darren Bennett who was the consultant creative producer.

== Strictly Come Dancing ==
In Autumn 2004, Kopylova competed in the BBC One pro-celebrity ballroom dancing television programme Strictly Come Dancing, dancing with celebrity singer Aled Jones. They finished fourth overall and fourth in the following Christmas Champion of Champions show. Her husband Darren Bennett won both shows with Jill Halfpenny.

Kopylova won the 2005 series, partnered with Darren Gough, who was the first male celebrity to win the title. The couple went on to win the Christmas Champion of Champions trophy, including a dance with a perfect score of 40 out of 40. The show featured couples from the 2004 and 2005 series, as well as Rachel Hunter and Evander Holyfield from the US version of the show, Dancing with the Stars.

Kopylova participated in the fourth series of the show partnered by Matt Dawson a former England Rugby Union scrum half. They were runners up, losing to Mark Ramprakash and Karen Hardy. This result made Kopylova the first, and as of 2009, the only professional dancer to make it to the top 2 twice. In the Christmas Special that year, they were the only couple from series four to receive a perfect ten from the judges.

In Series Five, she partnered presenter Dominic Littlewood. They were eliminated in the fifth round of the competition. She was also reunited with her Series Three partner Darren Gough for the 2007 Christmas Special, in which they received another perfect score for their American Smooth, and won the competition. In total, Gough and Kopylova have now won three Strictly trophies—more than any couple in the history of the show.

In January and February 2008, Kopylova competed in the live tour of Strictly Come Dancing, again dancing with her Series Three partner Darren Gough. Performing at a number of venues across the UK, they were winners or runners up on numerous occasions.

She was knocked out in week five of the sixth series, paired with actor Don Warrington.

In January/February on the Strictly 2009 Tour, Kopylova danced with comedian Julian Clary.

In the seventh series of Strictly Come Dancing beginning in September 2009, Kopylova was partnered by jockey Richard Dunwoody. The pair found themselves in the bottom 2 of the second week of competition against Flavia Cacace and Craig Kelly and were eliminated.

Kopylova is the head of the judging panel on the Turkish version Yok Böyle Dans.

=== Performances ===
Year	Series	Celebrity partner	Week #	Dance	Judges' scores				
Year	Series	Celebrity partner	Week #	Dance	Horwood	Phillips/ Dixon	Goodman	Tonioli	Total
2004	2	Aled Jones	1	Cha-Cha-Cha	7	7	8	7	29
2004	2	Aled Jones	2	Quickstep	7	6	7	7	27
2004	2	Aled Jones	3	Jive	8	8	8	8	32
2004	2	Aled Jones	4	Foxtrot	7	6	6	6	25
2004	2	Aled Jones	5	Samba	6	8	8	8	30
2004	2	Aled Jones	6	Waltz	7	7	7	8	29
2004	2	Aled Jones	6	Rumba	5	6	8	8	27
2004	2	Aled Jones	7	Tango	6	7	7	7	27
2004	2	Aled Jones	7	Paso Doble	7	7	8	8	30
2004	2	Aled Jones	Christmas	Samba	7	7	8	8	30
2005	3	Darren Gough	1	Cha-Cha-Cha	3	4	6	6	19
2005	3	Darren Gough	2	Quickstep	7	7	8	8	30
2005	3	Darren Gough	3	Tango	8	9	8	8	33
2005	3	Darren Gough	4	Paso Doble	8	9	9	8	34
2005	3	Darren Gough	5	Viennese Waltz	6	7	8	7	28
2005	3	Darren Gough	6	Jive	7	7	8	8	30
2005	3	Darren Gough	7	Foxtrot	8	8	9	9	34
2005	3	Darren Gough	8	Rumba	8	7	8	7	30
2005	3	Darren Gough	8	American Smooth	8	8	8	8	32
2005	3	Darren Gough	9	Waltz	9	9	9	8	35
2005	3	Darren Gough	9	Samba	6	7	9	7	29
2005	3	Darren Gough	10	Foxtrot	8	9	10	9	36
2005	3	Darren Gough	10	Paso Doble	9	9	9	9	36
2005	3	Darren Gough	Christmas	Quickstep	10	10	10	10	40
2006	4	Matt Dawson	1	Cha-Cha-Cha	2	5	6	6	19
2006	4	Matt Dawson	3	Tango	8	7	7	8	30
2006	4	Matt Dawson	4	Paso Doble	7	7	7	7	28
2006	4	Matt Dawson	5	Salsa	5	6	7	7	25
2006	4	Matt Dawson	6	American Smooth	8	8	9	9	34
2006	4	Matt Dawson	7	Waltz	9	9	10	9	37
2006	4	Matt Dawson	8	Jive	6	7	8	7	28
2006	4	Matt Dawson	9	Quickstep	8	8	9	9	34
2006	4	Matt Dawson	9	Rumba	6	6	8	7	27
2006	4	Matt Dawson	10	Viennese Waltz	6	7	8	8	29
2006	4	Matt Dawson	10	Samba	8	8	8	8	32
2006	4	Matt Dawson	11	Foxtrot	9	8	9	9	35
2006	4	Matt Dawson	11	Argentine Tango	7	7	8	8	30
2006	4	Matt Dawson	12	Waltz	9	9	10	10	38
2006	4	Matt Dawson	12	Samba	7	7	9	8	31
2006	4	Matt Dawson	12	Quickstep	9	9	9	9	36
2006	4	Matt Dawson	Christmas	Waltz	9	9	10	9	37
2007	5	Dominic Littlewood	1	Cha-Cha-Cha	6	6	7	6	25
2007	5	Dominic Littlewood	3	Jive	6	6	7	6	25
2007	5	Dominic Littlewood	4	American Smooth	6	6	7	7	26
2007	5	Dominic Littlewood	5	Paso Doble	5	7	7	6	25
2007	5	Darren Gough	Christmas	American Smooth	10	10	10	10	40
2008	6	Don Warrington	1	Cha-Cha-Cha	3	5	6	5	19
2008	6	Don Warrington	3	Tango	7	7	8	8	30
2008	6	Don Warrington	5	American Smooth	6	6	7	6	25
2009	7	Richard Dunwoody	2	Waltz	4	5	5	5	19
2009	7	Richard Dunwoody	2	Cha-Cha-Cha	4	5	5	5	19

== Personal life ==
In January 1999, Kopylova married dance partner Darren Bennett. In December 2004, she became a British citizen. They have two daughters, born in 2015 and 2020.
