= Monster Munchies =

- Genre: Cookery
- Presented by: Matt Dawson
- Voices of: Matt Dawson
- Country of origin: United Kingdom
- Original language: English
- No. of series: 2
- No. of episodes: 20

Production
- Executive producer: Will Smith
- Producer: Tracy Forsyth
- Running time: 45 minutes
- Production company: RDF Television

Original release
- Network: Good Food HD
- Release: 2011

Monster Munchies is a cookery show which was broadcast on the British television channel Good Food. It was hosted by Matt Dawson.

== Format ==
Teams made up of local cooks from the location where the episodes were filmed were assigned challenges and their results were judged on size, taste and presentation.

== Series 2 ==
Series 2 began airing in November 2011.
