= Izabela Hannah =

Polish dancer

- Born: Szczecin, Poland
- Citizenship: British
- Occupations: Ballroom dancer, choreographer, director
- Years active: 1985–
- Television: Strictly Come Dancing

Izabela Hannah is a Polish-born British ballroom and Latin American dancer. Born in Szczecin, Poland, Hannah began dancing jazz and ballet at the age of 9, and started ballroom and Latin American dancing as a teenager. During her competitive career she won international titles in Europe and the United States, winning the Polish Amateur Ballroom Championships in 2001 and again in 2002.

In 2005, Hannah appeared as a professional dancer in the third series of the British BBC TV talent show Strictly Come Dancing, partnered with former snooker world champion Dennis Taylor. Described as "Strictly Come Dancing's very own odd couple", the pair survived five weeks in the competition. In 2009, Hannah joined other Strictly Come Dancing professionals on Brendan Cole's UK tour 'Live and Unjudged'.

== Strictly Come Dancing performances ==
Series	Partner	Place	Average
3	Dennis Taylor	8th	19.6

=== Performances with Dennis Taylor ===
Week	Dance & song	Judges' score				Total	Result
Week	Dance & song	Horwood	Phillips	Goodman	Tonioli	Total	Result
1	Cha-cha-cha / "Music"	5	5	5	5	20	Safe
2	Quickstep / "I'm So Excited"	4	5	5	4	18	Safe
3	Jive / "Jailhouse Rock"	4	6	6	6	22	Safe
4	Paso doble / "Eye of the Tiger"	2	3	5	5	15	Bottom two
5	Samba / "La Bamba"	5	5	6	7	23	Eliminated

== Sources ==
- "Izabela Hannah official biography". Archived from the original on 14 December 2009.
- "Series 3 professional dancers". BBC press office. 26 September 2009.
- "IZABELADANCE - Leading UK Ballroom Dance School". Archived from the original on 2015-01-02.
- "WEDDINGFD - Leading UK Ballroom Dance School". Archived from the original on 2014-12-22.
