= Ian Waite =

British dancer

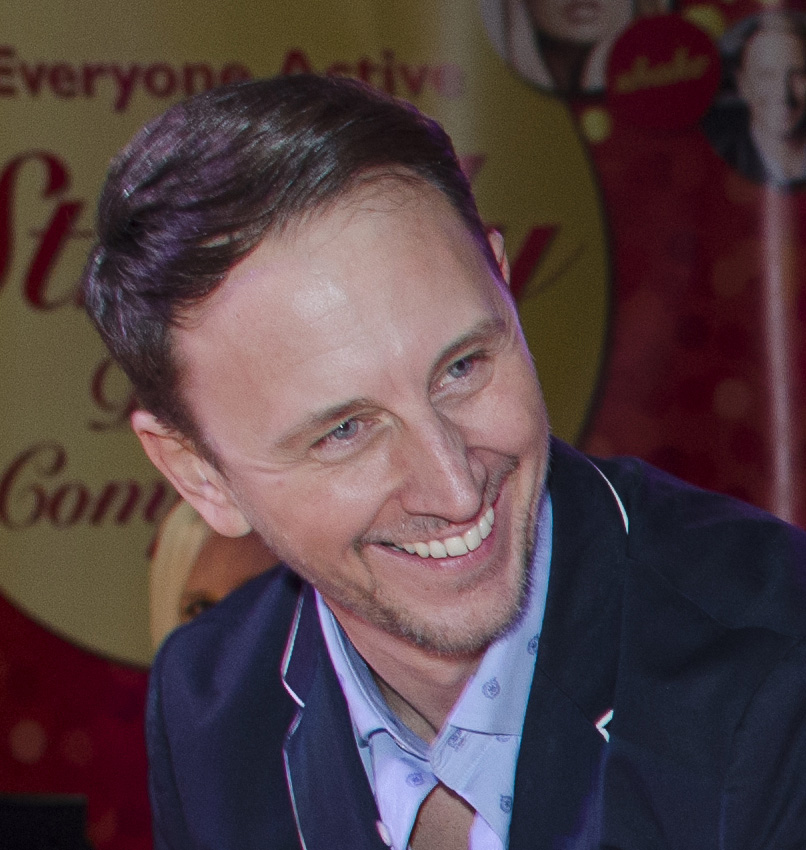
- Born: 29 January 1971 (age 55); Reading, Berkshire
- Occupations: Dancer, choreographer
- Known for: Strictly Come Dancing (2004–09); Strictly Come Dancing: It Takes Two (2010–2020); Dancing with the Stars (Australian TV series) (2023–)
- Spouse: Drew Merriman (m. 2017)

Ian Waite (born 29 January 1971) is a British professional dancer specialising in Latin American dance, a teacher and choreographer.

== Biography ==
Waite was born in Reading, Berkshire. He started dancing at the age of 10. Mary Richardson, a former Latin American champion (and now his stepmother) put him through a rigorous medallist regime. By the age of 14, he had completed all his grades and won almost every competition that he had entered. He went on to the open circuit where he achieved international success by becoming the European Youth Latin American Champion. This started a ten-year partnership with Melanie Walker (now Melanie Lane), with whom he competed all over the world, representing England in many World and European championships.

He turned professional in 1997 and formed a partnership with the former Latin American world champion, Inga Haas. After nine months, they came third in the British Professional Rising Stars.

He decided to further his dance career by moving to the Netherlands to train with the choreographer and dance coach, Ruud Vermeij. There, he formed a four-year partnership with Natalia Panina, with whom he won the Dutch Championship. They also made the final of both the World Showdance Championship and the European Professional Latin American Championship. He went on to dance with Daisy Croes, from Belgium, who now appears on the Belgian version of Strictly Come Dancing.

After five years in the Netherlands he returned to home. By the summer of 2004, he had started to dance with Camilla Dallerup. Their first competition was the International Championships at the Royal Albert Hall, where they made the semi-final and in November of that year, they made the final of the British National Dance Championships.

Waite lives in Finchampstead in Berkshire, and has expanded his career involving lecturing, demonstration dancing and big spectaculars. He has also made a dance video with Angela Rippon and presented a documentary called 'Inside Out' for BBC South following the progress of a young couple from Bournemouth. With Camilla Dallerup he performs a series of ballroom and Latin dances on the DVD The Magic of Dance.

Waite created a Ballroom and Latin dance fitness programme with Mark Foster and fellow Strictly Come Dancing professional Natalie Lowe called FitSteps.

== Strictly Come Dancing ==
Waite has taken part in 7 series of Strictly Come Dancing, a popular televised celebrity ballroom competition, appearing as a professional dancer. His partners on the programme have been:

- Athlete Denise Lewis with whom he finished runners-up in 2004.
- Presenter Zoë Ball, with whom he made the final in 2005, finishing in 3rd place.
- Singer Mica Paris, with whom he was eliminated in the second week in 2006.
- Model Penny Lancaster-Stewart with whom he made the sixth week of the competition in 2007.
- Model Jodie Kidd, with whom he made the tenth week of the competition, finishing in sixth place in 2008.
- Athlete Jade Johnson, with whom he reached the ninth week of the competition before having to pull out due to an injury sustained by Johnson in rehearsals in 2009. Ian danced with Natalie Lowe in Series 7, as his professional partner, Camilla Dallerup, no longer appeared on Strictly Come Dancing.
- In series 8 Ian Waite did not have a celebrity partner to teach but appeared in the newly formed dance troupe, the Strictly Showdancers, and choreographed several of their routines. He returned to the Saturday night show on 23 October 2010 when he partnered Michelle Williams whilst Brendan Cole was unable to do so, and appeared regularly on Strictly Come Dancing: It Takes Two using a telestrator to illustrate his critiques of contestants' rehearsals.

Waite has also appeared in three Strictly Come Dancing tours, reprising his partnerships with Zoë Ball in 2008, and with Jodie Kidd in 2009. In the 2010 tour Ian Waite appeared with Natalie Lowe in a showdance. In the 2011 tour he took on the role of the choreographer for all the Pro and Pro/Celeb group dances. He has also appeared in Strictly Come Dancing Christmas specials, with his best performances being runner-up with Denise Lewis in 2004 and Zoë Ball in 2006.

Dance	Partner	Highest	Partner	Lowest
American smooth				

== Dancing with the Stars ==
In 2023, Waite joined the cast of the twentieth season of the Australian franchise of Dancing with the Stars. Waite and his celebrity partner Virginia Gay consistently scored the highest score of the week, and achieved a perfect 40 with their foxtrot on the second night of the semi finals, but did not receive enough votes for their freestyle routine from the studio audience to win the final.

== Dance tours and other professional engagements ==
In September 2024, Waite announced he would be teaching & performing at Donahey's Dancing with The Stars Weekends in 2025.

In August 2017, Waite & Oti Mabuse announced a 60 date 2018 UK Tour An Audience With.

== Personal life ==
In the first episode of It Takes Two in 2017, it was announced that Waite had married his boyfriend Drew Merriman earlier that year on 22 July.
