= Darren Bennett (dancer) =

English professional dancer

- Born: Darren Lee Bennett; 14 February 1977 (age 49); Sheffield, South Yorkshire, England
- Occupation: Dancer
- Spouse: Lilia Kopylova (1999–present)

Darren Lee Bennett (born 14 February 1977) is an English professional dancer. With his wife Lilia Kopylova he has a successful career in professional Latin dancing, competing nationally and internationally. Darren's favourite dances are the Samba and the Foxtrot. They teach private lessons in their own studio at Sheffield, England.

Bennett was born in Sheffield. He first met Kopylova after his twin brother Dale, also a dancer, introduced them. In November 2005 Bennett and Kopylova won the British Championships for Professional Latin, coming first in all five dances. In November 2006 they successfully defended this title against a challenge from Olga Rodionova and Paul Richardson, who had been competing for the USA but had recently registered as a British couple. Bennett and Kopylova triumphed winning all five dances to retain the title.

In February 2008, Bennett and Kopylova were winners of the Carl Alan Award for Ballroom, Latin and Sequence (performers)- a prestigious title described by the IDTA as 'the Oscars of the world of dance'.

The couple starred in a West End dance show, Latin Fever, which they choreographed themselves, as well as choosing the music and costumes to reflect the mood of each Latin dance.

Bennett is a consultant creative producer for the Dancing with the Stars (Irish Edition) TV show working alongside his wife and choreographer Lilia Kopylova.

== Strictly Come Dancing ==
He was one of the professional dancers on the BBC dancing television programme, Strictly Come Dancing. This is a summary of how well he has done in the show:

- Series Two: Won with his partner, actress Jill Halfpenny.
- Christmas Special: Won with his partner from series two, Jill Halfpenny.
- Series Three: Knocked out in the third week with his partner, TV presenter Gloria Hunniford.
- Series Four: Knocked out in the semi-final after competing with singer Emma Bunton. They also competed together in the 2006 Christmas Special, finished in third place overall (the remaining couples were not ranked).
- Series Five: Knocked out in the quarter-final (fourth place) after competing with actress Letitia Dean. They also competed together in the 2007 Christmas Special, but were not placed in the final two overall (the remaining couples were not ranked).
- Live Tour 2008: Competing at a series of venues during January and February 2008 with Series Five partner Letitia Dean, they won once (31 January 2008), and were runners up on two further occasions. The tour was based on a similar format to the main series, with each couple performing two routines which were marked by the judges, and the audience being invited to vote for their favourite.
- Series Six: Knocked out in the fourth week, dancing with EastEnders' Jessie Wallace. Won the 2008 Christmas Special with Jill Halfpenny, meaning they became two of the select few couples to win the Christmas Special twice.
- On the 2009 Strictly Come Dancing Tour Darren was re-united with his Series 2 partner and champion Jill Halfpenny.
- Series Seven: Knocked out in the fourth week, dancing with Actress and Loose Women presenter Lynda Bellingham

=== Highest- and lowest-scoring performances per dance ===
| Dance | Partner | Highest | Partner | Lowest |
|---|---|---|---|---|
| American Smooth | Emma Bunton | 34 | Letitia Dean | 31 |
| Argentine Tango | Emma Bunton | 36 | | |
| Cha Cha Cha | Jill Halfpenny | 36 | Lynda Bellingham | 23 |
| Foxtrot | Emma Bunton; Letitia Dean | 34 | Lynda Bellingham | 24 |
| Jive | Jill Halfpenny | 40 | Gloria Hunniford | 19 |
| Paso Doble | Jill Halfpenny; Emma Bunton | 37 | Lynda Bellingham | 25 |
| Quickstep | Emma Bunton | 33 | Jessie Wallace | 19 |
| Rumba | Emma Bunton | 34 | Gloria Hunniford | 17 |
| Salsa | Emma Bunton | 33 | Jessie Wallace | 20 |
| Samba | Emma Bunton | 36 | Jill Halfpenny | 35 |
| Tango | Emma Bunton | 35 | Lynda Bellingham | 21 |
| Viennese Waltz | Emma Bunton | 34 | Letitia Dean | 32 |
| Waltz | Emma Bunton | 37 | Gloria Hunniford | 22 |

=== Performances ===
| Year | Celebrity partner | Week # | Dance | Judges' scores | | | | |
| Year | Celebrity partner | Week # | Dance | Horwood | Phillips | Goodman | Tonioli | Total |
|---|---|---|---|---|---|---|---|---|
| 2004 | Jill Halfpenny | 1 | Waltz | 6 | 7 | 7 | 7 | 27 |
| 2004 | Jill Halfpenny | 2 | Rumba | 8 | 8 | 8 | 8 | 32 |
| 2004 | Jill Halfpenny | 3 | Jive | 8 | 9 | 9 | 9 | 35 |
| 2004 | Jill Halfpenny | 4 | Foxtrot | 8 | 9 | 9 | 8 | 34 |
| 2004 | Jill Halfpenny | 5 | Samba | 8 | 9 | 9 | 9 | 35 |
| 2004 | Jill Halfpenny | 6 | Quickstep | 8 | 8 | 8 | 8 | 32 |
| 2004 | Jill Halfpenny | 6 | Cha-Cha-Cha | 9 | 9 | 9 | 9 | 36 |
| 2004 | Jill Halfpenny | 7 (semi-final) | Tango | 7 | 8 | 7 | 7 | 29 |
| 2004 | Jill Halfpenny | 7 (semi-final) | Paso Doble | 9 | 10 | 9 | 9 | 37 |
| 2004 | Jill Halfpenny | 8 (final) (Winner) | Foxtrot | 9 | 8 | 9 | 8 | 34 |
| 2004 | Jill Halfpenny | 8 (final) (Winner) | Jive | 10 | 10 | 10 | 10 | 40 |
| 2005 | Gloria Hunniford | 1 | Waltz | 4 | 5 | 7 | 6 | 22 |
| 2005 | Gloria Hunniford | 2 | Rumba | 2 | 4 | 5 | 6 | 17 |
| 2005 | Gloria Hunniford | 3 | Jive | 3 | 4 | 6 | 6 | 19 |
| 2006 | Emma Bunton | 2 | Quickstep | 8 | 8 | 8 | 9 | 33 |
| 2006 | Emma Bunton | 3 | Jive | 8 | 8 | 8 | 9 | 33 |
| 2006 | Emma Bunton | 4 | Foxtrot | 8 | 7 | 7 | 8 | 30 |
| 2006 | Emma Bunton | 5 | Viennese Waltz | 8 | 9 | 8 | 9 | 34 |
| 2006 | Emma Bunton | 6 | Samba | 9 | 9 | 9 | 9 | 36 |
| 2006 | Emma Bunton | 7 | Cha-Cha-Cha | 7 | 7 | 7 | 9 | 30 |
| 2006 | Emma Bunton | 8 | American Smooth | 8 | 8 | 9 | 9 | 34 |
| 2006 | Emma Bunton | 9 | Waltz | 9 | 8 | 10 | 10 | 37 |
| 2006 | Emma Bunton | 9 | Paso Doble | 9 | 9 | 9 | 10 | 37 |
| 2006 | Emma Bunton | 10 (semi-final) | Tango | 9 | 8 | 9 | 9 | 35 |
| 2006 | Emma Bunton | 10 (semi-final) | Rumba | 8 | 8 | 9 | 9 | 34 |
| 2006 | Emma Bunton | 11 (final) (3rd place) | Argentine Tango | 9 | 9 | 9 | 9 | 36 |
| 2006 | Emma Bunton | 11 (final) (3rd place) | Salsa | 8 | 7 | 9 | 9 | 33 |
| 2007 | Letitia Dean | 2 | Rumba | 4 | 6 | 7 | 6 | 23 |
| 2007 | Letitia Dean | 3 | Tango | 6 | 7 | 7 | 7 | 27 |
| 2007 | Letitia Dean | 4 | American Smooth | 7 | 8 | 8 | 8 | 31 |
| 2007 | Letitia Dean | 5 | Paso Doble | 7 | 8 | 8 | 8 | 31 |
| 2007 | Letitia Dean | 6 | Salsa | 6 | 6 | 7 | 6 | 25 |
| 2007 | Letitia Dean | 7 | Foxtrot | 8 | 8 | 9 | 9 | 34 |
| 2007 | Letitia Dean | 8 | Viennese Waltz | 8 | 8 | 7 | 9 | 32 |
| 2007 | Letitia Dean | 9 | Quickstep | 7 | 7 | 8 | 8 | 30 |
| 2007 | Letitia Dean | 9 | Cha-Cha-Cha | 6 | 6 | 7 | 7 | 26 |
| 2007 | Letitia Dean | 10 | Waltz | 8 | 9 | 9 | 9 | 35 |
| 2007 | Letitia Dean | 10 | Jive | 7 | 7 | 8 | 8 | 30 |
| 2008 | Jessie Wallace | 2 | Salsa | 4 | 4 | 6 | 6 | 20 |
| 2008 | Jessie Wallace | 4 | Quickstep | 3 | 5 | 5 | 6 | 19 |
| Year | Celebrity partner | Week # | Dance | Judges' scores | | | | |
| Year | Celebrity partner | Week # | Dance | Craig Revel Horwood | Len Goodman | Alesha Dixon | Bruno Tonioli | Total |
| 2009 | Lynda Bellingham | 1 | Tango | 3 | 6 | 7 | 5 | 21 |
| 2009 | Lynda Bellingham | 1 | Cha-Cha-Cha | 5 | 6 | 6 | 6 | 23 |
| 2009 | Lynda Bellingham | 3 | Paso Doble | 5 | 7 | 7 | 6 | 25 |
| 2009 | Lynda Bellingham | 4 | Foxtrot | 5 | 7 | 6 | 6 | 24 |

== Other work ==
Darren along with wife Lilia have been heavily involved in the "Essentially Dance" scheme, with the intention to give all children within the UK a chance to experience ballroom and Latin dance, the scheme is funded by the Aldridge Foundation and was officially launched on 22 June 2009.

Darren joined the judging panel of the Lebanese edition of Dancing With The Stars for its first series in December 2012 and second series in November 2013 and third series in March 2015 and fourth series in November 2016.
