= List of Strictly Come Dancing contestants =

The following is a list of Strictly Come Dancing contestants to date along with their professional partners, and competition finishes.

== Professional dancers ==
Strictly Come Dancing has featured 63 professional dancers competing over the course of 23 series.

Professional dancer	Series																							
Professional dancer	1 2004	2 2004	3 2005	4 2006	5 2007	6 2008	7 2009	8 2010	9 2011	10 2012	11 2013	12 2014	13 2015	14 2016	15 2017	16 2018	17 2019	18 2020	19 2021	20 2022	21 2023	22 2024	23 2025	24 2026
Brendan Cole	●	●	●	●	●	●	●	●	●	●	●	●	●	●	●									
Anton Du Beke	●	●	●	●	●	●	●	●	●	●	●	●	●	●	●	●	●	●						
Hanna Karttunen	●																							
Kylie Jones	●																							
Paul Killick	●	●																						
John Byrnes	●																							
Camilla Dallerup	●	●	●	●	●	●																		
Erin Boag	●	●	●	●	●	●	●	●	●	●														
Nicole Cutler		●		●	●																			
Hazel Newberry		●																						
Ian Waite		●	●	●	●	●	●																	
Lilia Kopylova		●	●	●	●	●	●																	
Darren Bennett		●	●	●	●	●	●																	
Matthew Cutler			●	●	●	●	●																	
Hanna Haarala			●																					
Andrew Cuerden			●																					
Karen Hardy			●	●	●	●																		
Izabela Hannah			●																					
Flavia Cacace				●	●	●	●	●	●	●														
Ola Jordan				●	●	●	●	●	●	●	●	●												
Vincent Simone				●	●	●	●	●	●	●														
James Jordan				●	●	●	●	●	●	●	●													
Hayley Holt						●																		
Kristina Rihanoff						●	●	●	●	●	●	●	●											
Brian Fortuna						●	●																	
Aliona Vilani							●	●	●		●	●	●											
Katya Virshilas							●	●	●															
Natalie Lowe							●	●	●	●		●	●	●										
Robin Windsor								●	●	●	●													
Jared Murillo								●																
Artem Chigvintsev								●	●	●	●													
Pasha Kovalev									●	●	●	●	●	●	●	●								
Karen Hauer										●	●	●	●	●	●	●	●	●	●	●	●	●	●	
Iveta Lukošiūtė										●	●	●												
Kevin Clifton											●	●	●	●	●	●	●							
Janette Manrara											●	●	●	●	●	●	●	●						
Anya Garnis											●													
Aljaž Škorjanec											●	●	●	●	●	●	●	●	●			●	●	●
Joanne Clifton												●		●										
Trent Whiddon												●												
Tristan MacManus												●	●											
Oti Mabuse													●	●	●	●	●	●	●					
Gleb Savchenko													●											
Giovanni Pernice													●	●	●	●	●	●	●	●	●			
Oksana Platero														●										
Gorka Márquez														●	●	●		●	●	●	●	●		
Katya Jones														●	●	●	●	●	●	●	●	●	●	●
AJ Pritchard														●	●	●	●							
Amy Dowden															●	●	●	●	●	●		●	●	●
Nadiya Bychkova															●	●	●		●	●		●	●	
Dianne Buswell															●	●	●	●	●	●	●	●	●	●
Graziano Di Prima																●			●	●	●			
Neil Jones																	●		●			●		
Johannes Radebe																	●	●	●	●	●	●	●	
Luba Mushtuk																	●	●			●	●		
Nikita Kuzmin																			●	●	●	●	●	●
Nancy Xu																			●	●	●	●		●
Kai Widdrington																			●	●	●		●	●
Carlos Gu																				●	●		●	●
Jowita Przystał																				●	●	●	●	●
Vito Coppola																				●	●	●	●	●
Lauren Oakley																					●	●	●	●
Michelle Tsiakkas																						●		
Alexis Warr																							●	●
Julian Caillon																							●	●
Maddie Ingoldsby																								●
Mark Karmalita																								●

== List of contestants ==
Key:

Winners of the series
Runners-up of the series
Third place of the series
Last place of the series
Withdrew
Participating in the current series

Celebrity	Known for	Age	Professional	Series	Place	Dances	Best score	Worst score	Aggregate	Average
Jason Wood	Comedian	32	Kylie Jones	1	8th/8	2	21	19	40	20.00
David Dickinson	TV presenter	62	Camilla Dallerup	1	7th/8	3	21	16	57	19.00
Verona Joseph	Actress	30	Paul Killick	1	6th/8	4	27	24	99	24.75
Claire Sweeney	Actress & TV presenter	33	John Byrnes	1	5th/8	5	34	26	150	30.00
Martin Offiah	Rugby player	37	Erin Boag	1	4th/8	7	25	21	161	23.00
Lesley Garrett	Singer	49	Anton Du Beke	1	3rd/8	9	34	26	264	29.33
Christopher Parker	Actor	20	Hanna Karttunen	1	2nd/8	12	28	15	241	20.08
Natasha Kaplinsky	TV presenter	31	Brendan Cole	1	1st/8	12	37	26	396	33.00
Quentin Willson	TV presenter	47	Hazel Newberry	2	10th/10	1	8	8	8	8.00
Carol Vorderman	TV presenter	43	Paul Killick	2	9th/10	2	22	20	42	21.00
Esther Rantzen	TV presenter	64	Anton Du Beke	2	8th/10	3	24	16	56	18.66
Diarmuid Gavin	Garden designer	40	Nicole Cutler	2	7th/10	4	17	12	55	13.75
Sarah Manners	Actress	29	Brendan Cole	2	6th/10	5	31	23	134	26.80
Roger Black	Olympic sprinter	38	Camilla Dallerup	2	5th/10	7	29	19	165	23.57
Aled Jones	Singer & TV presenter	33	Lilia Kopylova	2	4th/10	9	32	25	256	28.44
Julian Clary	Comedian	45	Erin Boag	2	3rd/10	11	29	19	269	24.45
Denise Lewis	Olympic heptathlete	32	Ian Waite	2	2nd/10	11	38	25	359	32.64
Jill Halfpenny	Actress	29	Darren Bennett	2	1st/10	11	40	27	370	33.64
Siobhan Hayes	Actress	31	Matthew Cutler	3	12th/12	1	15	15	15	15.00
Jaye Jacobs	Actress	23	Andrew Cuerden	3	11th/12	2	25	21	46	23.00
Gloria Hunniford	TV & radio presenter	65	Darren Bennett	3	10th/12	3	22	17	58	19.33
Fiona Phillips	TV presenter	44	Brendan Cole	3	9th/12	4	20	11	60	15.00
Dennis Taylor	Snooker player	56	Izabela Hannah	3	8th/12	5	23	15	98	19.60
Will Thorp	Actor	28	Hanna Haarala	3	7th/12	6	34	18	157	26.16
Bill Turnbull	TV presenter	49	Karen Hardy	3	6th/12	7	29	17	166	23.71
Patsy Palmer	Actress	33	Anton Du Beke	3	5th/12	9	34	19	249	27.67
James Martin	Chef & TV presenter	33	Camilla Dallerup	3	4th/12	11	33	20	292	26.54
Zoe Ball	TV & radio presenter	35	Ian Waite	3	3rd/12	13	38	29	454	34.92
Colin Jackson	Olympic hurdler	38	Erin Boag	3	2nd/12	13	39	26	438	33.69
Darren Gough	Cricketer	35	Lilia Kopylova	3	1st/12	13	36	19	406	31.23
Nicholas Owen	TV presenter	59	Nicole Cutler	4	14th/14	1	14	14	14	14.00
Mica Paris	Singer & TV presenter	37	Ian Waite	4	13th/14	1	20	20	20	20.00
Jimmy Tarbuck	Comedian	66	Flavia Cacace	4	12th/14	1	17	17	17	17.00
DJ Spoony	Radio DJ	36	Ola Jordan	4	11th/14	2	27	27	54	27.00
Georgina Bouzova	Actress	27	James Jordan	4	10th/14	3	26	14	58	19.33
Jan Ravens	Comedian	48	Anton Du Beke	4	9th/14	4	25	18	91	22.75
Ray Fearon	Actor	39	Camilla Dallerup	4	8th/14	5	35	26	147	29.40
Peter Schmeichel	Footballer	43	Erin Boag	4	7th/14	6	31	19	148	24.66
Claire King	Actress	43	Brendan Cole	4	6th/14	7	32	21	174	24.86
Carol Smillie	TV presenter	44	Matthew Cutler	4	5th/14	9	34	25	265	29.44
Louisa Lytton	Actress	17	Vincent Simone	4	4th/14	11	36	26	348	31.64
Emma Bunton	Singer	30	Darren Bennett	4	3rd/14	13	37	30	442	34.00
Matt Dawson	Rugby player	34	Lilia Kopylova	4	2nd/14	16	38	19	493	30.81
Mark Ramprakash	Cricketer	37	Karen Hardy	4	1st/14	16	40	27	536	33.50
Brian Capron	Actor	60	Karen Hardy	5	14th/14	1	18	18	18	18.00
Stephanie Beacham	Actress	60	Vincent Simone	5	13th/14	1	24	24	24	24.00
Willie Thorne	Snooker player	53	Erin Boag	5	12th/14	2	24	23	47	23.50
Gabby Logan	TV presenter	34	James Jordan	5	11th/14	3	31	29	90	30.00
Dominic Littlewood	TV presenter	42	Lilia Kopylova	5	10th/14	4	26	25	101	25.25
Penny Lancaster-Stewart	Model	36	Ian Waite	5	9th/14	5	35	25	150	30.00
Kate Garraway	TV presenter	40	Anton Du Beke	5	8th/14	6	26	15	115	19.17
John Barnes	Footballer & manager	44	Nicole Cutler	5	7th/14	7	36	22	190	27.14
Kelly Brook	Model & actress	28	Brendan Cole	5	6th/14	7	36	28	231	33.00
Kenny Logan	Rugby player	35	Ola Jordan	5	5th/14	9	30	18	216	24.00
Letitia Dean	Actress	40	Darren Bennett	5	4th/14	11	35	23	324	29.45
Gethin Jones	TV presenter	29	Camilla Dallerup	5	3rd/14	13	39	22	428	32.92
Matt Di Angelo	Actor	20	Flavia Cacace	5	2nd/14	16	40	23	526	32.88
Alesha Dixon	Singer	29	Matthew Cutler	5	1st/14	16	39	31	584	36.50
Phil Daniels	Actor	50	Flavia Cacace	6	16th/16	1	20	20	20	20.00
Gillian Taylforth	Actress	53	Anton Du Beke	6	15th/16	1	22	22	22	22.00
Gary Rhodes	Chef	48	Karen Hardy	6	14th/16	2	18	17	35	17.50
Jessie Wallace	Actress	37	Darren Bennett	6	13th/16	2	20	19	39	19.50
Don Warrington	Actor	57	Lilia Kopylova	6	12th/16	3	30	19	74	24.67
Mark Foster	Olympic swimmer	38	Hayley Holt	6	11th/16	4	24	16	79	19.75
Andrew Castle	TV presenter & tennis player	45	Ola Jordan	6	10th/16	5	24	17	107	21.40
Heather Small	Singer	43	Brian Fortuna	6	9th/16	6	27	23	149	24.83
Cherie Lunghi	Actress	56	James Jordan	6	8th/16	7	36	26	227	32.43
John Sergeant	TV presenter	64	Kristina Rihanoff	6	7th/16	7	25	12	138	19.71
Jodie Kidd	Model	30	Ian Waite	6	6th/16	8	33	22	220	27.50
Christine Bleakley	TV presenter	29	Matthew Cutler	6	5th/16	10	34	22	284	28.40
Austin Healey	Rugby player	35	Erin Boag	6	4th/16	12	38	29	414	34.50
Lisa Snowdon	TV & radio presenter	36	Brendan Cole	6	3rd/16	16	40	22	557	34.81
Rachel Stevens	Singer	30	Vincent Simone	6	2nd/16	16	40	30	573	35.81
Tom Chambers	Actor	31	Camilla Dallerup	6	1st/16	16	39	28	552	34.50
Martina Hingis	Tennis player	29	Matthew Cutler	7	16th/16	2	24	22	46	23.00
Richard Dunwoody	Jockey	45	Lilia Kopylova	7	15th/16	2	19	19	38	19.00
Rav Wilding	TV presenter	32	Aliona Vilani	7	14th/16	3	22	19	61	20.33
Lynda Bellingham	Actress & TV presenter	61	Darren Bennett	7	13th/16	4	25	21	93	23.25
Joe Calzaghe	Boxer	37	Kristina Rihanoff	7	12th/16	5	21	16	92	18.40
Jo Wood	Model & entrepreneur	54	Brendan Cole	7	11th/16	6	23	14	113	18.83
Zöe Lucker	Actress	35	James Jordan	7	10th/16	7	33	30	220	31.43
Craig Kelly	Actor	39	Flavia Cacace	7	9th/16	8	24	17	168	21.00
Phil Tufnell	Cricketer	43	Katya Virshilas	7	8th/16	9	31	22	240	26.67
Jade Johnson	Olympic long jumper	29	Ian Waite	7	7th/16	8	35	25	247	30.88
Ricky Groves	Actor	41	Erin Boag	7	6th/16	10	29	21	258	25.80
Natalie Cassidy	Actress	26	Vincent Simone	7	5th/16	11	34	24	310	28.18
Laila Rouass	Actress	38	Anton Du Beke	7	4th/16	13	34	21	362	27.85
Ali Bastian	Actress	27	Brian Fortuna	7	3rd/16	15	40	29	512	34.13
Ricky Whittle	Actor	29	Natalie Lowe	7	2nd/16	19	40	31	682	35.89
Chris Hollins	TV presenter	38	Ola Jordan	7	1st/16	19	40	22	589	31.00
Goldie	Musician	45	Kristina Rihanoff	8	14th/14	2	26	20	46	23.00
Paul Daniels	Magician	72	Ola Jordan	8	13th/14	3	21	16	53	17.67
Peter Shilton	Footballer	61	Erin Boag	8	12th/14	4	26	17	81	20.25
Tina O'Brien	Actress	27	Jared Murillo	8	11th/14	4	29	24	107	26.75
Jimi Mistry	Actor	37	Flavia Cacace	8	10th/14	6	32	25	170	28.33
Michelle Williams	Singer	31	Brendan Cole (Note: Danced with Ian Waite in Week 4 due to bereavement.)	8	9th/14	7	30	24	184	26.29
Felicity Kendal	Actress	64	Vincent Simone	8	8th/14	8	30	23	217	27.13
Patsy Kensit	Actress	42	Robin Windsor	8	7th/14	9	32	22	252	28.00
Ann Widdecombe	Politician	63	Anton Du Beke	8	6th/14	10	21	12	162	16.20
Gavin Henson	Rugby player	28	Katya Virshilas	8	5th/14	12	33	19	320	26.67
Scott Maslen	Actor	39	Natalie Lowe	8	4th/14	12	39	28	402	33.50
Pamela Stephenson	Comedian & psychologist	61	James Jordan	8	3rd/14	14	40	27	491	35.07
Matt Baker	TV presenter	32	Aliona Vilani	8	2nd/14	16	38	28	548	34.25
Kara Tointon	Actress	27	Artem Chigvintsev	8	1st/14	16	39	30	571	35.69
Edwina Currie	Politician	64	Vincent Simone	9	14th/14	2	19	17	36	18.00
Dan Lobb	TV presenter & tennis player	39	Katya Virshilas	9	13th/14	3	24	21	69	23.00
Rory Bremner	Comedian	50	Erin Boag	9	12th/14	4	31	22	104	26.00
Nancy Dell'Olio	Media personality	50	Anton Du Beke	9	11th/14	5	20	12	78	15.60
Lulu	Singer	63	Brendan Cole	9	10th/14	6	29	17	149	24.83
Audley Harrison	Boxer	41	Natalie Lowe	9	9th/14	7	27	20	159	22.71
Russell Grant	Astrologer & TV presenter	60	Flavia Cacace	9	8th/14	8	28	21	194	24.25
Anita Dobson	Actress	62	Robin Windsor (Note: Danced with Brendan Cole in Week 9 owing to injury.)	9	7th/14	9	33	27	267	29.67
Robbie Savage	Footballer	37	Ola Jordan	9	6th/14	10	31	19	272	27.20
Alex Jones	TV presenter	34	James Jordan	9	5th/14	12	35	22	364	30.33
Holly Valance	Singer & actress	28	Artem Chigvintsev (Note: Danced with Brendan Cole in Week 7 owing to injury.)	9	4th/14	12	38	28	394	32.83
Jason Donovan	Singer & actor	43	Kristina Rihanoff	9	3rd/14	14	40	27	487	34.79
Chelsee Healey	Actress	23	Pasha Kovalev	9	2nd/14	16	40	27	564	35.25
Harry Judd	Musician	25	Aliona Vilani	9	1st/14	16	40	27	570	35.63
Johnny Ball	TV presenter	74	Iveta Lukosiute (Note: Iveta Lukosiute was a replacement after his original partner, Aliona Vilani, was injured in training.)	10	14th/14	2	20	17	37	18.50
Jerry Hall	Model & actress	56	Anton Du Beke	10	13th/14	3	18	18	54	18.00
Sid Owen	Actor & singer	40	Ola Jordan	10	12th/14	4	26	17	82	20.50
Colin Salmon	Actor	50	Kristina Rihanoff	10	11th/14	5	27	23	124	24.80
Fern Britton	TV presenter	55	Artem Chigvintsev	10	10th/14	6	27	19	138	23.00
Richard Arnold	TV presenter	42	Erin Boag	10	9th/14	7	29	17	158	22.57
Victoria Pendleton	Olympic cyclist	32	Brendan Cole	10	8th/14	8	31	16	193	24.13
Michael Vaughan	Cricketer	38	Natalie Lowe	10	7th/14	9	35	15	227	25.22
Nicky Byrne	Singer	34	Karen Hauer	10	6th/14	10	36	17	266	26.60
Lisa Riley	Actress & TV presenter	36	Robin Windsor	10	5th/14	12	32	25	352	29.33
Dani Harmer	Actress	23	Vincent Simone	10	4th/14	14	38	21	458	32.71
Denise van Outen	Actress & TV presenter	38	James Jordan	10	=2nd/14	15	40	25	527	35.13
Kimberley Walsh	Singer & actress	31	Pasha Kovalev	10	=2nd/14	15	40	26	519	34.60
Louis Smith	Olympic gymnast	23	Flavia Cacace	10	1st/14	15	40	27	502	33.46
Tony Jacklin	Golfer	69	Aliona Vilani	11	15th/15	2	16	13	29	14.50
Vanessa Feltz	TV & radio presenter	51	James Jordan	11	14th/15	3	23	19	62	20.66
Julien Macdonald	Fashion designer	42	Janette Manrara	11	13th/15	4	23	18	83	20.75
Deborah Meaden	Businesswoman & TV personality	54	Robin Windsor	11	12th/15	5	28	23	126	25.20
Rachel Riley	TV presenter	27	Pasha Kovalev	11	11th/15	6	30	20	152	25.33
Dave Myers	Chef & TV presenter	55	Karen Hauer	11	10th/15	7	23	16	128	18.29
Fiona Fullerton	Actress	57	Anton Du Beke	11	9th/15	8	30	22	209	26.13
Ben Cohen	Rugby player	35	Kristina Rihanoff	11	8th/15	9	32	19	247	27.44
Mark Benton	Actor	48	Iveta Lukosiute	11	7th/15	10	29	22	260	26.00
Ashley Taylor Dawson	Actor & singer	31	Ola Jordan	11	6th/15	11	35	25	358	32.54
Patrick Robinson	Actor	50	Anya Garnis	11	5th/15	13	38	27	424	32.61
Sophie Ellis-Bextor	Singer	34	Brendan Cole	11	4th/15	15	39	28	500	33.33
Natalie Gumede	Actress	29	Artem Chigvintsev	11	=2nd/15	15	40	31	553	36.87
Susanna Reid	TV presenter	43	Kevin Clifton	11	=2nd/15	16	39	28	541	33.81
Abbey Clancy	Model & TV presenter	27	Aljaž Škorjanec	11	1st/15	16	40	28	570	35.63
Gregg Wallace	Chef & TV presenter	49	Aliona Vilani	12	15th/15	2	18	18	36	18.00
Jennifer Gibney	Actress	50	Tristan MacManus	12	14th/15	3	19	18	55	18.33
Tim Wonnacott	TV presenter	63	Natalie Lowe	12	13th/15	4	23	17	77	19.25
Thom Evans	Rugby player & model	29	Iveta Lukosiute	12	12th/15	5	31	23	136	27.20
Scott Mills	Radio DJ	40	Joanne Clifton	12	11th/15	6	21	15	109	18.17
Alison Hammond	TV presenter	39	Aljaž Škorjanec	12	10th/15	7	27	21	172	24.57
Judy Murray	Tennis coach	55	Anton Du Beke	12	9th/15	8	24	17	155	19.38
Steve Backshall	TV presenter & naturalist	41	Ola Jordan	12	8th/15	9	31	21	240	26.67
Sunetra Sarker	Actress	41	Brendan Cole	12	7th/15	10	32	24	284	28.40
Pixie Lott	Singer	23	Trent Whiddon	12	6th/15	11	38	27	380	34.55
Jake Wood	Actor	42	Janette Manrara	12	5th/15	13	38	27	417	32.07
Mark Wright	TV personality	27	Karen Hauer	12	4th/15	15	36	24	476	31.73
Frankie Bridge	Singer	25	Kevin Clifton	12	=2nd/15	16	39	30	561	35.06
Simon Webbe	Singer	36	Kristina Rihanoff	12	=2nd/15	16	40	23	530	33.13
Caroline Flack	TV presenter	35	Pasha Kovalev	12	1st/15	16	40	27	562	35.13
Iwan Thomas	Olympic sprinter	41	Ola Jordan	13	15th/15	2	17	13	30	15.00
Anthony Ogogo	Boxer	26	Oti Mabuse	13	14th/15	3	21	19	59	19.67
Daniel O'Donnell	Singer	53	Kristina Rihanoff	13	13th/15	4	24	21	91	22.75
Ainsley Harriott	Chef & TV presenter	58	Natalie Lowe	13	12th/15	5	26	20	113	22.60
Kirsty Gallacher	TV presenter	39	Brendan Cole	13	11th/15	6	29	17	130	21.67
Carol Kirkwood	TV presenter	53	Pasha Kovalev	13	10th/15	7	22	13	126	18.00
Jeremy Vine	TV & radio presenter	50	Karen Clifton	13	9th/15	8	24	17	162	20.25
Jamelia	Singer & TV presenter	34	Tristan MacManus	13	8th/15	9	32	21	236	26.22
Peter Andre	Singer & TV personality	42	Janette Manrara	13	7th/15	10	38	28	309	30.90
Helen George	Actress	31	Aljaž Škorjanec	13	6th/15	11	39	29	363	33.00
Anita Rani	TV presenter	38	Gleb Savchenko	13	5th/15	13	37	27	400	30.77
Katie Derham	TV & radio presenter	45	Anton Du Beke	13	4th/15	15	35	20	426	28.40
Georgia May Foote	Actress	24	Giovanni Pernice	13	=2nd/15	16	40	25	540	33.75
Kellie Bright	Actress	39	Kevin Clifton	13	=2nd/15	16	40	27	545	34.06
Jay McGuiness	Singer	25	Aliona Vilani	13	1st/15	16	39	25	545	34.06
Melvin Odoom	TV & radio presenter	36	Janette Manrara	14	15th/15	2	23	22	45	22.50
Tameka Empson	Actress	39	Gorka Márquez	14	14th/15	3	29	26	83	27.67
Will Young	Singer	37	Karen Clifton	14	13th/15	3	31	27	88	29.33
Naga Munchetty	TV presenter	41	Pasha Kovalev	14	12th/15	4	25	23	95	23.75
Lesley Joseph	Actress	71	Anton Du Beke	14	11th/15	5	31	23	131	26.20
Anastacia	Singer	48	Brendan Cole (Note: Danced with Gorka Márquez in Week 5 owing to illness.)	14	10th/15	6	30	22	159	26.50
Laura Whitmore	TV presenter	31	Giovanni Pernice	14	9th/15	6	36	25	188	31.33
Daisy Lowe	Model	27	Aljaž Škorjanec	14	8th/15	8	34	30	254	31.75
Greg Rutherford	Olympic long jumper	30	Natalie Lowe	14	7th/15	9	32	24	258	28.67
Ed Balls	Politician	49	Katya Jones	14	6th/15	10	27	16	226	22.60
Judge Rinder	Barrister & TV personality	38	Oksana Platero	14	5th/15	11	33	25	326	29.64
Claudia Fragapane	Olympic gymnast	19	AJ Pritchard	14	4th/15	13	38	26	441	33.92
Danny Mac	Actor	28	Oti Mabuse	14	=2nd/15	16	40	30	586	36.63
Louise Redknapp	Singer & TV presenter	42	Kevin Clifton	14	=2nd/15	16	40	31	574	35.88
Ore Oduba	TV presenter	31	Joanne Clifton	14	1st/15	16	40	27	571	35.69
Chizzy Akudolu	Actress	43	Pasha Kovalev	15	15th/15	2	21	16	37	18.50
Rev. Richard Coles	TV presenter & musician	55	Dianne Buswell	15	14th/15	3	17	14	48	16.00
Charlotte Hawkins	TV presenter	42	Brendan Cole	15	13th/15	4	22	12	70	17.50
Brian Conley	Comedian	56	Amy Dowden	15	12th/15	5	22	16	99	19.80
Simon Rimmer	Chef & TV presenter	54	Karen Clifton	15	11th/15	6	21	16	111	18.50
Aston Merrygold	Singer	29	Janette Manrara	15	10th/15	7	38	25	225	32.14
Ruth Langsford	TV presenter	57	Anton Du Beke	15	9th/15	8	24	15	158	19.75
Jonnie Peacock	Paralympic sprinter	24	Oti Mabuse	15	8th/15	9	32	20	232	25.78
Susan Calman	Comedian	43	Kevin Clifton	15	7th/15	10	30	18	233	23.30
Davood Ghadami	Actor	35	Nadiya Bychkova	15	6th/15	11	38	25	334	30.36
Mollie King	Singer	30	AJ Pritchard	15	5th/15	13	32	22	360	27.69
Alexandra Burke	Singer	29	Gorka Márquez	15	=2nd/15	16	40	24	583	36.44
Debbie McGee	TV personality	59	Giovanni Pernice	15	=2nd/15	16	40	27	567	35.44
Gemma Atkinson	Actress	33	Aljaž Škorjanec	15	=2nd/15	16	39	20	496	31.00
Joe McFadden	Actor	42	Katya Jones	15	1st/15	16	40	22	540	33.75
Susannah Constantine	TV presenter	56	Anton Du Beke	16	15th/15	2	12	12	24	12.00
Lee Ryan	Singer & actor	35	Nadiya Bychkova	16	14th/15	3	26	19	67	22.33
Katie Piper	TV presenter	35	Gorka Márquez	16	13th/15	4	22	13	70	17.50
Vick Hope	Radio DJ	29	Graziano Di Prima	16	12th/15	5	29	18	121	24.20
Seann Walsh	Comedian	32	Katya Jones	16	11th/15	6	30	15	135	22.50
Dr. Ranj Singh	TV presenter	39	Janette Manrara	16	10th/15	7	27	20	170	24.29
Danny John-Jules	Actor	58	Amy Dowden	16	9th/15	8	37	22	226	28.25
Kate Silverton	TV presenter	48	Aljaž Škorjanec	16	8th/15	9	30	20	225	25.00
Graeme Swann	Cricketer	39	Oti Mabuse	16	7th/15	10	32	15	260	26.00
Charles Venn	Actor	45	Karen Clifton	16	6th/15	11	38	25	327	29.73
Lauren Steadman	Paratriathlete	25	AJ Pritchard	16	5th/15	13	35	20	347	26.69
Ashley Roberts	Singer	37	Pasha Kovalev	16	=2nd/15	16	40	29	591	36.94
Faye Tozer	Singer	43	Giovanni Pernice	16	=2nd/15	16	40	29	584	36.50
Joe Sugg	Internet personality	27	Dianne Buswell	16	=2nd/15	16	39	26	524	32.75
Stacey Dooley	TV presenter	31	Kevin Clifton	16	1st/15	16	39	20	544	34.00
James Cracknell	Olympic rower	47	Luba Mushtuk	17	15th/15	2	13	11	24	12.00
Anneka Rice	TV & radio presenter	61	Kevin Clifton	17	14th/15	3	19	11	44	14.67
Dev Griffin	Radio DJ	34	Dianne Buswell	17	13th/15	4	36	27	120	30.00
David James	Footballer	49	Nadiya Bychkova	17	12th/15	5	28	10	87	17.40
Catherine Tyldesley	Actress	36	Johannes Radebe	17	11th/15	6	32	19	153	25.50
Will Bayley	Paralympic table tennis player	31	Janette Manrara	17	10th/15	5	32	23	129	25.80
Emma Weymouth	Model	33	Aljaž Škorjanec	17	9th/15	7	36	19	189	27.00
Mike Bushell	TV presenter	53	Katya Jones	17	8th/15	8	32	14	188	23.50
Michelle Visage	TV personality	51	Giovanni Pernice	17	7th/15	9	39	29	298	33.11
Saffron Barker	Internet personality	19	AJ Pritchard	17	6th/15	10	39	23	309	30.90
Alex Scott	Footballer	35	Neil Jones (Note: Danced with Kevin Clifton in Weeks 6 & 7 owing to injury.)	17	5th/15	11	34	21	305	27.73
Chris Ramsey	Comedian	33	Karen Hauer	17	4th/15	13	34	13	341	26.23
Emma Barton	Actress	42	Anton Du Beke	17	=2nd/15	16	39	22	506	31.63
Karim Zeroual	TV presenter & actor	26	Amy Dowden	17	=2nd/15	16	40	26	571	35.69
Kelvin Fletcher	Actor	35	Oti Mabuse	17	1st/15	16	40	28	583	36.44
Jacqui Smith	Politician	57	Anton Du Beke	18	12th/12	2	17	16	33	16.50
Jason Bell	American football player	42	Luba Mushtuk	18	11th/12	3	24	16	61	20.33
Nicola Adams	Boxer	38	Katya Jones	18	10th/12	3	32	25	85	28.33
Max George	Singer	32	Dianne Buswell	18	9th/12	4	32	23	109	27.25
Caroline Quentin	Actress & TV presenter	60	Johannes Radebe	18	8th/12	5	32	28	145	29.00
Clara Amfo	Radio DJ	36	Aljaž Škorjanec	18	7th/12	6	39	23	162	27.00
JJ Chalmers	TV presenter	33	Amy Dowden	18	6th/12	7	33	23	196	28.00
Ranvir Singh	TV presenter	43	Giovanni Pernice	18	5th/12	9	36	24	282	31.33
HRVY	Singer & TV presenter	21	Janette Manrara	18	=2nd/12	12	40	28	432	36.00
Jamie Laing (Note: Originally scheduled to take part in the seventeenth series, but withdrew before the competition began due to injury; Kelvin Fletcher was his replacement.)	TV personality	32	Karen Hauer	18	=2nd/12	12	39	19	386	32.17
Maisie Smith	Actress	19	Gorka Márquez	18	=2nd/12	12	40	32	438	36.50
Bill Bailey	Comedian	55	Oti Mabuse	18	1st/12	12	40	20	402	33.50
Nina Wadia	Actress	52	Neil Jones	19	15th/15	2	24	18	42	21.00
Katie McGlynn	Actress	28	Gorka Márquez	19	14th/15	3	24	21	67	22.33
Robert Webb	Comedian	49	Dianne Buswell	19	13th/15	3	27	20	72	24.00
Greg Wise	Actor	55	Karen Hauer	19	12th/15	4	26	19	92	23.00
Ugo Monye	Rugby player	38	Oti Mabuse	19	11th/15	4	31	18	94	23.50
Judi Love	Comedian	41	Graziano Di Prima	19	10th/15	5	25	24	122	24.40
Adam Peaty	Olympic swimmer	26	Katya Jones	19	9th/15	7	32	19	186	26.57
Sara Davies	Businesswoman & TV personality	37	Aljaž Škorjanec	19	8th/15	8	36	17	228	28.50
Tom Fletcher	Musician	36	Amy Dowden	19	7th/15	8	38	21	244	30.50
Tilly Ramsay	Chef & TV presenter	20	Nikita Kuzmin	19	6th/15	10	40	21	315	31.50
Dan Walker	TV presenter	44	Nadiya Bychkova	19	5th/15	11	31	21	302	27.45
Rhys Stephenson	TV presenter	28	Nancy Xu	19	4th/15	13	40	27	444	34.15
AJ Odudu	TV presenter	33	Kai Widdrington	19	3rd/15	13	40	28	450	34.62
John Whaite	Chef & TV presenter	32	Johannes Radebe	19	2nd/15	16	40	29	573	35.81
Rose Ayling-Ellis	Actress	27	Giovanni Pernice	19	1st/15	16	40	22	566	35.38
Kaye Adams	TV presenter	59	Kai Widdrington	20	15th/15	2	22	21	43	21.50
Richie Anderson	TV & radio presenter	34	Giovanni Pernice	20	14th/15	3	32	23	82	27.33
Matt Goss	Singer	54	Nadiya Bychkova	20	13th/15	4	22	20	83	20.75
Jayde Adams	Comedian	37	Karen Hauer	20	12th/15	5	31	23	137	27.40
James Bye	Actor	38	Amy Dowden	20	11th/15	6	32	22	153	25.50
Ellie Simmonds	Paralympic swimmer	27	Nikita Kuzmin	20	10th/15	7	33	26	205	29.29
Tony Adams (Note: Performed in the live show in Week 8, but withdrew from the dance-off due to injury.)	Footballer & manager	56	Katya Jones	20	9th/15	8	31	15	176	22.00
Tyler West	Radio DJ	26	Dianne Buswell	20	8th/15	9	38	22	290	32.22
Ellie Taylor	Comedian	39	Johannes Radebe	20	7th/15	10	35	21	275	27.50
Kym Marsh	Actress & TV presenter	46	Graziano Di Prima	20	6th/15	10	37	23	311	31.10
Will Mellor	Actor	46	Nancy Xu	20	5th/15	13	39	23	433	33.31
Fleur East	Singer & radio presenter	35	Vito Coppola	20	=2nd/15	16	40	28	568	35.50
Helen Skelton	TV presenter	39	Gorka Márquez	20	=2nd/15	16	40	26	544	34.00
Molly Rainford	Actress & singer	22	Carlos Gu	20	=2nd/15	16	39	30	567	35.44
Hamza Yassin	TV presenter & naturalist	32	Jowita Przystał	20	1st/15	16	40	24	566	35.38
Les Dennis	Comedian & TV presenter	69	Nancy Xu	21	15th/15	2	16	15	31	15.50
Nikita Kanda	TV & radio presenter	28	Gorka Márquez	21	14th/15	3	21	18	57	19.00
Jody Cundy	Paralympic cyclist & swimmer	45	Jowita Przystał	21	13th/15	4	21	16	76	19.00
Eddie Kadi	Comedian	40	Karen Hauer	21	12th/15	5	34	21	125	25.00
Amanda Abbington	Actress	51	Giovanni Pernice	21	11th/15	4	32	29	122	30.50
Zara McDermott	TV personality	26	Graziano Di Prima	21	10th/15	6	28	19	148	24.67
Adam Thomas	Actor	35	Luba Mushtuk	21	9th/15	7	32	19	191	27.29
Krishnan Guru-Murthy	TV presenter	53	Lauren Oakley	21	8th/15	8	30	20	211	26.38
Angela Rippon	TV presenter	79	Kai Widdrington	21	7th/15	9	34	26	271	30.11
Angela Scanlon	TV presenter	39	Carlos Gu	21	6th/15	10	38	23	305	30.50
Nigel Harman	Actor	50	Katya Jones	21	5th/15	10	34	25	307	30.70
Annabel Croft	Tennis player & TV presenter	57	Johannes Radebe	21	4th/15	13	36	22	400	30.77
Bobby Brazier	Actor & model	20	Dianne Buswell	21	=2nd/15	16	39	29	540	33.75
Layton Williams	Actor	29	Nikita Kuzmin	21	=2nd/15	16	40	28	588	36.75
Ellie Leach	Actress	22	Vito Coppola	21	1st/15	16	40	28	574	35.88
Tom Dean	Olympic swimmer	24	Nadiya Bychkova	22	15th/15	2	23	20	43	21.50
Toyah Willcox	Singer	66	Neil Jones	22	14th/15	3	18	12	45	15.00
Nick Knowles	TV presenter	62	Luba Mushtuk	22	13th/15	3	21	18	60	20.00
Paul Merson	Footballer	56	Karen Hauer	22	12th/15	5	23	15	93	18.60
Dr. Punam Krishan	TV presenter	41	Gorka Márquez	22	11th/15	6	33	18	137	22.83
Sam Quek	Olympic hockey player & TV presenter	36	Nikita Kuzmin	22	10th/15	7	31	22	189	27.00
Shayne Ward	Singer & actor	40	Nancy Xu	22	9th/15	8	35	21	242	30.25
Wynne Evans	Singer & radio presenter	52	Katya Jones	22	8th/15	9	34	26	277	30.77
Jamie Borthwick	Actor	30	Michelle Tsiakkas	22	7th/15	10	39	23	317	31.70
Montell Douglas	Olympic sprinter & bobsledder	38	Johannes Radebe	22	6th/15	11	39	26	366	33.27
Pete Wicks	TV personality	36	Jowita Przystał	22	5th/15	13	36	17	352	27.08
JB Gill	Singer & TV presenter	38	Amy Dowden; Lauren Oakley	22	=2nd/15	16	40	27	569	35.56
Sarah Hadland	Actress	53	Vito Coppola	22	=2nd/15	16	40	27	565	35.31
Tasha Ghouri	TV personality	26	Aljaž Škorjanec	22	=2nd/15	16	40	30	596	37.25
Chris McCausland	Comedian	47	Dianne Buswell	22	1st/15	16	40	23	522	32.63
Thomas Skinner	Businessman & TV personality	34	Amy Dowden	23	15th/15	2	16	13	29	14.50
Ross King	TV presenter	63	Jowita Przystał	23	14th/15	3	19	10	44	14.67
Chris Robshaw	Rugby player	39	Nadiya Bychkova	23	13th/15	4	24	14	76	19.00
Stefan Dennis	Actor & singer	66	Dianne Buswell	23	12th/15	3	26	17	65	21.67
Jimmy Floyd Hasselbaink	Footballer & manager	53	Lauren Oakley	23	11th/15	5	30	25	139	27.80
Ellie Goldstein	Model	23	Vito Coppola	23	10th/15	6	31	17	153	25.50
Harry Aikines-Aryeetey	Olympic sprinter	37	Karen Hauer	23	9th/15	7	32	19	189	27.00
Vicky Pattison	TV personality	37	Kai Widdrington	23	8th/15	8	39	23	231	28.88
La Voix	Drag queen & TV personality	45	Aljaž Škorjanec	23	7th/15	8	35	14	210	26.25
Alex Kingston	Actress	62	Johannes Radebe	23	6th/15	10	36	21	308	30.80
Lewis Cope	Actor	30	Katya Jones	23	5th/15	11	40	27	383	34.82
Balvinder Sopal	Actress	46	Julian Caillon	23	4th/15	13	35	17	384	29.54
Amber Davies	Actress	29	Nikita Kuzmin	23	=2nd/15	16	40	27	579	36.19
George Clarke	Internet personality	25	Alexis Warr	23	=2nd/15	16	39	24	531	33.19
Karen Carney	Footballer & pundit	38	Carlos Gu	23	1st/15	16	40	20	543	33.94
Chris Appleton	Hairstylist	43	Amy Dowden	24	15th/15	2	17	16	33	16.5
Melanie Walters	Actress	64	Aljaž Škorjanec	24	14th/15	3	17	15	47	15.7
Sarah Storey	Paralympic cyclist & swimmer	48	Julian Caillon	24	13th/15	4	24	15	80	20.0
Shaun Wright-Phillips	Footballer	44	Alexis Warr	24	12th/15	5	28	15	100	20.0
Lawrence Robb	Actor	34	Jowita Przystał	24	11th/15	6	30	19	134	22.3
Bethany Antonia	Actress	28	Nancy Xu	24	10th/15	7	30	25	192	27.4
Will Best	TV & radio presenter	41	Dianne Buswell	24	9th/15	8	32	18	212	26.5
Jaime Winstone	Actress	41	Carlos Gu	24	8th/15	8	34	21	221	27.6
Cach Mercer	TV personality	25	Maddie Ingoldsby	24						
Dani Dyer	TV personality	30	Nikita Kuzmin	24						
Delta Goodrem	Singer & actress	42	Kai Widdrington	24						
Graeme Hall	TV presenter	59	Lauren Oakley	24						
John Nellis	Internet personality	33	Katya Jones	24						
Lacey Turner	Actress	38	Vito Coppola	24						
Tabby Stoecker	Olympic skeleton racer	25	Mark Karmalita	24						

== Gallery of winners ==
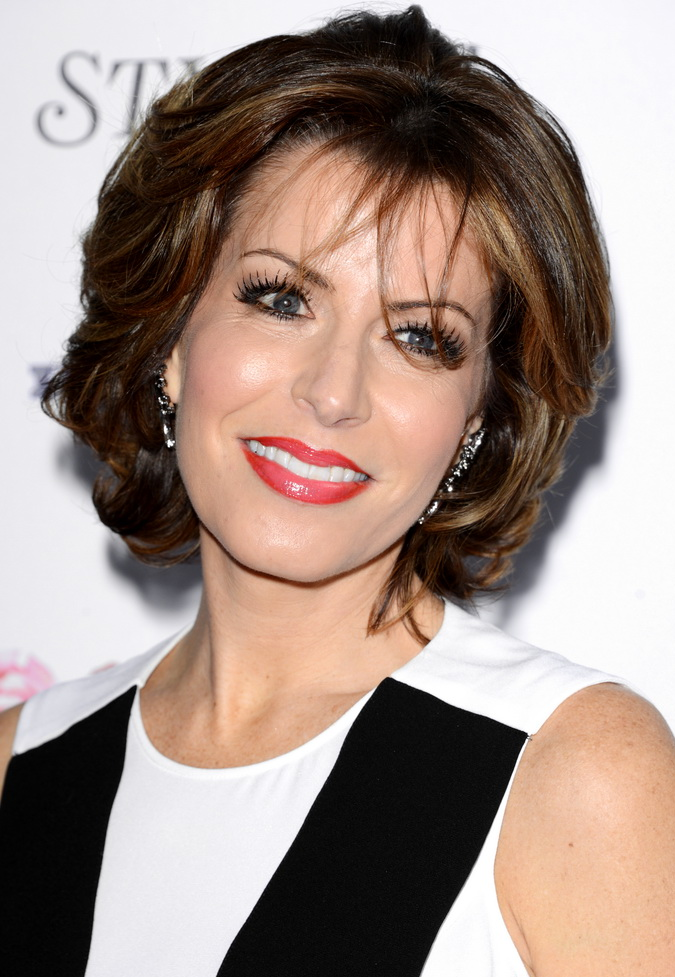
Natasha Kaplinsky, winner of series 1 (2004)

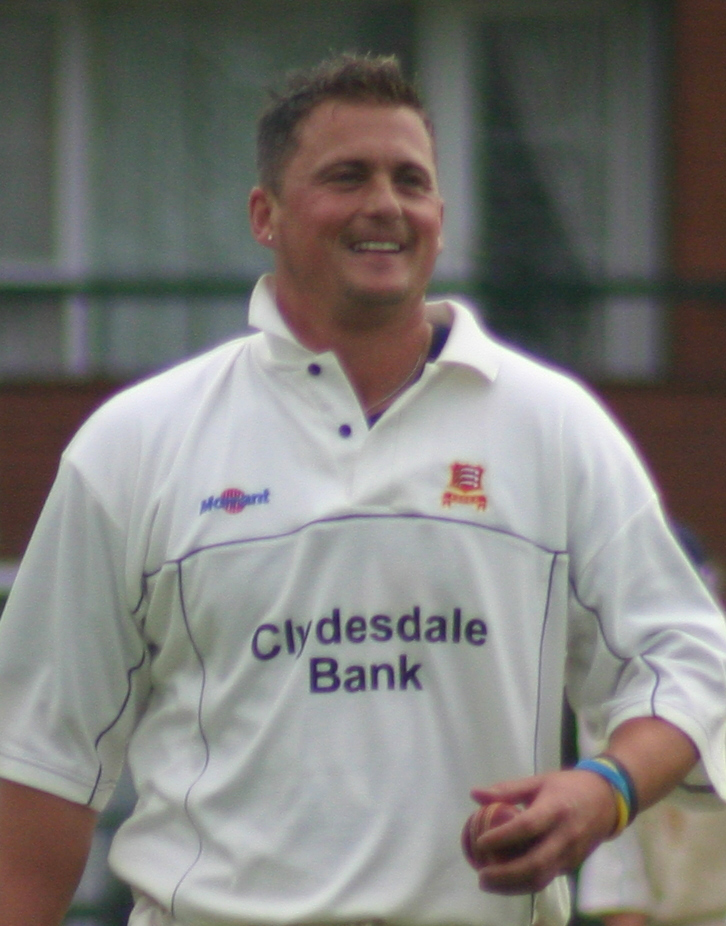
Darren Gough, winner of series 3 (2005)

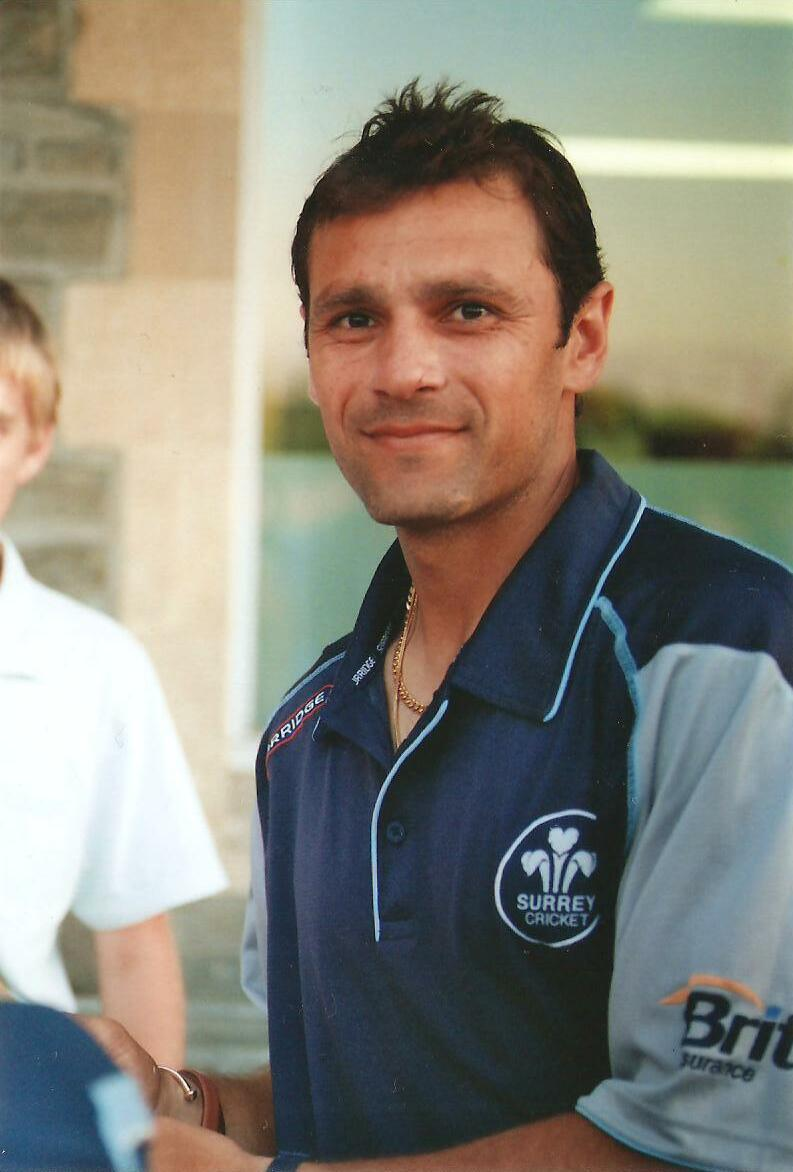
Mark Ramprakash, winner of series 4 (2006)

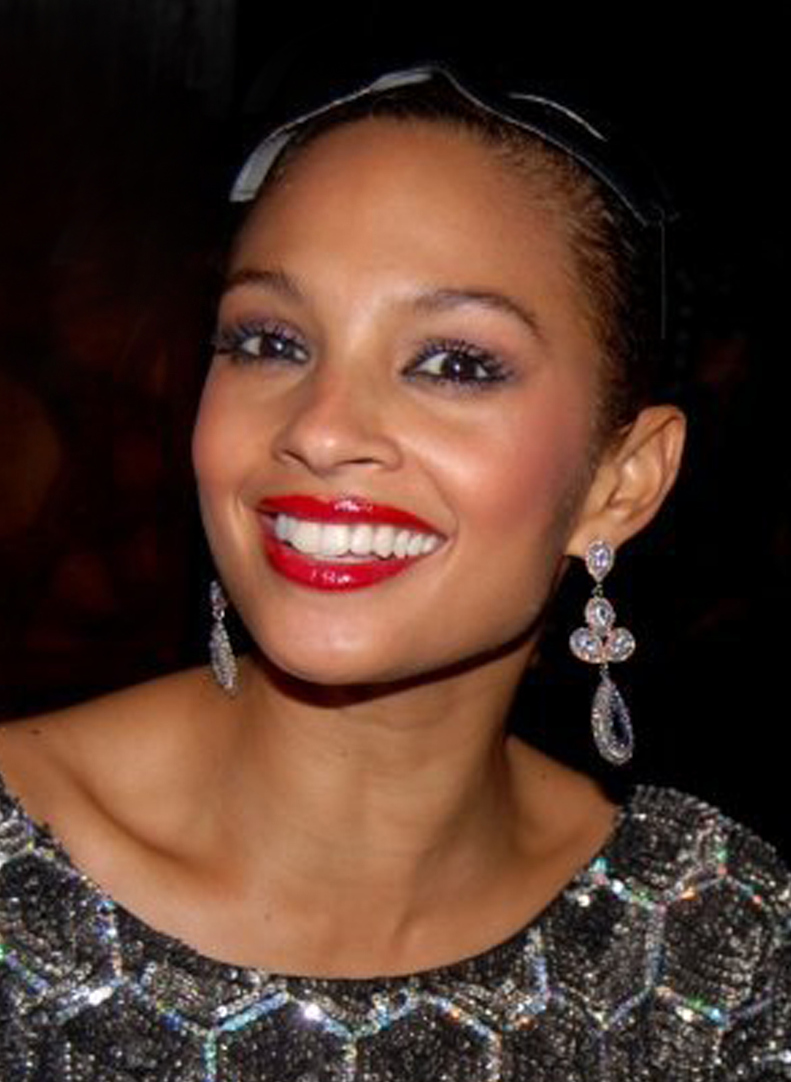
Alesha Dixon, winner of series 5 (2007)

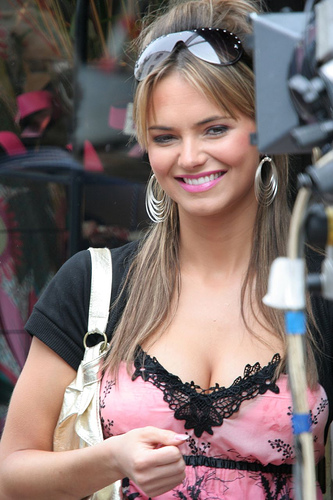
Kara Tointon, winner of series 8 (2010)

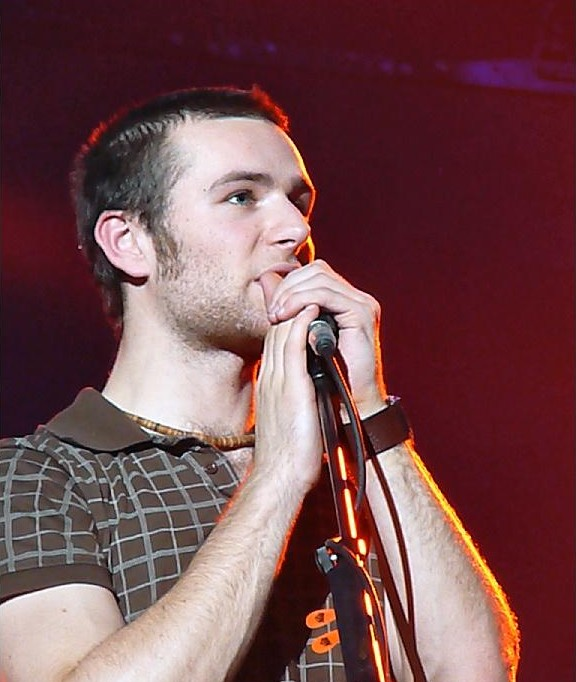
Harry Judd, winner of series 9 (2011)

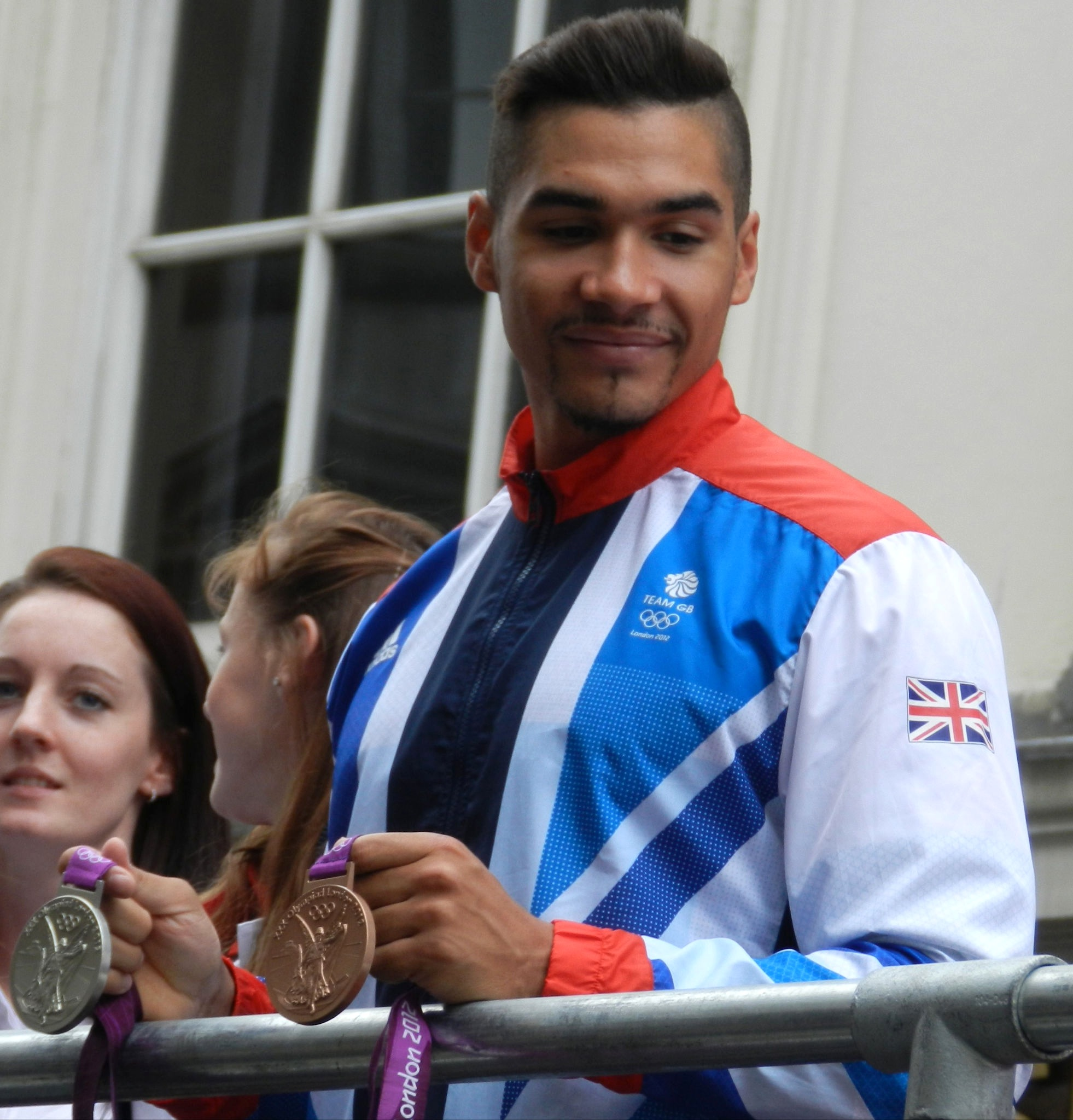
Louis Smith, winner of series 10 (2012)

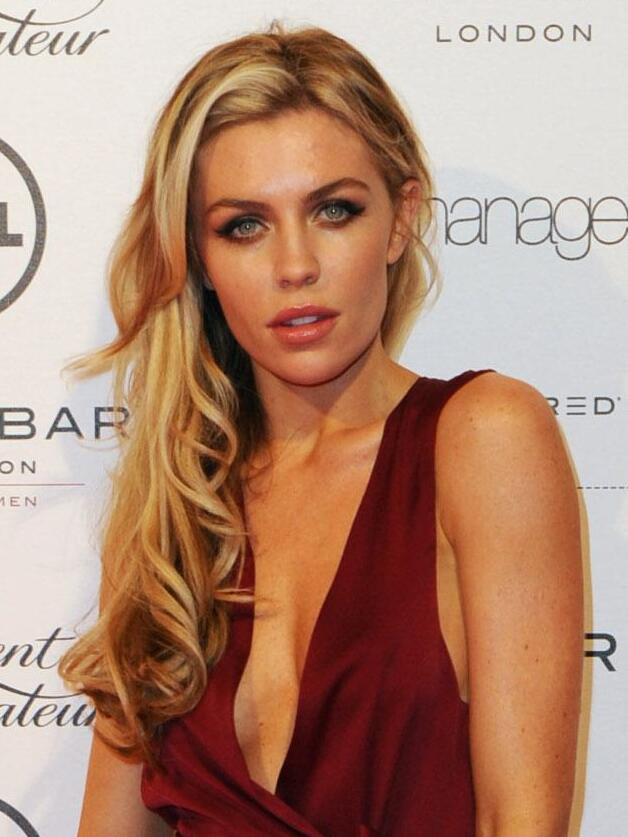
Abbey Clancy, winner of series 11 (2013)

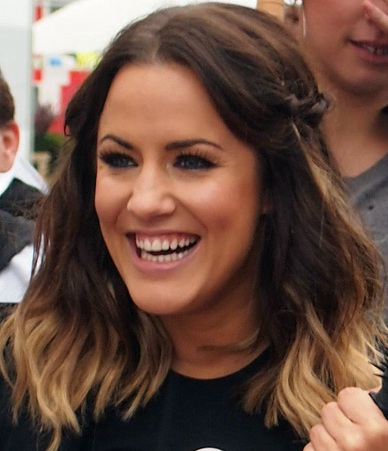
Caroline Flack, winner of series 12 (2014)

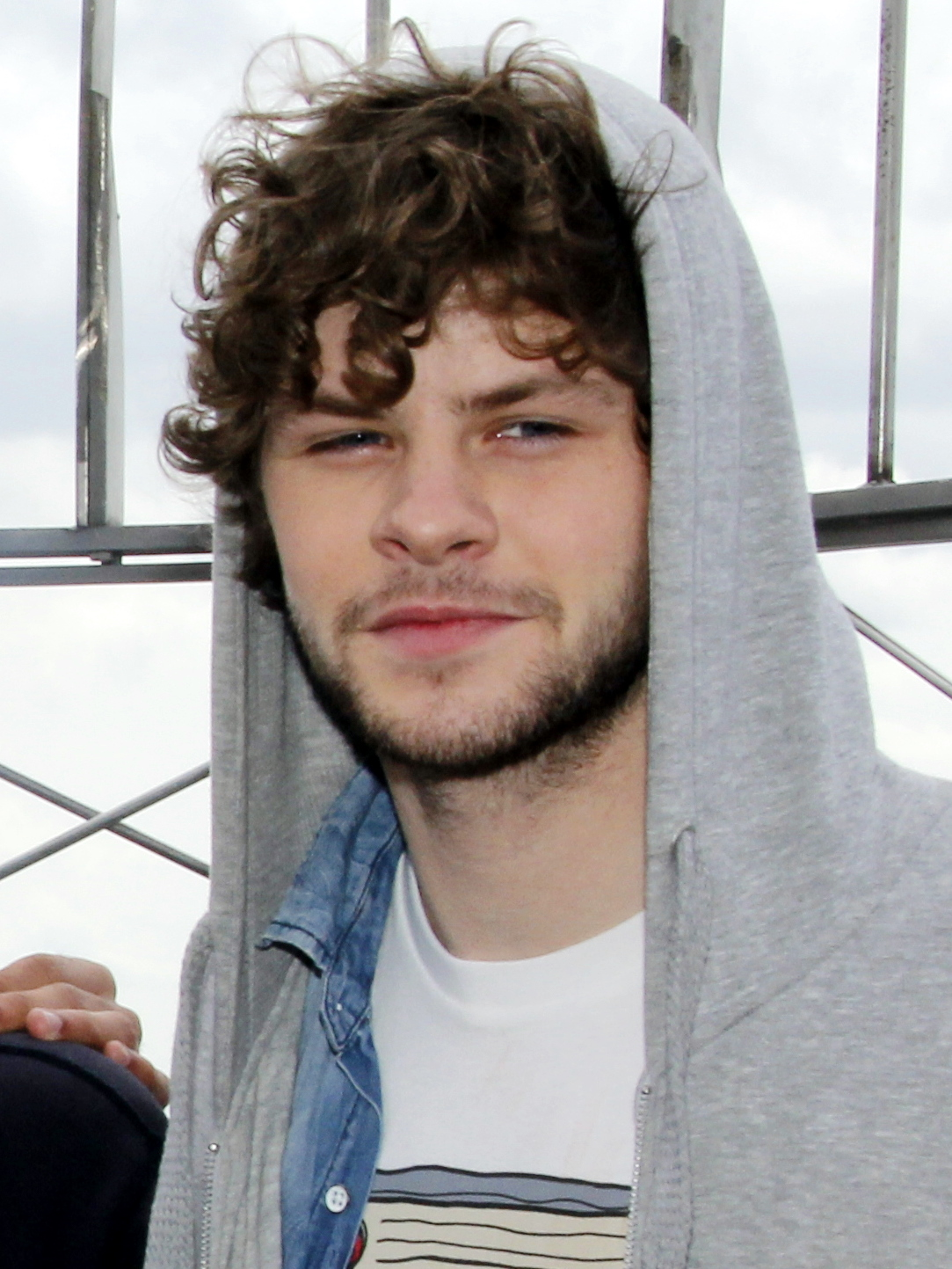
Jay McGuiness, winner of series 13 (2015)

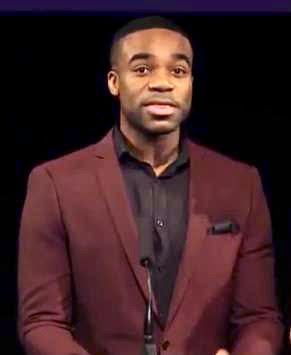
Ore Oduba, winner of series 14 (2016)

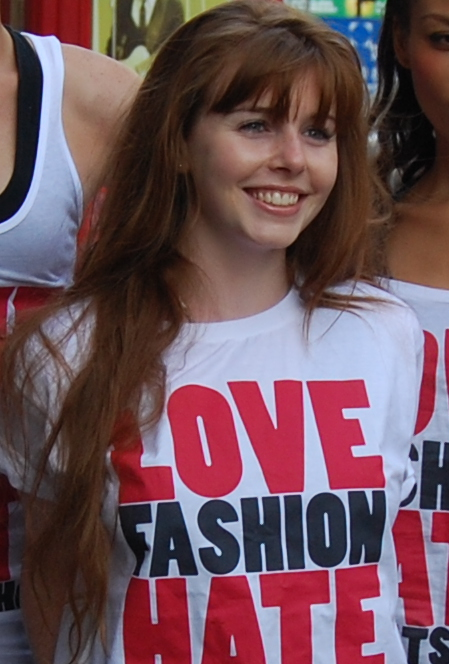
Stacey Dooley, winner of series 16 (2018)

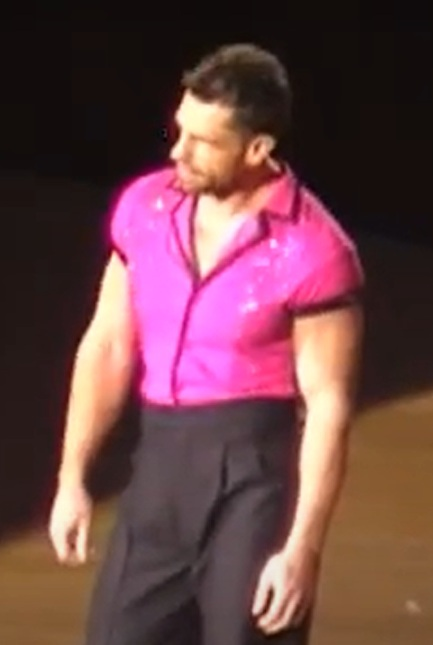
Kelvin Fletcher, winner of series 17 (2019)

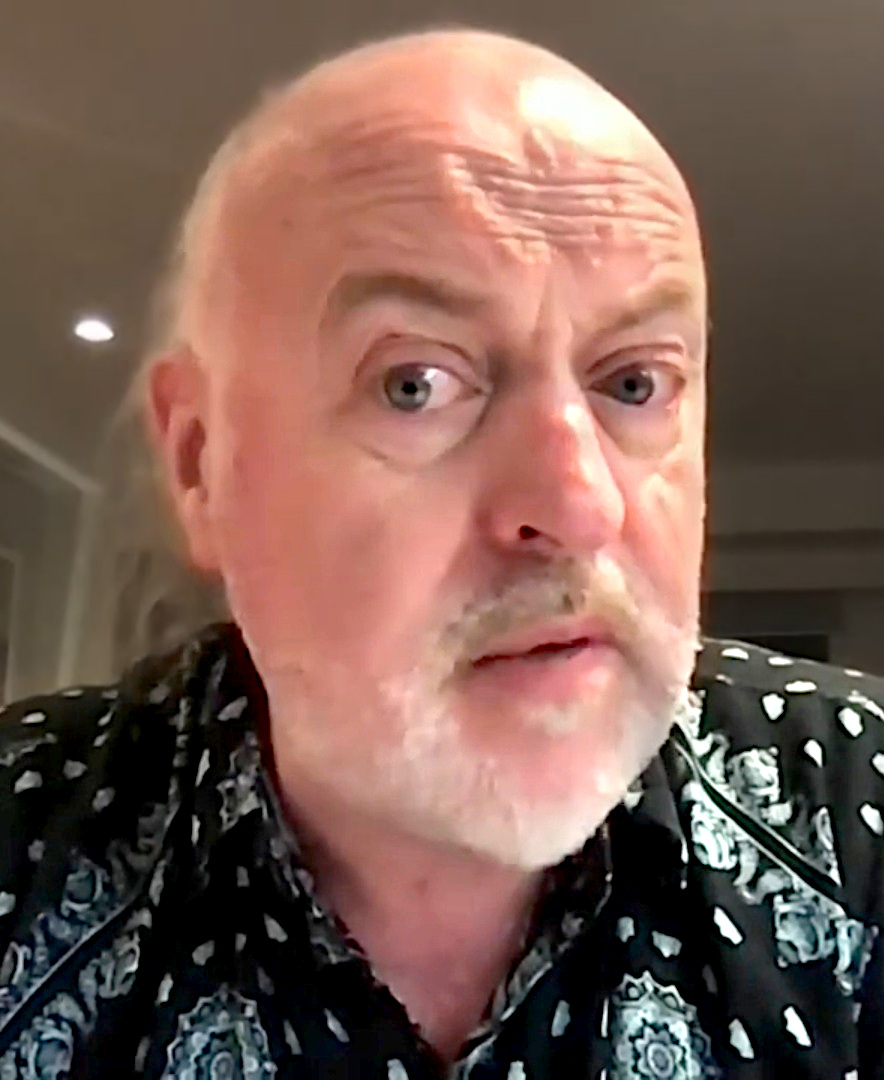
Bill Bailey, winner of series 18 (2020)

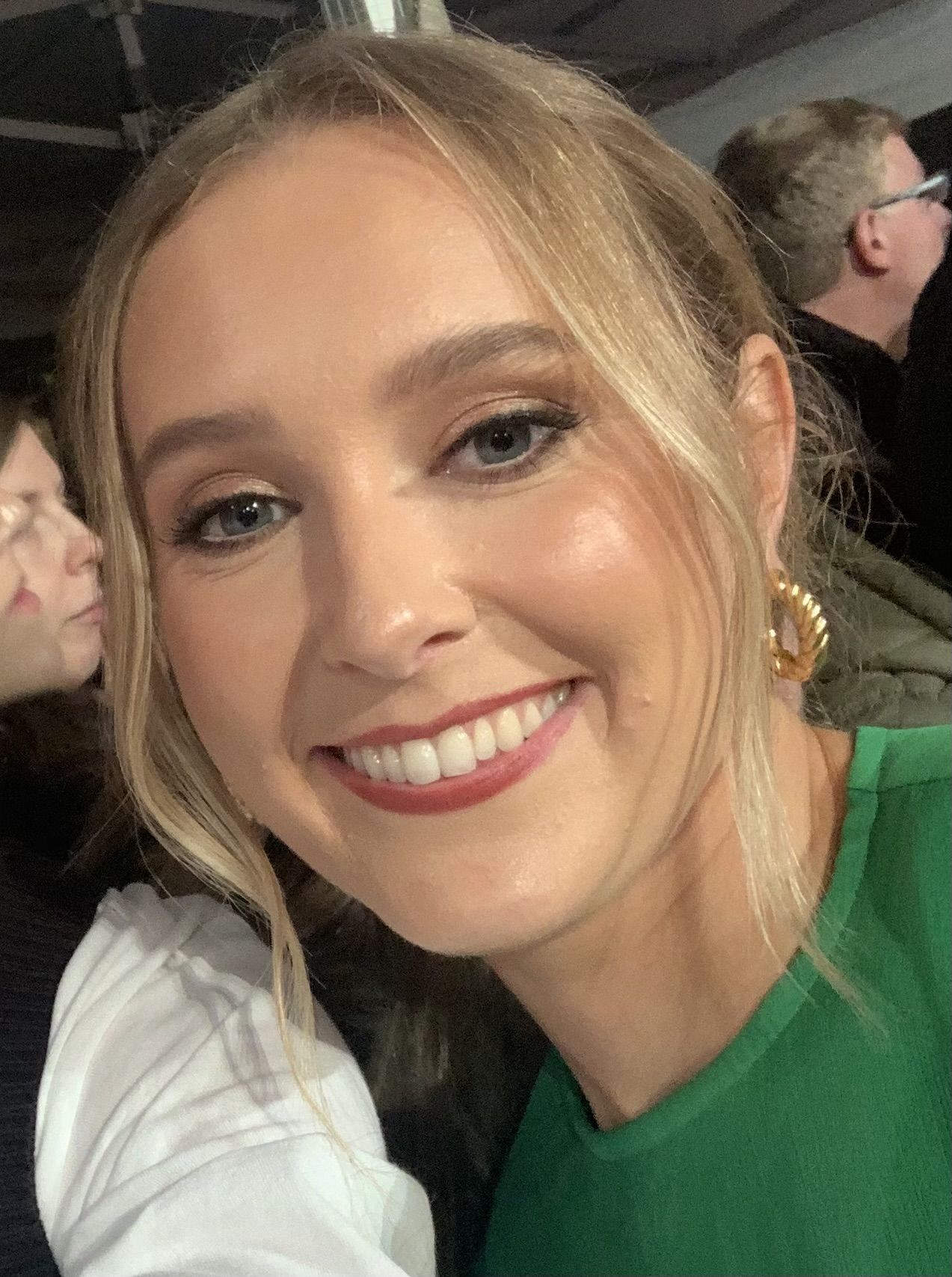
Rose Ayling-Ellis, winner of series 19 (2021)

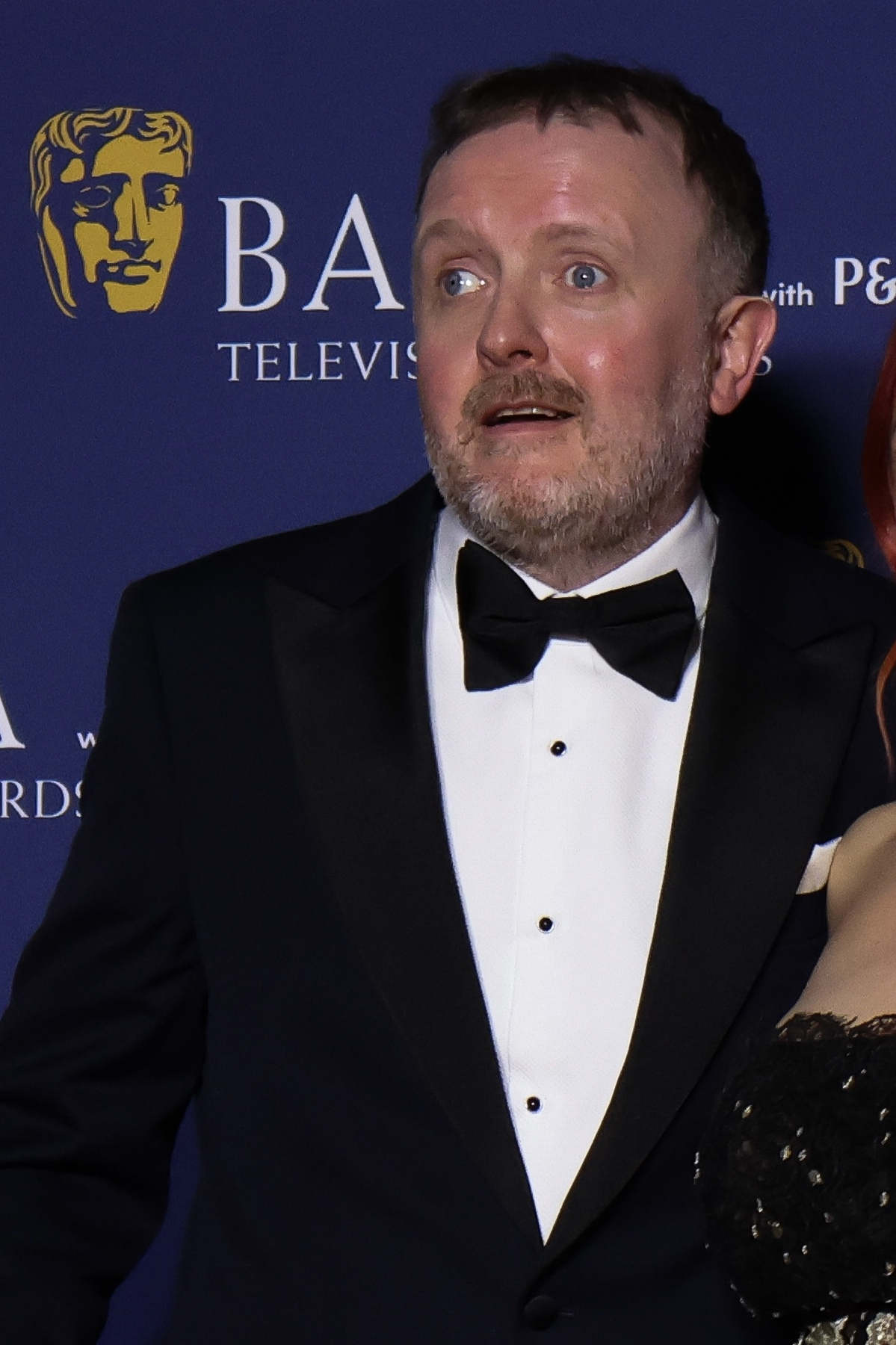
Chris McCausland, winner of series 22 (2024)

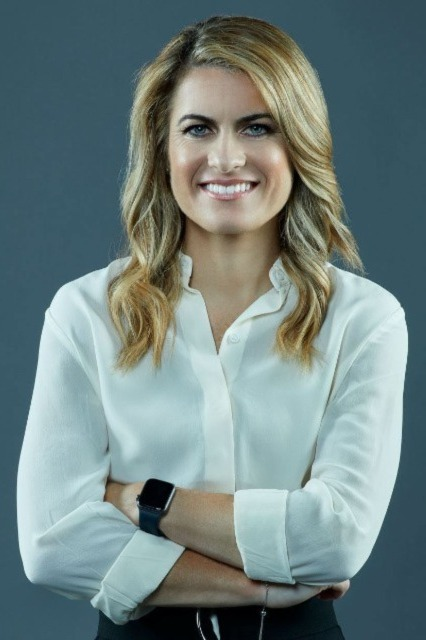
Karen Carney, winner of series 23 (2025)

== See also ==
- Strictly Come Dancing
