= Strictly Come Dancing series 2 =

2004 British TV show

Strictly Come Dancing
- Series 2
- Presented by: Bruce Forsyth; Tess Daly; Natasha Kaplinsky
- Judges: Len Goodman; Arlene Phillips; Craig Revel Horwood; Bruno Tonioli
- Celebrity winner: Jill Halfpenny
- Professional winner: Darren Bennett
- No. of episodes: 16

Release
- Original network: BBC One
- Original release: 23 October – 11 December 2004

Series chronology
- ← Previous; Series 1 Next → Series 3

Strictly Come Dancing returned for its second series on 23 October 2004 on BBC One. Bruce Forsyth and Tess Daly returned to present the main show on BBC One, while Claudia Winkleman presented a new spin-off show called Strictly Come Dancing: It Takes Two on BBC Two. Series 1 winner Natasha Kaplinsky filled in for Daly during the first five weeks due to Daly's maternity leave. Len Goodman, Arlene Phillips, Craig Revel Horwood, and Bruno Tonioli returned to the judging panel.

Actress Jill Halfpenny and Darren Bennett were announced as the winners on 11 December 2004, while Olympic heptathlete Denise Lewis and Ian Waite finished in second place, and comedian Julian Clary and Erin Boag finished in third.

== Format ==
Hosts and Judges for Strictly Come Dancing (Series 2)

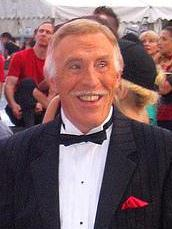
Bruce Forsyth

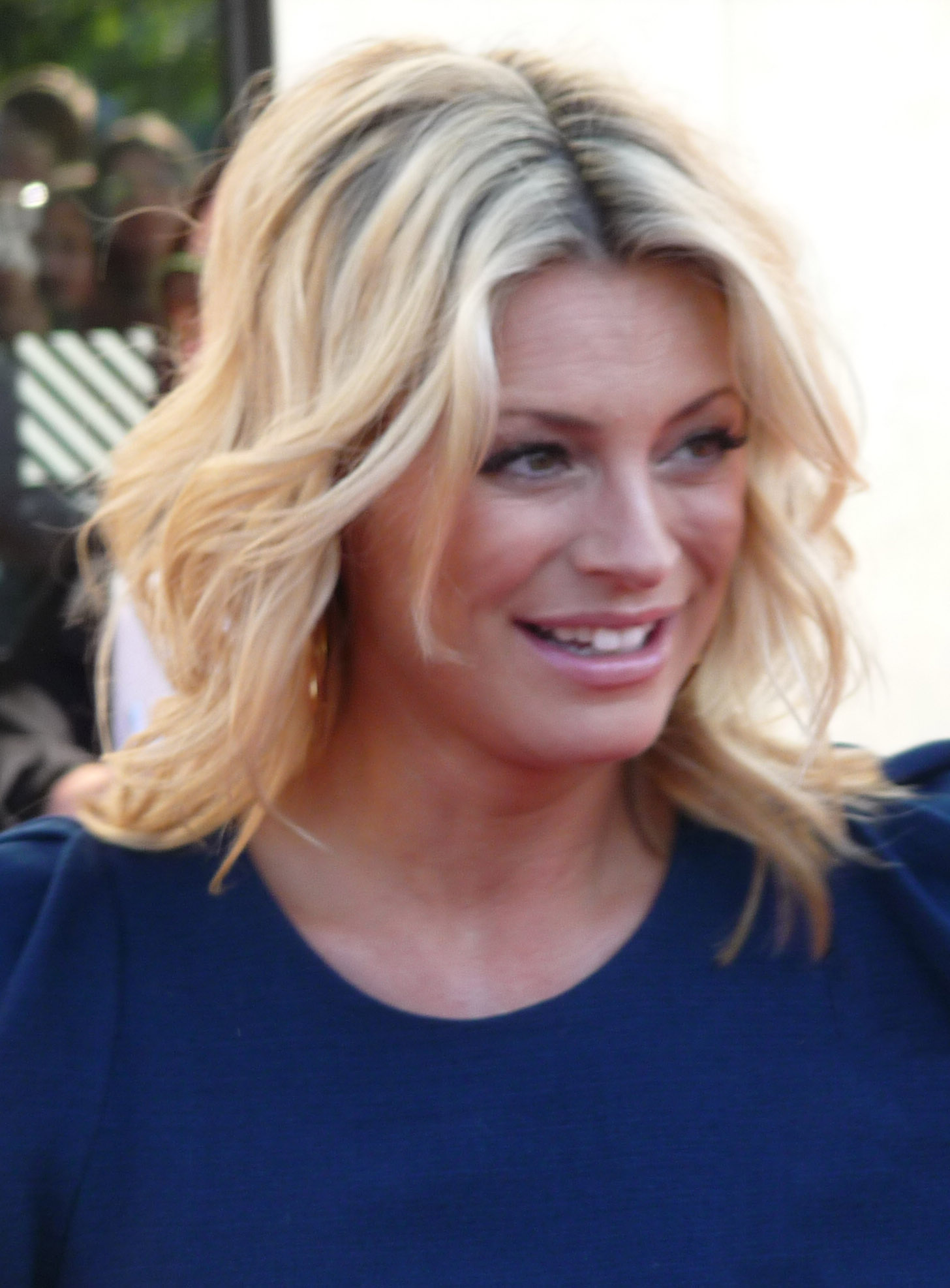
Tess Daly

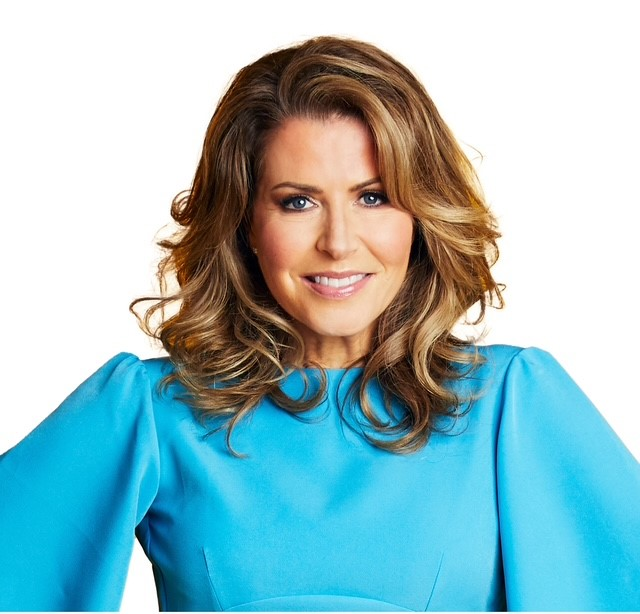
Natasha Kaplinsky

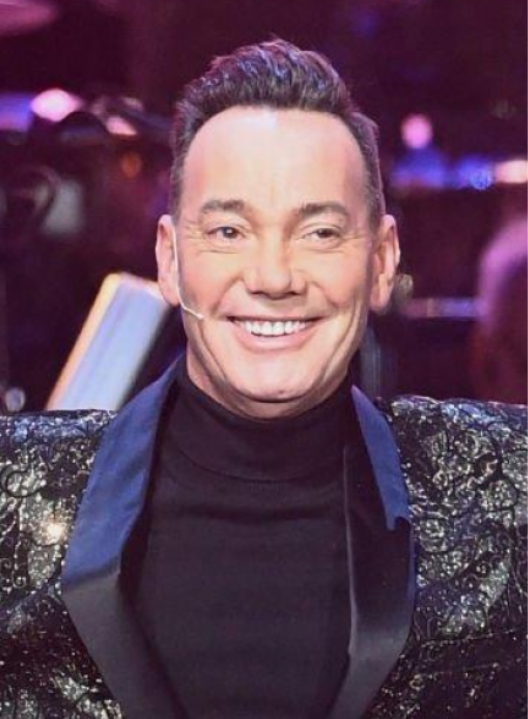
Craig Revel Horwood

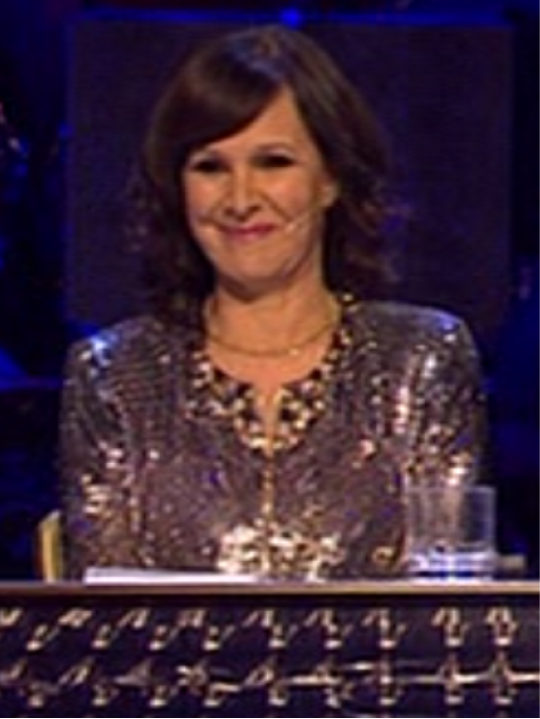
Arlene Phillips

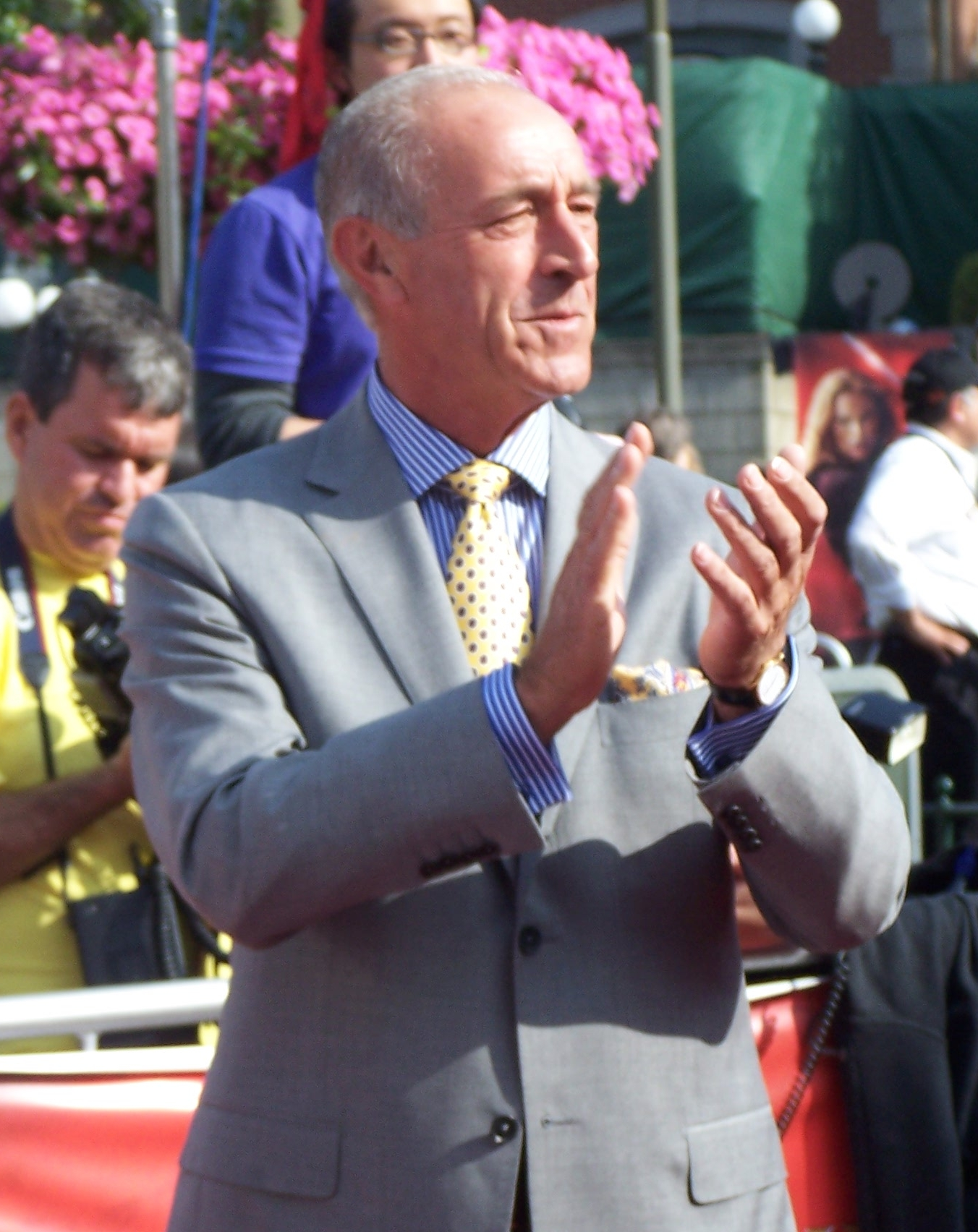
Len Goodman

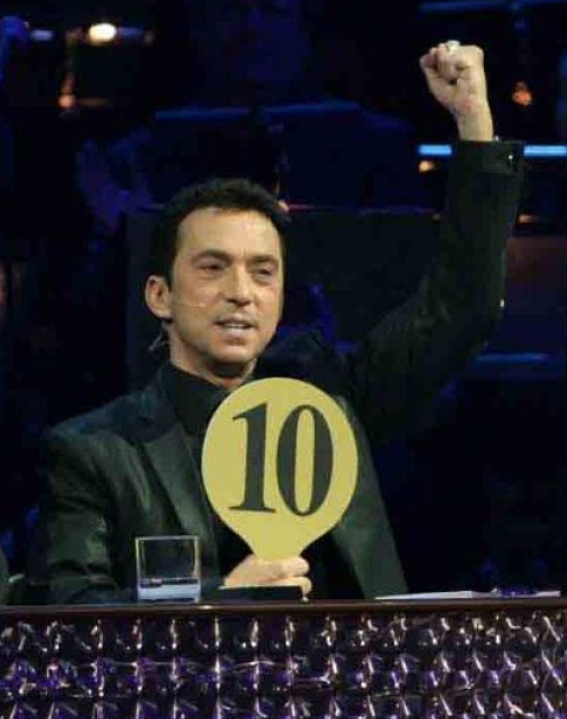
Bruno Tonioli

The couples dance each week in a live show. The judges score each performance out of ten. The couples are then ranked according to the judges' scores and given points according to their rank, with the lowest scored couple receiving one point, and the highest scored couple receiving the most points (the maximum number of points available depends on the number of couples remaining in the competition). The public are also invited to vote for their favourite couples, and the couples are ranked again according to the number of votes they receive, again receiving points; the couple with the fewest votes receiving one point, and the couple with the most votes receiving the most points.

The points for judges' score and public vote are then added together, and the two couples with the fewest points are placed in the bottom two. If two couples have equal points, the points from the public vote are given precedence.

== Couples ==
This series featured ten celebrity contestants.

Celebrity	Notability	Professional partner	Status
Quentin Willson	Motoring journalist & television presenter	Hazel Newberry	Eliminated 1st on 23 October 2004
Carol Vorderman	Countdown presenter	Paul Killick	Eliminated 2nd on 30 October 2004
Esther Rantzen	Television presenter & journalist	Anton Du Beke	Eliminated 3rd on 6 November 2004
Diarmuid Gavin	Garden designer & television presenter	Nicole Cutler	Eliminated 4th on 13 November 2004
Sarah Manners	Casualty actress	Brendan Cole	Eliminated 5th on 20 November 2004
Roger Black	Olympic sprinter & sports presenter	Camilla Dallerup	Eliminated 6th on 27 November 2004
Aled Jones	Singer & television presenter	Lilia Kopylova	Eliminated 7th on 4 December 2004
Julian Clary	Stand-up comedian	Erin Boag	Third place on 11 December 2004
Denise Lewis	Olympic heptathlete	Ian Waite	Runners-up on 11 December 2004
Jill Halfpenny	EastEnders actress	Darren Bennett	Winners on 11 December 2004

== Scoring chart ==
The highest score each week is indicated in bold green with a dagger (†), while the lowest score each week is indicated in italicized red with a double-dagger (‡).

Color key:

Winners
Runners-up
Third place
Bottom two
Eliminated

Strictly Come Dancing (series 2) - Weekly scores
Couple	Pl.	Week							
Couple	Pl.	1	2	3	4	5	6	7	8
Jill & Darren	1st	27	**32**†	**35**†	**34**†	**35**†	32+36=**68**†	29+37=66	34+40=**74**† (Note: This couple finished in first place.)
Denise & Ian	2nd	**31**†	**32**†	25 (Note: This couple was in the bottom two, but was not eliminated.)	30	32	34+33=67	35+36=**71**†	38+33=71 (Note: This couple finished in second place.)
Julian & Erin	3rd	19	27	27	20	24	28+27=55	24+21=45‡	29+23=52‡ (Note: This couple finished in third place.)
Aled & Lilia	4th	29	27	32	25	30	29+27=56	27+30=57 (Note: This couple was eliminated.)	
Roger & Camilla	5th	25	22	25	29	23‡	22+19=41‡		
Sarah & Brendan	6th	28	23	31	29	23‡			
Diarmuid & Nicole	7th	12	12‡	14‡	17‡				
Esther & Anton	8th	24	16	16					
Carol & Paul	9th	22	20						
Quentin & Hazel	10th	8‡							

=== Average chart ===
This table only counts for dances scored on a traditional 40-point scale.

Couple	Rank by average	Total points	Number of dances	Total average
Jill & Darren	1st	371	11	33.7
Denise & Ian	2nd	359	11	32.6
Aled & Lilia	3rd	256	9	28.4
Sarah & Brendan	4th	134	5	26.8
Julian & Erin	5th	269	11	24.5
Roger & Camilla	6th	165	7	23.6
Carol & Paul	7th	42	2	21.0
Esther & Anton	8th	56	3	18.7
Diarmuid & Nicole	9th	55	4	13.8
Quentin & Hazel	10th	8	1	8.0

== Weekly scores ==
Unless indicated otherwise, individual judges scores are given (in parentheses) in this order from left to right: Craig Revel Horwood, Arlene Phillips, Len Goodman, Bruno Tonioli.

=== Week 1 ===
Couples performed either the cha-cha-cha or the waltz, and are listed in the order they performed.

Couple	Scores	Dance	Music	Result
Julian & Erin	19 (4, 4, 5, 6)	Cha-cha-cha	"I'm Outta Love" — Anastacia	Safe
Carol & Paul	22 (5, 6, 5, 6)	Waltz	"Until It's Time for You to Go" — Buffy Sainte-Marie	Bottom two
Diarmuid & Nicole	12 (2, 2, 4, 4)	Cha-cha-cha	"September" — Earth, Wind & Fire	Safe
Esther & Anton	24 (5, 6, 6, 7)	Waltz	"Moon River" — Andy Williams	Safe
Quentin & Hazel	8 (1, 1, 3, 3)	Cha-cha-cha	"Pink Cadillac" — Natalie Cole	Eliminated
Sarah & Brendan	28 (6, 7, 7, 8)	Waltz	"I Wonder Why" — Curtis Stigers	Safe
Roger & Camilla	25 (6, 6, 7, 6)	Cha-cha-cha	"Get The Party Started" — P!nk	Safe
Denise & Ian	31 (7, 8, 8, 8)	Waltz	"True Love" — Pat Boone	Safe
Aled & Lilia	29 (7, 7, 8, 7)	Cha-cha-cha	"She Bangs" — Ricky Martin	Safe
Jill & Darren	27 (7, 7, 6, 7)	Waltz	"Weekend in New England" — Barry Manilow	Safe

=== Week 2 ===
Couples performed either the quickstep or the rumba, and are listed in the order they performed.

Couple	Scores	Dance	Music	Result
Jill & Darren	32 (8, 8, 8, 8)	Rumba	"Lady in Red" — Chris de Burgh	Safe
Aled & Lilia	27 (7, 6, 7, 7)	Quickstep	"Cabaret" — Liza Minnelli	Safe
Sarah & Brendan	23 (5, 6, 6, 6)	Rumba	"I Don't Want To Miss A Thing" — Aerosmith	Safe
Roger & Camilla	22 (5, 5, 6, 6)	Quickstep	"Mack The Knife" — Bobby Darin	Safe
Esther & Anton	16 (2, 4, 5, 5)	Rumba	"The Look of Love" — Dusty Springfield	Bottom two
Diarmuid & Nicole	12 (2, 3, 4, 3)	Quickstep	"I'll Be There For You" — The Rembrandts	Safe
Carol & Paul	20 (5, 4, 5, 6)	Rumba	"Truly" — Lionel Richie	Eliminated
Julian & Erin	27 (6, 7, 7, 7)	Quickstep	"Diamonds Are A Girl's Best Friend" — Marilyn Monroe	Safe
Denise & Ian	32 (8, 8, 8, 8)	Rumba	"My Heart Will Go On" — Celine Dion	Safe

=== Week 3 ===
Couples performed either the jive or the tango, and are listed in the order they performed.

Couple	Scores	Dance	Music	Result
Roger & Camilla	25 (6, 6, 7, 6)	Jive	"Teenage Wedding" — from Johnny Angel	Safe
Julian & Erin	27 (6, 7, 7, 7)	Tango	"Roxanne" — The Police	Safe
Jill & Darren	35 (8, 9, 9, 9)	Jive	"I'm Still Standing" — Elton John	Safe
Esther & Anton	16 (2, 4, 5, 5)	Tango	"Tanguera" — Mariano Mores	Eliminated
Denise & Ian	25 (6, 6, 6, 7)	Jive	"Some Girls" — Rachel Stevens	Bottom two
Diarmuid & Nicole	14 (2, 3, 5, 4)	Tango	"Por Una Cabeza" — Quintango	Safe
Aled & Lilia	32 (8, 8, 8, 8)	Jive	"Crazy Little Thing Called Love" — Queen	Safe
Sarah & Brendan	31 (7, 8, 8, 8)	Tango	"Hernando's Hideaway" — Alma Cogan	Safe

=== Week 4 ===
Couples performed either the foxtrot or the paso doble, and are listed in the order they performed.

Couple	Scores	Dance	Music	Result
Denise & Ian	30 (7, 7, 8, 8)	Foxtrot	"Let There Be Love" — Nat King Cole	Safe
Sarah & Brendan	29 (8, 7, 6, 8)	Paso doble	"Bring Me To Life" — Evanescence	Bottom two
Aled & Lilia	25 (7, 6, 6, 6)	Foxtrot	"T'ain't What You Do" — Cleo Laine	Safe
Julian & Erin	20 (4, 5, 6, 5)	Paso doble	"Les toreadors" — Georges Bizet	Safe
Roger & Camilla	29 (6, 8, 8, 7)	Foxtrot	"Why Don't You Do Right" — Peggy Lee	Safe
Diarmuid & Nicole	17 (3, 4, 5, 5)	Paso doble	"L'amour est un oiseau rebelle" — Georges Bizet	Eliminated
Jill & Darren	34 (8, 9, 9, 8)	Foxtrot	"All That Jazz" — Catherine Zeta-Jones	Safe

=== Week 5: Blackpool Week ===
This week's episode was staged in the Tower Ballroom at the Blackpool Tower in Blackpool, Lancashire. Couples performed the samba, and are listed in the order they performed.

Couple	Scores	Dance	Music	Result
Sarah & Brendan	23 (5, 6, 6, 6)	Samba	"Kiss Kiss" — Holly Valance	Eliminated
Julian & Erin	24 (5, 5, 7, 7)	Samba	"Conga" — Gloria Estefan	Bottom two
Denise & Ian	32 (7, 8, 8, 9)	Samba	"Tequila" — The Champs	Safe
Roger & Camilla	23 (4, 5, 7, 7)	Samba	"Whenever, Wherever" — Shakira	Safe
Jill & Darren	35 (8, 9, 9, 9)	Samba	"Copacabana" — Barry Manilow	Safe
Aled & Lilia	30 (6, 8, 8, 8)	Samba	"It's Not Unusual" — Tom Jones	Safe

=== Week 6: Quarterfinal ===
Each couple performed two unlearned routines, and are listed in the order they performed.

Couple	Scores	Dance	Music	Result
Roger & Camilla	22 (5, 5, 6, 6)	Waltz	"She's The One" — Robbie Williams	Eliminated
Roger & Camilla	19 (3, 4, 6, 6)	Rumba	"We've Got Tonight" — Kenny Rogers	Eliminated
Jill & Darren	32 (8, 8, 8, 8)	Quickstep	"Get Happy" — Judy Garland	Safe
Jill & Darren	36 (9, 9, 9, 9)	Cha-cha-cha	"She's A Lady" — Tom Jones	Safe
Julian & Erin	28 (7, 7, 7, 7)	Waltz	"You Light Up My Life" — Debby Boone	Bottom two
Julian & Erin	27 (6, 7, 7, 7)	Rumba	"You're Still The One" — Shania Twain	Bottom two
Denise & Ian	34 (7, 9, 9, 9)	Quickstep	"Sing, Sing, Sing" — Benny Goodman	Safe
Denise & Ian	33 (8, 8, 8, 9)	Cha-cha-cha	"Uptown Girl" — Billy Joel	Safe
Aled & Lilia	29 (7, 7, 7, 8)	Waltz	"Love Ain't Here Anymore" — Take That	Safe
Aled & Lilia	27 (5, 6, 8, 8)	Rumba	"When You Say Nothing at All" — Ronan Keating	Safe

=== Week 7: Semifinal ===
Each couple performed two unlearned routines, and are listed in the order they performed.

Couple	Scores	Dance	Music	Result
Aled & Lilia	27 (6, 7, 7, 7)	Tango	"Cell Block Tango" — Catherine Zeta-Jones	Eliminated
Aled & Lilia	30 (7, 7, 8, 8)	Paso doble	"Malaguena" — Connie Francis	Eliminated
Jill & Darren	29 (7, 8, 7, 7)	Tango	"Objection Tango" — Vio Friedmann	Safe
Jill & Darren	37 (9, 10, 9, 9)	Paso doble	"Espana Cani" — André Rieu	Safe
Julian & Erin	24 (5, 5, 8, 6)	Foxtrot	"Fever" — Peggy Lee	Safe
Julian & Erin	21 (4, 3, 7, 7)	Jive	"Wake Me Up Before You Go-Go" — Wham!	Safe
Denise & Ian	35 (8, 9, 9, 9)	Tango	"Goldfinger" — Shirley Bassey	Bottom two
Denise & Ian	36 (9, 9, 9, 9)	Paso doble	"Don't Cry For Me Argentina" — Madonna	Bottom two

=== Week 8: Final ===
The series finale was staged in the Tower Ballroom at the Blackpool Tower. Each couple performed three routines: their favourite ballroom dance, their favourite Latin dance, and their showdance routine. Couples are listed in the order they performed.

Couple	Scores	Dance	Music	Result
Denise & Ian	38 (9, 10, 9, 10)	Quickstep	"Sing, Sing, Sing" — Benny Goodman	Runners-up
Denise & Ian	33 (8, 8, 8, 9)	Samba	"Tequila" — The Champs	Runners-up
Denise & Ian		Showdance	"I Wanna Dance with Somebody" — Whitney Houston	Runners-up
Jill & Darren	34 (9, 8, 9, 8)	Foxtrot	"All That Jazz" — Catherine Zeta-Jones	Winners
Jill & Darren	40 (10, 10, 10, 10)	Jive	"I'm Still Standing" — Elton John	Winners
Jill & Darren		Showdance	"Can't Take My Eyes Off You" — Frankie Valli	Winners
Julian & Erin	29 (7, 7, 8, 7)	Quickstep	"Diamonds Are A Girl's Best Friend" — Marilyn Monroe	Third place
Julian & Erin	23 (5, 5, 7, 6)	Samba	"Conga" — Gloria Estefan	Third place
Julian & Erin		Showdance	"Take My Breath Away" — Berlin	Third place

== Dance chart ==
The couples performed the following each week:

- Week 1: One unlearned dance (cha-cha-cha or waltz)
- Week 2: One unlearned dance (quickstep or rumba)
- Week 3: One unlearned dance (jive or tango)
- Week 4: One unlearned dance (foxtrot or paso doble)
- Week 5: Samba
- Week 6 (Quarterfinal): Two unlearned dances
- Week 7 (Semifinal): Two unlearned dances
- Week 8 (Final): Favourite ballroom dance, favourite Latin dance & showdance

Strictly Come Dancing (series 2) - Dance chart
Couple	Week											
Couple	1	2	3	4	5	6		7		8		
Jill & Darren	Waltz	Rumba	Jive	Foxtrot	Samba	Quickstep	Cha-cha-cha	Tango	Paso doble	Foxtrot	Jive	Showdance
Denise & Ian	Waltz	Rumba	Jive	Foxtrot	Samba	Quickstep	Cha-cha-cha	Tango	Paso doble	Quickstep	Samba	Showdance
Julian & Erin	Cha-cha-cha	Quickstep	Tango	Paso doble	Samba	Waltz	Rumba	Foxtrot	Jive	Quickstep	Samba	Showdance
Aled & Lilia	Cha-cha-cha	Quickstep	Jive	Foxtrot	Samba	Waltz	Rumba	Tango	Paso doble			
Roger & Camilla	Cha-cha-cha	Quickstep	Jive	Foxtrot	Samba	Waltz	Rumba					
Sarah & Brendan	Waltz	Rumba	Tango	Paso doble	Samba							
Diarmuid & Nicole	Cha-cha-cha	Quickstep	Tango	Paso doble								
Esther & Anton	Waltz	Rumba	Tango									
Carol & Paul	Waltz	Rumba										
Quentin & Hazel	Cha-cha-cha											

== Ratings ==
Weekly ratings for each show on BBC One. All ratings are provided by BARB.

Episode	Date	Official rating (millions)	Weekly rank for BBC One	Weekly rank for all UK TV
Week 1	23 October	6.54	11	29
Week 2	30 October	7.46	8	21
Week 2 results	30 October	8.23	5	16
Week 3	6 November	7.33	9	24
Week 3 results	6 November	8.72	5	16
Week 4	13 November	8.81	5	17
Week 5	20 November	8.71	5	18
Week 5 results	20 November	9.39	4	15
Week 6	27 November	8.11	6	27
Week 6 results	27 November	8.82	5	21
Week 7	4 December	8.53	6	20
Week 7 results	4 December	8.62	5	19
Week 8	11 December	9.70	6	14
Week 8 results	11 December	11.60	1	5
Series average	2004	8.61	—N/a	—N/a
