= Strictly Come Dancing series 1 =

2004 British television show

Strictly Come Dancing
- Series 1
- Presented by: Bruce Forsyth; Tess Daly
- Judges: Len Goodman; Arlene Phillips; Craig Revel Horwood; Bruno Tonioli
- Celebrity winner: Natasha Kaplinsky
- Professional winner: Brendan Cole
- No. of episodes: 9

Release
- Original network: BBC One
- Original release: 15 May – 3 July 2004

Series chronology
- Next → Series 2

Strictly Come Dancing aired its first series on BBC One from 15 May 2004 to 3 July 2004. The series was presented by Bruce Forsyth and Tess Daly, while Justin Lee Collins presented BBC Three's spin-off show Strictly Come Dancing: On Three. The judging panel consisted of Len Goodman, Arlene Phillips, Craig Revel Horwood, and Bruno Tonioli.

On 3 July 2004, journalist Natasha Kaplinsky and Brendan Cole were announced as the winners, while EastEnders actor Christopher Parker and Hanna Karttunen finished in second place.

This was the only series to air in the spring/summer season; all other series of Strictly Come Dancing would air in the autumn/winter season.

== Format ==
Hosts and Judges for Strictly Come Dancing (Series 1)

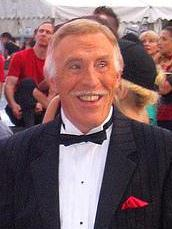
Bruce Forsyth

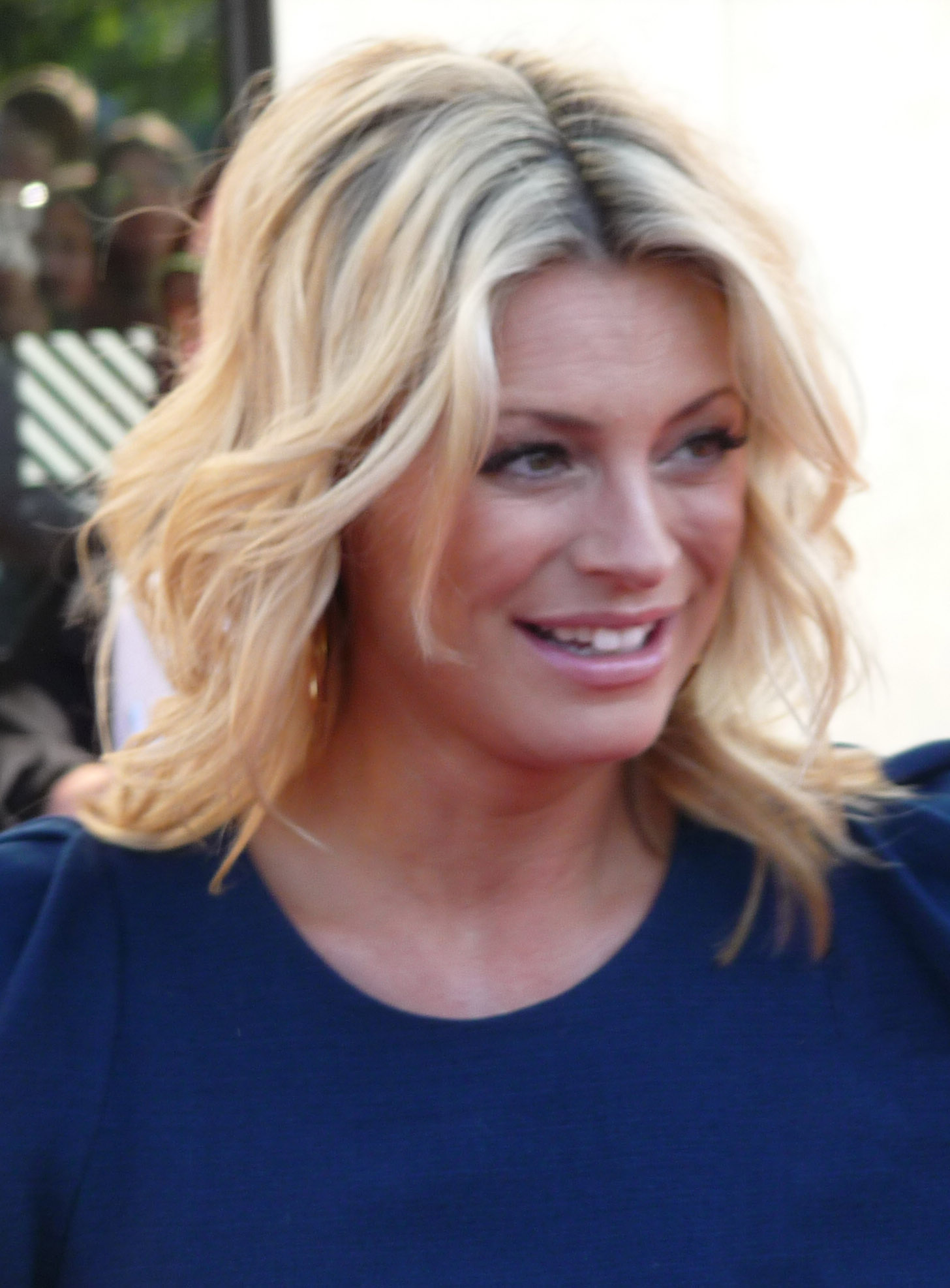
Tess Daly

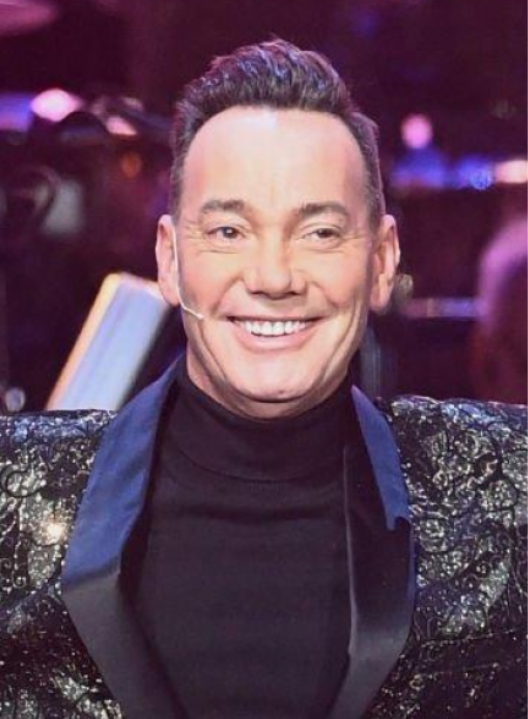
Craig Revel Horwood

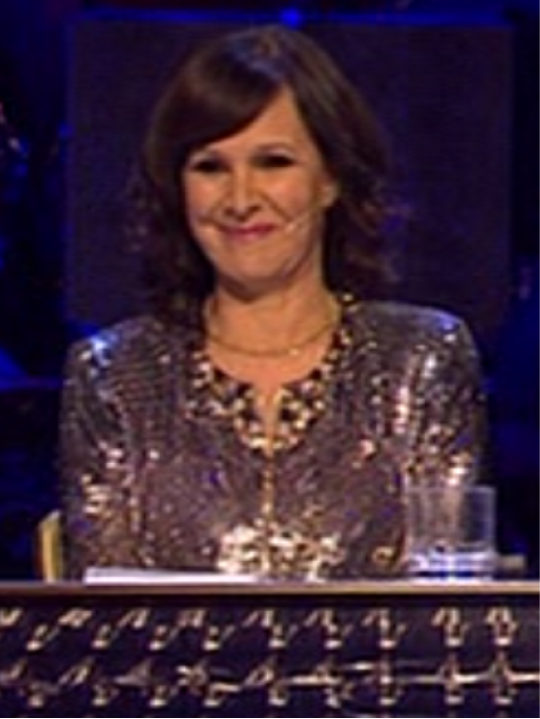
Arlene Phillips

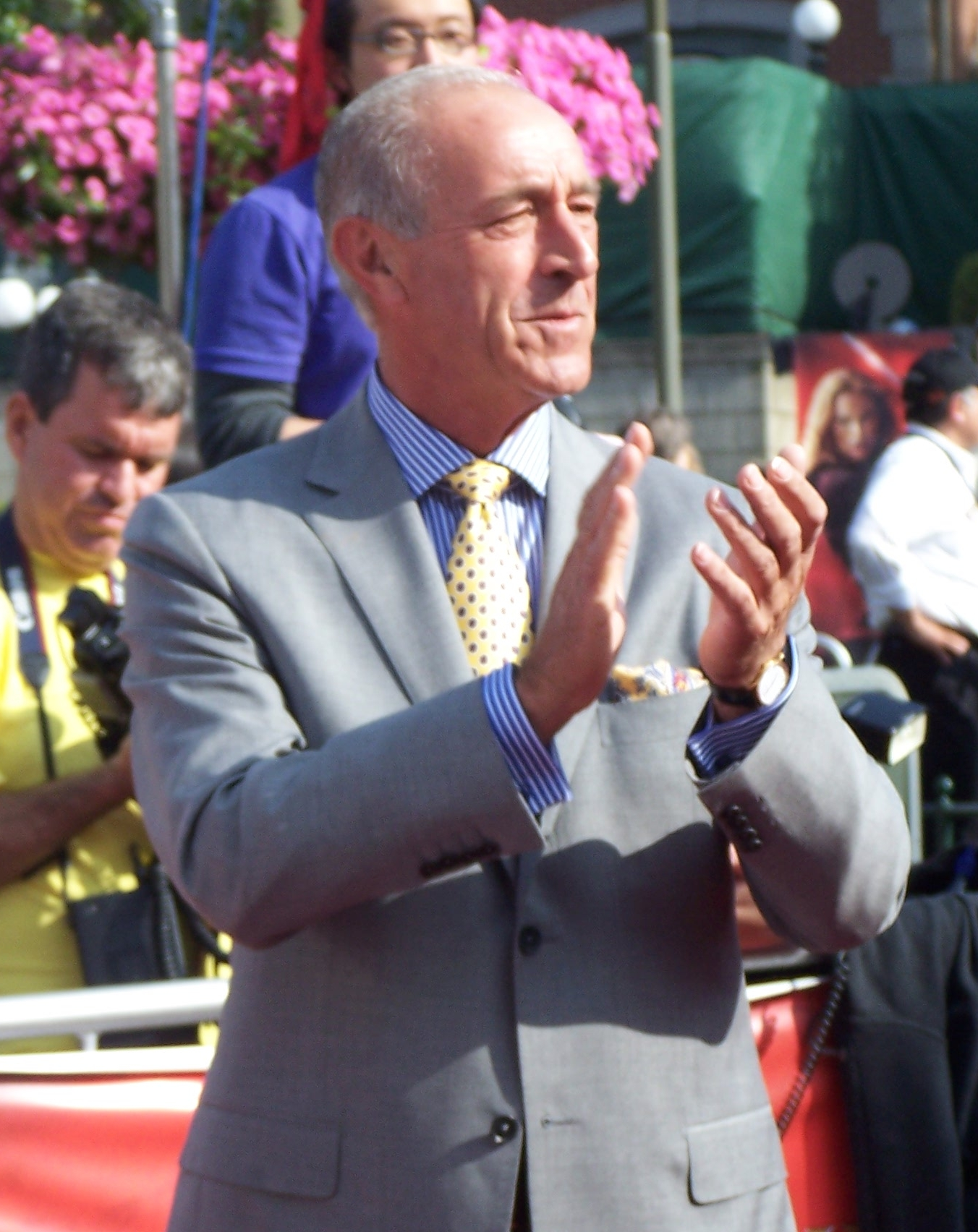
Len Goodman

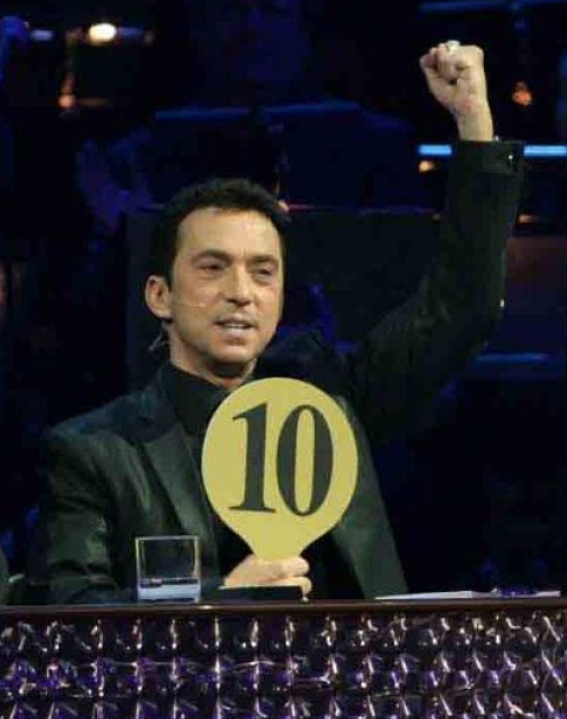
Bruno Tonioli

The couples dance each week in a live show. The judges score each performance out of ten. The couples are then ranked according to the judges' scores and given points according to their rank, with the lowest scored couple receiving one point, and the highest scored couple receiving the most points (the maximum number of points available depends on the number of couples remaining in the competition). The public are also invited to vote for their favourite couples, and the couples are ranked again according to the number of votes they receive, again receiving points; the couple with the fewest votes receiving one point, and the couple with the most votes receiving the most points.

The points for judges' score and public vote are then added together, and the two couples with the fewest points are placed in the bottom two. If two couples have equal points, the points from the public vote are given precedence.

== Couples ==
This series featured eight celebrity contestants.

Celebrity	Notability	Professional partner	Status
Jason Wood	Stand-up comedian	Kylie Jones	Eliminated 1st on 22 May 2004
David Dickinson	Bargain Hunt presenter & antiques expert	Camilla Dallerup	Eliminated 2nd on 29 May 2004
Verona Joseph	Holby City actress	Paul Killick	Eliminated 3rd on 5 June 2004
Claire Sweeney	Actress, singer & television presenter	John Byrnes	Eliminated 4th on 12 June 2004
Martin Offiah	England rugby player	Erin Boag	Eliminated 5th on 19 June 2004
Lesley Garrett	Classical singer	Anton Du Beke	Eliminated 6th on 26 June 2004
Christopher Parker	EastEnders actor	Hanna Karttunen	Runners-up on 3 July 2004
Natasha Kaplinsky	BBC News presenter & journalist	Brendan Cole	Winners on 3 July 2004

== Scoring chart ==
The highest score each week is indicated in bold green with a dagger (†), while the lowest score each week is indicated in italicized red with a double-dagger (‡).

Color key:

Winners
Runners-up
Bottom two
Eliminated

Strictly Come Dancing (series 1) - Weekly scores
Couple	Pl.	Week								
Couple	Pl.	1	2	1+2	3	4	5	6	7	8
Natasha & Brendan	1st	27	**31**†	**58**†	26 (Note: This couple was in the bottom two, but was not eliminated.)	**35**†	**37**†	31+36=**67**†	36+35=**71**†	36+31+35=**102**† (Note: This couple finished in first place.)
Christopher & Hanna	2nd	19	23	42	19‡	28	15‡	22+15=37‡	21+16=37‡	24+17+22=63‡ (Note: This couple finished in second place.)
Lesley & Anton	3rd	**29**†	27	56	29	30	27	34+26=60	33+29=62 (Note: This couple was eliminated.)	
Martin & Erin	4th	25	21	46	21	24‡	22	24+24=48		
Claire & John	5th	27	26	53	**34**†	31	32			
Verona & Paul	6th	27	24	51	24	24‡				
David & Camilla	7th	16‡	21	37‡	20					
Jason & Kylie	8th	21	19‡	40						

=== Average chart ===
This table only counts for dances scored on a traditional 40-point scale.

Couple	Rank by average	Total points	Number of dances	Total average
Natasha & Brendan	1st	396	12	33.0
Claire & John	2nd	150	5	30.0
Lesley & Anton	3rd	264	9	29.3
Verona & Paul	4th	99	4	24.8
Martin & Erin	5th	161	7	23.0
Christopher & Hanna	6th	241	12	20.1
Jason & Kylie	7th	40	2	20.0
David & Camilla	8th	57	3	19.0

== Weekly scores ==
Unless indicated otherwise, individual judges scores in the charts below are given (in parentheses) in this order from left to right: Craig Revel Horwood, Arlene Phillips, Len Goodman, Bruno Tonioli.

=== Week 1 ===
Couples performed either the cha-cha-cha or the waltz, and are listed in the order they performed.

Couple	Scores	Dance	Music
Natasha & Brendan	27 (5, 7, 8, 7)	Cha-cha-cha	"Chain of Fools" — Aretha Franklin
Lesley & Anton	29 (6, 8, 8, 7)	Waltz	"He Was Beautiful" — Cleo Laine
Christopher & Hanna	19 (4, 4, 7, 4)	Cha-cha-cha	"Lady Marmalade" — Labelle
Jason & Kylie	21 (5, 5, 6, 5)	Waltz	"Three Times A Lady" — Commodores
Verona & Paul	27 (7, 6, 7, 7)	Cha-cha-cha	"Respect" — Aretha Franklin
Claire & John	27 (7, 7, 8, 5)	Waltz	"Unchained Melody" — The Righteous Brothers
David & Camilla	16 (2, 4, 6, 4)	Cha-cha-cha	"Sex Bomb" — Tom Jones
Martin & Erin	25 (5, 6, 7, 7)	Waltz	"Come Away With Me" — Norah Jones

=== Week 2 ===
Couples performed either the quickstep or the rumba, and are listed in the order they performed.

Couple	Scores	Dance	Music	Result
Natasha & Brendan	31 (7, 8, 8, 8)	Quickstep	"The Lady is a Tramp" — Frank Sinatra	Safe
Martin & Erin	21 (3, 5, 7, 6)	Rumba	"Hero" — Mariah Carey	Safe
Christopher & Hanna	23 (5, 6, 6, 6)	Quickstep	"You're the One That I Want" — from Grease	Safe
Claire & John	26 (6, 6, 7, 7)	Rumba	"Angels" — Robbie Williams	Safe
Verona & Paul	24 (6, 6, 6, 6)	Quickstep	"If My Friends Could See Me Now" — from Sweet Charity	Safe
Jason & Kylie	19 (2, 5, 7, 5)	Rumba	"Leave Right Now" — Will Young	Eliminated
David & Camilla	21 (3, 6, 6, 6)	Quickstep	"Let's Face The Music and Dance" — from Follow the Fleet	Bottom two
Lesley & Anton	27 (6, 7, 7, 7)	Rumba	"You'll Never Find Another Love Like Mine" — Lou Rawls	Safe

=== Week 3: Blackpool Week ===
This week's episode was staged in the Tower Ballroom at the Blackpool Tower in Blackpool, Lancashire. Couples performed either the jive or the tango, and are listed in the order they performed.

Couple	Scores	Dance	Music	Result
Verona & Paul	24 (6, 6, 6, 6)	Jive	"Proud Mary" — Tina Turner	Safe
Lesley & Anton	29 (7, 8, 7, 7)	Tango	"Sensation" — Chong Lim	Safe
Martin & Erin	21 (5, 5, 5, 6)	Jive	"Great Balls of Fire" — Jerry Lee Lewis	Safe
David & Camilla	20 (4, 6, 5, 5)	Tango	"La Cumparsita" — Gerardo Matos Rodríguez	Eliminated
Christopher & Hanna	19 (5, 4, 5, 5)	Jive	"Do You Love Me" — The Contours	Safe
Claire & John	34 (8, 9, 9, 8)	Tango	"Roxanne" — The Police	Safe
Natasha & Brendan	26 (7, 7, 5, 7)	Jive	"Jump, Jive and Wail" — Louis Prima	Bottom two

=== Week 4 ===
Couples performed either the foxtrot or the paso doble, and are listed in the order they performed.

Couple	Scores	Dance	Music	Result
Claire & John	31 (8, 8, 7, 8)	Paso doble	"España cañí" — Pascual Marquina Narro	Safe
Christopher & Hanna	28 (6, 7, 8, 7)	Foxtrot	"Flying Without Wings" — Westlife	Safe
Verona & Paul	24 (5, 6, 6, 7)	Paso doble	"Boléro" — Maurice Ravel	Eliminated
Natasha & Brendan	35 (8, 9, 9, 9)	Foxtrot	"The Girl from Ipanema" — Antônio Carlos Jobim	Safe
Lesley & Anton	30 (7, 7, 8, 8)	Paso doble	"Scott & Fran's Paso Doble" — from Strictly Ballroom	Bottom two
Martin & Erin	24 (6, 5, 7, 6)	Foxtrot	"Let There Be Love" — Nat King Cole	Safe

=== Week 5 ===
Couples performed the samba and then a group Viennese waltz. Couples are listed in the order they performed.

Couple	Scores	Dance	Music	Result
Lesley & Anton	27 (7, 6, 7, 7)	Samba	"Mas que Nada" — Jorge Ben	Bottom two
Martin & Erin	22 (5, 5, 6, 6)	Samba	"Crickets Sing for Anamaria" — Marcos Valle	Safe
Christopher & Hanna	15 (3, 4, 4, 4)	Samba	"Soul Bossa Nova" — Quincy Jones	Safe
Claire & John	32 (8, 8, 8, 8)	Samba	"Shake Your Bon-Bon" — Ricky Martin	Eliminated
Natasha & Brendan	37 (9, 10, 9, 9)	Samba	"Love Is in the Air" — John Paul Young	Safe
Christopher & Hanna Claire & John Lesley & Anton Martin & Erin Natasha & Brendan		Group; Viennese waltz	"If I Ain't Got You" — Alicia Keys	

=== Week 6: Quarterfinal ===
Each couple performed two unlearned routines, and are listed in the order they performed.

Couple	Scores	Dance	Music	Result
Martin & Erin	24 (5, 6, 6, 7)	Quickstep	"It Don't Mean a Thing (If It Ain't Got That Swing)" — Duke Ellington	Eliminated
Martin & Erin	24 (6, 6, 6, 6)	Cha-cha-cha	"Smooth" — Santana	Eliminated
Natasha & Brendan	31 (8, 7, 8, 8)	Tango	"Libertango" — Astor Piazzolla	Safe
Natasha & Brendan	36 (9, 9, 9, 9)	Rumba	"Endless Love" — Lionel Richie	Safe
Christopher & Hanna	22 (5, 6, 5, 6)	Waltz	"I Have Nothing" — Whitney Houston	Safe
Christopher & Hanna	15 (3, 4, 5, 3)	Paso doble	"Bamboleo" — Gipsy Kings	Safe
Lesley & Anton	34 (8, 8, 9, 9)	Foxtrot	"I've Got You Under My Skin" — Frank Sinatra	Bottom two
Lesley & Anton	26 (6, 6, 7, 7)	Cha-cha-cha	"Spinning Around" — Kylie Minogue	Bottom two

=== Week 7: Semifinal ===
Each couple performed two unlearned routines, and are listed in the order they performed.

Couple	Scores	Dance	Music	Result
Lesley & Anton	33 (8, 8, 8, 9)	Quickstep	"That Old Black Magic" — Sammy Davis Jr	Eliminated
Lesley & Anton	29 (7, 7, 8, 7)	Jive	"My Baby Just Cares for Me" — Nina Simone	Eliminated
Natasha & Brendan	36 (9, 9, 9, 9)	Waltz	"With You I'm Born Again" — Billy Preston & Syreeta Wright	Safe
Natasha & Brendan	35 (8, 9, 9, 9)	Paso doble	"O Fortuna" — Carl Orff	Safe
Christopher & Hanna	21 (2, 6, 7, 6)	Tango	"Toxic" — Britney Spears	Bottom two
Christopher & Hanna	16 (2, 4, 5, 5)	Rumba	"Careless Whisper" — George Michael	Bottom two

=== Week 8: Final ===
Each couple performed three routines: their favourite ballroom dance, their favourite Latin dance, and their showdance routine. Couples are listed in the order they performed.

Couple	Scores	Dance	Music	Result
Natasha & Brendan	36 (9, 9, 9, 9)	Quickstep	"The Lady is a Tramp" — Frank Sinatra	Winners
Natasha & Brendan	31 (7, 7, 9, 8)	Samba	"Love Is in the Air" — John Paul Young	Winners
Natasha & Brendan	35 (8, 9, 9, 9)	Showdance	"(I've Had) The Time of My Life" — Bill Medley & Jennifer Warnes	Winners
Christopher & Hanna	24 (6, 5, 6, 7)	Waltz	"I Have Nothing" — Whitney Houston	Runners-up
Christopher & Hanna	17 (3, 3, 7, 4)	Jive	"Do You Love Me" — The Contours	Runners-up
Christopher & Hanna	22 (4, 6, 7, 5)	Showdance	"Fame" — Irene Cara	Runners-up

== Dance chart ==
The couples performed the following each week:

- Week 1: One unlearned dance (cha-cha-cha or waltz)
- Week 2: One unlearned dance (quickstep or rumba)
- Week 3: One unlearned dance (jive or tango)
- Week 4: One unlearned dance (foxtrot or paso doble)
- Week 5: Samba & Viennese waltz group dance
- Week 6 (Quarterfinal): Two unlearned dances
- Week 7 (Semifinal): Two unlearned dances
- Week 8 (Final): Favourite ballroom dance, favourite Latin dance & showdance

Strictly Come Dancing (series 1) - Dance chart
Couple	Week												
Couple	1	2	3	4	5		6		7		8		
Natasha & Brendan	Cha-cha-cha	Quickstep	Jive	Foxtrot	Samba	Group; Viennese waltz	Tango	Rumba	Waltz	Paso doble	Quickstep	Samba	Showdance
Christopher & Hanna	Cha-cha-cha	Quickstep	Jive	Foxtrot	Samba	Group; Viennese waltz	Waltz	Paso doble	Tango	Rumba	Waltz	Jive	Showdance
Lesley & Anton	Waltz	Rumba	Tango	Paso doble	Samba	Group; Viennese waltz	Foxtrot	Cha-cha-cha	Quickstep	Jive			
Martin & Erin	Waltz	Rumba	Jive	Foxtrot	Samba	Group; Viennese waltz	Quickstep	Cha-cha-cha					
Claire & John	Waltz	Rumba	Tango	Paso doble	Samba	Group; Viennese waltz							
Verona & Paul	Cha-cha-cha	Quickstep	Jive	Paso doble									
David & Camilla	Cha-cha-cha	Quickstep	Tango										
Jason & Kylie	Waltz	Rumba											

== Ratings ==
Weekly ratings for each show on BBC One. All ratings are provided by BARB.

Episode	Date	Official rating (millions)	Weekly rank for BBC One	Weekly rank for all UK TV
Week 1	15 May	4.61	20	40
Week 2	22 May	5.68	12	31
Week 3	29 May	6.07	11	28
Week 4	5 June	6.00	8	39
Week 5	13 June	5.37	11	29
Week 6	19 June	5.94	11	26
Week 7	26 June	7.00	13	22
Week 8	3 July	8.14	9	17
Week 8 results	3 July	9.28	7	10
Series average	2004	6.45	—N/a	—N/a
