= Hanna Karttunen =

Finnish professional Latin American and exhibition dancer

Hanna Karttunen (born in Oulu, Finland) is a Finnish professional Latin American and exhibition dancer. She also trained in ballet as a child, having a love of dance from a very early age.

Specialising in Latin American and representing England with Paul Killick, she won the titles of United Kingdom Open Champion, International Champion, World Series Champion, World Masters Champion, Dutch Open Champion, United States Open Champion, Asian Open Champion, Kremlin Cup Champion and also became the British National Champion four times.

Together they were also runner up in every major professional championship, such as the World Championship, European Championship and also the British Open Championship, where in 2002 they came close to taking the title, after being placed first in two out of five dances: Rumba and Pasodoble.

Before partnering Paul Killick, Karttunen also danced professionally with Sandro Cavallini for Italy, Geir Bakke for Norway and Rick Valenzuela for the United States. As an amateur competitor, she danced for her home country, Finland, becoming a national champion and international finalist with Jaakko Toivonen.

Karttunen has credited Markku Siltala and former world professional Latin American champion Espen Salberg as two of her main coaches throughout her career.

In 2004, Karttunen took part in the first series of the BBC Television show Strictly Come Dancing, where she partnered EastEnders actor Christopher Parker. Although they were regularly placed last by the judges, Parker's enormous fan base was enough to keep them in the competition right up to the final, where they were place second.

Since then, Karttunen has appeared as a guest performer on the show in Russia, South Africa, Italy, United Kingdom and the United States.

When Paul Killick announced his retirement from competition in May 2004, Karttunen went on to partner Victor Da Silva in the style of Exhibition. Representing South Africa, together they won the World Championships and the British Open Championships three times each. They were also invited to lecture and perform at some of the biggest and most prestigious dance events in the world.

Early on in 2008, Karttunen returned to the style of Latin American, partnering fellow champion Slavik Kryklyvyy. They represented Finland and danced only one competition together, the United Kingdom Open Championship in January 2009 where they placed 6th, before announcing the termination of their partnership just one year after it had begun.

Following this, Karttunen returned to Exhibition and resumed her former partnership with Victor Da Silva.

== Strictly Come Dancing performances ==
Series	Partner	Place	Average
1	Christopher Parker	Runners-up	20.1

=== Performances with Christopher Parker ===
Week	Dance & song	Judges' score				Total	Result
Week	Dance & song	Horwood	Phillips	Goodman	Tonioli	Total	Result
1	Cha-cha-cha / "Lady Marmalade"	4	4	7	4	19	No Elimination
2	Quickstep / "You're the One That I Want"	5	6	6	6	23	Safe
3	Jive / "Do You Love Me"	5	4	5	5	19	Safe
4	Foxtrot / "Flying Without Wings"	6	7	8	7	28	Safe
5	Samba / "Soul Bossa Nova"	3	4	4	4	15	Safe
6	Waltz / "I Have Nothing"; Paso doble / "Bamboléo"	5; 3	6; 4	5; 5	6; 3	22; 15	Safe
Semi-final	Tango / "Toxic"; Rumba / "Careless Whisper"	2; 2	6; 4	7; 5	6; 5	21; 16	Bottom two
Final	Waltz / "I Have Nothing"; Jive / "Do You Love Me"; Showdance / "Fame"	6; 3; 4	5; 3; 6	6; 7; 7	7; 4; 5	24; 17; 22	Runners-up
