= Camilla Sacre-Dallerup =

Danish dancer (born 1974)

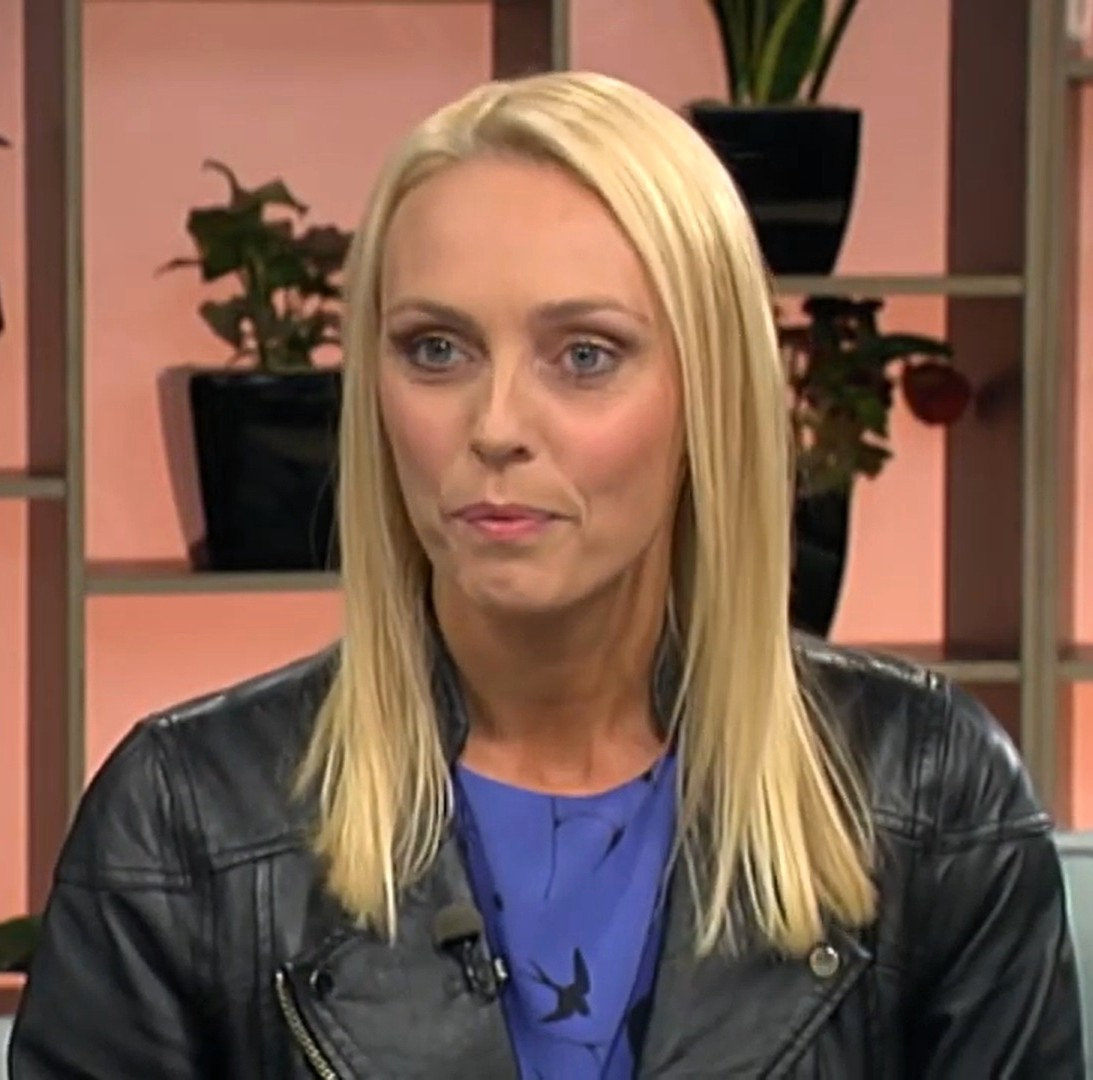
- Sacre-Dallerup in 2018
- Born: 6 April 1974 (age 51); Aalborg, Denmark
- Occupations: author, life coach and hypnotherapist, previously ballroom dancer
- Spouse: Kevin Sacre (m. 2010)
- Website: www.zenme.tv

Camilla Sacre-Dallerup (born 6 April 1974) is a Danish author, life coach, hypnotherapist and former ballroom dancer.

== Dance career ==
Dallerup was born in Aalborg, where she started dancing at the age of two and a half when her mother took her to her first class. She won the Danish Junior Championships at the age of 12. Dallerup later moved to London, United Kingdom, where she lived and competed with Brendan Cole, who also became her fiancé. In 2003, Dallerup and Cole were placed third in Latin American at the UK Closed Championships, and in the top 12 of the world professionals at the Open British Championships. From 2004, Ian Waite has been her professional dance partner and they were placed second in Latin American at the 2005 UK Closed Championships and in the semi-final of the International Championships at the Royal Albert Hall in 2004.

In September 2007, Dallerup and Cole represented the UK in the inaugural Eurovision Dance Contest 2007.

=== Strictly Come Dancing ===
Series	Celebrity partner	Place	Average Score
1	David Dickinson	7th	19.0
2	Roger Black	5th	23.6
3	James Martin	4th	26.5
4	Ray Fearon	8th	29.4
5	Gethin Jones	3rd	32.9
6	Tom Chambers	1st	34.5

Dallerup is best known to a wide audience for her appearances on the BBC's dance competition Strictly Come Dancing, on which she appeared as a professional dancer in the first six series from 2004 to 2008. She won the show for the first time in 2008, partnering Holby City actor Tom Chambers. She subsequently revealed she would not be returning to the show for the 2009 series. She did however go on tour with Strictly Come Dancing in early 2009 with 2008 partner Tom Chambers.

In January/February 2015, Camilla was a judge with Craig Revel Horwood and Tom Chambers on the Strictly Come Dancing Live UK tour where Tom and Camilla recreated their winning dance from 2008.

On 5 October 2009, on BBC Breakfast, she announced she would not compete in further series of Strictly Come Dancing.

=== Other television ===
In 2005, Dallerup co-hosted the CBBC show Dance Factory with Nigel Clarke and Reggie Yates. During her time as Gethin Jones' partner on Strictly Come Dancing, she made multiple appearances on Blue Peter. In 2008, she appeared as a contestant on the second series of The Underdog Show, finishing in third place.

On 1 September 2007, Dallerup represented the UK, the host nation, at the first Eurovision Dance Contest, placing fifteenth out of sixteen couples with 18 points. In 2009, she was a judge on Skate Nation for BBC Two and CBBC.

In November 2009, Dallerup entered the Australian jungle as a contestant on the ninth series of the British reality television series I'm a Celebrity...Get Me Out of Here!. Dallerup quit the show after being severely weakened by exhaustion and lack of food.

In 2010, she was a guest on Bill Bailey's Birdwatching Bonanza on Sky1. In 2014, she won an episode of Pointless Celebrities on BBC One.

== Other work ==
Dallerup joined a modelling agency at a very early age in Denmark. In 2006, she was the face and legs for Aristoc stockings.

She has acted as the head judge on the New Zealand version of Dancing With The Stars since its seventh season in 2018.

=== Acting ===
- 2011: Dallerup played the part of Elaine in Tim Firth's stage adaptation of the film Calendar Girls opposite her husband, Kevin Sacre.
- In pantomime she has played:
  - 2011: Genie, Aladdin in Milton Keynes, Buckinghamshire.
  - 2012: Fairy Godmother in Cinderella, Telford, Shropshire.
  - 2013: Fairy Godmother in Cinderella, Bridlington, East Riding of Yorkshire.
  - 2014–15: Fairy Godmother in Cinderella, Chesterfield Pomegranate Theatre, Derbyshire.
  - 2015–16: Fairy Godmother in Cinderella, Worthing Pavilion, West Sussex.

== Life coaching career ==
Sacre-Dallerup founded her own life coaching and mindful living business Zenme and lives in Los Angeles. She is the author of Strictly Inspirational (2015), a self-help book and autobiography, and Reinvent ME, a second self-help book, both published by Watkins Publishing. and is a life coach, hypnotherapist and meditation teacher.

== Personal life ==
Dallerup was in a relationship with her dance partner Brendan Cole for six years before the first series of Strictly.

Dallerup married Hollyoaks actor Kevin Sacre on 29 July 2010 in a ceremony in Ibiza and the couple live between Los Angeles and Walton-on-Thames in Surrey.
