= Paul Killick =

British professional ballroom dancer

- Born: United Kingdom
- Other name: Paul John Killick
- Occupations: Ballroom dancer, choreographer, television personality

Paul Killick is a British professional ballroom dancer and an International Latin American Dance Champion. He appeared in the first two series of the television show Strictly Come Dancing. Killick specialize in Latin dance and has won The World Cup, World Trophy, World Masters, World Series, Universal and British Professional Latin American DanceSport Championships.

Killick is also a choreographer, coach, television personality, dance judge, and the owner and director of the Arthur Murray International studio in Beverly Hills.

== Competitive dance career ==
Killick represented Great Britain in competitive Ballroom and Latin American Dancesport in the Juvenile, Junior, Youth and Amateur divisions. He won the title of World Amateur Latin Champion in 1993, dancing with Inga Haas.

In 1994, Killick began dancing professionally with Oksana Forova. In 1996, he began dancing with Vibeke Toft, participating in several competitions. In October 1998, Killick began dancing with Karina Smirnoff, and again participated in several competitions. This partnership ended in July 1999.

Killick then partnered with Hanna Karttunen. They danced together for five years and were highly ranked. Together they won the United Kingdom Open Champion, International Champion, World Series Champion, World Masters Champion, Dutch Open Champion, United States Open Champion, Asian Open Champion, Kremlin Cup Champion and four-time British National Champions.

Killick received the Ballroom Dancers' Federation "Most Outstanding Contribution to Dance" honour in both 1994 and 2004. He has won The World Cup, World Trophy, World Masters, World Series, Universal and British Professional Latin American DanceSport Championships on six occasions. Killick represented Great Britain throughout his career and has won several international DanceSport Championships before he retired from competitive Latin dancing in 2004.

== Other work ==
Killick has danced for the Royal Families of Monaco, Japan, Denmark, and the Prime Ministers of Germany, Finland, and Russia.

Killick was involved in the development and creation of "Strictly Come Dancing" on the BBC in the UK and appeared in seasons one and two of the series, as well as its spin-off, "Strictly Come Dancing: It Takes Two." In series 1, he danced with Verona Joseph, reaching the fourth round. In series 2, he danced with Carol Vorderman and reached the second round.

Killick choreographed productions for both screen and stage, including "Unforgettable Boleros" with Gloria Estefan, Ricky Martin, Celia Cruz and Ricardo Montalban for PBS; "Stephen Sondheim 75th Birthday Tribute Concert" at the Theatre Royal Drury Lane in London's West End and "An Evening of Ballroom Dancing with Paul Killick" at the Cadogan Theatre in London.

== Post-retirement ==
Killick is an adjudicator for several National and International Ballroom and Latin DanceSport competitions. He has organised multiple competitive DanceSport events, including The Killick Klassik DanceSport Event in Palm Beach, Florida, The Killick Royale Cup in Beverly Hills, California, The World Pro-Am Stars and The World Challenge DanceSport Championships in Hong Kong. Killick also coaches and choreographs for Ballroom and Latin DanceSport's competitors.

Killick was appointed as the Director and owner of the Arthur Murray International flagship studio in Beverly Hills. He also runs his own dance studio in London.

He is a member of the World Dance Council, the National Dance Council of America and the British Dance Council. He partnered with International Dance Shoes to produce The Killick Klassiks. Killick has also been involved with Childline, Cancer Research UK and Variety Club.
