= Celebrity Big Brother (British TV series) series 14 =

Celebrity Big Brother
- Series 14
- Series fourteen logo
- Presented by: Emma Willis
- No. of days: 26
- No. of housemates: 14
- Winner: Gary Busey
- Runner-up: Audley Harrison
- Companion shows: Big Brother's Bit on the Side
- No. of episodes: 26

Release
- Original network: Channel 5
- Original release: 18 August – 12 September 2014

Series chronology
- ← Previous; Series 13 Next → Series 15

Celebrity Big Brother 14 was the fourteenth series of the British reality television series Celebrity Big Brother. The series launched on 18 August 2014 on Channel 5 and ended after 26 days on 12 September. It was the seventh celebrity series and the eleventh series of Big Brother overall to air on the channel. Emma Willis hosted the series, whilst Rylan Clark presented the spin-off show Celebrity Big Brother's Bit on the Side along with Iain Lee, Willis and regular panelist Luisa Zissman.

The series was won by actor Gary Busey. With an average of 2.1 million, this series was the lowest watched series on Channel 4 or Channel 5 until Celebrity Big Brother 16 the following year. It was down 1 million on the previous January series. On finale night, it was revealed that the series would return in January 2015.

James Jordan returned to the house for Celebrity Big Brother 19 as an All-Star, representing this series. He was the fourth housemate to be evicted.

== Format ==
Celebrity Big Brother is a game show in which a group of celebrity contestants, referred to as housemates, live in isolation from the outside world in a custom built "house", constantly under video surveillance. During their time in the House, the housemates are required to nominate two of their fellow contestants for potential eviction, and the two or more with the most votes would be nominated. This process is mandatory for all housemates, and failure to comply could result in expulsion from the House. The public then vote, with one of those celebrities evicted from the house. When the final week arrives, the viewers vote for which of the remaining celebrities should win the series, and the housemate with the most votes becomes the winner.

During their time in the House, housemates are given weekly tasks to perform. The housemates wager a portion of their weekly shopping budget on the task, and either win double their wagered fund or lose the wagered fund depending on their performance in the task. The housemates are required to work as a group to complete their tasks, with the format of the tasks varying based on the number of remaining housemates. Throughout the series, some housemates have been given secret tasks that must either be completed individually or with a small group; failure to do so can result in the housemate being nominated or punished in the House. Should the housemates run out of the food provided for them, an emergency ration was available to them. The housemates are forbidden from discussing nominations, and doing so could result in punishment. The format of the series is mainly seen as a social experiment, and requires housemates to interact with others who may have differing ideals, beliefs, and prejudices. Housemates are also required to make visits to the Diary Room during their stay in the House, where they are able to share their thoughts and feelings on their fellow housemates and the game.

== Housemates ==
Celebrity	Age on entry	Notability	Day entered	Day exited	Status
Gary Busey	70	Actor	1	26	Winner
Audley Harrison	42	Heavyweight boxer	1	26	Runner-up
James Jordan	36	Professional dancer	1	26	3rd place
George Gilbey †	30	Reality TV star	1	26	4th place
Dee Kelly	42	Reality TV star	1	26	5th place
Edele Lynch	34	Singer	1	26	6th place
Lauren Goodger	27	Reality TV star	1	24	Evicted
Ricci Guarnaccio	27	Reality TV star	1	24	Evicted
Kellie Maloney	61	Boxing manager and former UKIP politician	1	19	Evicted
Stephanie Pratt	28	Reality TV star	1	19	Evicted
Frenchy	38	Model, actress and TV personality	1	17	Evicted
Claire King	52	Actress	1	16	Walked
Leslie Jordan †	59	Actor	1	12	Evicted
David McIntosh	28	Model and Kelly Brook's fiancé	1	10	Evicted

=== Audley Harrison ===
Audley Harrison is a British professional boxer from Harlesden, London, who currently fights in the heavyweight division. At the 2000 Sydney Olympics, he became the first British fighter to win an Olympic gold medal in the superheavyweight division and had also won gold at the 1998 Commonwealth Games. He stands at 6 ft, 5 1/2 in (1.97 m) and usually weighs around 255 lb (116 kg). He was the runner-up of this series.

=== Claire King ===
Claire King is an English actress, most notable for her role as Kim Tate on the ITV soap opera Emmerdale from 1989 to 1999, 2018–. Her other television credits include playing Karen Betts in Bad Girls, from 2000 to 2004. Her classic soap character in Emmerdale became popular on most television magazines, and gained her numerous awards including "Best Bitch" and "Best Exit". She was also one of the highest paid soap actresses on ITV. On Day 14, she left the house to receive medical attention, and on Day 16, it was announced that she would not be returning.

=== David McIntosh ===
David McIntosh is a British television personality, model, fitness expert, former soldier and security guard, in which he has more recently claimed to fame for being the current fiancé of Kelly Brook. He participated in the Sky 1 revival television series Gladiators, where he played under the alias name "Tornado". Since his career started, he appeared in the fitness magazine Muscle & Fitness, and in Jennifer Hudson's music video for her single, "Walk It Out". On Day 10, he became the first housemate to be evicted.

=== Dee Kelly ===
Deirdre "Dee" Kelly, better known as White Dee, is a British reality television personality from Birmingham, who is known for appearing on the Channel 4 reality documentary series Benefits Street. The show documented the lives of James Turner Street residents (including Dee herself), where 90% of the street claim the use of welfare payments. She became the first housemate to enter the house on Day 1 and was set a secret mission by "Big Brother", in which she had to disguise and pretend to be a royal family member called "The Duchess of Solihull", who was the 21st person in line to the British throne. In addition to this, she had to convince the final three housemates, Frenchy, Leslie, and Gary (all of whom live in the US), that she was royalty. She passed the task on Day 2. On Day 26, she finished fifth.

=== Edele Lynch ===
Edele Lynch is an Irish singer-songwriter, musician, dancer, and actress, who is best known as the lead singer of pop girl group B*Witched. Her twin sister, Keavy Lynch is also a member whilst her brother Shane is known as a member of boy band Boyzone. The girl group's first four singles, "C'est la Vie", "Rollercoaster", "To You I Belong", and "Blame It on the Weatherman", all reached number one in the UK Singles Chart. In 2012, the band reunited for an ITV2 documentary and tour, The Big Reunion. On Day 26, she left in sixth place.

=== Frenchy ===
Angelique "Frenchy" Morgan is a French television personality, actress, dancer, and model, best known for her appearances in VH1's reality shows such as Rock of Love 2, Rock of Love: Charm School, and the second season of I Love Money. She is currently working as a host on a television channel, and a radio blog. On Day 5, She was sent to The Celebrity Scrapheap as one of the least entertaining housemates along with Gary and therefore faced the first eviction. She was saved on Day 7 and chose James to replace her. On Day 14, she was nominated. On Day 17 she became the third housemate to be evicted.

=== Gary Busey ===
Gary Busey is an American actor, who is best known for his appearances in films such as Big Wednesday, Lethal Weapon, Point Break, and The Buddy Holly Story, for which he was nominated for an Academy Award as the main title role. He has also made a career in television by guest starring in popular shows like Entourage, Walker, Texas Ranger and Gunsmoke. On Day 5, He was sent to "The Celebrity Scrapheap" as the most boring housemate, meaning he automatically faced the first eviction. With 24 total nominations, Gary is currently the celebrity housemate with the highest number of nominations in CBB history, beating Jim Davidson's 22 nominations. On Day 26, he was announced winner of the series.

=== George Gilbey ===
George Gilbey was a British television personality, known for starring in the BAFTA Award-winning observational documentary series, Gogglebox on Channel 4. Gilbey appeared in the show since 2013, alongside his mother Linda and step-father Pete, as they give opinions of the country's biggest television shows airing. He left the house on Day 26 finishing in fourth place.

=== James Jordan ===
James Jordan is an English ballroom dancer and choreographer, who had competed as one of the male professional partners on Strictly Come Dancing, from 2006 to 2013. His dance partner and wife, Aleksandra "Ola" Jordan, was until 2015 one of the female professionals on the show. The couple became the first married duo to compete against each other, since his and Ola's debut on fourth series of the show. He started his dance training at the age of 13, turning professional in 2000. On Day 26, he left the house in third place. He later returned to compete in Celebrity Big Brother 19 as an All-Star housemate.

=== Kellie Maloney ===
Kellie Maloney is a retired British boxing manager, promoter, and UKIP politician, who is most notable for being the manager of heavyweight boxer Lennox Lewis. During her time in politics, priorities included combating crime and reducing immigration however, she did create controversy over allegations of homophobia and racism. Maloney announced publicly that she was undergoing a sex change and would be known as "Kellie". On Day 5, she was sent to "The Celebrity Scrapheap", and automatically faced the first eviction. On Day 19, Kellie became the fifth evictee, leaving in a double eviction with Stephanie. Maloney received the second fewest votes to save.

=== Lauren Goodger ===
Lauren Goodger is an English television personality, beautician, model, and singer, who previously starred in the ITV2 semi-reality programme The Only Way Is Essex, from debuting in the first series to her departure in sixth series. She dated fellow cast member Mark Wright from 2001 to 2012, dumping him in the second series finale of the show. On Day 24, she became the seventh housemate to be evicted, in a double eviction alongside Ricci.

=== Leslie Jordan ===
Leslie Jordan was an American actor and playwright, best known for his recurring role as Beverley Leslie on the hit American television sitcom Will & Grace. He received an Emmy Award for Outstanding Guest Actor for his portrayal of the character on the show. Since then, he has managed to become an accomplished stage performer and has acted in Broadway theater plays such as Sordid Lives, Found a Peanut, and Lucky Guy. He also had a one-man show and continued to have guest appearances on various American TV shows. On Day 12, Leslie became the second housemate to be evicted.

=== Ricci Guarnaccio ===
Ricci Guarnaccio is an English reality television personality, who is known for being as a cast member on the MTV reality series Geordie Shore, from series 2 to series 5. He is the former fiancé of fellow cast member Vicky Pattison. More recently, Ricci had taken part in the first series of Ex on the Beach, where he was face-to-face with Vicky once more. On Day 24, he became the sixth housemate to be evicted.

=== Stephanie Pratt ===
Stephanie Pratt is an American reality television star. She rose to prominence after being cast as a supporting cast member on the MTV reality series The Hills and later being promoted to a main member of the cast. She is the younger sister of Spencer Pratt and the sister-in-law of Heidi Montag, who competed as a couple on Celebrity Big Brother 11 in 2013. She has made several reality appearances on British television, including a starring role on Made in Chelsea. On Day 19, she became the fourth person to be evicted from the house.

== Nominations table ==
	Day 7	Day 10	Day 14	Day 17	Day 21	Day 26 Final		Nominations received
Gary	Not eligible	Leslie, Stephanie	Frenchy, Kellie	Kellie, Stephanie	James, Ricci	Winner (Day 26)		24
Audley	Not eligible	Leslie, Kellie	Frenchy, Stephanie	James, Edele	George, Dee	Runner-up (Day 26)		6
James	Not eligible	Leslie, Gary	Kellie, Frenchy	Kellie, Audley	Lauren, Gary	Third place (Day 26)		5
George	Not eligible	Frenchy, Gary	Frenchy, Gary	Audley, Gary	Audley, Gary	Fourth place (Day 26)		3
Dee	Not eligible	Gary, George	Frenchy, Stephanie	Edele, Gary	Gary, James	Fifth place (Day 26)		1
Edele	Not eligible	Gary, Frenchy	Frenchy, Gary	Gary, Kellie	Audley, Lauren	Sixth place (Day 26)		5
Lauren	Not eligible	Gary, Frenchy	Frenchy, Gary	Gary, Edele	James, Edele	Evicted (Day 24)		3
Ricci	Not eligible	Gary, Frenchy	Frenchy, Gary	Kellie, Gary	Gary, Audley	Evicted (Day 24)		2
Kellie	Not eligible	Gary, Leslie	Frenchy, Stephanie	James, Edele	Evicted (Day 19)			10
Stephanie	Not eligible	~~Frenchy,~~; ~~Gary~~	Gary, Kellie	Gary, Kellie	Evicted (Day 19)			6
Frenchy	Not eligible	Leslie, Audley	Ricci, Lauren	Evicted (Day 17)				14
Claire	Not eligible	George, Stephanie	Exempt	Walked (Day 16)				1
Leslie	~~Frenchy,~~; Gary, Kellie, David, Claire	Frenchy, Gary	Evicted (Day 12)					5
David	Not eligible	Evicted (Day 10)						1
Notes	1	2, 3	2, 4	2, 5	2	6		
Against public vote	Claire, David, Gary, James, Kellie	Audley, Frenchy, Gary, George, Kellie, Leslie, Stephanie	Frenchy, Gary, Kellie, Lauren, Ricci, Stephanie	Audley, Edele, Gary, James, Kellie, Stephanie	Audley, Dee, Edele, Gary, George, James, Lauren, Ricci	Audley, Dee, Edele, Gary, George, James		
Walked	none		Claire	none				
Evicted	David; Fewest votes to save	Leslie; Fewest votes (out of 4) to save	Frenchy; Fewest votes to save	Stephanie; Fewest votes (out of 4) to save	Ricci; Fewest votes to save	Edele; Fewest votes (out of 6)	James; Fewest votes (out of 3)	
Evicted	David; Fewest votes to save	Leslie; Fewest votes (out of 4) to save	Frenchy; Fewest votes to save	Stephanie; Fewest votes (out of 4) to save	Ricci; Fewest votes to save	Dee; Fewest votes (out of 6)	James; Fewest votes (out of 3)	
Evicted	David; Fewest votes to save	Leslie; Fewest votes (out of 4) to save	Frenchy; Fewest votes to save	Stephanie; Fewest votes (out of 4) to save	Ricci; Fewest votes to save	Dee; Fewest votes (out of 6)	Audley; Fewest votes (out of 2)	
Evicted	David; Fewest votes to save	Leslie; Fewest votes (out of 4) to save	Frenchy; Fewest votes to save	Kellie; Fewest votes (out of 4) to save	Lauren; Fewest votes to save	George; Fewest votes (out of 4)	Audley; Fewest votes (out of 2)	
Evicted	David; Fewest votes to save	Leslie; Fewest votes (out of 4) to save	Frenchy; Fewest votes to save	Kellie; Fewest votes (out of 4) to save	Lauren; Fewest votes to save	Gary; Most votes to win		

Notes

- ^Note 1: On Day 5, Leslie was voted via the Big Brother App as "Star of the Show". During the live show, he was chosen to pick two housemates to be banished to the Celebrity Scrapheap. He chose Frenchy and Gary. Big Brother then announced that all housemates living in the scrapheap would face eviction, and more housemates would join them. Later that day, Kellie was also sent to the scrapheap. On Day 6, Leslie sent David to the scrapheap meaning he too would face eviction. On Day 7, Frenchy saved herself in the "More or Less Celebrity" task and chose James to replace her. Following this decision, Leslie named Claire as the final housemate to be sent to the scrapheap.
- ^Note 2: Every housemate who received a nomination faced eviction.
- ^Note 3: Shortly after David's eviction housemates nominated face-to-face. After Stephanie made her nominations, Big Brother announced that they would be voided as punishment for discussing nominations.
- ^Note 4: After completing the 'dome' endurance task, Big Brother announced that Audley and James had both won immunity from the next round of nominations. Prior to nominations, Claire left the house temporarily to receive medical attention so was unable to nominate or be nominated. On Day 16, it was revealed that she would not be returning to the house.
- ^Note 5: Shortly after Frenchy's eviction housemates nominated face-to-face. In addition, this eviction was a double eviction. Stephanie and Kellie received the fewest votes to save and were both evicted on Day 19.
- ^Note 6: The public were voting for the housemate to win rather than to save.

== Summary ==
Day 1	Entrances	Dee, James, Claire, David, Kellie, Audley, Lauren, George, Edele, Ricci, Stephanie, Leslie, Frenchy and Gary entered the house.
Day 1	Tasks	Dee was told she had to act like a Royal for 24 hours and must fool the final three housemates; Frenchy, Gary and Leslie, who are American residents, into thinking she is the Duchess of Solihull and 21st in line to the throne. The other ten housemates were in on the hoax.
Day 2	Tasks	Dee continued her secret mission to convince the Frenchy, Gary and Leslie that she is the Duchess of Solihull. For the final part of the task, she was asked to choose one of them to become Viscount of Solihull. She chose Frenchy. After this, Dee's real identity was revealed to the house and the housemates were told they'd passed the task.; Each housemate was given two newspaper headlines about themselves, with one being true, the other being false. The other housemates had to identify which of the headlines was the truth, then the housemate in question had to explain themselves.
Day 3	Tasks	The housemates began their first shopping task; The Agents, where Leslie and Kellie were in charge of running a casting agency. The agents were provided with various job vacancies that need filling, where two housemates competed to get the job. To pass the task the winning audition videos had to accumulate a certain number of likes on the official Facebook page.
Day 3	Punishments	James was given an informal warning from Big Brother about treating Gary with more respect following comments made about his hearing.
Day 4	Tasks	The housemates continued with their shopping task. It was then revealed that they'd failed task and will receive basic rations.
Day 5	Twists	Leslie became "Star of the Show" after receiving the most votes via the Big Brother app for most entertaining housemate. He was granted immunity for the week and chose to banish Frenchy and Gary to the Celebrity Scrapheap. Big Brother then announced that all celebrities in the Scrapheap were automatically nominated for the first eviction.; Following Leslie's party, he chose to banish Kellie to the Scrapheap.
Day 5	Punishments	Frenchy was given a formal warning from Big Brother regarding her cutting up a pair of Leslie's underwear and for threatening to kick him.; Leslie was also given a formal warning for threatening to hit Frenchy in the aftermath of their dispute.
Day 6	Tasks	Claire, David and Edele took part in a talent show which was judged by Star of the Show, Leslie. After each performed their talents, Leslie had to decide which of the three had the least talent and would then be sent to the Scrapheap and would face the first eviction. He chose David.
Day 6	Twists	Leslie sent David to the Scrapheap meaning he faced the first eviction.
Day 6	Punishments	Kellie was given a warning for referring to Leslie as a "little queen who tries to cover his tracks" and also showing what was deemed as aggressive behaviour. Big Brother reminded Kellie that this behaviour could be offensive to the housemates and viewing public.
Day 7	Tasks	As Star of the Show, Leslie hosted "More or Less Celebrity" where he rated his fellow housemates on intelligence, talent, attractiveness and fame. The nominated housemates; David, Frenchy, Gary and Kellie then had to guess who was more or less out of a choice of two housemates. As Frenchy guessed the most correct answers she was saved from eviction, and chose James to take her place.
Day 7	Twists	As winner of "More or Less Celebrity", Frenchy saved herself from eviction. She then got the chance to nominate someone to take her place. She chose James.; Leslie had to select a fifth and final housemate to join the Scrapheap and therefore face eviction. He chose Claire.
Day 8	Tasks	For the second shopping task, the housemates faced their phobias for a predetermined amount of time. Big Brother told them that they must have a success rate of 75% to complete the task. Gary was informed beforehand that this is not the real task, and that he is set a secret mission to make the house think that he has a phobia of balloons.
Day 8	Punishments	Lauren was given a warning for urinating in the pool.
Day 9	Tasks	The housemates continued to face their phobias as part of the shopping task. As Gary failed to convince his housemates that he had a genuine fear of balloons, the housemates failed the task and received basic rations to live on.
Day 10	Exits	David became the first housemate to be evicted.
Day 10	Twists	Housemates nominated face-to-face. It was revealed afterwards that anyone who received a nomination would face the next eviction.
Day 10	Nominations	Audley, Frenchy, Gary, George, Leslie, Kellie and Stephanie received the most nominations therefore all face the second eviction.
Day 10	Punishments	As punishment for discussing nominations, Stephanie's nominations were voided.; Audley received a warning from Big Brother over his reasons for nominating Kellie.
Day 12	Tasks	Claire hosted a talk show called "Big Dummies" where three housemates became ventriloquists and three housemates became their puppets. James became the voice of Frenchy, Leslie became the voice of Stephanie and George became the voice of Gary. They had to answer questions asked by the remaining housemates.
Day 12	Punishments	Stephanie was given a caution over allegedly bullying Gary.
Day 12	Exits	Leslie became the second housemate to be evicted.
Day 13	Tasks	Housemates were split into two teams, with James and Audley as the team captains. James and Audley had to endure being under a dome in the garden for as long as possible and had to face temptations from Big Brother including a phone call from home, whoever won the task won a luxury dinner for their team and immunity from the next nominations, however neither of them left the dome and they both were granted immunity and a luxury dinner.
Day 13	Punishments	As a punishment for discussing nominations George and Stephanie were sent to the dome until further notice.
Day 14	Nominations	Frenchy, Gary, Kellie, Lauren, Ricci and Stephanie received nominations and therefore all faced the third eviction.
Day 14	Exits	Claire left the house to go to hospital for an unknown illness.
Day 15	Tasks	For the third shopping task, housemates were called to the counting zone (large task room) and had to count how many times they saw the Big Brother eye while Big Brother was distracting them in many ways including watching nominations, throwing a dinner party and having to answer questions in a quiz. Housemates had to get the number within fifty of the actual answer in order to pass the task, housemates completed this task successfully and therefore won a luxury shopping budget.
Day 16	Tasks	An online poll was posted on the Big Brother app asking who should do the Ice Bucket Challenge, the housemate with the most nominations had to have a large bucket of ice water tipped over them and then nominate another housemate to do the same. Frenchy received the most nominations and she nominated Lauren.
Day 16	Exits	It was announced that Claire would not be returning to the house.
Day 17	Tasks	Stephanie was set a secret mission into testing George's loyalty for her by becoming "Princess Pratt", Stephanie had an earpiece on and had to make George cater to her every demand. She completed this task and won cleaning products.
Day 17	Exits	Frenchy became the third housemate to be evicted.
Day 17	Twists	Housemates nominated face-to-face.
Day 17	Nominations	Audley, Edele, Gary, Kellie, James and Stephanie received nominations therefore faced the fourth and fifth eviction.
Day 18	Tasks	For the task housemates had to complete a survey about the other housemates stating certain things about them and how they could be improved. After the surveys were complete housemates had to read aloud what was said about them. The person that said this could own up and say why they said that or they could stay anonymous.
Day 19	Tasks	Gary became the counsellor for the day while the other housemates were called to the therapist's room to discuss with Gary certain aspects of life in the house. The housemates were given therapies like couple therapy, conflict therapy, positivity therapy and emotional therapy.
Day 19	Exits	Stephanie became the fourth housemate to be evicted.; Kellie became the fifth housemate to be evicted.
Day 20	Tasks	Housemates were given a new job in customer complaint centre, four housemates at a time had to deal with complaints about them from members of the public in a satisfactory manner and at the end of the call were asked to complete a customer satisfaction survey. Overall the customers were happy and housemates were rewarded with an office party.
Day 21	Tasks	
Day 21	Punishments	Gary was given a warning for nudity.
Day 21	Nominations	Audley, Dee, Edele, Gary, George, James, Lauren and Ricci received nominations and therefore faced the sixth and seventh eviction.
Day 24	Exits	Ricci became the sixth housemate to be evicted.; Lauren became the seventh housemate to be evicted.
Day 26	Exits	On the final night, Edele and Dee finished sixth and fifth, George finished fourth, and James finished third. Gary was announced as the winner of the series, leaving Audley as the runner-up.

== Production ==
=== Logo ===
The official eye logo was released on 6 August 2014 and features a similar design to Big Brother 15 but with the iconic star in the centre of the eye.

=== Live feed ===
Despite fifteenth series of Big Brother having only an hour and a half live feed for the entire series run, it was officially announced on 6 August 2014 that there would be an hour of live feed available almost nightly on Channel 5 due to the ratings success of the previous editions of the show and mass viewer request.

=== Teasers ===
On 11 August 2014, the first 30-second teaser was released which features footage from past series of Celebrity Big Brother on Channel 5. However, the tenth series or eleventh series are not included.

=== Sponsorship ===
SuperCasino continued its sponsorship for this series, after previously sponsoring the fourteenth and fifteenth series of the civilian series, and the twelfth and thirteenth series of the celebrity series.

=== House ===
The house was completely revamped ahead of the series and was given a "glamorous VIP makeover". Official house pictures were released on 18 August 2014, the same day as launch day. The diary room was coated in a gold sparkle style with gold screens either side of the chair. The control room below the diary room was removed as the 'Power Trip' theme from Big Brother 15 was discontinued. Detailed parts of the Celebrity Big Brother eye were placed all around the main parts of the house including the kitchen, living area, dining area and bathroom. the living area now had more comfortable seating unlike the black and green sofas for the civilians. In the bathroom the colour scheme had been changed to gold with the shower surrounded by a golden cover for the celebrities. In the garden the previous sunbed area had been moved over and was replaced by a seating area next to the pool. Coloured lines were also spaced throughout the garden making it look less bland than what it did look like in the last series. The bedroom wallpaper was changed to an orange city skyline with a new fluffy carpet and one extra bed for Gary Busey.

== Ratings ==
Official ratings are taken from BARB and include Channel 5 +1.

	Official viewers (millions)			
	Week 1	Week 2	Week 3	Week 4
Saturday		1.73	1.33	1.44
Sunday		2.09	2.11	1.65
Monday	2.61	1.84	1.95	1.91
Tuesday	2.04	1.93	1.94	1.89
Wednesday	2.13	2.02	1.91	2.09
Thursday	2.03	2.14	1.84	1.85
Friday	2.16	2.08	1.87	2.39
Weekly average	2.19	1.98	1.85	1.89
Running average	2.19	2.07	1.99	1.96
Series average	1.96			
blue-coloured boxes denote live shows.
