= Lauren Goodger =

English television personality (born 1986)

- Born: Lauren Rose Goodger; 19 September 1986 (age 40); Bethnal Green, London, England
- Occupation: Television personality
- Years active: 2010–present
- Television: The Only Way Is Essex; Dancing on Ice; Celebrity Big Brother; Celebs Go Dating
- Children: 2

Lauren Rose Goodger (born 19 September 1986) is an English television personality, known for appearing as a cast member on the ITV reality show The Only Way Is Essex from 2010 until 2012. She made brief returns to the series in 2015 and 2016 respectively, before returning permanently in 2024. Goodger was also a contestant on the eighth series of Dancing on Ice in 2013 and a housemate on the fourteenth series of Celebrity Big Brother in 2014.

== Early life ==
Lauren Rose Goodger was born on 19 September 1986 in Bethnal Green, London to Cheryl Goodger and Steve Norman. Her parents split when she was a year old and she was raised by her mother alongside her older half-brother Tony and half-sister Nicola until she was four, when she moved in with her father and his new girlfriend in Redbridge after Goodger's mother felt she would have a better upbringing. She has younger half-sisters Rianna, on her mother's side, and Hayley and Jenna on her father's side. She attended Roding Valley High School, where she met future boyfriend Mark Wright and they began dating aged 15.

== Career ==
=== The Only Way Is Essex ===
In 2010, Goodger became one of the original cast members of the reality television programme The Only Way Is Essex. The first two series of the show mostly revolved around Goodger's relationship with her boyfriend Mark Wright. In the final episode of the second series, broadcast in May 2011, she dumped Wright and pushed him into a swimming pool. Goodger made her initial departure from the show during the sixth series in 2012. She made a guest appearance in the series 16 Christmas special in 2015, before returning to appear in three episodes of series 19. In 2024, Goodger returned to The Only Way Is Essex for its thirty-second series and has appeared regularly again since.

=== Other projects ===
In February 2012, Goodger opened her own beauty salon Lauren's Way in Buckhurst Hill. It was petrol bombed shortly after opening to which Goodger said she "didn't deserve this just for being on a TV show" and that she was "devastated that individuals could vandalise my her shop [...] adding that she "didn't realise there were so many nasty and bitter people out there". It subsequently closed a year later.

In January 2013, Goodger took part in the eighth series of the ITV skating competition Dancing on Ice. She was partnered with Michael Zenezini and the pair were the second couple to eliminated from the competition, after losing the skate-off to Anthea Turner and Andy Buchanan. In February 2013, Goodger released her debut autobiography Secrets of an Essex Girl. In August 2014, Goodger entered the Celebrity Big Brother house to participate as a housemate on the fourteenth series. During her time in the house, she was linked romantically with Geordie Shore star Ricci Guarnaccio during their time in the house. On Day 14, Goodger was nominated by Frenchy, and therefore faced eviction. She survived this eviction on Day 17. On Day 21, Goodger was nominated again, this time by Edele Lynch and James Jordan. On Day 24, she became the seventh housemate to be evicted in a double eviction alongside Guarnaccio.

In 2019, Goodger appeared on the seventh series of the E4 series Celebs Go Dating. Goodger joined OnlyFans in 2020, and discussed her experiences on the platform in an episode of Olivia Attwood: Getting Filthy Rich in January 2026. Goodger has said that she doesn't enjoy being on OnlyFans, but does so for financial reasons. In July 2026, Goodger is set to release a second autobiography Mum of Two: Love, Loss and My Life on TOWIE.

=== Social media ===
Goodger has over a million followers on Instagram which she uses to market products. In 2019, she, along with Mike Hassini and Zara Holland, auditioned to promote a fictitious diet product containing cyanide. The drink was created as part of an investigation by the BBC Three series Blindboy Undestroys the World into Instagram influencers' irresponsible marketing of products they have never used. In 2024, Goodger was charged by the Financial Conduct Authority, alongside other influencers, in relation to promotions of unauthorised investments.

== Personal life ==
Goodger's relationship with boyfriend Mark Wright lasted for ten years. She fell pregnant during the relationship and had an abortion aged 19. They became engaged whilst starring on The Only Way Is Essex, before splitting in 2012.

Since 2020, Goodger has been dating Charles Drury. In January 2021, Goodger announced that she was pregnant with their first child. In July 2021, Goodger gave birth to a girl named Larose. In January 2022, Goodger announced that she was pregnant with their second child. In July 2022, Goodger revealed that their second daughter had died at two days old. In August 2022, Drury was charged with inflicting actual bodily harm on Goodger and was said to have used "controlling and coercive behaviour" during their relationship. The case was dropped after Goodger withdrew her support for prosecution.

== Filmography ==
As herself
Year	Title	Notes	Ref.
2010–2012, 2015–2016, 2024–present	The Only Way Is Essex	Series regular	
2013	Dancing on Ice	Contestant; series 8	
2014	Celebrity Big Brother	Housemate; series 14	
2017	In Therapy	1 episode	
2019	Celebs Go Dating	Cast member	

=== Guest appearances ===
- Daybreak (15 May 2011, 6 March 2012) – 2 episodes
- The Big Fat Quiz of the Year (27 December 2011) – 1 episode
- This Morning (16 May 2011, 3 January 2013, 14 January 2013, 15 February 2013, 1 August 2013, 12 June 2019, 1 April 2024) - 7 episodes
- Loose Women (16 May 2011, 4 January 2016, 3 August 2016, 26 January 2017, 15 September 2017, 1 March 2019, 24 September 2020) – 7 episodes
- The Wright Stuff (21 February 2013) – 1 episode
- 8 Out of 10 Cats Does Countdown (11 July 2014) – 1 episode
- Big Brother's Bit on the Side (17 July 2014) – 1 episode
- Celebrity Big Brother's Bit on the Side (10 September 2014, 11 September 2014, 12 September 2014) – 3 episodes
- Celebrity Juice (25 September 2014) - 1 episode
- Phillip's Live 24-Hour TV Marathon (1 December 2014) – 1 episode
- Most Shocking Celebrity Moments 2014 (28 December 2014) – 1 episode
- Celebrity Trolls: We're Coming to Get You (7 September 2017) – 1 episode
- Who's Doing the Dishes? (15 October 2015) – 1 episode
- Olivia Attwood: Getting Filthy Rich (18 January 2026) – 1 episode

== Bibliography ==
- Secrets of an Essex Girl (2013)
- Mum of Two: Love, Loss and My Life on TOWIE (2026)
