= Kellie Maloney =

Retired boxing manager, promoter and politician (born 1953)

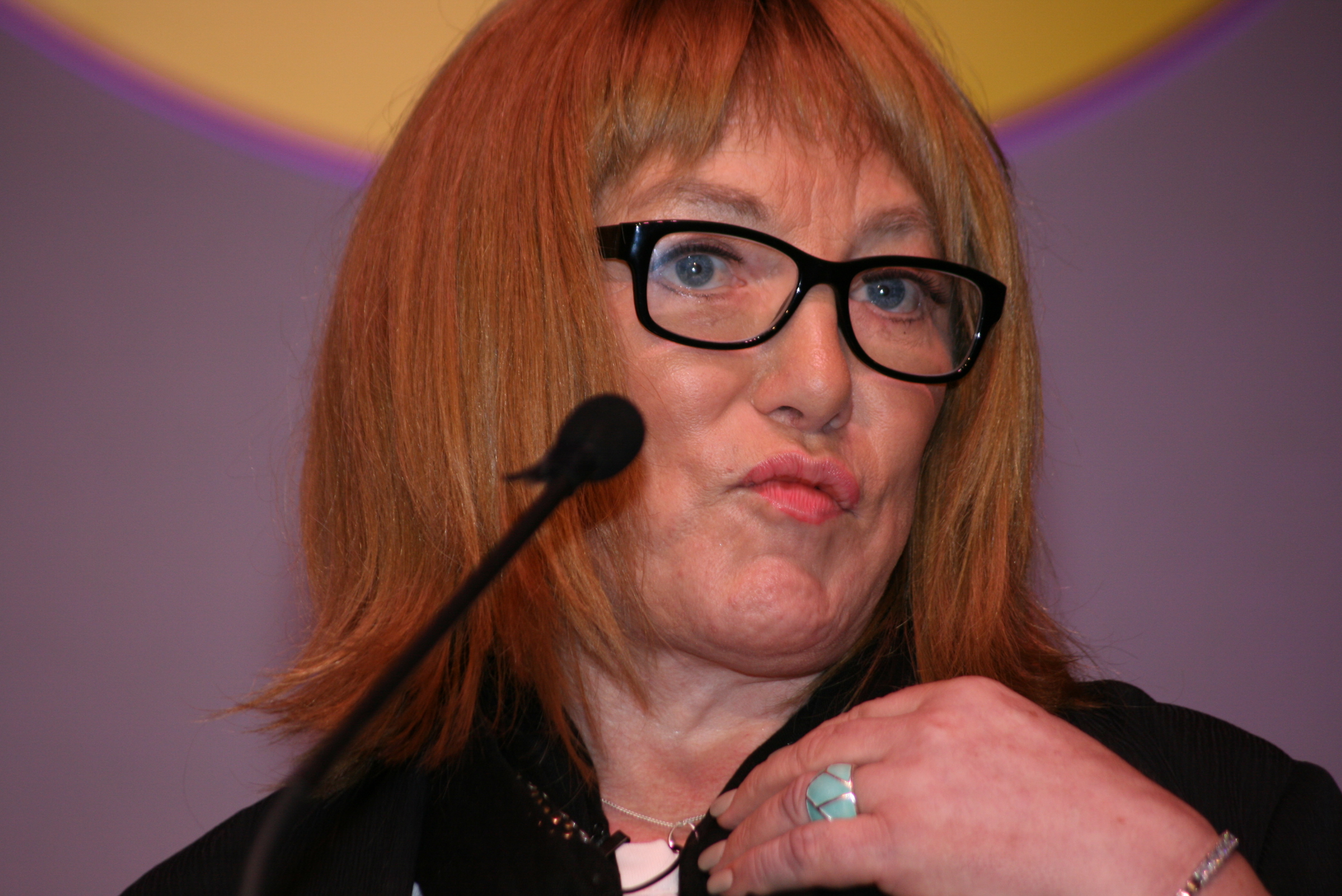
- Maloney in 2015
- Born: Francis Maloney; 23 January 1953 (age 73); Peckham, London, England
- Occupations: Boxing promoter; television personality
- Years active: 1989–present
- Political party: UKIP (formerly)
- Children: 3

Kellie Maloney (formerly Frank Maloney; born 23 January 1953) is an English boxing manager and promoter, and television personality. Maloney managed Lennox Lewis, who won the undisputed heavyweight championship of the world, between 1989 and 2001. This made Maloney the first Briton to manage a British heavyweight champion in almost a century.

In August 2014, Maloney announced that she wished to be known as Kellie, and was undertaking gender reassignment. The same month, she appeared as a housemate on the fourteenth series of Celebrity Big Brother. She has been described as one of the best-known transgender people in Britain.

== Boxing promotion ==
Maloney was born in London to Irish Catholic emigrant parents, Maureen from County Wicklow and Thomas from Roscrea, County Tipperary. She was raised as one of three brothers in Peckham, south London. Maloney's father encouraged her to pursue boxing, and Maloney took part in her first match aged 11. However, Maloney's small stature put her at a disadvantage, leading her to work as a boxing manager instead. By the late 1970s, her experience training other boxers and organising amateur competitions had led her to a career as a professional trainer, working with promoter Frank Warren. After splitting with Warren in the 1980s, Maloney moved into management and began promoting professional fights, becoming Lennox Lewis's manager in 1989.

While best known as the promoter who took Lewis to the top, Maloney has also guided four other fighters to World Titles and has managed a string of British, European and Commonwealth Champions. In 2009, the 'Boxing Binman', Rendall Munroe, made his fifth successive defence of his European Super Bantamweight title and later thrice fought for a world title, twice on an interim basis, drawing once and losing twice.

On 14 September 2009 Maloney suffered a heart attack while watching John McDermott lose a contentious decision to Tyson Fury; significant heart damage was discovered when Maloney was admitted to hospital with shock after finding the body of client Darren Sutherland following his suicide. It was reported that Maloney was not welcome at Sutherland's funeral service, although reports circulated that her wife, Tracey, and mother, Maureen, attended. Some of the evidence heard in the inquest into Sutherland's death was critical of Maloney, who Sutherland was said to be frightened of.

Maloney announced the decision to retire from boxing in October 2013.

In April 2015, Maloney announced that, following the completion of her gender reassignment, she would be returning to boxing to promote again.

== Other ventures ==
Following her gender transition, Maloney made a number of reality television appearances. In August 2014, a week after the news of her transition was announced to the media, she entered the Celebrity Big Brother house to compete as a housemate on the fourteenth series. She reportedly received a fee of £400,000 for her appearance on the show, and was ultimate the fifth housemate to be evicted on Day 19. She appeared in the 2019 series of Celebrity Masterchef. In June 2021, the first trailer for Knockout Blonde, a five-part documentary series about Maloney, was released.

== Politics ==
Maloney was the UKIP candidate for the 2004 London mayoral election, during which she was accused of "Griffin-like racism".

She was also criticised for comments about lesbian and gay people. These included the explanation that a failure to campaign in Camden was because there were "too many gays". Maloney later told the BBC: "I don't want to campaign around gays ... I don't think they do a lot for society ... what I have a problem with is them openly flaunting their sexuality." James Davenport, chairman of Gay Conservatives, called for Maloney's resignation as a UKIP candidate, saying: "Frank Maloney is a dangerous extremist and should resign or be sacked as UKIP's candidate for London mayor. UKIP must back or sack their homophobic candidate."

Maloney also stood as the UKIP candidate in the Barking constituency at the 2010 general election, finishing fifth of ten candidates with 1,300 votes (2.9%), thereby losing her deposit.

In a 2014 interview with LGBTQ magazine EQView, Maloney addressed her previous statements, stating: "I accept comments I made in the past were wrong. If you knew Frank Maloney, if you were there when I made those remarks – you would have seen the smirk on my face. I knew it was wrong but I was saying it in jest [...] it was a mistake."

In 2015, Maloney spoke at UKIP's Spring Conference in Kent, receiving a standing ovation.

Maloney later left UKIP, citing party leader Nigel Farage's stance on LGBTQ rights as the trigger for her withdrawing her support.

== Personal life ==
Maloney has been married twice, marrying her first wife, Jackie, aged 21. The couple had their first child shortly after.

She was married for over 15 years to second wife Tracey; they have two daughters. Maloney said in her first televised interview as an open trans woman that she and Tracey are now divorced, but that she has been "very supportive". In an interview with the Daily Mirror in 2015, Maloney disclosed that she once attempted to strangle her then-wife Tracey before her gender transition. She was quoted as saying, “I just lost it . . . I grabbed her and had my hands around her neck." “If [my children] hadn’t come into the room . . . I dread to think what might have happened.” Maloney wrote of the incident in her book, Becoming a Woman in a Man's World, published in 2015.

Maloney is Catholic. She is a supporter of Millwall Football Club.

=== Gender transition ===
Following threats from the press to out her, in August 2014, Maloney announced in the Sunday Mirror that she is now known as Kellie, and was undergoing gender reassignment. Lennox Lewis was initially shocked at the news but expressed respect for Maloney's decision. On a radio interview she discussed her family's reaction with her mother Maureen, who has reportedly been supportive.

Maloney had already received counselling, hormone therapy, and voice coaching. In April 2015, Maloney announced that her gender reassignment was now complete.
