= David McIntosh (television personality) =

British television personality

- Born: 10 December 1985 (age 40); Wigan, England
- Occupation: Television personality
- Television: Gladiators; Celebrity Big Brother; Famously Single; Bromans; Celebrity Ex on the Beach
- Children: 1

David McIntosh (born 10 December 1985) is a British television personality. A former Royal Marines commando, he was a Gladiator on the Sky 1 TV series Gladiators, under the name Tornado. In 2014, he participated in Celebrity Big Brother 14.

== Career ==
Born to a British mother and Jamaican father, McIntosh grew up in Platt Bridge, near Wigan. He went to Holy Family Primary School in Platt Bridge and then St Edmund Arrowsmith high school in Ashton in Makerfield. After school, McIntosh became a Royal Marines Commando, serving in Northern Ireland, Somalia, the Persian Gulf, and Afghanistan. Upon leaving the Marines, McIntosh appeared as "Tornado" on the Sky 1 show Gladiators.

Following Gladiators, McIntosh worked in security. In late 2013, McIntosh was doing security transportation on a badger culling operation, and after crashing a van loaded with dead badgers into a bus stop he received a traffic violation charge resulting in a court fine. McIntosh was also found guilty of driving for eight years with a license that had been revoked for a previous traffic violation.

In 2014, McIntosh appeared in fitness magazine Muscle & Fitness, and music videos for Jennifer Hudson's single "Walk It Out" and Nicki Minaj's single "Anaconda". In August 2014, McIntosh entered the Celebrity Big Brother house for a reported fee of £200,000. McIntosh was the first to be evicted from the house.

In 2014, private photographs of McIntosh in which he was naked circulated online. About that he wrote on Twitter: "So happy my naked ass brought joy to many boys & girls out der Im now gonna figure out a way to get more leaked, as my duty to humanity". McIntosh was involved in a Twitter spat with his then-girlfriend Kelly Brook following their publication. Later in 2016, McIntosh showed his bare buttocks on Instagram.

In 2017, McIntosh appeared on the E! reality dating show Famously Single. Later that year he played Doctore on the ITV2 Ancient Rome-themed reality television series Bromans, mentoring the contestants during physical challenges.

In 2020, McIntosh appeared as a cast member on the eleventh series of Ex on the Beach.
