= George Gilbey =

English reality television personality (1984–2024)

- Born: George James Gilbey; 7 January 1984; Barking, London, England
- Died: 27 March 2024 (aged 40); Shoeburyness, Essex, England
- Occupation: Television personality
- Years active: 2013–2024
- Television: Gogglebox; Celebrity Big Brother
- Children: 1

George James Gilbey (7 January 1984 – 27 March 2024) was an English television personality, best known for appearing as a cast member on the Channel 4 series Gogglebox. In 2014, he took part in the fourteenth series of Celebrity Big Brother where he reached the final and finished in fourth place.

== Career ==
In September 2013, Gilbey made his first appearance in the Channel 4 reality series Gogglebox debuting in the second series along with his mother, Linda, and his stepfather, Pete McGarry. The family were axed from the show in 2014 following Gilbey's decision to participate in the fourteenth series of Celebrity Big Brother, where he entered on 18 August 2014 and reached the final on 12 September finishing fourth overall.

In February 2016, Gilbey and his family returned to Gogglebox. In 2018, Gilbey left the show; Linda and Pete continued on the programme without him until 2020. Pete McGarry died of bowel cancer, at the age of 71, on 28 June 2021.

== Personal life ==
George Gilbey dated Gemma Conway, with whom he had a daughter (born 2016).

Gilbey was sentenced to community service for assault and criminal damage, against his girlfriend, in 2018. He was sentenced to three months in prison for drunk driving in 2019.

=== Death ===
On 27 March 2024, Essex Police responded to an incident "in which a man who was working at height had fallen and sustained an injury", at a warehouse in Shoeburyness where Gilbey was working as a self-employed electrician. An Air Ambulance was dispatched, but Gilbey died on scene aged 40. The incident was reported to the Health and Safety Executive. The following day, a man was arrested on suspicion of gross negligence manslaughter in connection with his death. He was released under investigation. On 22 April, an inquest at Chelmsford revealed that Gilbey suffered traumatic injuries after falling through a skylight while working on a roof.

== Filmography ==
As himself
Year	Title	Role	Ref.
2013–2014, 2016–2018	Gogglebox	Cast member	
2014	Celebrity Big Brother	Housemate; series 14	
