= Celebrity Coach Trip series 4 =

Celebrity Coach Trip
- Season 4
- No. of days: 10
- Winners: Lisa Maffia & Mutya Buena
- Runners-up: Charlotte Crosby & Josh Ritchie; James & Ola Jordan; Danielle Vitalis & Paisley Billings

Release
- Original network: E4
- Original release: 14 January – 25 January 2019

Series chronology
- ← Previous; Series 3 Next → Series 5

Celebrity Coach Trip 4, also known as Celebrity Coach Trip: Road to Benidorm, was the fourth series of Celebrity Coach Trip in the United Kingdom. On 21 June 2018, it was announced by Channel 4 that Celebrity Coach Trip would return after a seven-year hiatus. The series was filmed in July 2018 immediately after the conclusion of Coach Trip: Road to Barcelona. The series began airing on E4 on 14 January 2019 for 10 episodes and concluded on 25 January 2019 with Lisa Maffia & Mutya Buena winning the series.

== Contestants ==
Couple were aboard the coach	Couple got yellow carded	Couple won a prize at the vote
Couple were immune from votes	Couple got red carded	Couple refused to vote
Couple left the coach	Couple were not present at the vote

Couple	Trip duration (days)									
Couple	1	2	3	4	5	6	7	8	9	10
Lisa & Mutya (original 5)	Yellow card									Winners on 25 January 2019
Charlotte & Josh (original 5)			Yellow card							Second on 25 January 2019
James & Ola (original 5)					Yellow card					Second on 25 January 2019
Danielle & Paisley	Not on Coach						Yellow card			Second on 25 January 2019
George & Roxanne	Not on Coach									Third on 25 January 2019
Big Narstie & Stevo (replaced Jaymi & JJ)	Not on Coach									Third on 25 January 2019
John & Edward (replaced Bobby & Nadia)	Not on Coach								Red card	Eliminated 4th on 24 January 2019
Jaymi & JJ (replaced James & Sam)	Not on Coach							Red card	Eliminated 3rd on 23 January 2019	
Bobby & Nadia (original 5)				Yellow card		Red card	Eliminated 2nd on 21 January 2019			
James & Sam (original 5)		Yellow card			Red card	Eliminated 1st on 18 January 2019				

== Voting history ==
Couple won the series	Couple were yellow carded	Couple were not present at the vote
Couple were runners up	Couple were red carded	Couple won a prize at the vote
Couple were third	Couple were immune from votes	Couple refused to vote
Couple were fourth	Couple left the coach

	Day										
	1	2	3	4	5	6	7	8	9	10	
Lisa Mutya	James; Sam	Bobby; Nadia	Charlotte; Josh	Bobby; Nadia	James; Ola	Bobby; Nadia	Danielle; Paisley	Jaymi; JJ	John; Edward	Danielle; Paisley	Winners (3 votes)
Lisa Mutya	James; Sam	Bobby; Nadia	Charlotte; Josh	Bobby; Nadia	James; Sam	Bobby; Nadia	Danielle; Paisley	Jaymi; JJ	John; Edward	Danielle; Paisley	Winners (3 votes)
Charlotte Josh	Lisa; Mutya	James; Sam	James; Ola	Bobby; Nadia	James; Ola	Bobby; Nadia	Danielle; Paisley	Jaymi; JJ	John; Edward	James; Ola	Second (1 vote)
Charlotte Josh	Lisa; Mutya	James; Sam	James; Ola	Bobby; Nadia	Lisa; Mutya	Bobby; Nadia	Danielle; Paisley	Jaymi; JJ	John; Edward	James; Ola	Second (1 vote)
James Ola	Bobby; Nadia	James; Sam	Charlotte; Josh	Bobby; Nadia	Lisa; Mutya	Bobby; Nadia	Danielle; Paisley	Jaymi; JJ	John; Edward	Charlotte; Josh	Second (1 vote)
James Ola	Bobby; Nadia	James; Sam	Charlotte; Josh	Bobby; Nadia	James; Sam	Bobby; Nadia	Danielle; Paisley	Jaymi; JJ	John; Edward	Charlotte; Josh	Second (1 vote)
Danielle Paisley	Not on Coach			James; Ola	James; Ola	Charlotte; Josh	Charlotte; Josh	Jaymi; JJ	John; Edward	Lisa; Mutya	Second (1 vote)
Danielle Paisley	Not on Coach			James; Ola	James; Sam	Charlotte; Josh	Charlotte; Josh	Jaymi; JJ	John; Edward	Lisa; Mutya	Second (1 vote)
George Roxanne	Not on Coach							Charlotte; Josh	John; Edward	Lisa; Mutya	Third (0 votes)
Big Narstie Stevo	Not on Coach								John; Edward	Lisa; Mutya	Third (0 votes)
John Edward	Not on Coach						James; Ola	James; Ola	James; Ola	Red Carded (Day 9)	
Jaymi JJ	Not on Coach					Danielle; Paisley	Danielle; Paisley	Charlotte; Josh	Red Carded (Day 8)		
Bobby Nadia	Lisa; Mutya	James; Ola	Charlotte; Josh	James; Ola	James; Ola	Danielle; Paisley	Red Carded (Day 6)				
Bobby Nadia	Lisa; Mutya	James; Ola	Charlotte; Josh	James; Ola	James; Sam	Danielle; Paisley	Red Carded (Day 6)				
James Sam	Lisa; Mutya	Charlotte; Josh	Bobby; Nadia	James; Ola	James; Ola	Red Carded (Day 5)					
James Sam	Lisa; Mutya	Charlotte; Josh	Bobby; Nadia	James; Ola	Lisa; Mutya	Red Carded (Day 5)					
Notes	None				^{1}	None		^{2}	^{3}	None	
Voted Off	Lisa; Mutya; 3 votes	James; Sam; 2 votes	Charlotte; Josh; 3 votes	Bobby; Nadia; 3 votes	James; Ola; 5 votes	Bobby; Nadia; 3 votes	Danielle; Paisley; 4 votes	Jaymi; JJ; 4 votes	John; Edward; 1 vote	None	
Voted Off	Lisa; Mutya; 3 votes	James; Sam; 2 votes	Charlotte; Josh; 3 votes	Bobby; Nadia; 3 votes	James; Sam; 4 votes	Bobby; Nadia; 3 votes	Danielle; Paisley; 4 votes	Jaymi; JJ; 4 votes	John; Edward; 1 vote	None	

=== Notes ===
^1 On Day 5, Brendan announced that the vote would be a double yellow card vote, meaning each couple would vote twice.

^2 On Day 8, Brendan announced that from now on, the couple with the most votes would receive an instant red card.

^3 On Day 9, Brendan announced that all couples would vote as normal, however only one couple's vote selected at random would count, and that the couple they had voted for would receive an instant red card. Brendan opened an envelope with Lisa & Mutya's name enclosed which meant that their vote for John & Edward gave them the red card.

== The trip by day ==
Day	Location	Activity	
Day	Location	Morning	Afternoon
1	Barcelona	Foot art class	BMX racing
2	Sitges	Standup paddleboarding	Drag show
3	Tarragona	Sea kayaking	Zip wire
4	Tortosa	Wakeboarding	Survival masterclass
5	Benicàssim	Go-karting	Skygliding
6	Valencia	Life drawing	Water zorbing
7	Valencia	Paella making	Blobbing
8	Dénia	Subwing diving	Wine tasting
9	Altea	Donkey sanctuary	Flyboarding
10	Benidorm	Water park	Flamenco dancing
