= St John Fisher Catholic School =

St John Fisher Catholic Comprehensive School

Location
- City Way; Rochester, Kent, ME1 2FA; England; 51°22′43″N 0°30′43″E

Information
- Other name: SJF
- Type: Voluntary aided school
- Motto: Latin: Deo Reddite Dei (Give back to God what belongs to God)
- Religious affiliation: Roman Catholic
- Patron saint: John Fisher
- Established: 1964
- Local authority: Medway Council
- Oversight: Archdiocese of Southwark
- Department for Education URN: 118908 Tables
- Ofsted: Reports
- Gender: Mixed
- Age range: 11–18
- Enrolment: 833 (2020)
- Capacity: 1,185
- Website: stjohnfisher.school

St John Fisher Catholic Comprehensive School (simply referred to as SJF) is an 11–18 mixed, Roman Catholic, voluntary aided secondary school and sixth form in Rochester, Kent, England. It was established in 1964 and is located in the Archdiocese of Southwark.

It is one of two genuine comprehensive schools in Medway, an authority that retains selection. Pupils also travel in from Sittingbourne and Sheppey in Kent. It is the only Catholic secondary school within the local authority and the only secondary school with two campuses. The main campus at Ordnance Street is for year 9 to 13, while years 7 and 8 are on a campus known as the Lower School, at Maidstone Road.

Planning permission was given in March 2021, for the school to consolidate on a single site on City Way on existing playing fields.

== Motto ==
The school's motto, Latin: Deo Reddite Dei means 'give back to God what belongs to God'.(Mark 12:17) This is a biblical reference referring to when Jesus was challenged by the Pharisees on the subject of taxation; Jesus was asked whether the Jews should pay taxes to the Romans or not.

== History ==
St John Fisher Catholic School was established in 1964 and is named after John Fisher, the Catholic bishop, Cardinal and martyr.

== Academics ==
The school operates a two-year Key Stage 3 which is provided on the Maidstone Road site. This is designed to build on the 'good work' of teachers in the principal feeder schools.

Students transfer to the Ordnance Street site for the three year Key Stage 4.

== Sixth Form Centre ==
Until the summer of 2010, the school's sixth form site was located at a separate building further up the road. It is now located at the main school site. Students are offered 21 A Levels and BTEC Level 3 courses.

== Partner primary schools ==
In case of oversubscription, priority goes to Catholic children and then to non-Catholics who have attended the following schools:

- English Martyrs’, Strood
- St Augustine of Canterbury, Rainham
- St Benedict’s, Lordswood
- St Edward’s, Sheppey
- St Mary’s, Gillingham
- St Michael’s, Chatham
- St Peter’s, Sittingbourne
- St Thomas More, Walderslade
- St Thomas of Canterbury, Rainham
- St William of Perth, Rochester

== Notable alumni ==
- James Jordan, ballroom dancer and choreographer
- Jimmy Corbett, professional footballer
