= Bromans =

- Genre: Reality competition
- Created by: Shaun Parry; Natalie McArdle; Peter Howell; Matt Marsh
- Presented by: Roman Kemp
- Starring: Tom Bell; David McIntosh
- Country of origin: United Kingdom
- No. of seasons: 1
- No. of episodes: 8

Production
- Executive producers: Ben Kelly; Karl Warner; Meredith Chambers
- Running time: 42 minutes
- Production company: Electric Ray Limited

Original release
- Network: ITV2
- Release: 14 September – 2 November 2017

Bromans is a British reality television series on ITV2. The contestants compete against each other in Ancient Rome-themed physical challenges. Their girlfriends join them to provide support and also compete in their own contests. The winning "gladiator" receives £10,000.

The gladiators are overseen by the emperor's right-hand man, Dominus, played by Tom Bell, and mentored by Doctore, played by David McIntosh. They meet with the unseen Emperor each week and select two gladiators for banishment. The other contestants choose who they want to remain in competition, and the gladiator with the least support is eliminated. It all concludes with the final four gladiators competing in the Emperor's Games, where a series of challenges determine the overall winner.

The series was cancelled in April 2018.

== Contestants ==
Name	Age	Residence	Episode entered	Episode exited	Result
Tom Trotter; Rhiannon Bailey	22; 21	London	1	8	WINNER
Dino Portelli; Cherelle Perfect	24; 24	Essex	1	8	Runner-Up
Brandon Myers; Nicola Tyas	20; 20	Kent	1	8	Third Place
Jordan Taylor; Jade Garbett	25; 24	Leeds	1	8	Fourth Place
Callum Ancrum; Rachel	27; 25	Newcastle	3	7	Banished
Glenn Klauber; Summer Fox	22; 19	London	1	6	Banished
Liam McAleese; Elle Hargreaves	29; 23	Nottingham	2	5	Banished
Chet Johnson; Helen Briggs	26; 20	Manchester	5	5	Banished
Tian Delgado; Natalie Hillyard	21; 33	Northampton	1	4	Banished
Kai LePine; Modina Shokeye	26; 21	Essex	1	2	Banished
Richard Cull; Sophii Vassallo	24; 26	Cardiff	1	1	Banished

== Contestant Progress ==
Gladiator Elimination Table
Gladiators	1	2	3^{1}	4^{2}	5^{3}	6	7	8	Eliminated Episode
Tom	WIN	WIN	IN	WIN	IN	IN	IN	WINNER	Episode 8
Dino	IN	IN	IN	WIN	WIN	WIN	WIN	RUNNER-UP	Episode 8
Brandon	IN	IN	IN	WIN	LOW	WIN	LOW	3RD PLACE	Episode 8
Jordan	IN	IN	LOW	WIN	IN	LOW	IN	4TH PLACE	Episode 8
Callum	—	—	IN	IN	IN	WIN	OUT		Episode 7
Glenn	LOW	IN	IN	LOW	IN	OUT			Episode 6
Liam	—	IN	SAFE	IN	OUT				Episode 5
Chet	—	—	—	—	OUT				Episode 5
Tian	IN	LOW	WIN	OUT					Episode 4
Kai	IN	OUT							Episode 2
Richard	OUT								Episode 1

^1: Jordan and Liam were put up for banishment. Liam was voted off, but the Emperor spared him.
^2: Glenn and Tian received equal support in the contestants' vote. The Emperor was the tiebreaker, banishing Tian.
^3: After his girlfriend Helen physically attacked another contestant, Chet was banished by the Emperor without a vote.

The gladiator won Bromans.
The gladiator won the main challenge.
The gladiator was in the bottom two, but was not banished.
The gladiator was to be banished, but was spared by the Emperor.
The gladiator was banished from the competition.

== Episodes ==
=== Episode 1 ===
Original airdate: 14 September 2017

The eight gladiators are introduced and then stripped naked, as their girlfriends dig for sacks of clothes to dress them.

- Challenge: Gladiators must deliver rocks, and then carry their girlfriends, by pulling a chariot in the fastest time.
  - WINNER: Tom
  - ELIMINATED: Richard

=== Episode 2 ===
Original airdate: 21 September 2017

Liam and Ellie join the group. The gladiators go head to head and must be the first to carry a sandbag to their side of the arena. Meanwhile, the girls crush grapes to make wine.

- Challenge: Using pugil sticks, gladiators fight to be the last man standing.
  - WINNER: Tom
  - ELIMINATED: Kai

=== Episode 3 ===
Original airdate: 28 September 2017

Callum and Rachel join the group. The gladiators must impress Doctore in an intense workout session; Brandon and Glenn are named the standouts. The girls use plaster to sculpt a body part, which their boyfriend must match to them.

- Challenge: In head to head competitions, gladiators must score hits on their opponent using a slingshot. The gladiator with the most overall hits wins.
  - WINNER: Tian
  - ELIMINATED: None (Jordan and Liam were put up for banishment. Liam was voted off, but was spared by the Emperor.)

=== Episode 4 ===
Original airdate: 5 October 2017

Jordan and Liam are imprisoned and their girlfriends Jade and Ellie take their places in the first challenge. The gladiators must race across a pool of water and be the first to deliver two sandbags to their pedestal. Later, the girls prepare rabbit for dinner with mixed results.

- Challenge: The gladiators are greased up and must wrestle their opponent out of the arena. The match-ups were Dino vs. Tian, Brandon vs. Glenn, Liam vs. Tom, and Callum vs. Jordan.
  - WINNERS: Dino, Brandon, Tom, Jordan
  - ELIMINATED: Tian

=== Episode 5 ===
Original airdate: 12 October 2017

Chet and Helen join the group and immediately butt heads with the other contestants. The gladiators are shackled together as pairs. The girls are also paired off, competing to entertain the Emperor; Ellie and Summer are named the winners. Nicola attacks Helen verbally ending in Helen reacting and she and Chet do not participate in the main challenge.

- Challenge: The gladiators must be the first to cross the cesspit three times, delivering two sandbags and finally their girlfriends.
  - WINNER: Dino
  - ELIMINATED: Chet, Liam

=== Episode 6 ===
Original airdate: 19 October 2017

The gladiators are blindfolded and use pugil sticks to knock their opponent out of the arena; Callum, Jordan and Tom beat Brandon, Glenn and Dino in the matchups. The couples must use urine to wash the Emperor's clothes; Dino and Cherelle are rewarded.

- Challenge: In head to head competitions, the gladiators must hold their girlfriends, who are suspended over the cesspit, longer than their opponent.
  - WINNERS: Brandon, Callum, Dino
  - ELIMINATED: Glenn

=== Episode 7 ===
Original airdate: 26 October 2017

In the final week before the Emperor's Games, Doctore challenges the men to intense training in the arena and names Tom the standout. The girlfriends give the gladiators a spa treatment.

- Challenge: In a repeat of the very first challenge, the gladiators must deliver rocks, and then carry their girlfriends, by pulling a chariot in the fastest time.
  - WINNER: Dino
  - ELIMINATED: Callum

=== Episode 8 ===
Original airdate: 2 November 2017

In the season finale, Doctore presents the gladiators with their own armour. The girls battle at the cesspit and must deliver two sandbags to their platform; Cherelle wins and selects Brandon as Dino's opponent for round one. The gladiators mould their penises to create fascinum.

The Emperor's Games

- Round One: Blindfolded and fitted with bells, the gladiators must knock their opponent out of the arena.
  - MATCHUPS: Jordan vs. Tom; Brandon vs. Dino; Dino vs. Jordan
  - ELIMINATED: Jordan
- Round Two: Gladiators must carry three sandbags across the arena to advance, but there are only eight sandbags total.
  - MATCHUP: Brandon vs. Dino vs. Tom
  - ELIMINATED: Brandon
- Round Three: The gladiators must remove the leather strap from their opponent's ankle and return it to their end of the arena.
  - MATCHUP: Dino vs. Tom
  - WINNER: Tom
  - ELIMINATED: Dino
