= Strictly Come Dancing series 6 =

Strictly Come Dancing
- Series 6
- Presented by: Bruce Forsyth; Tess Daly
- Judges: Len Goodman; Arlene Phillips; Craig Revel Horwood; Bruno Tonioli
- Celebrity winner: Tom Chambers
- Professional winner: Camilla Sacre-Dallerup
- No. of episodes: 28

Release
- Original network: BBC One
- Original release: 20 September – 20 December 2008

Series chronology
- ← Previous; Series 5 Next → Series 7

Strictly Come Dancing returned for its sixth series on 20 September 2008 on BBC One. Bruce Forsyth and Tess Daly returned as co-presenters of the main show on BBC One, while Claudia Winkleman returned to present the spin-off show Strictly Come Dancing: It Takes Two on BBC Two. Len Goodman, Arlene Phillips, Craig Revel Horwood, and Bruno Tonioli returned as judges.

The show featured sixteen celebrities paired with sixteen professional dancers. The new professionals were Brian Fortuna and Hayley Holt, who had previously appeared in the American and New Zealand versions of the show respectively, and Russian dancer Kristina Rihanoff, who had taken part in the Dancing with the Stars tour. Nicole Cutler was the only professional from the previous series not to return.

On 20 December 2008, actor Tom Chambers and Camilla Sacre-Dallerup were announced as the winners, while S Club singer Rachel Stevens and Vincent Simone finished in second place, and model and television presenter Lisa Snowdon and Brendan Cole finished in third.

== Format ==
Hosts and Judges for Strictly Come Dancing (Series 6)

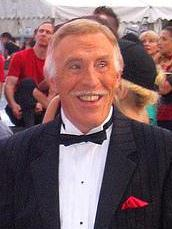
Bruce Forsyth

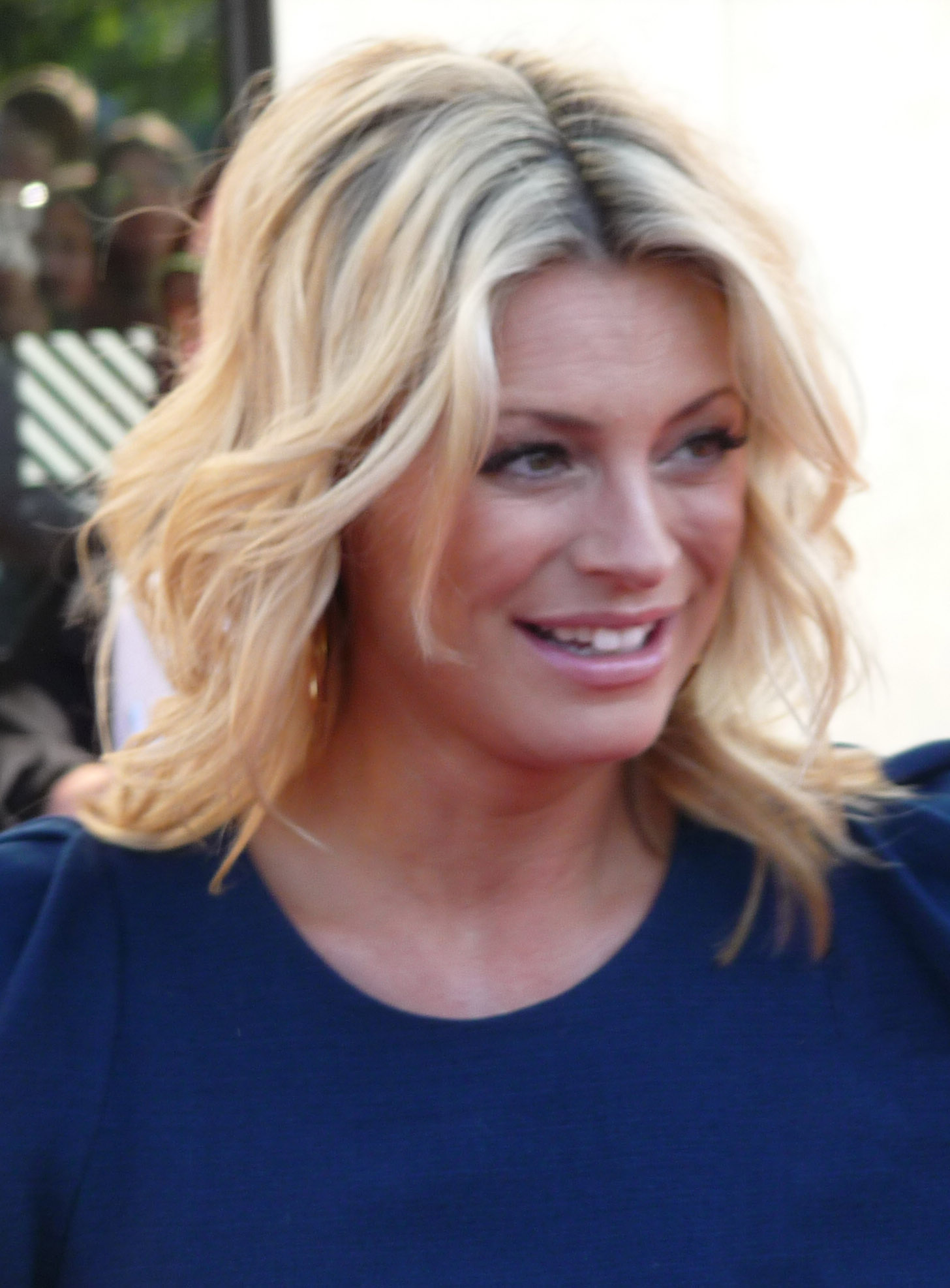
Tess Daly

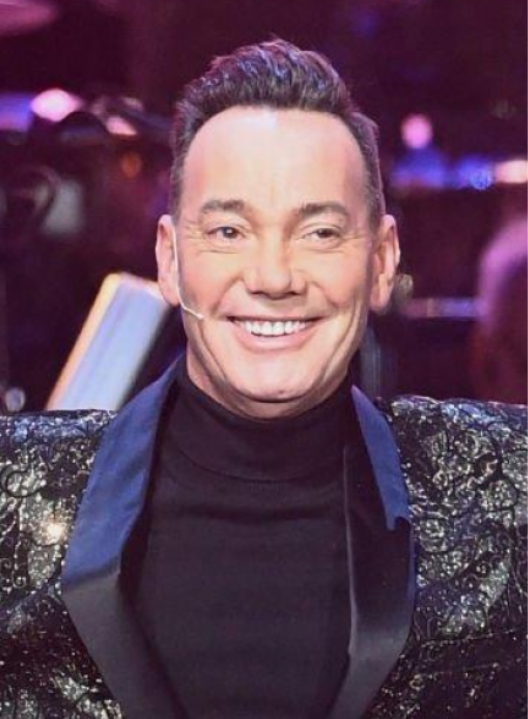
Craig Revel Horwood

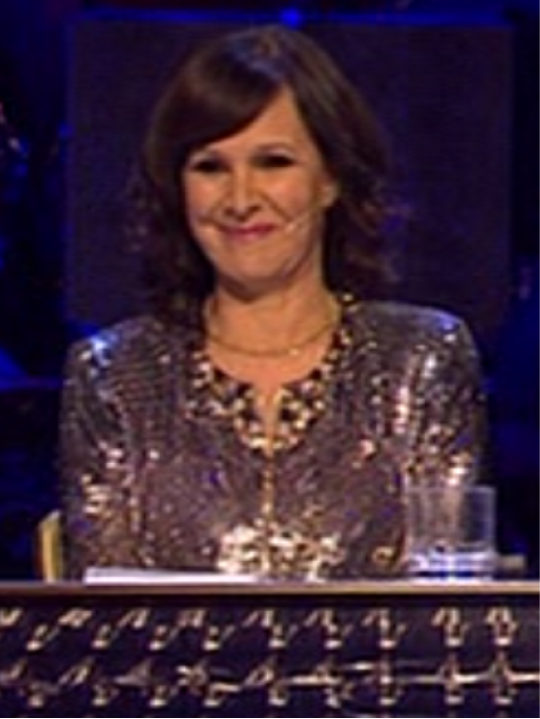
Arlene Phillips

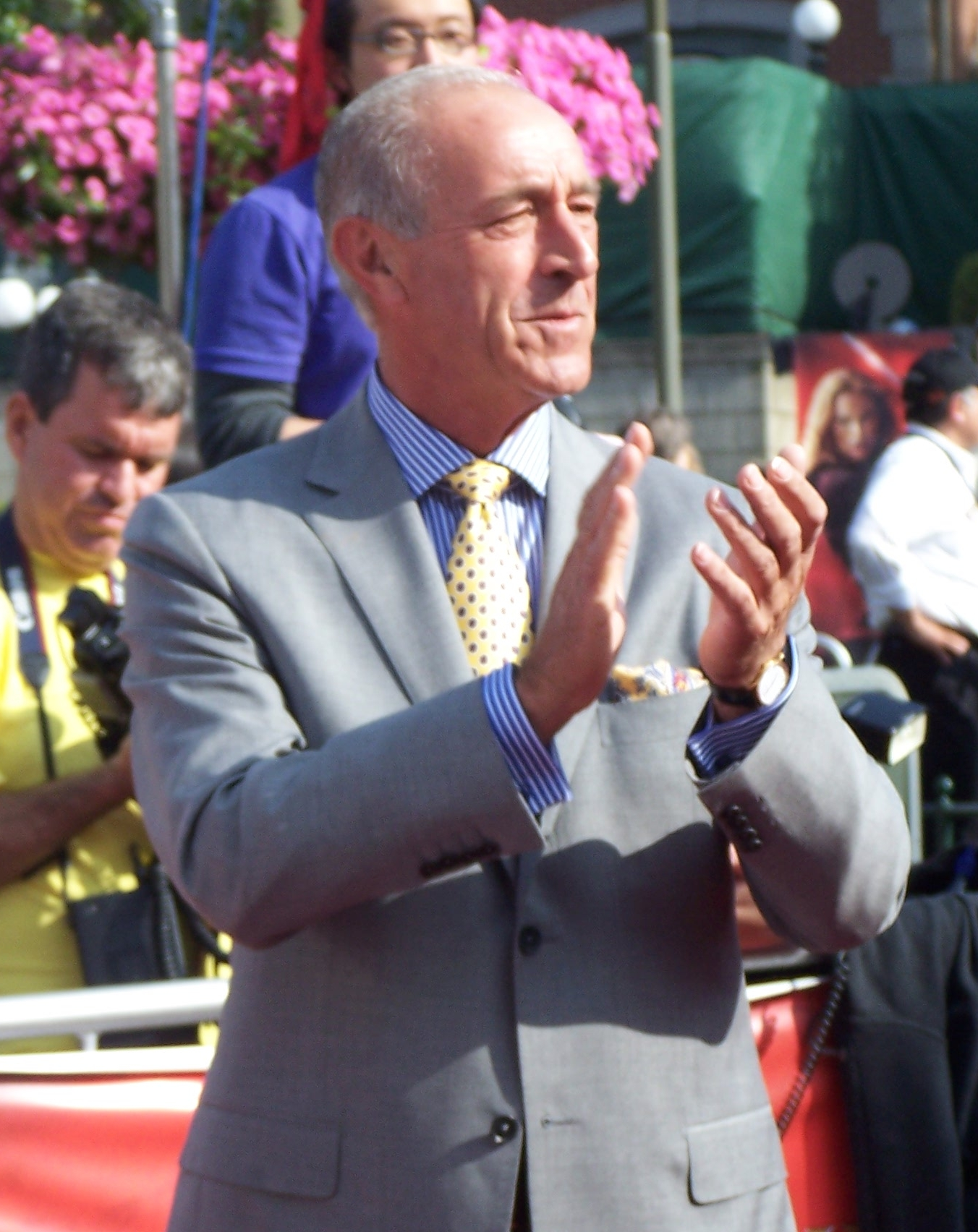
Len Goodman

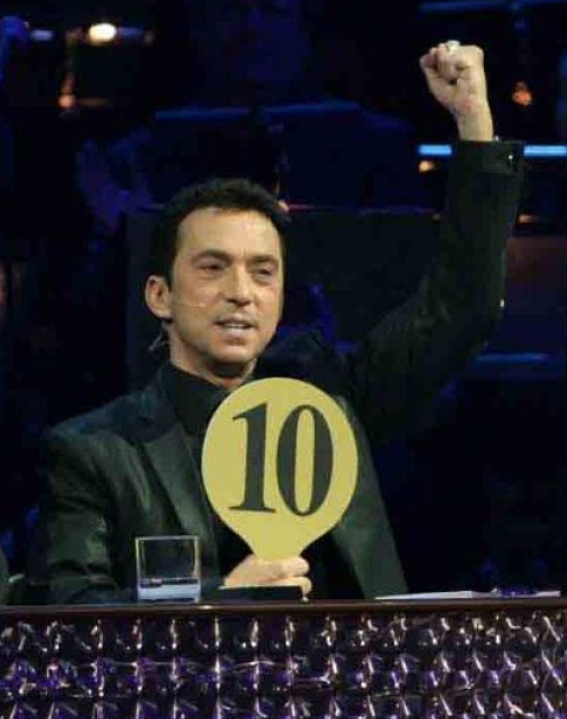
Bruno Tonioli

The couples dance each week in a live show. The judges score each performance out of ten. The couples are then ranked according to the judges' scores and given points according to their rank, with the lowest scored couple receiving one point, and the highest scored couple receiving the most points (the maximum number of points available depends on the number of couples remaining in the competition). The public are also invited to vote for their favourite couples, and the couples are ranked again according to the number of votes they receive, again receiving points; the couple with the fewest votes receiving one point, and the couple with the most votes receiving the most points.

The points for judges' score and public vote are then added together, and the two couples with the fewest points are placed in the bottom two. If two couples have equal points, the points from the public vote are given precedence. As with the previous series, the bottom two couples have to perform a dance-off on the results show. Based on that performance alone, each judge then votes on which couple should stay and which couple should leave, with Len Goodman, as head judge, having the last and deciding vote.

However, the situation was different on 13 December 2008, when it was announced on the live results show that all three couples would be going through to the finale, regardless of the judges' scores and the public vote. This was due to a tie at the top of the leaderboard, which made it mathematically impossible for Tom Chambers and Camilla Sacre-Dallerup to avoid the dance-off. Despite this, viewers were encouraged to vote. All phone votes cast were carried on to the finale.

== Couples ==
This series featured sixteen celebrity contestants.

Celebrity	Notability	Professional partner	Status
Phil Daniels	EastEnders actor	Flavia Cacace	Eliminated 1st on 21 September 2008
Gillian Taylforth	EastEnders actress	Anton Du Beke	Eliminated 2nd on 28 September 2008
Gary Rhodes	Chef & television presenter	Karen Hardy	Eliminated 3rd on 5 October 2008
Jessie Wallace	EastEnders actress	Darren Bennett	Eliminated 4th on 12 October 2008
Don Warrington	Film & television actor	Lilia Kopylova	Eliminated 5th on 19 October 2008
Mark Foster	Olympic swimmer	Hayley Holt	Eliminated 6th on 26 October 2008
Andrew Castle	GMTV presenter & tennis player	Ola Jordan	Eliminated 7th on 2 November 2008
Heather Small	M People singer	Brian Fortuna	Eliminated 8th on 9 November 2008
Cherie Lunghi	Stage & screen actress	James Jordan	Eliminated 9th on 16 November 2008
John Sergeant	Chief political correspondent	Kristina Rihanoff	Withdrew on 20 November 2008
Jodie Kidd	Fashion model	Ian Waite	Eliminated 10th on 23 November 2008
Christine Bleakley	The One Show presenter	Matthew Cutler	Eliminated 11th on 30 November 2008
Austin Healey	England rugby player	Erin Boag	Eliminated 12th on 7 December 2008
Lisa Snowdon	Model & television presenter	Brendan Cole	Third place on 20 December 2008
Rachel Stevens	S Club singer	Vincent Simone	Runners-up on 20 December 2008
Tom Chambers	Holby City actor	Camilla Sacre-Dallerup	Winners on 20 December 2008

== Scoring chart ==
The highest score each week is indicated in bold green with a dagger (†), while the lowest score each week is indicated in italicized red with a double-dagger (‡).

Color key:

Winners
Runners-up
Bottom two
Withdrew from competition
Eliminated

Strictly Come Dancing (series 6) - Weekly scores
Couple	Pl.	Week														
Couple	Pl.	1	2	3	4	5	6	7	8	9	10	11	12	13	14	13+14
Tom & Camilla	1st	28	—	33	—	**35**†	32	34	**36**†	35	36	35+35=70	39+34=73	33+34=67‡	35+38+37=110‡	177‡
Rachel & Vincent	2nd	—N/a	31	—N/a	33	30	32	32	35 (Note: This couple was in the bottom two, but was not eliminated.)	**39**†	**40**†	39+32=71	39+37=**76**†	39+36=**75**†	40+39+39=118	193
Lisa & Brendan	3rd	—N/a	22	—N/a	32	**35**†	29	35	**36**†	30	35	39+37=**76**†	39+33=72	35+40=**75**†	40+40+39=**119**†	**194**†
Austin & Erin	4th	**32**†	—N/a	**34**†	—N/a	32	**34**†	**36**†	29	38	35	36+38=74	34+36=70‡ (Note: This couple was eliminated.)			
Christine & Matthew	5th	—N/a	27	—N/a	26	30	22	29	31	34	27‡	28+30=58‡				
Jodie & Ian	6th	—N/a	25	—N/a	22	30	26	31	23	33	30					
John & Kristina	7th	22	—N/a	22	—N/a	16‡	21	20‡	12‡	25‡	(Note: This couple withdrew from the competition.)					
Cherie & James	8th	—N/a	**33**†	—N/a	**35**†	34	31	26	**36**†	32						
Heather & Brian	9th	—N/a	26	—N/a	23	23	27	23	27							
Andrew & Ola	10th	23	—N/a	22	—N/a	17	24	21								
Mark & Hayley	11th	22	—N/a	24	—N/a	17	16‡									
Don & Lilia	12th	19	—N/a	30	—N/a	25										
Jessie & Darren	13th	—N/a	20‡	—N/a	19‡											
Gary & Karen	14th	17‡	—N/a	18‡												
Gillian & Anton	15th	—N/a	22													
Phil & Flavia	16th	20														

=== Average chart ===
This table only counts for dances scored on a traditional 40-point scale.

Couple	Rank by average	Total points	Number of dances	Total average
Rachel & Vincent	1st	573	16	35.8
Lisa & Brendan	2nd	557	16	34.8
Tom & Camilla	3rd	552	16	34.5
Austin & Erin	3rd	414	12	34.5
Cherie & James	5th	227	7	32.4
Christine & Matthew	6th	284	10	28.4
Jodie & Ian	7th	220	8	27.5
Heather & Brian	8th	149	6	24.8
Don & Lilia	9th	74	3	24.7
Gillian & Anton	10th	22	1	22.0
Andrew & Ola	11th	107	5	21.4
Phil & Flavia	12th	20	1	20.0
Mark & Hayley	13th	79	4	19.8
John & Kristina	14th	138	7	19.7
Jessie & Darren	15th	39	2	19.5
Gary & Karen	16th	35	2	17.5

== Weekly scores ==
Unless indicated otherwise, individual judges scores in the charts below (given in parentheses) are listed in this order from left to right: Craig Revel Horwood, Arlene Phillips, Len Goodman, Bruno Tonioli.

=== Week 1 ===
Musical guest: Bette Midler — "Wind Beneath My Wings"

Only the male celebrities performed this week, and they performed either the cha-cha-cha or the waltz. The couples who did not compete this week performed a group cha-cha-cha that was not scored. Couples are listed in the order they performed.

Couple	Scores	Dance	Music	Result
Tom & Camilla	28 (6, 7, 8, 7)	Cha-cha-cha	"Nowhere to Run" — Martha and the Vandellas	Safe
Phil & Flavia	20 (4, 5, 6, 5)	Waltz	"I Have Nothing" — Whitney Houston	Eliminated
Don & Lilia	19 (3, 5, 6, 5)	Cha-cha-cha	"Let's Groove" — Earth, Wind & Fire	Bottom two
Austin & Erin	32 (7, 8, 9, 8)	Waltz	"The Rainbow Connection" — Sarah McLachlan	Safe
Mark & Hayley	22 (3, 6, 7, 6)	Waltz	"Tennessee Waltz" — Patti Page	Safe
Gary & Karen	17 (1, 5, 6, 5)	Cha-cha-cha	"Hippy Hippy Shake" — The Swinging Blue Jeans	Safe
John & Kristina	22 (5, 5, 6, 6)	Waltz	"Come Away with Me" — Norah Jones	Safe
Andrew & Ola	23 (4, 6, 7, 6)	Cha-cha-cha	"Mercy" — Duffy	Safe

Judges' votes to save

- Horwood: Phil & Flavia
- Phillips: Phil & Flavia
- Tonioli: Don & Lilia
- Goodman: Don & Lilia (Since the other judges were not unanimous, Len Goodman, as head judge, made the final decision to save Don & Lilia.)

=== Week 2 ===
Musical guest: Sugababes — "Girls"

Only the female celebrities performed this week, and they performed either the foxtrot or the salsa. The couples who did not compete this week performed a group merengue that was not scored. Couples are listed in the order they performed.

Couple	Scores	Dance	Music	Result
Jessie & Darren	20 (4, 4, 6, 6)	Salsa	"Hey Mambo" — Barry Manilow	Safe
Christine & Matthew	27 (6, 6, 8, 7)	Foxtrot	"The Way You Look Tonight" — Frank Sinatra	Safe
Lisa & Brendan	22 (5, 5, 6, 6)	Salsa	"Rhythm Is Gonna Get You" — Gloria Estefan	Safe
Jodie & Ian	25 (5, 6, 7, 7)	Foxtrot	"I've Got the World on a String" — Frank Sinatra	Bottom two
Heather & Brian	26 (5, 6, 8, 7)	Salsa	"La Banda" — Willie Colón	Safe
Gillian & Anton	22 (4, 5, 7, 6)	Foxtrot	"Razzle Dazzle" — Richard Gere	Eliminated
Rachel & Vincent	31 (7, 8, 8, 8)	Salsa	"Can't Buy Me Love" — The Beatles	Safe
Cherie & James	33 (8, 8, 9, 8)	Foxtrot	"Sweet About Me" — Gabriella Cilmi	Safe

Judges' votes to save

- Horwood: Jodie & Ian
- Phillips: Jodie & Ian
- Tonioli: Jodie & Ian
- Goodman: Did not vote, but would have voted to save Jodie & Ian

=== Week 3 ===
Musical guest: Andrea Bocelli — "Canto della Terra"

Only half of the couples performed this week, and they performed either the jive or the tango. The couples who did not compete this week performed a group swing dance that was not scored. Couples are listed in the order they performed.

Couple	Scores	Dance	Music	Result
Austin & Erin	34 (8, 8, 9, 9)	Jive	"You Can't Stop the Beat" — from Hairspray	Safe
Mark & Hayley	24 (5, 5, 7, 7)	Tango	"Tanguera" — Sexteto Mayor	Bottom two
Gary & Karen	18 (3, 4, 6, 5)	Jive	"Lipstick, Powder and Paint" — Shakin' Stevens	Eliminated
John & Kristina	22 (3, 6, 6, 7)	Tango	"Boulevard of Broken Dreams" — Tony Bennett	Safe
Andrew & Ola	22 (4, 6, 7, 5)	Tango	"20th Century Boy" — T. Rex	Safe
Tom & Camilla	33 (7, 8, 9, 9)	Jive	"Black and Gold" — Sam Sparro	Safe
Don & Lilia	30 (7, 7, 8, 8)	Tango	"Whatever Lola Wants" — Gotan Project	Safe

Judges' votes to save

- Horwood: Mark & Hayley
- Phillips: Mark & Hayley
- Tonioli: Mark & Hayley
- Goodman: Did not vote, but would have voted to save Mark & Hayley

=== Week 4 ===
Musical guest: Simply Red — "Something Got Me Started"

Only half of the couples performed this week, and they performed either the quickstep or the rumba. The couples who did not compete this week performed a group rueda that was not scored. Couples are listed in the order they performed.

Couple	Scores	Dance	Music	Result
Christine & Matthew	26 (6, 6, 7, 7)	Quickstep	"She's So Lovely" — Scouting for Girls	Safe
Jodie & Ian	22 (4, 6, 6, 6)	Rumba	"I Just Can't Stop Loving You" — Michael Jackson	Safe
Heather & Brian	23 (6, 5, 6, 6)	Quickstep	"Old Man Time" — Jimmy Durante	Bottom two
Cherie & James	35 (9, 9, 8, 9)	Rumba	"Songbird" — Eva Cassidy	Safe
Jessie & Darren	19 (3, 5, 5, 6)	Quickstep	"Help!" — The Beatles	Eliminated
Lisa & Brendan	32 (8, 8, 8, 8)	Rumba	"Suddenly" — Billy Ocean	Safe
Rachel & Vincent	33 (8, 8, 9, 8)	Quickstep	"Little Green Bag" — George Baker	Safe

Judges' votes to save

- Horwood: Heather & Brian
- Phillips: Heather & Brian
- Tonioli: Heather & Brian
- Goodman: Did not vote, but would have voted to save Jessie & Darren

=== Week 5 ===
Musical guests:

- Alesha Dixon — "The Boy Does Nothing"
- Katherine Jenkins & Darcey Bussell — "Viva Tonight"

Couples performed either the American Smooth or the samba, and are listed in the order they performed.

Couple	Scores	Dance	Music	Result
Rachel & Vincent	30 (7, 7, 8, 8)	Samba	"Hips Don't Lie" — Shakira	Safe
Lisa & Brendan	35 (8, 9, 9, 9)	American Smooth	"It Happened in Monterey" — Frank Sinatra	Safe
Heather & Brian	23 (4, 6, 6, 7)	Samba	"Lola, Lola" — Andy Fortuna	Bottom two
Cherie & James	34 (7, 9, 9, 9)	American Smooth	"Layla" — Eric Clapton	Safe
Mark & Hayley	17 (3, 4, 5, 5)	Samba	"Spice Up Your Life" — Spice Girls	Safe
Don & Lilia	25 (6, 6, 7, 6)	American Smooth	"Can't Smile Without You" — Barry Manilow	Eliminated
Austin & Erin	32 (8, 8, 8, 8)	Samba	"Move Your Feet" — Junior Senior	Safe
Andrew & Ola	17 (3, 4, 5, 5)	American Smooth	"You Know I'm No Good" — Amy Winehouse	Safe
Christine & Matthew	30 (7, 7, 8, 8)	Samba	"Baila, Baila Conmigo" — Rubén Gómez	Safe
Jodie & Ian	30 (7, 7, 8, 8)	American Smooth	"Witchcraft" — Frank Sinatra	Safe
John & Kristina	16 (2, 4, 5, 5)	Samba	"Papa Loves Mambo" — Perry Como	Safe
Tom & Camilla	35 (8, 9, 9, 9)	American Smooth	"Chicago (That Toddlin' Town)" — Frank Sinatra	Safe

Judges' votes to save

- Horwood: Heather & Brian
- Phillips: Heather & Brian
- Tonioli: Heather & Brian
- Goodman: Did not vote, but would have voted to save Don & Lilia

=== Week 6 ===
Musical guest: Enrique Iglesias — "Hero"

Couples performed either the paso doble or the Viennese waltz, and are listed in the order they performed.

Couple	Scores	Dance	Music	Result
Lisa & Brendan	29 (7, 7, 8, 7)	Paso doble	"Eye of the Tiger" — Survivor	Safe
Andrew & Ola	24 (5, 6, 7, 6)	Viennese waltz	"Annie's Song" — John Denver	Bottom two
Christine & Matthew	22 (3, 6, 7, 6)	Paso doble	"Fighter" — Christina Aguilera	Safe
Austin & Erin	34 (8, 8, 9, 9)	Viennese waltz	"Send in the Clowns" — Stephen Sondheim & Glynis Johns	Safe
Cherie & James	31 (7, 8, 8, 8)	Paso doble	"Amparito Roca" — Jaime Teixidor	Safe
Heather & Brian	27 (5, 7, 7, 8)	Viennese waltz	"Vision of Love" — Mariah Carey	Safe
Mark & Hayley	16 (2, 3, 6, 5)	Paso doble	"Since U Been Gone" — Kelly Clarkson	Eliminated
Tom & Camilla	32 (7, 9, 7, 9)	Viennese waltz	"Can't Help Falling in Love" — Elvis Presley	Safe
John & Kristina	21 (3, 6, 6, 6)	Paso doble	"Concierto de Aranjuez" — Joaquin Rodrigo	Safe
Rachel & Vincent	32 (8, 8, 8, 8)	Viennese waltz	"Everybody Hurts" — R.E.M.	Safe
Jodie & Ian	26 (6, 6, 7, 7)	Paso doble	"Song 2" — Blur	Safe

Judges' votes to save

- Horwood: Andrew & Ola
- Phillips: Andrew & Ola
- Tonioli: Andrew & Ola
- Goodman: Did not vote, but would have voted to save Andrew & Ola

=== Week 7 ===
Musical guest: Stereophonics — "Handbags and Gladrags"

Couples are listed in the order they performed.

Couple	Scores	Dance	Music	Result
Austin & Erin	36 (8, 9, 10, 9)	Quickstep	"S'Wonderful" — George Gershwin	Safe
Heather & Brian	23 (5, 5, 7, 6)	Cha-cha-cha	"American Boy" — Estelle	Bottom two
Jodie & Ian	31 (7, 8, 8, 8)	Waltz	"Sandy's Song" — Dolly Parton	Safe
Andrew & Ola	21 (4, 5, 7, 5)	Samba	"Ain't It Funny" — Jennifer Lopez	Eliminated
Lisa & Brendan	35 (8, 9, 9, 9)	Tango	"La Cumparsita" — Gerardo Matos Rodríguez	Safe
Cherie & James	26 (6, 6, 7, 7)	Salsa	"Oye Mi Canto (Hear My Voice)" — Gloria Estefan	Safe
John & Kristina	20 (3, 5, 6, 6)	Foxtrot	"I Wanna Be Loved by You" — Marilyn Monroe	Safe
Tom & Camilla	34 (8, 9, 8, 9)	Paso doble	"(I Just) Died in Your Arms" — Cutting Crew	Safe
Christine & Matthew	29 (7, 7, 8, 7)	American Smooth	"Singin' in the Rain" — from Singin' in the Rain	Safe
Rachel & Vincent	32 (7, 8, 8, 9)	Jive	"Sweet Soul Music" — Arthur Conley	Safe

Judges' votes to save

- Horwood: Heather & Brian
- Phillips: Heather & Brian
- Tonioli: Heather & Brian
- Goodman: Did not vote, but would have voted to save Heather & Brian

=== Week 8 ===
Musical guest: Beyonce — "If I Were a Boy"

Couples are listed in the order they performed.

Couple	Scores	Dance	Music	Result
Tom & Camilla	36 (9, 9, 9, 9)	Quickstep	"Town Called Malice" — The Jam	Safe
Jodie & Ian	23 (3, 6, 7, 7)	Samba	"Help Yourself" — Tom Jones	Safe
Heather & Brian	27 (6, 7, 7, 7)	Tango	"Rebel Rebel" — David Bowie	Eliminated
Austin & Erin	29 (5, 8, 8, 8)	Rumba	"When You Tell Me That You Love Me" — Diana Ross	Safe
Cherie & James	36 (9, 9, 9, 9)	Waltz	"I Wonder Why" — Curtis Stigers	Safe
Christine & Matthew	31 (7, 8, 8, 8)	Jive	"Jailhouse Rock" — Elvis Presley	Safe
Rachel & Vincent	35 (8, 9, 9, 9)	American Smooth	"I Got a Woman" — Ray Charles	Bottom two
John & Kristina	12 (1, 3, 4, 4)	Cha-cha-cha	"Twist and Shout" — The Beatles	Safe
Lisa & Brendan	36 (9, 9, 9, 9)	Viennese waltz	"Bed of Roses" — Bon Jovi	Safe

Judges' votes to save

- Horwood: Rachel & Vincent
- Phillips: Rachel & Vincent
- Tonioli: Rachel & Vincent
- Goodman: Did not vote, but would have voted to save Rachel & Vincent

=== Week 9 ===
Couples are listed in the order they performed.

Couple	Scores	Dance	Music	Result
Jodie & Ian	33 (7, 8, 9, 9)	Quickstep	"Mr. Pinstripe Suit" — Big Bad Voodoo Daddy	Safe
Lisa & Brendan	30 (6, 7, 9, 8)	Samba	"Rock the Boat" — The Hues Corporation	Bottom two
Christine & Matthew	34 (8, 8, 9, 9)	Waltz	"See the Day" — Girls Aloud	Safe
Cherie & James	32 (7, 8, 8, 9)	Cha-cha-cha	"Play That Funky Music" — Wild Cherry	Eliminated
Austin & Erin	38 (9, 9, 10, 10)	Tango	"Libertango" — Astor Piazzolla	Safe
Rachel & Vincent	39 (9, 10, 10, 10)	Rumba	"You Do Something To Me" — Paul Weller	Safe
John & Kristina	25 (5, 6, 7, 7)	American Smooth	"True Love Ways" — Buddy Holly	Safe
Tom & Camilla	35 (8, 9, 9, 9)	Salsa	"Pa Gonza Con Fruko" — Fruko y sus Tesos	Safe

Judges' votes to save

- Horwood: Lisa & Brendan
- Phillips: Lisa & Brendan
- Tonioli: Cherie & James
- Goodman: Lisa & Brendan

=== Week 10 ===
John Sergeant withdrew from the competition earlier in the week, but he and Kristina Rihanoff still performed their waltz, although it was not scored.

Couples are listed in the order they performed.

Couple	Scores	Dance	Music	Result
Lisa & Brendan	35 (8, 9, 9, 9)	Quickstep	"Yes" — Merry Clayton	Bottom two
Christine & Matthew	27 (6, 6, 8, 7)	Cha-cha-cha	"I Like It Like That" — Pete Rodriguez	Safe
Jodie & Ian	30 (7, 7, 8, 8)	Jive	"Great Balls of Fire" — Jerry Lee Lewis	Eliminated
Tom & Camilla	36 (9, 9, 9, 9)	Tango	"Please Mr. Brown" — Alma Cogan	Safe
Rachel & Vincent	40 (10, 10, 10, 10)	Foxtrot	"(They Long to Be) Close to You" — Matt Monro	Safe
Austin & Erin	35 (8, 9, 9, 9)	Cha-cha-cha	"It's Raining Men" — The Weather Girls	Safe
John & Kristina	No scores received	Waltz	"Come Away with Me" — Norah Jones	Withdrew

Judges' votes to save

- Horwood: Lisa & Brendan
- Phillips: Lisa & Brendan
- Tonioli: Lisa & Brendan
- Goodman: Did not vote, but would have voted to save Lisa & Brendan

=== Week 11 ===
Musical guest: Estelle — "American Boy"

Each couple performed two routines. Couples are listed in the order they performed.

Couple	Scores	Dance	Music	Result
Rachel & Vincent	39 (9, 10, 10, 10)	Waltz	"Angel" — Sarah McLachlan	Bottom two
Rachel & Vincent	32 (7, 8, 8, 9)	Paso doble	"The Final Countdown" — Europe	Bottom two
Lisa & Brendan	39 (9, 10, 10, 10)	Foxtrot	"Walkin' My Baby Back Home" — Nat King Cole	Safe
Lisa & Brendan	37 (9, 9, 9, 10)	Cha-cha-cha	"Tears Dry on Their Own" — Amy Winehouse	Safe
Christine & Matthew	28 (6, 7, 8, 7)	Tango	"Addicted to Love" — Robert Palmer	Eliminated
Christine & Matthew	30 (7, 7, 8, 8)	Salsa	"Cosmic Girl" — Jamiroquai	Eliminated
Austin & Erin	36 (8, 9, 9, 10)	Foxtrot	"L-O-V-E" — Nat King Cole	Safe
Austin & Erin	38 (10, 10, 8, 10)	Paso doble	"España cañí" — Pascual Marquina Narro	Safe
Tom & Camilla	35 (7, 9, 10, 9)	Waltz	"Moon River" — Audrey Hepburn	Safe
Tom & Camilla	35 (8, 9, 9, 9)	Samba	"Mr. Melody" — Natalie Cole	Safe

Judges' votes to save

- Horwood: Rachel & Vincent
- Phillips: Rachel & Vincent
- Tonioli: Rachel & Vincent
- Goodman: Did not vote, but would have voted to save Rachel & Vincent

=== Week 12: Quarterfinal ===
Musical guest: Barry Manilow — "Copacabana"

Each couple performed two routines. Couples are listed in the order they performed.

Couple	Scores	Dance	Music	Result
Austin & Erin	34 (8, 8, 9, 9)	American Smooth	"The Best Is Yet to Come" — Frank Sinatra	Eliminated
Austin & Erin	36 (8, 9, 10, 9)	Salsa	"Johnny's Mambo" — from Dirty Dancing	Eliminated
Lisa & Brendan	39 (9, 10, 10, 10)	Waltz	"He Was Beautiful" — Shirley Bassey	Bottom two
Lisa & Brendan	33 (8, 8, 8, 9)	Jive	"Crocodile Rock" — Elton John	Bottom two
Tom & Camilla	39 (9, 10, 10, 10)	Foxtrot	"Here You Come Again" — Dolly Parton	Safe
Tom & Camilla	34 (9, 9, 8, 8)	Rumba	"You Needed Me" — Boyzone	Safe
Rachel & Vincent	39 (9, 10, 10, 10)	Tango	"Here Comes the Rain Again" — Eurythmics	Safe
Rachel & Vincent	37 (9, 9, 9, 10)	Cha-cha-cha	"Signed, Sealed, Delivered I'm Yours" — Stevie Wonder	Safe

Judges' votes to save

- Horwood: Lisa & Brendan
- Phillips: Lisa & Brendan
- Tonioli: Lisa & Brendan
- Goodman: Did not vote, but would have voted to save Lisa & Brendan

=== Week 13: Semifinal ===
Musical guests: Cast of Chicago — "All That Jazz"

Each couple performed two routines, one of which was the Argentine tango. There was no elimination at the end of the night due to an issue with the scoring system discovered after the show. Couples are listed in the order they performed.

Couple	Scores	Dance	Music
Lisa & Brendan	35 (8, 8, 10, 9)	Argentine tango	"Infiltrado" — Bajofondo
Lisa & Brendan	40 (10, 10, 10, 10)	Quickstep	"Dancing in the Dark" — Frank Sinatra
Tom & Camilla	33 (8, 8, 9, 8)	Jive	"Waterloo" — ABBA
Tom & Camilla	34 (8, 8, 9, 9)	Argentine tango	"Por una Cabeza" — Carlos Gardel
Rachel & Vincent	39 (9, 10, 10, 10)	Argentine tango	"When Doves Cry" — Prince
Rachel & Vincent	36 (9, 9, 8, 10)	American Smooth	"Mandy" — Barry Manilow

=== Week 14: Final ===
Musical guest: Duffy — "Mercy"

Each couple performed their favourite ballroom dance, their favourite Latin dance, and their showdance routine. Couples are listed in the order they performed.

Couple	Scores	Dance	Music	Result
Rachel & Vincent	40 (10, 10, 10, 10)	Foxtrot	"(They Long to Be) Close to You" — Matt Monro	Runners-up
Rachel & Vincent	39 (9, 10, 10, 10)	Rumba	"You Do Something To Me" — Paul Weller	Runners-up
Rachel & Vincent		Showdance	"Flashdance... What a Feeling" — Irene Cara	Runners-up
Tom & Camilla	35 (8, 9, 9, 9)	Foxtrot	"Here You Come Again" — Dolly Parton	Winners
Tom & Camilla	38 (9, 10, 10, 9)	Salsa	"Pa Gonza Con Fruko" — Fruko y sus Tesos	Winners
Tom & Camilla		Showdance	"If My Friends Could See Me Now" — from Sweet Charity	Winners
Lisa & Brendan	40 (10, 10, 10, 10)	Foxtrot	"Walkin' My Baby Back Home" — Nat King Cole	Runners-up
Lisa & Brendan	40 (10, 10, 10, 10)	Cha-cha-cha	"Tears Dry on Their Own" — Amy Winehouse	Runners-up
Lisa & Brendan		Showdance	"I'd Do Anything for Love (But I Won't Do That)" — Meat Loaf	Runners-up

== Dance chart ==
The couples performed the following each week:

- Week 1: One unlearned dance (cha-cha-cha or waltz); group cha-cha-cha
- Week 2: One unlearned dance (foxtrot or salsa); group merengue
- Week 3: One unlearned dance (jive or tango); group swing dance
- Week 4: One unlearned dance (quickstep or rumba); group rueda
- Week 5: One unlearned dance (American Smooth or samba)
- Week 6: One unlearned dance (paso doble or Viennese waltz)
- Weeks 7–10: One unlearned dance
- Weeks 11–12: Two unlearned dances
- Week 13 (Semifinal): Argentine tango & one re-choreographed routine
- Week 14 (Final): Favourite ballroom dance, favourite Latin dance & showdance

Strictly Come Dancing (series 6) - Dance chart
Couple	Week																		
Couple	1	2	3	4	5	6	7	8	9	10	11		12		13		14		
Tom & Camilla	Cha-cha-cha	Group; Merengue	Jive	Group Rueda	American Smooth	Viennese waltz	Paso doble	Quickstep	Salsa	Tango	Waltz	Samba	Foxtrot	Rumba	Jive	Argentine tango	Foxtrot	Salsa	Showdance
Rachel & Vincent	Group; Cha-cha-cha	Salsa	Group Swing	Quickstep	Samba	Viennese waltz	Jive	American Smooth	Rumba	Foxtrot	Waltz	Paso doble	Tango	Cha-cha-cha	Argentine tango	American Smooth	Foxtrot	Rumba	Showdance
Lisa & Brendan	Group Cha-cha-cha	Salsa	Group Swing	Rumba	American Smooth	Paso doble	Tango	Viennese waltz	Samba	Quickstep	Foxtrot	Cha-cha-cha	Waltz	Jive	Argentine tango	Quickstep	Foxtrot	Cha-cha-cha	Showdance
Austin & Erin	Waltz	Group Merengue	Jive	Group Rueda	Samba	Viennese waltz	Quickstep	Rumba	Tango	Cha-cha-cha	Foxtrot	Paso doble	American Smooth	Salsa					
Christine & Matthew	Group Cha-cha-cha	Foxtrot	Group Swing	Quickstep	Samba	Paso doble	American Smooth	Jive	Waltz	Cha-cha-cha	Tango	Salsa							
Jodie & Ian	Group Cha-cha-cha	Foxtrot	Group Swing	Rumba	American Smooth	Paso doble	Waltz	Samba	Quickstep	Jive									
John & Kristina	Waltz	Group Merengue	Tango	Group Rueda	Samba	Paso doble	Foxtrot	Cha-cha-cha	American Smooth	Waltz (Note: No scores were received for this dance.)									
Cherie & James	Group Cha-cha-cha	Foxtrot	Group Swing	Rumba	American Smooth	Paso doble	Salsa	Waltz	Cha-cha-cha										
Heather & Brian	Group Cha-cha-cha	Salsa	Group Swing	Quickstep	Samba	Viennese waltz	Cha-cha-cha	Tango											
Andrew & Ola	Cha-cha-cha	Group Merengue	Tango	Group Rueda	American Smooth	Viennese waltz	Samba												
Mark & Hayley	Waltz	Group Merengue	Tango	Group Rueda	Samba	Paso doble													
Don & Lilia	Cha-cha-cha	Group Merengue	Tango	Group Rueda	American Smooth														
Jessie & Darren	Group Cha-cha-cha	Salsa	Group Swing	Quickstep															
Gary & Karen	Cha-cha-cha	Group Merengue	Jive																
Gillian & Anton	Group Cha-cha-cha	Foxtrot																	
Phil & Flavia	Waltz																		

== Ratings ==
Weekly ratings for each show on BBC One. All ratings are provided by BARB.

Episode	Date	Official rating (millions)	Weekly rank for BBC One	Weekly rank for all UK TV
Launch show	13 September	6.22	6	14
Week 1	20 September	8.48	3	7
Week 1 results	21 September	8.61	1	5
Week 2	27 September	9.02	2	5
Week 2 results	28 September	8.44	3	8
Week 3	4 October	9.66	1	5
Week 3 results	5 October	8.60	3	9
Week 4	11 October	7.79	4	12
Week 4 results	12 October	7.68	5	13
Week 5	18 October	8.99	3	10
Week 5 results	19 October	9.32	2	8
Week 6	25 October	9.75	2	5
Week 6 results	26 October	9.95	1	4
Week 7	1 November	9.79	1	5
Week 7 results	2 November	8.79	5	13
Week 8	8 November	10.04	1	4
Week 8 results	9 November	8.98	4	11
Week 9	15 November	10.03	3	5
Week 9 results	16 November	9.76	5	8
Week 10	22 November	10.75	1	2
Week 10 results	23 November	10.51	2	3
Week 11	29 November	10.51	1	3
Week 11 results	30 November	9.95	2	7
Week 12	6 December	9.75	1	6
Week 12 results	7 December	9.68	2	7
Week 13	13 December	10.37	1	4
Week 13 results	14 December	9.58	4	8
Week 14	20 December	12.97	1	1
Week 14 results	20 December	12.03	2	2
Series average (excl. launch show)	2008	9.64	—N/a	—N/a
