= James Jordan (dancer) =

English ballroom dancer and choreographer (born 1978)

- Born: 13 April 1978 (age 48); Gillingham, Kent, England
- Occupations: Dancer, choreographer
- Years active: 2006–present
- Television: Strictly Come Dancing (2006–13); Celebrity Big Brother (2014, 2017); Dancing On Ice (2019)
- Spouse: Ola Grabowska (m. 2003; sep. 2026)
- Children: 1

James Jordan (born 13 April 1978) is an English ballroom dancer and choreographer. His dance partner was his wife Ola Jordan, with whom he turned professional in 2000 and was married to between 2003 and 2026. Jordan appeared as a professional on Strictly Come Dancing from 2006 to 2013. In August 2014, he participated in the fourteenth series of Celebrity Big Brother. He finished in third place. He returned as an All-Star for the nineteenth series in 2017, where he was evicted in thirteenth place.

In 2018 he appeared along with his wife, Ola, on Comedy Central's Your Face or Mine?. In 2019, Jordan won the eleventh series of Dancing on Ice, where he was partnered with professional Finnish figure skater Alexandra Schauman.

== Early life and dancing career ==
Jordan was born on 13 April 1978 in Gillingham, Kent, and attended St John Fisher Catholic School in Chatham. He started dancing at the age of 13. He now dances with his wife, Ola. Ola previously danced with Przemek Lowicki in Poland; James previously danced with Agnieszka Melnicka, but they split in 1999. He also danced with Kate Pothecary (1996) and Elisabeth Haraldsdottir (October 1997 – December 1997).

James and Ola's first recorded dance as a partnership was in the Dutch Open in 2000, though they did not turn professional until 2003. The couple retired for a while, in favour of teaching Latin American dancing in Hong Kong, though they returned to competition later.

In May 2006, the couple came second in the Blackpool Professional Rising Stars Latin event, and in November they came third in the British Championship, Professional Latin. In 2010, he was a choreographer in So You Think You Can Dance. As of 2014 they live near Maidstone in Kent, close to his family who live on St Mary's Island, Medway.

== Strictly Come Dancing ==
=== Highest and lowest scoring performances per dance ===
Dance	Partner	Highest	Partner	Lowest
American Smooth	Denise Van Outen; Pamela Stephenson	37	Zöe Lucker	33
Cha Cha Cha	Cherie Lunghi; Pamela Stephenson	32	Vanessa Feltz	19
Charleston	Denise Van Outen	40	Alex Jones	29
Foxtrot	Cherie Lunghi; Zöe Lucker; Pamela Stephenson	33	Georgina Bouzova	26
Jive	Denise Van Outen	39	Georgina Bouzova	18
Paso Doble	Denise Van Outen	36	Alex Jones; Cherie Lunghi; Zöe Lucker	31
Quickstep	Pamela Stephenson	40	Gabby Logan	29
Rumba	Denise Van Outen	38	Georgina Bouzova	14
Salsa	Denise Van Outen; Pamela Stephenson	32	Cherie Lunghi	26
Samba	Zöe Lucker	32	Gabby Logan	30
Showdance	Denise Van Outen	40	Pamela Stephenson	37
Tango	Denise Van Outen	39	Vanessa Feltz	20
Viennese Waltz	Pamela Stephenson	40	Alex Jones	32
Waltz	Cherie Lunghi	36	Vanessa Feltz	23

Series	Partner	Place	Average Score
4	Georgina Bouzova	10th	19.3
5	Gabby Logan	11th	30.0
6	Cherie Lunghi	8th	32.4
7	Zöe Lucker	10th	31.4
8	Pamela Stephenson	3rd	35.1
9	Alex Jones	5th	30.3
10	Denise van Outen	2nd	35.1
11	Vanessa Feltz	14th	20.7

=== Series 4 (2006) ===
In his first series as a Strictly professional, Jordan partnered Casualty actress Georgina Bouzova.

Week #	Dance/Song	Judges' scores					Result
Week #	Dance/Song	Craig Revel Horwood	Len Goodman	Arlene Phillips	Bruno Tonioli	Total	Result
2	Rumba / Let's Get It On	3	5	2	4	14	Bottom two
3	Jive / Burning Love	3	6	3	6	18	Bottom two
4	Foxtrot / Have You Met Miss Jones?	5	8	6	7	26	Eliminated

- Series average for Georgina and James: 19.3

=== Series 5 (2007) ===
In the fifth series of Strictly, Jordan was partnered by BBC Sport presenter Gabby Logan, whose rugby union player husband Kenny Logan was partnered by Ola Jordan. This was the first time two married couples had competed against each other. Gabby and James were voted out in Week 4 of the competition, as he did in the previous series while Kenny and Ola were voted out in Week 9 (ending up in 5th place).

Week #	Dance/Song	Judges' scores					Result
Week #	Dance/Song	Craig Revel Horwood	Len Goodman	Arlene Phillips	Bruno Tonioli	Total	Result
2	Quickstep / Things	8	7	7	7	29	Safe
3	Jive / Saturday Night's Alright	8	8	7	8	31	Safe
4	Samba / Eso Beso (That Kiss)	7	8	7	8	30	Eliminated

- Series average for Gabby and James: 30.0

=== Series 6 (2008) ===
In the sixth series of Strictly Come Dancing, James Jordan danced with actress Cherie Lunghi, while Ola's partner was the GMTV presenter Andrew Castle. After having exited so early in his previous series, James was concerned he was under a "four-week curse", which was then broken. He and Lunghi were voted off in Week 9, in a dance-off against Lisa Snowdon and her partner Brendan Cole. In January–February 2009, Jordan also danced with Lunghi on the Strictly Come Dancing Tour 2009.

Week #	Dance/Song	Judges' scores					Result
Week #	Dance/Song	Craig Revel Horwood	Len Goodman	Arlene Phillips	Bruno Tonioli	Total	Result
2	Foxtrot / Sweet About Me	8	9	8	8	33	Safe
4	Rumba / Songbird	9	8	9	9	35	Safe
5	American Smooth / Layla	7	9	9	9	34	Safe
6	Paso Doble / Amparito Roca	7	8	8	8	31	Safe
7	Salsa / Oye Mi Canto (Hear My Voice)	6	7	6	7	26	Safe
8	Waltz / I Wonder Why	9	9	9	9	36	Safe
9	Cha Cha Cha / Play That Funky Music	7	8	8	9	32	Eliminated

- Series average for Cherie and James: 32.4

=== Series 7 (2009) ===
In series 7, he was partnered by actress Zöe Lucker but they were eliminated in week 7. Jordan stated that "winning that trophy is my dream but I wouldn't give up this wonderful lady for that ball." Eventually, wife Ola won the competition that year, partnered with presenter Chris Hollins.

Week #	Dance/Song	Judges' score					Result
Week #	Dance/Song	Craig Revel Horwood	Len Goodman	Alesha Dixon	Bruno Tonioli	Total	Result
2	Waltz / Some Day My Prince Will Come; Rumba / Out of Reach	7; 8	8; 7	7; 8	8; 8	30; 31	Safe
3	Paso Doble / You Got the Love	7	8	8	8	31	Safe
4	Foxtrot / This Will Be (An Everlasting Love)	8	9	8	8	33	Safe
5	Jive / Tainted Love	7	8	8	7	30	Bottom two
6	American Smooth / My Girl	8	8	9	8	33	Safe
7	Samba / Boogie Nights	7	8	9	8	32	Eliminated

- Series average for Zöe and James: 31.4

=== Series 8 (2010) ===
In the 2010 series, Jordan was partnered with comedian and psychologist Pamela Stephenson. Despite competing at the age of 61, Pamela quickly defied all odds by topping the judges' leaderboard for the first three weeks of the competition, and for six weeks in total, a record for the series. In week 10, their Viennese Waltz received the first ever perfect 40 from the judges for the series. The pair made it to the Strictly final, and despite never being in the bottom two even once before and were the highest-scoring couple throughout the evening, they eventually finished in third place behind actress Kara Tointon and presenter and former gymnast Matt Baker. Pamela and James collected three perfect scores from the judges throughout the series, a record at the time they shared with Lisa Snowdon and Brendan Cole in series 6.

- Series average: 35.1
- Bold scores indicate the occasion where their dances were the highest-scoring dances of the respective weeks.

Week #	Dance/Song	Judges' scores					Result
Week #	Dance/Song	Craig Revel Horwood	Len Goodman	Alesha Dixon	Bruno Tonioli	Total	Result
1	Waltz / If I Ain't Got You	7	8	8	8	31	Safe
2	Salsa / Dr. Beat	8	8	8	8	32	Safe
3	Rumba / Make You Feel My Love	9	8	9	9	35	Safe
4	Tango / Love is the Drug	8	8	9	9	34	Safe
5	Jive / Devil Gate Drive	6	7	7	7	27	Safe
6	Foxtrot / Let There Be Love	8	9	8	8	33	Safe
7	Cha Cha Cha / Money (That's What I Want)	8	8	8	8	32	Safe
8	American Smooth / Perhaps, Perhaps, Perhaps	8	9	10	10	37	Safe
9	Charleston / Let's Misbehave	9	9	10	10	38	Safe
10	Viennese Waltz / Unchained Melody	10	10	10	10	40	Safe
11	Paso Doble / Bad Romance; Swing-a-thon / In the Mood; Quickstep / Steppin' Out with My Baby	8 Awarded; 10	9; 3; 10	9 Extra; 10	9 Points; 10	35; 38; 40	Safe
12	Viennese Waltz / Unchained Melody; Showdance / The Time of My Life	10; 9	10; 9	10; 9	10; 10	40; 37	Third Place

=== Series 9 (2011) ===
The One Show presenter Alex Jones was James Jordan's partner in the 2011 series. Jordan and judge Craig Revel Horwood were involved in a minor feud, as a 6 for Jones' Charleston in week 9 caused the couple to flutter down the leaderboard, as opposed to their top position the week before. The tough score outraged the professional dancer as he reportedly stormed out of the studio fuming, feeling the score to be undeserved and personal against James. Horwood further defended his judgement by claiming himself to be "tougher" as the competition goes. This feud was further reiterated when Horwood dropped James and Ola Jordan from the Strictly tour later in the year. Jordan and Jones reached the semi-final, eventually coming fifth in the competition.

Week #	Dance/Song	Judges' score					Result
Week #	Dance/Song	Craig Revel Horwood	Len Goodman	Alesha Dixon	Bruno Tonioli	Total	Result
1	Cha Cha Cha / When Love Takes Over	4	6	6	6	22	Safe
2	Foxtrot / Have You Met Miss Jones?	6	8	7	8	29	Safe
3	Viennese Waltz / Memory	8	8	8	8	32	Safe
4	Rumba / Run	4	7	7	7	25	Safe
5	Paso Doble / Bring Me to Life	7	8	8	8	31	Safe
6	Quickstep / It Don't Mean a Thing (If It Ain't Got That Swing)	7	8	8	8	31	Safe
7	Jive / River Deep, Mountain High	7	8	8	8	31	Safe
8	Tango / Relax	8	9	9	9	35	Safe
9	Charleston / Me and My Baby; Swing-a-thon	6 Awarded	7; 5	8 Extra	8 Points	29 34	Safe
10	American Smooth / Pretty Woman	8	8	9	9	34	Safe
11	Waltz / (You Make Me Feel Like) A Natural Woman; Salsa / 1234	7; 7	9; 8	9; 8	9; 8	34; 31	Eliminated

Jennifer Grey, the winner of the eleventh series of Dancing with the Stars, the American version of 'Strictly', was a guest judge, replacing Len Goodman while he had a week off.

- Series average for Alex and James: 30.3

=== Series 10 (2012) ===
For its tenth series in September 2012, Jordan was partners with television presenter, actress and singer Denise van Outen. Surpassing his feat with Pamela Stephenson, he secured the top position of the leaderboard 7 times with Denise, including 4 consecutive top positions. For the second time ever, he reached the final but placed his best in the competition overall, with Outen and Jordan finishing as runners-up with singer Kimberley Walsh and her partner Pasha Kovalev, behind the winners gymnast Louis Smith and professional partner Flavia Cacace.

Week #	Dance/Song	Judges' scores					Result
Week #	Dance/Song	Craig Revel Horwood	Darcey Bussell	Len Goodman	Bruno Tonioli	Total	Result
1	Waltz / With You I'm Born Again	6	6	6	7	25	Safe
2	Jive / Tutti Frutti	8	8	8	8	32	Safe
3	Foxtrot / You've Got a Friend in Me	8	8	8	8	32	Safe
4	Cha Cha Cha / Super Freak	7	7	7	7	28	Safe
5	Viennese Waltz / At Last	9	8	9	9	35	Safe
6	Paso Doble / Seven Nation Army	9	9	9	9	36	Safe
7	Charleston / Walk Like an Egyptian	9	10	10	10	39	Safe
8	American Smooth / Imagine	9	9	9	10	37	Safe
9	Salsa / Rhythm of the Night	8	8	8	8	32	Safe
10	Dance Fusion (Jive/Quickstep) / Reet Petite	8	9	9	9	35	Bottom two
11	Tango / Roxanne; Rumba / The First Time Ever I Saw Your Face	9; 9	10; 9	10; 10	10; 10	39; 38	Bottom two
12	Jive / Tutti Frutti; Showdance / What a Feeling; Charleston / Walk Like an Egyptian	9; 10; 10	10; 10; 10	10; 10; 10	10; 10; 10	39; 40; 40	Runner-up

- Series average for Denise and James: 35.1

=== Series 11 (2013) ===
In 2013, Strictly Come Dancing Jordan was partnered with Vanessa Feltz. The pair were the second couple to be eliminated in the third week.

Week #	Dance/Song	Judges' scores					Result
Week #	Dance/Song	Craig Revel Horwood	Darcey Bussell	Len Goodman	Bruno Tonioli	Total	Result
1	Cha-Cha-Cha / That Don't Impress Me Much	3	5	6	5	19	No Elimination
2	Waltz / Run to You	5	6	6	6	23	Safe
3	Tango / Lay All Your Love on Me	3	5	6	6	20	Eliminated

== Other television appearances ==
Jordan, together with Ola, took part in a celebrity version of television programme Total Wipeout which was broadcast on 26 December 2009. In 2013, Jordan took place in a celebrity version of Splash! for ITV's Text Santa.

In August 2014, James took part in fourteenth series of Celebrity Big Brother. He entered the house on Day 1 and finished in third place during the final. Jordan also made appearances on The Wright Stuff, Loose Women and This Morning.

Jordan and wife Ola appeared on Through the Keyhole in September 2015, with host Keith Lemon.

Jordan returned to Celebrity Big Brother in January 2017, for the nineteenth series as an "all star" housemate. He was the fourth celebrity to be evicted from the house.

In 2019, Jordan participated in the eleventh series of Dancing on Ice, alongside professional partner Alexandra Schauman. After receiving the most votes, Jordan and Schauman were crowned the winners of the series. He also appeared on the fourth series of Celebrity Coach Trip, alongside wife Ola.

In December 2024, Jordan portrayed Dandini in Cinderella at The Winding Wheel Theatre in Chesterfield.

== Personal life ==
Jordan married fellow professional dancer Ola Grabowska in October 2003. They had a daughter, born in 2020 via IVF after several years of fertility struggles. They lived together in Maidstone, Kent. In August 2026, it was announced that the couple had separated after almost 23 years of marriage.

== Filmography ==
Year	Title	Role	Notes
2006–2013	Strictly Come Dancing	Himself	Professional dancer
2009	Total Wipeout	Himself	Celebrity special
2012	Pointless	Himself	Celebrity special
2014	Celebrity Big Brother	Himself	Series 14
2015	Seven Days with...	Himself	Series 2, Episode 1
2015–2018	Big Brother's Bit on the Side	Himself	Panellist
2017	Celebrity Big Brother	Himself	Series 19
2019	Dancing on Ice	Himself	Series 11 winner
2019	Celebrity Coach Trip	Himself	Series 4
