= Ola Jordan =

Polish-born British ballroom dancer (born 1982)

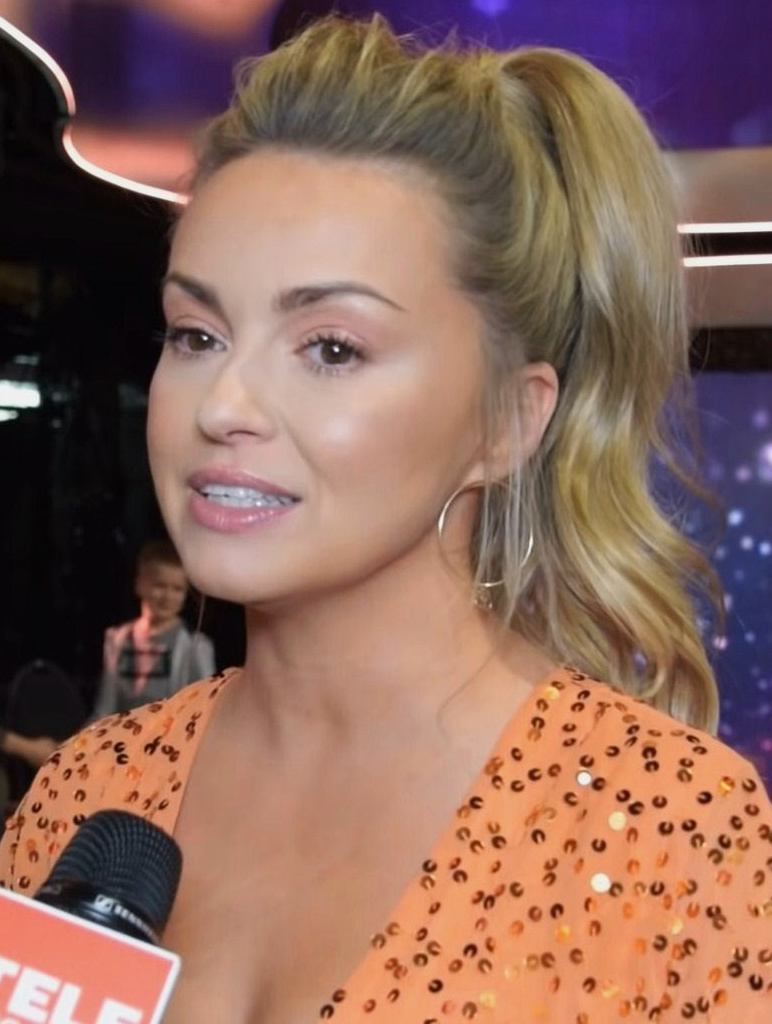
- Jordan on Dancing with the Stars. Taniec z gwiazdami in 2019
- Born: Aleksandra Grabowska; 30 September 1982 (age 44); Nasielsk, Poland
- Occupation: Professional dancer
- Known for: Strictly Come Dancing (2006-15); Dancing with the Stars. Taniec z gwiazdami (2018-19)
- Height: 1.62 m (5 ft 4 in)
- Spouse: James Jordan (m. 2003; sep. 2026)
- Children: 1
- Parents: Dariusz Grabowski (father); Janina Grabowska (mother)
- Website: JamesAndOla.com

Aleksandra "Ola" Jordan (née Grabowska; born 30 September 1982) is a Polish-British professional ballroom dancer, specialising in Latin American dancing. She appeared as a professional on the British BBC One television show Strictly Come Dancing (SCD) from 2006 to 2015, becoming champion in 2009. Prior to this, after winning a championship event in her native Poland, Aleksandra Grabowska moved to England and began a new partnership with James Jordan. They married in 2003, and separated in 2026. In 2016, she was contestant on the sixteenth series of I'm a Celebrity...Get Me Out of Here! and between 2018 and 2019, she served as a judge on Dancing with the Stars. Taniec z gwiazdami in Poland.

== Dancing career ==
Aleksandra Grabowska has been dancing since the age of ten when her school advertised a dance club. Before dancing with James Jordan, she had danced with Przemek 'John' Lowicki in Poland. She won Poland's Open Championships in 1999 aged seventeen, and went on to take 12th place in the following year's World Championships.

The first recorded dance by Ola Grabowska and James Jordan as a partnership was in the Dutch Open in November 2000, though they did not turn professional until 2003. The couple married in October 2003. They withdrew from competition dancing in order to teach Latin American dancing in Hong Kong for four years, though they turned professional again in 2005, after missing competing. In May 2006, the couple came second in the Blackpool Professional Rising Stars Latin event, and in November, they came third in the British Championships for Professional Latin. Ola and husband James first took part in the BBC One television show Strictly Come Dancing series 4 in 2006. In 2009, Ola won the Glitter Ball trophy with her celebrity dance partner, BBC sports reporter Chris Hollins in seventh series.

== Strictly Come Dancing ==
=== Highest and lowest scoring performances per dance ===
dance	partner	highest	partner	lowest
American Smooth	Ashley Taylor Dawson	31	Andrew Castle	17
Argentine Tango	Chris Hollins	34		
Cha-cha-cha	Chris Hollins	29	Iwan Thomas	13
Charleston	Chris Hollins	40	Steve Backshall	26
Foxtrot	Chris Hollins	37	Paul Daniels	21
Jive	Ashley Taylor Dawson	31	Chris Hollins	22
Paso doble	Ashley Taylor Dawson	35	Kenny Logan	21
Quickstep	Ashley Taylor Dawson	35	Chris Hollins	23
Rumba	Ashley Taylor Dawson	35	Paul Daniels	16
Salsa	Ashley Taylor Dawson	35	Sid Owen	22
Samba	Chris Hollins	31	Kenny Logan	18
Showdance	Chris Hollins	37		
Tango	Ashley Taylor Dawson	33	Iwan Thomas; Sid Owen	17
Viennese Waltz	Ashley Taylor Dawson	31	Andrew Castle	24
Waltz	Ashley Taylor Dawson	35	Kenny Logan	21

DJ Spoony is the only celebrity not to appear on this list.

Jordan first appeared on Strictly Come Dancing during the show's fourth series in 2006, partnering DJ Spoony. They were eliminated in the third round, a result which disappointed some of the audience. In series five, she danced with Scottish rugby player Kenny Logan while her husband James danced with Kenny's wife, TV presenter Gabby Logan. This was the first time two married couples had competed against each other. Kenny was voted out of the show on the ninth week while Gabby Logan was voted out earlier, in the fourth week. Jordan was knocked out of series 6 in week seven of the competition, with her partner GMTV presenter Andrew Castle.

In January–February 2009 Jordan danced with Kenny Logan on the Strictly Come Dancing Tour, and in series 7, she partnered BBC television sports reporter Chris Hollins, reaching the final and beating rivals Ricky Whittle and Natalie Lowe to become the 2009 champions. Their prize was a Strictly Come Dancing glitter ball. Jordan and Hollins became affectionately known as 'Team Cola' by viewers and on the show, with Cola being a portmanteau of 'Chris' and 'Ola'.

Jordan partnered magician Paul Daniels in the eighth season of the show; they were the second couple to be voted off. For Children in Need 2010, Jordan partnered Harry Judd from the band McFly for a one-off Strictly special, dancing a Paso Doble. The couple won, beating Rochelle Wiseman of The Saturdays and her partner Ian Waite.

In the ninth series of the show, she was partnered with former Wales international footballer Robbie Savage. They were the ninth couple voted out on 4 December 2011.

In September 2012, during the show's tenth series, Jordan was partnered with EastEnders actor Sid Owen. The couple were eliminated on Halloween week in October 2012.

For the eleventh series in September 2013, Jordan competed with former Hollyoaks actor and singer Ashley Taylor Dawson. They got as far as the 11th week before being voted out.

In September 2014, for the show's twelfth series, Jordan was partnered with wildlife expert, presenter of the popular children's show Deadly 60 and its spinoffs, Steve Backshall. They were eliminated in week 9 (22/23 November 2014). On 7 October 2014, Jordan and Backshall appeared on BBC Radio 1's Innuendo Bingo.

On 5 September 2015, Strictly Come Dancing revealed Jordan would dance with sports commentator and Olympic medalist Iwan Thomas for the upcoming thirteenth series. They were the first couple to leave the competition on 4 October 2015. Shortly after their elimination, Jordan announced this was to be her last series of Strictly Come Dancing as she would not be returning in the following series. She made her last appearance when she was featured in a group dance for the Series 13 Final.

Strictly Come Dancing summary
series	celebrity partner	place	average score
4	DJ Spoony	11th	27.0
5	Kenny Logan	5th	24.0
6	Andrew Castle	10th	21.4
7	Chris Hollins	1st	31.0
8	Paul Daniels	13th	17.5
9	Robbie Savage	6th	27.2
10	Sid Owen	12th	20.7
11	Ashley Taylor Dawson	6th	32.5
12	Steve Backshall	8th	26.7
13	Iwan Thomas	15th	15.0

=== DJ Spoony ===
Strictly Come Dancing fourth series (2006) results
week no.	dance / song	judges' score					result
week no.	dance / song	Horwood	Phillips	Goodman	Tonioli	total	result
1	Cha-cha-cha / "Kiss"	5	7	8	7	27	safe
3	Tango / "Tango D'Amour"	6	7	7	7	27	eliminated

=== Kenny Logan ===
Strictly Come Dancing fifth series (2007) results
week no.	dance / song	judges' score					result
week no.	dance / song	Horwood	Phillips	Goodman	Tonioli	total	result
1	Waltz / "Are You Lonesome Tonight"	4	5	6	6	21	bottom two
3	Tango / "Call Me"	6	6	7	6	25	safe
4	Samba / "Mujer Latina"	3	4	6	5	18	safe
5	Paso Doble / "Take Me Out"	4	5	6	6	21	safe
6	Viennese Waltz / "Flower of Scotland"	5	7	8	6	26	safe
7	Cha-Cha-Cha / "Billie Jean"	4	5	7	6	22	safe
8	American Smooth / "How Sweet It Is"	6	8	8	8	30	safe
9	Foxtrot / "They Can't Take That Away From Me; Rumba / "Fields of Gold"	7; 4	7; 5	8; 7	8; 7	30; 23	eliminated

=== Andrew Castle ===
Strictly Come Dancing sixth series (2008) results
week no.	dance / song	judges' score					result
week no.	dance / song	Horwood	Phillips	Goodman	Tonioli	total	result
1	Cha-cha-cha / "Mercy"	4	6	7	6	23	safe
3	Tango / "20th Century Boy"	4	6	7	5	22	safe
5	American Smooth / "You Know I'm No Good"	3	4	5	5	17	safe
6	Viennese Waltz / "Annie's Song"	5	6	7	6	24	safe
7	Samba / "Ain't It Funny"	4	5	7	5	21	eliminated

=== Chris Hollins ===
Strictly Come Dancing seventh series (2009) results
week no.	dance / song	judges' score						result
week no.	dance / song	Horwood	Bussell*	Goodman	Dixon	Tonioli	total	result
1	Tango / "Sharp Dressed Man"	6	–	7	7	6	26	safe
1	Rumba / "Don't Know Much"	7	–	8	7	8	30	safe
3	Quickstep / "Dancing Fool"	5	–	6	6	6	23	safe
4	Salsa / "Micaela"	5	–	6	7	7	25	safe
5	Jive / "Roll Over Beethoven"	5	–	6	6	5	22	safe
6	American Smooth / "Jimmy Mack"	7	–	7	7	7	28	safe
7	Cha-Cha-Cha / "Shake Your Groove Thing"	7	–	8	7	7	29	safe
8	Foxtrot / "I Could Have Danced All Night"	8	–	9	9	8	34	safe
9	Paso Doble / "I Believe in a Thing Called Love"	6	–	8	9	7	30	safe
10	Viennese Waltz / "A New Day Has Come"	7	–	8	7	7	29	safe
11	Charleston / "Fat Sam's Grandslam"	8	–	8	9	9	34	safe
12	Waltz / "At This Moment"	8	8	8	9	8	41	safe
12	Samba / "Cuba"	8	8	8	8	7	39	safe
13	Rumba / "Total Eclipse of the Heart"	7	7	8	8	8	38	safe
13	Argentine Tango / "Bust Your Windows"	8	8	9	9	8	42	safe
14	Foxtrot / "I Could Have Danced All Night"	9	9	9	10	9	46	winners
14	Lindy Hop / "Sing Sing Sing"	8	9	9	9	9	44	winners
14	Charleston / "Fat Sam's Grandslam"	10	10	10	10	10	50	winners
14	Showdance / "Do You Love Me"	9	9	9	10	9	46	winners

- Darcey Bussell joined the judging panel for the last three weeks of the show.

=== Paul Daniels ===
Strictly Come Dancing eighth series (2010) results
week no.	dance / song	judges' score					result
week no.	dance / song	Horwood	Goodman	Dixon	Tonioli	total	result
1	Cha-Cha-Cha / "Could It Be Magic"	2	5	5	4	16	n/a
2	Foxtrot / "Lady Luck"	4	6	6	5	21	safe
3	Rumba / "Take a Bow"	2	5	5	4	16	eliminated

=== Robbie Savage ===
Strictly Come Dancing ninth series (2011) results
week no.	dance / song	judges' score					result
week no.	dance / song	Horwood	Goodman	Dixon	Tonioli	total	result
1	Cha-Cha-Cha / "Bad Boys"	2	6	6	5	19	safe
2	Foxtrot / "Ain't That a Kick in the Head?"	7	8	7	7	29	safe
3	Tango / "Gimme! Gimme! Gimme! (A Man After Midnight)"	7	7	8	8	30	safe
4	Jive / "Love Man"	5	8	7	7	27	safe
5	Paso Doble / "Bad"	4	7	8	7	26	safe
6	Waltz / "Love Ain't Here Anymore"	6	8	8	7	29	safe
7	American Smooth / "Sway"	7	8	8	8	31	safe
8	Salsa / "Let Me Entertain You"	5	7	7	7	26	safe
9	Samba / "You Sexy Thing"	5	7	7	6	25	safe
10	Quickstep / "Little Green Bag"	7	7	8	8	30	eliminated

=== Sid Owen ===
Strictly Come Dancing tenth series (2012) results
week no.	dance / song	judges' score					result
week no.	dance / song	Horwood	Bussell	Goodman	Tonioli	total	result
1	Waltz / "I Won't Give Up"	6	6	7	7	26	safe
2	Salsa / "Hips Don't Lie"	6	6	5	5	22	safe
3	Tango / "Here I Go Again"	4	4	5	4	17	safe
4	Cha-Cha-Cha / "Ghostbusters"	2	5	5	5	17	eliminated

=== Ashley Taylor Dawson ===
Strictly Come Dancing eleventh series (2013) results
week no.	dance / song	judges' score					result
week no.	dance / song	Horwood	Bussell	Goodman	Tonioli	total	result
1	Cha-Cha-Cha / "What Makes You Beautiful"	6	7	7	7	27	safe
2	American Smooth / "Beyond the Sea"	7	8	8	8	31	safe
3	Samba / "Love Is in the Air"	7	8	7	8	30	safe
4	Viennese Waltz / "Angel"	7	8	8	8	31	safe
5	Jive / "Johnny B. Goode"	7	8	8	8	31	safe
6	Tango / "Beautiful Monster"	8	9	8	8	33	safe
7	Quickstep / "Are You Gonna Be My Girl"	8	9	9	9	35	safe
8	Paso Doble / "You Give Love a Bad Name"	8	9	9	9	35	safe
9	Waltz / "I Will Always Love You"	8	9	9	9	35	safe
10	Rumba / "A Whole New World"	8	9	9	9	35	bottom two
11	Salsa / "Conga"	8	9	9	9	35	eliminated

=== Steve Backshall ===
Strictly Come Dancing twelfth series (2014) results
week no.	dance / song	judges' score						result
week no.	dance / song	Horwood	Bussell	Osmond*	Goodman	Tonioli	total	result
1	Tango / "Born to Be Wild"	6	6	-	7	7	26	safe
2	Cha-Cha-Cha / "Treasure"	3	6	-	6	6	21	safe
3	Quickstep / "I Wan'na Be Like You"	6	7	6	7	8	34	safe
4	Salsa / "Jump in the Line (Shake, Senora)"	6	7	-	7	7	27	safe
5	Waltz / "I Wonder Why"	7	8	-	7	8	30	safe
6	Charleston / "Dem Bones"	5	7	-	7	7	26	safe
7	Paso Doble / "Use Somebody"	6	8	-	7	7	28	safe
8	American Smooth / "Rolling in the Deep"	7	8	-	8	8	31	safe
9	Jive / "Little Bitty Pretty One"	4	7	-	6	6	23	eliminated

- Donny Osmond joined the judging panel for Movie Week in week three.

=== Iwan Thomas ===
Strictly Come Dancing thirteenth series (2015) results
week no.	dance / song	judges' score					result
week no.	dance / song	Horwood	Bussell	Goodman	Tonioli	total	result
1	Tango / "Keep on Running"	3	5	5	4	17	none
2	Cha-cha-cha / "Sexy and I Know It"	2	4	4	3	13	eliminated

== Other television appearances ==
Ola and James Jordan took part in a celebrity version of television programme Total Wipeout which was broadcast on 26 December 2009. In 2010, she and Strictly Come Dancing head judge Len Goodman appeared as a team in the BBC programme Bargain Hunt for the benefit of the Children in Need appeal. Ola and James Jordan also took part in the judging panel on the television show Dancing on Wheels in 2010, and the couple also appeared on All Star Mr & Mrs in 2013, where they won the show. Ola and James appeared on an episode of Through the Keyhole in September 2015, as celebrity homeowners.

In December 2014, Jordan was announced as one of the celebrity competitors for the Channel 4 series The Jump, a television show which requires celebrities to compete in events such as skeleton, ski jumping, bobsleigh, slalom, and ski cross. While practicing for the series, Jordan fell during a training run. The resulting injury forced Jordan to withdraw from The Jump, and also prevented her from participating in the Series 12 finale of Strictly Come Dancing. The fall caused Jordan to suffer a torn ligament in her knee, an injury which required Jordan to undergo surgery.

In November 2016, she took part in the sixteenth series of I'm a Celebrity...Get Me Out of Here!; she was the third celebrity to be voted out of the jungle.

In February 2018, Polish broadcaster Polsat announced that Jordan would replace Beata Tyszkiewicz as a judge on Dancing with the Stars: Taniec z gwiazdami (Polish version of Strictly Come Dancing). She departed in 2019 after two series.

In 2019, she appeared on the fourth series of Celebrity Coach Trip alongside husband James.

== Personal life ==
Jordan married fellow professional dancer James Jordan in October 2003. They had a daughter, born in 2020 via IVF after several years of fertility struggles. They lived together in Maidstone, Kent. In August 2026, it was announced that the couple had separated after almost 23 years of marriage.
