= Muscle & Fitness (British magazine) =

British fitness magazine

Cover

Muscle & Fitness is a British fitness magazine, which contains articles on strength and fitness training, diet plans and strategies for men and women, and tips and advice.

== History ==
In 1940, health and fitness pioneer Joe Weider created a newsletter called ‘Your Physique’, which evolved into Muscle & Fitness, Weider Publications' very first magazine – and its flagship brand. Today, Muscle & Fitness is printed in 16 local editions in more than 22 countries, reaching a worldwide audience of over 7 million readers.

== Editorial mix ==
It contains a varied mix of features and information on training, nutrition, sports medicine, fashion and technology. Each month its staff answer readers' questions and personal training techniques are demonstrated by fitness professionals.
