= Strictly Come Dancing series 24 =

Strictly Come Dancing
- Series 24
- Presented by: Emma Willis; Josh Widdicombe; Johannes Radebe
- Judges: Shirley Ballas; Anton Du Beke; Motsi Mabuse; Craig Revel Horwood
- No. of episodes: 12

Release
- Original network: BBC One
- Original release: 19 September 2026 – present

Series chronology
- ← Previous; Series 23

Strictly Come Dancing returned for its twenty-fourth series with a launch show broadcast on 19 September 2026 on BBC One, with the live shows beginning a week later. Emma Willis, Josh Widdicombe and Johannes Radebe replaced Tess Daly and Claudia Winkleman as hosts, following their departures after the previous series, whilst Ellie Taylor became the new presenter of Strictly Come Dancing: It Takes Two, replacing Fleur East and Janette Manrara. Craig Revel Horwood, Motsi Mabuse, Shirley Ballas and Anton Du Beke returned to the judging panel. The series marked a notable revamp within the show's history, with a replacement of the presenters and the show's logo had changed for the first time since the eighth series.

== Format ==
The couples dance each week in a live show. The judges score each performance out of ten. After all the couples have danced they are then ranked according to the judges' scores and given points according to their rank, with the highest ranked couple receiving a number of points equal to the number of couples dancing that week, for instance, seven points where there are seven couples dancing. When there are no tied scores the lowest scored couple will receive one point. However, in the event of a tie where two or more couples obtain the same judges score, the couple below those in the tie will be awarded one point below the points awarded to each of the tied couples. For example, if two couples obtain the same rank and obtain seven points each, the couple immediately below them will be awarded six points. When couples are ranked equally by the judges the scoring of all other couples underneath will follow in the same descending order. Should there be any tied scores the lowest scored couple will therefore receive more than one point from the judges scores. The public are also invited to vote for their favourite couples, and the couples are ranked again according to the number of votes they receive, again receiving points; the couple with the most votes receiving the most points. Again in the unlikely event of a tie in the public vote the points are awarded in the same way as the points from the judges score.

The points for judges' score and public vote are then added together, and the two couples with the fewest points are placed in the bottom two. If two couples have equal points, the points from the public vote are given precedence. As with the previous series, the bottom two couples have to perform a dance-off on the results show. Based on that performance alone, each judge then votes on which couple should stay and which couple should leave. The casting vote in the dance-off is rotated, with a different judge making the decision each week.

== Production ==
Hosts and Judges of Strictly Come Dancing series 24

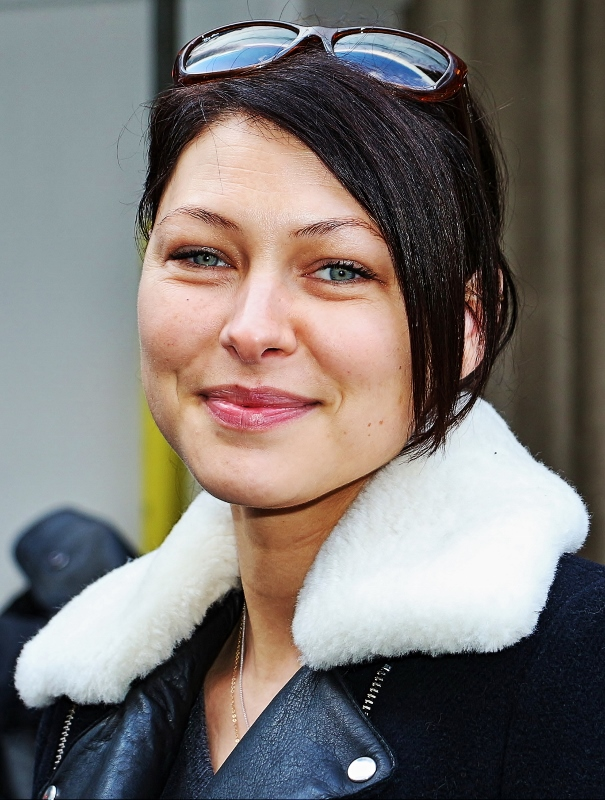
Emma Willis

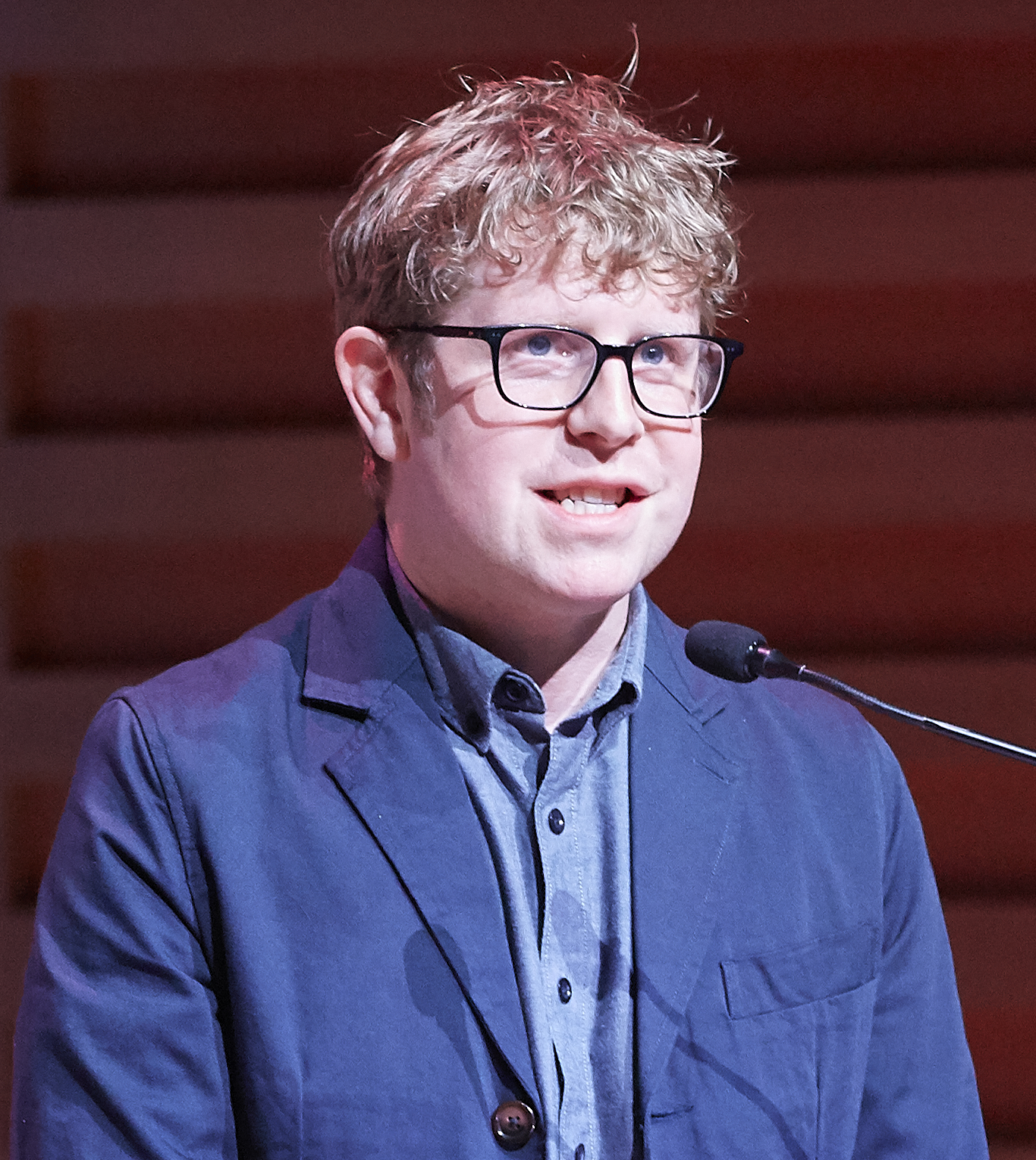
Josh Widdicombe

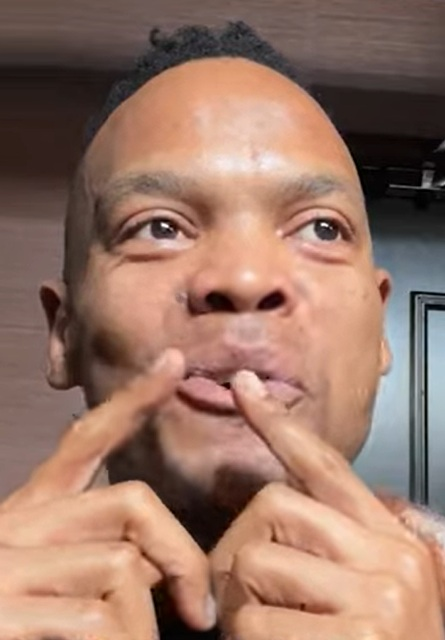
Johannes Radebe

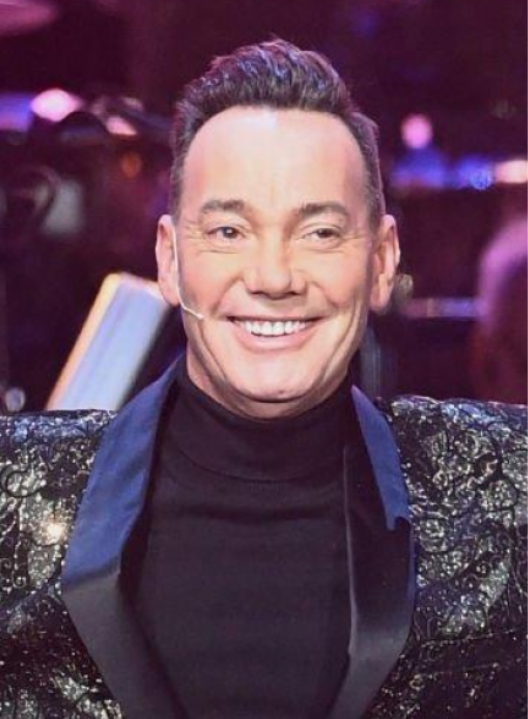
Craig Revel Horwood

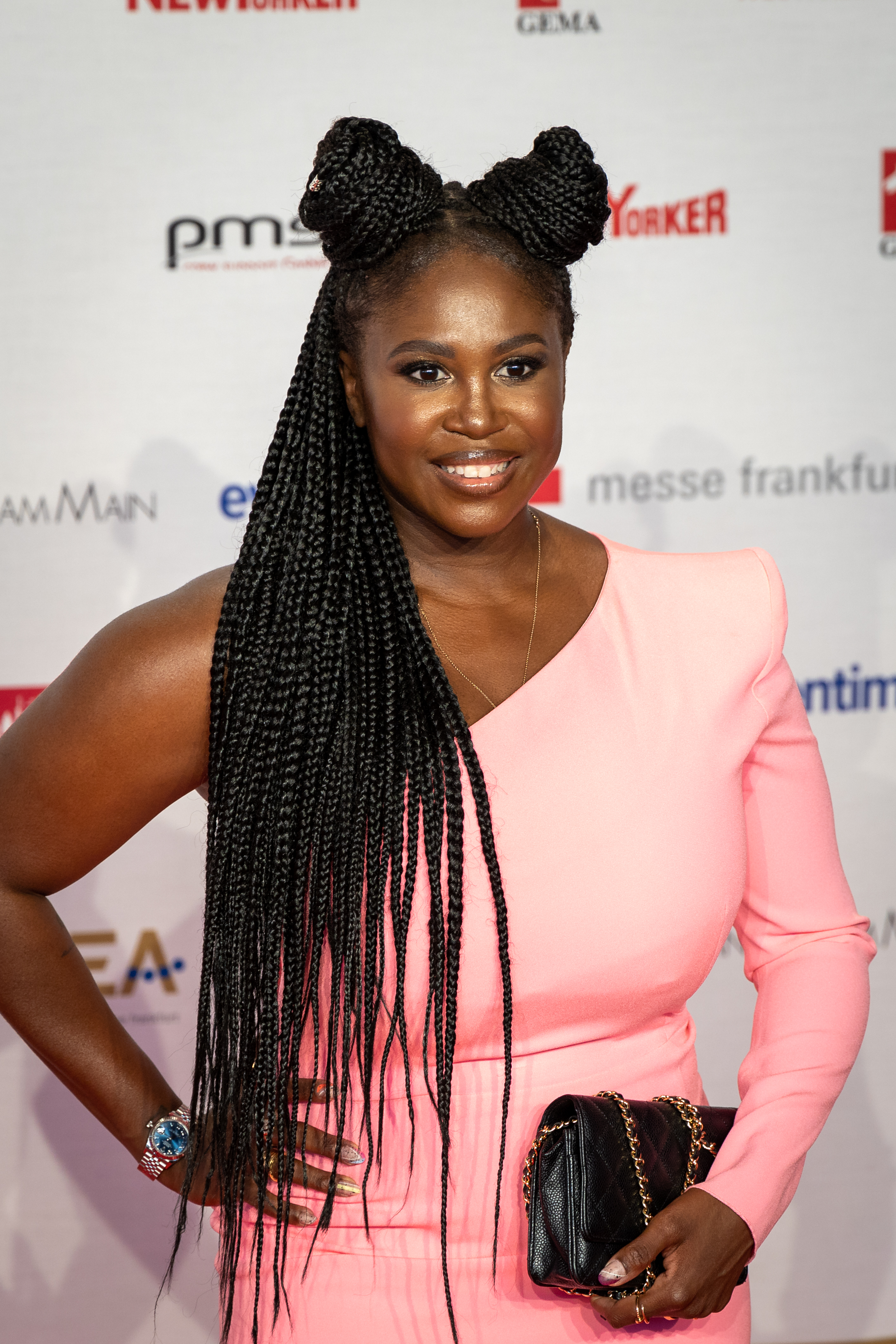
Motsi Mabuse

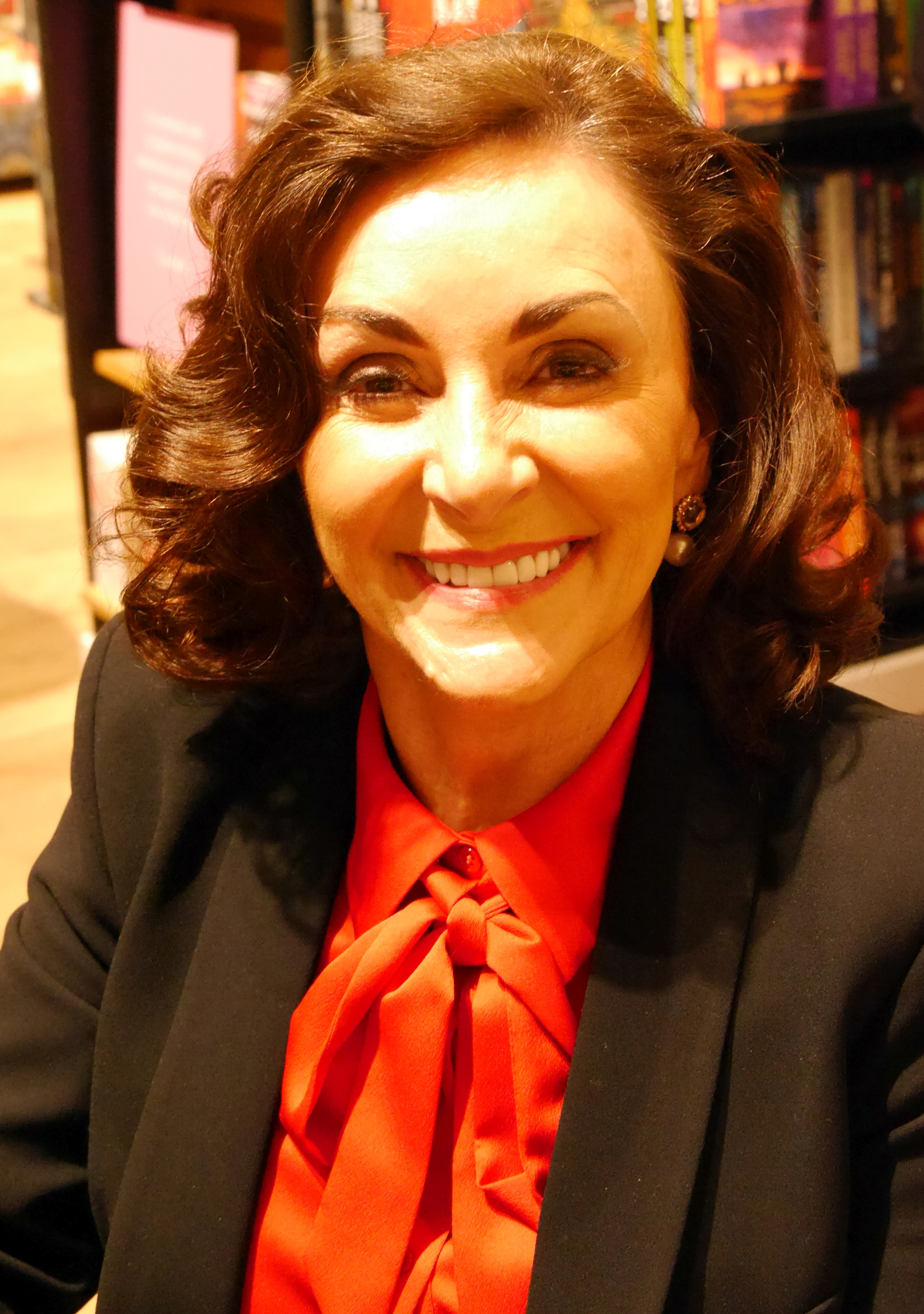
Shirley Ballas

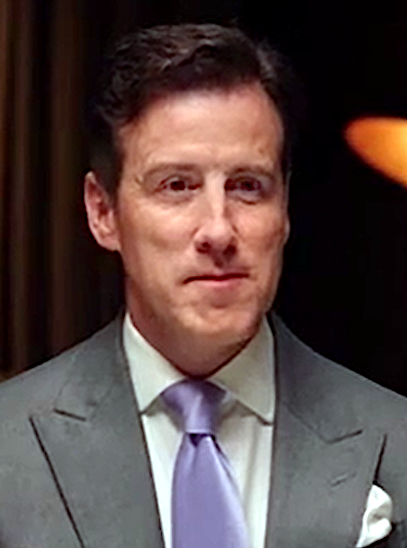
Anton Du Beke

In October 2025, while the previous series was in production, hosts Tess Daly and Claudia Winkleman announced their departures from the show. In a joint statement, they said "We have loved working as a duo and hosting Strictly Come Dancing has been an absolute dream. We were always going to leave together and now feels like the right time." The BBC subsequently began holding auditions for new presenters, who subsequently held "chemistry tests" prior to the decision. Several presenters and former contestants were rumoured to become new presenters, including former Strictly Come Dancing: It Takes Two host and series 3 contestant Zoe Ball, then It Takes Two host and series 20 contestant Fleur East, former It Takes Two host Rylan Clark, series 9 contestant and The One Show presenter Alex Jones, series 21 contestant Angela Scanlon, series 12 contestant Alison Hammond and series 23 contestant La Voix, as well as Bradley Walsh, Tom Allen and Emma Willis. In May 2026, Ball confirmed she had auditioned as presenter, but was rejected for the role, stating that she had "worked through the 7 stages of rejection and grief". Clark, Sara Cox, Clara Amfo, and Siân Welby all confirmed later that they had participated in screen tests for the roles, along with several others. East also confirmed that she would not be presenting the series, stating that she felt she would be acceptable with "not doing it or not being considered for the job", but said she was "kind of bothered."

On 19 May 2026, it was confirmed that Emma Willis, Josh Widdicombe and Johannes Radebe would present the series. Widdicombe previously appeared as a contestant on the 2024 Christmas Special, while Radebe had appeared as a professional dancer since the sixteenth series. It marks the first time that the show had been regularly presented by three hosts. In August 2026, it was announced on Willis' BBC Radio 2 show that series 20 contestant Ellie Taylor would become the new presenter of the spin-off show Strictly Come Dancing: It Takes Two, replacing East and Janette Manrara. It was later revealed that comedian Abi Clarke and series 20 contestant Tyler West would host Strictly: Lights Up, a new spin-off series which streams on BBC iPlayer after every Sunday results show. Clarke also hosted weekly training room episodes, where she visited different couples in rehearsals. CBBC introduced Strictly Pro Dance Off, a dance tutorial and competition series featuring the professional dancers that is also broadcast as a segment on Saturday mornings during Saturday Mash-Up!.

=== Professional dancers ===
In March 2026, it was reported that several professional dancers would be leaving the show. Later that month, Karen Hauer, the show's longest serving female professional who had appeared since the tenth series, confirmed her departure and said that it was "the right time" to leave the show and focus on other projects. Nadiya Bychkova, who had served as a professional since the fifteenth series was also announced to be leaving the show, and said in a statement that the show had "allowed [her] to discover new sides of [herself], develop new skills, and evolve as an artist in ways [she would] always be grateful for." Luba Mushtuk, who joined the show during the sixteenth series, also confirmed her departure, and thanked the show for "the amazing opportunity and unforgettable memories" adding that "it [had] truly meant the world to [her]". Michelle Tsiakkas, who joined during the twentieth series, subsequently confirmed she had been dismissed from the show. Tsiakkas said she was told via a Zoom call that her contract had not been renewed and said that her "dream was shattered", as well as that she was "grieving for her job". She ultimately decided not to participate in Strictly: The Professionals tour. The following month, Gorka Márquez, a professional since the fourteenth series, was the final professional to confirm to be leaving the show, following his reduced role the previous series due to his commitments as a judge on the Spanish version of the show Bailando con las estrellas. Márquez said that being part of Strictly Come Dancing had been "so much more than just a professional opportunity", adding that "it allowed [him] to build a career from [his] passion", and that he would "forever be thankful."

In May 2026, the BBC confirmed that Dianne Buswell, Julian Caillon, Vito Coppola, Amy Dowden, Carlos Gu, Katya Jones, Neil Jones, Nikita Kuzmin, Lauren Oakley, Jowita Przystał, Johannes Radebe, Aljaž Škorjanec, Alexis Warr, Kai Widdrington and Nancy Xu would all be returning for this series. Radebe was later confirmed to be co-presenting the show. In July 2026, five new professional dancers were announced for the series: Aleksandra Isaeva, Maddie Ingoldsby, Mark Karmalita, Lethabo Monametsi and Cristian Priori.

During the launch show, Neil Jones, Aleksandra Isaeva, Cristian Priori and Lethabo Monametsi did not receive a celebrity partner, while the rest were paired up, including new professionals Maddie Ingoldsby and Mark Karmalita.

== Couples ==
On 10 June 2026, Lacey Turner was announced as the first contestant to be competing in the series. Following her withdrawal from the previous series prior to the first week due to an ankle injury, Dani Dyer was announced to be returning as a contestant for this series. Celebrity reveals continued over the next two months, before the line-up was completed on 12 August 2026.

Celebrity	Notability	Professional partner	Status
Chris Appleton	Celebrity hairstylist	Amy Dowden	Eliminated 1st on 4 October 2026
Melanie Walters	Gavin & Stacey actress	Aljaž Škorjanec	Eliminated 2nd on 11 October 2026
Sarah Storey	Paralympic cyclist & swimmer	Julian Caillon	Eliminated 3rd on 18 October 2026
Shaun Wright-Phillips	England footballer & pundit	Alexis Warr	Eliminated 4th on 25 October 2026
Lawrence Robb	Emmerdale actor	Jowita Przystał	Eliminated 5th on 1 November 2026
Bethany Antonia	House of the Dragon actress	Nancy Xu	Eliminated 6th on 8 November 2026
Will Best	Television & radio presenter	Dianne Buswell	Eliminated 7th on 15 November 2026
Jaime Winstone	Film & television actress	Carlos Gu	Eliminated 8th on 22 November 2026
Cach Mercer	Love Island winner	Maddie Ingoldsby	Participating
Dani Dyer	Television personality	Nikita Kuzmin	Participating
Delta Goodrem	Singer-songwriter & actress	Kai Widdrington; Aljaž Škorjanec (Week 8)	Participating
Graeme Hall	Dogs Behaving (Very) Badly trainer	Lauren Oakley	Participating
John Nellis	Social media personality	Katya Jones	Participating
Lacey Turner	EastEnders actress	Vito Coppola	Participating
Tabby Stoecker	Olympic skeleton racer	Mark Karmalita	Participating

== Scoring chart ==
The highest score each week is indicated in bold with a dagger (†), while the lowest score each week is indicated in italicized with a double-dagger (‡).

Colour key:

Winners
Co-runners-up
Bottom two (Note: Week 6 had the bottom three couples competing)
Eliminated
Excused from competition for the week

Strictly Come Dancing series 24 - Weekly scores
Couple	Pl.	Week													
Couple	Pl.	1	2	1+2	3	4	5	6	7	8	9	10	11	12	13
Cach & Maddie		20	29	49	31	**34**†	24	33	26‡	**39**†	**39**†				
Dani & Nikita		22	23	45	27	25	31	32	**36**†	30	35				
Delta & Kai		29	30	**59**†	**33**†	(Note: This couple was excused from competing due to illness or injury, and was granted a bye to the following week.)	34	33	31	35	36				
Graeme & Lauren		24	**31**†	55	25	28	31	25‡	28	27‡	32‡				
John & Katya		**31**†	23	54	20	29	32	35	26‡	31	**39**†				
Lacey & Vito		27	28	55	26	29	28	**36**†	30	27‡	35				
Tabby & Mark		22	28	50	31	29	**37**†	25‡	33	30	**39**†				
Jaime & Carlos	8th	21	21	42	28	**34**†	25	27		33	32‡				
Will & Dianne	9th	18	19	37	25	31	31	32	29	27‡					
Bethany & Nancy	10th	26	27	53	27	27	25	30	30						
Lawrence & Jowita	11th	20	19	39	20	30	19	26							
Shaun & Alexis	12th	15‡	25	40	15‡	28	17‡								
Sarah & Julian	13th	15‡	24	39	20	21‡									
Melanie & Aljaž	14th	15‡	15‡	30‡	17										
Chris & Amy	15th	16	17	33											

=== Average chart ===
This table only counts for dances scored on a 40-points scale.

Couple	Rank by average	Place	Total points	Number of dances	Total average
Delta & Kai	1		261	8	32.6
Cach & Maddie	2		275	9	30.5
Tabby & Mark	3		274	9	30.4
John & Katya	4		266	9	29.5
Lacey & Vito	4		266	9	29.5
Dani & Nikita	6		261	9	29.0
Graeme & Lauren	7		251	9	27.8
Jaime & Carlos	8	8th	221	8	27.6
Bethany & Nancy	9	10th	192	7	27.4
Will & Dianne	10	9th	212	8	26.5
Lawrence & Jowita	11	11th	134	6	22.3
Shaun & Alexis	12	12th	100	5	20.0
Sarah & Julian	12	13th	80	4	20.0
Chris & Amy	14	15th	33	2	16.5
Melanie & Aljaž	15	14th	47	3	15.7

== Weekly scores ==
Unless indicated otherwise, individual judges scores in the charts below (given in parentheses) are listed in this order from left to right: Craig Revel Horwood, Motsi Mabuse, Shirley Ballas, Anton Du Beke.

=== Week 1 ===
Each couple performed one unlearned dance. There was no elimination this week; all scores carried over to the following week.

Couples are listed in the order they performed.

Couple	Scores	Dance	Music
Will & Dianne	18 (4, 5, 4, 5)	Samba	"Rock DJ" — Robbie Williams
Tabby & Mark	22 (4, 6, 5, 7)	Jive	"Animal" — Katseye
Sarah & Julian	15 (3, 4, 4, 4)	Quickstep	"C'est Magnifique" — Kay Starr
Lawrence & Jowita	20 (4, 5, 5, 6)	Paso doble	"Aperture" — Harry Styles
Shaun & Alexis	15 (2, 4, 4, 5)	Cha-cha-cha	"Lil Boo Thang" — Paul Russell
Bethany & Nancy	26 (6, 7, 6, 7)	Quickstep	"Stop This Flame" — Celeste
Lacey & Vito	27 (7, 6, 7, 7)	Cha-cha-cha	"How Will I Know" — Whitney Houston
Chris & Amy	16 (3, 4, 4, 5)	Tango	"No Roots" — Alice Merton
Melanie & Aljaž	15 (2, 4, 4, 5)	Cha-cha-cha	"Don't Go Breaking My Heart" — Elton John & Kiki Dee
Cach & Maddie	20 (3, 6, 5, 6)	Quickstep	"I Just Might" — Bruno Mars
Graeme & Lauren	24 (6, 6, 6, 6)	Cha-cha-cha	"Hound Dog" — from Smokey Joe's Cafe
Jaime & Carlos	21 (5, 5, 5, 6)	Tango	"I Feel Love" — Donna Summer
Dani & Nikita	22 (6, 5, 5, 6)	Samba	"Lush Life" — Zara Larsson
John & Katya	31 (7, 8, 8, 8)	Foxtrot	"Ordinary" — Alex Warren
Delta & Kai	29 (7, 8, 7, 7)	Samba	Baianá — Barbatuques

=== Week 2: Movie Week ===
- Musical guests: Tim Minchin — "Quiet" (from Matilda the Musical)

Each couple performed one unlearned dance to famous film songs. For the first time in the show's history, all couples participated in a themed week of the competition. Craig Revel Horwood had the casting vote.

Couples are listed in the order they performed.

Couple	Scores	Dance	Music	Film	Result
Dani & Nikita	23 (6, 6, 5, 6)	Foxtrot	"Beauty and the Beast"	Beauty and the Beast	Safe
John & Katya	23 (4, 5, 7, 7)	Couple's choice	"An Irish Party in Third Class"	Titanic	Safe
Delta & Kai	30 (8, 7, 7, 8)	American Smooth	"I'll Never Love Again"	A Star Is Born	Safe
Chris & Amy	17 (4, 4, 4, 5)	Cha-cha-cha	"I'm Always Here"	Baywatch	Eliminated
Lawrence & Jowita	19 (4, 5, 4, 6)	Viennese waltz	"Le Festin"	Ratatouille	Safe
Sarah & Julian	24 (6, 6, 6, 6)	Charleston	"Supercalifragilisticexpialidocious"	Mary Poppins	Safe
Graeme & Lauren	31 (8, 8, 8, 7)	Waltz	"The Godfather Theme"	The Godfather	Safe
Will & Dianne	19 (4, 5, 5, 5)	Foxtrot	"Old Time Rock and Roll"	Risky Business	Safe
Jaime & Carlos	21 (5, 5, 5, 6)	Cha-cha-cha	"Oh, Pretty Woman"	Pretty Woman	Bottom two
Melanie & Aljaž	15 (3, 4, 4, 4)	Waltz	"Edelweiss"	The Sound of Music	Safe
Cach & Maddie	29 (7, 7, 7, 8)	Samba	"We Go Together"	Grease	Safe
Tabby & Mark	28 (7, 7, 7, 7)	American Smooth	"Rewrite the Stars"	The Greatest Showman	Safe
Bethany & Nancy	27 (7, 7, 6, 7)	Paso doble	"No Good Deed"	Wicked: For Good	Safe
Lacey & Vito	28 (6, 7, 7, 8)	Quickstep	"I Knew It, I Knew You"	Toy Story 5	Safe
Shaun & Alexis	25 (4, 7, 7, 7)	Salsa	"You Should Be Dancing"	Saturday Night Fever	Safe

Judges' votes to save

- Mabuse: Jaime & Carlos
- Ballas: Jaime & Carlos
- Du Beke: Jaime & Carlos
- Revel Horwood: Did not vote, but would have voted to save Jaime & Carlos.

=== Week 3 ===
- Musical guests: Jalen Ngonda — "Burning Temptation"

Each couple performed one unlearned dance. Anton Du Beke had the casting vote.

Couples are listed in the order they performed.

Couple	Scores	Dance	Music	Result
Lacey & Vito	26 (6, 6, 7, 7)	Samba	"Bamboléo" — Gipsy Kings	Safe
Will & Dianne	25 (6, 6, 6, 7)	Waltz	"With You I'm Born Again" — Billy Preston & Syreeta Wright	Safe
Shaun & Alexis	15 (3, 4, 3, 5)	Quickstep	"I'm a Believer" — The Monkees	Bottom two
Cach & Maddie	31 (7, 8, 8, 8)	Couple's choice	"Beware... The South London Lover Boy" — Raye	Safe
Jaime & Carlos	28 (7, 7, 7, 7)	Viennese waltz	"Never Tear Us Apart" — INXS	Safe
Melanie & Aljaž	17 (3, 5, 4, 5)	Charleston	"Ooh Aah... Just a Little Bit" — Gina G / "Saturday Night" — Whigfield	Eliminated
Sarah & Julian	20 (4, 5, 5, 6)	Paso doble	"California Dreamin'" — Sia	Safe
Delta & Kai	33 (8, 9, 8, 8)	Salsa	"Always There" — Incognito feat. Jocelyn Brown / "Ain't Nobody" — Rufus & Chaka Khan	Safe
Lawrence & Jowita	20 (5, 5, 4, 6)	Rumba	"Back to Friends" — Sombr	Safe
Dani & Nikita	27 (7, 7, 6, 7)	Tango	"Show Me Love" — Robin S.	Safe
Graeme & Lauren	25 (6, 6, 6, 7)	Jive	"Reet Petite" — Jackie Wilson	Safe
John & Katya	20 (4, 5, 5, 6)	Cha-cha-cha	"Rock Your Body" — Justin Timberlake	Safe
Bethany & Nancy	27 (6, 7, 7, 7)	American Smooth	"Love Song" — Sara Bareilles	Safe
Tabby & Mark	31 (8, 8, 7, 8)	Argentine tango	"Hate That I Made You Love Me" — Ariana Grande	Safe

Judges' votes to save

- Revel Horwood: Shaun & Alexis
- Mabuse: Melanie & Aljaž
- Ballas: Shaun & Alexis
- Du Beke: Shaun & Alexis

=== Week 4: Icons Week ===
- Musical guests: Belles — "Son of Jolene"

Each couple performed one unlearned dance to a song by a popular musical icon, with the celebrity appearing in the guise of their icon. Shirley Ballas had the casting vote.

Delta and Kai did not perform this week due to Delta suffering a rib injury during the previous week's rehearsals. Under the show's rules, they were granted a bye to the following week. Delta was supposed to portray Olivia Newton-John as her icon and dance a cha-cha-cha to her song "Xanadu".

Couples are listed in the order they performed.

Couple	Scores	Dance	Music	Icon	Result
John & Katya	29 (6, 7, 8, 8)	Paso doble	"It's My Life"	Jon Bon Jovi	Safe
Dani & Nikita	25 (6, 6, 6, 7)	Rumba	"Hero"	Mariah Carey	Safe
Lawrence & Jowita	30 (7, 8, 7, 8)	Salsa	"La Copa de la Vida"	Ricky Martin	Safe
Tabby & Mark	29 (8, 7, 7, 7)	Samba	"Where Is My Husband!"	Raye	Safe
Sarah & Julian	21 (5, 5, 5, 6)	Tango	"That Don't Impress Me Much"	Shania Twain	Eliminated
Cach & Maddie	34 (8, 9, 8, 9)	Foxtrot	"New York, New York Theme"	Frank Sinatra	Safe
Bethany & Nancy	27 (6, 7, 7, 7)	Cha-cha-cha	"Respect"	Aretha Franklin	Bottom two
Shaun & Alexis	28 (7, 7, 7, 7)	Couple's choice	"I Got You (I Feel Good)" / "Get Up Offa That Thing"	James Brown	Safe
Lacey & Vito	29 (7, 7, 7, 8)	American Smooth	"Hometown Glory"	Adele	Safe
Graeme & Lauren	28 (7, 7, 7, 7)	Salsa	"Gimme! Gimme! Gimme!" / "Voulez-Vous"	ABBA	Safe
Jaime & Carlos	34 (8, 9, 8, 9)	Paso doble	"Let's Dance"	David Bowie	Safe
Will & Dianne	31 (7, 8, 8, 8)	Jive	"Crocodile Rock"	Elton John	Safe

Judges' votes to save

- Du Beke: Bethany & Nancy
- Revel Horwood: Bethany & Nancy
- Mabuse: Bethany & Nancy
- Ballas: Did not vote, but would have voted to save Bethany & Nancy.

=== Week 5 ===
- Musical guests: Melanie C — "Sweat", Jamie Miller & Antonio Cipriano — "Babydoll"

Each couple performed one unlearned dance. Anton Du Beke had the casting vote.

Couples are listed in the order they performed.

Couple	Scores	Dance	Music	Result
Jaime & Carlos	25 (6, 6, 6, 7)	Foxtrot	"Man I Need" — Olivia Dean	Bottom two
Lawrence & Jowita	19 (4, 5, 4, 6)	Jive	"The Rockafeller Skank" — Fatboy Slim	Safe
Graeme & Lauren	31 (7, 8, 7, 9)	Tango	"Hernando's Hideaway" — Alma Cogan	Safe
Will & Dianne	31 (7, 8, 8, 8)	Cha-cha-cha	"Daddy" — Della Reese	Safe
Bethany & Nancy	25 (5, 7, 6, 7)	Argentine tango	"All the Things She Said" — Harrison	Safe
Shaun & Alexis	17 (3, 5, 3, 6)	Jive	"Faith" — Stevie Wonder feat. Ariana Grande	Eliminated
Dani & Nikita	31 (7, 8, 8, 8)	Salsa	"Despechá" — Rosalía	Safe
Lacey & Vito	28 (7, 7, 6, 8)	Tango	"Atomic" — Blondie	Safe
Cach & Maddie	24 (5, 7, 5, 7)	Cha-cha-cha	"Beggin'" — Måneskin	Safe
Delta & Kai	34 (7, 9, 8, 10)	Rumba	"It's All Coming Back to Me Now" — Celine Dion	Safe
Tabby & Mark	37 (8, 10, 9, 10)	Couple's choice	"Stupid Song" — Olivia Rodrigo	Safe
John & Katya	32 (7, 8, 8, 9)	Quickstep	"5 Colours in Her Hair" — McFly	Safe

Judges' votes to save

- Revel Horwood: Jaime & Carlos
- Mabuse: Jaime & Carlos
- Ballas: Shaun & Alexis
- Du Beke: Jaime & Carlos

=== Week 6: Halloween Week ===
- Musical guests: Becky Hill — "Changes"

Each couple performed one unlearned dance to Halloween themes. Motsi Mabuse had the casting vote.

For the first time in Strictly's history, the results show featured a triple dance-off. The three couples with the lowest combined scores from the judges and public votes went head-to-head against one another, before the judges vote for the one couple that will be eliminated.

Couples are listed in the order they performed.

Couple	Scores	Dance	Music	Result
Graeme & Lauren	25 (6, 7, 5, 7)	Samba	"Coconut" — Harry Nilsson	Safe
Delta & Kai	33 (8, 8, 8, 9)	Viennese waltz	"Unchained Melody" — The Righteous Brothers	Safe
Tabby & Mark	25 (6, 7, 5, 7)	Quickstep	"Black Magic" — Little Mix	Safe
John & Katya	35 (8, 9, 9, 9)	Tango	"Dance..." — Slayyyter	Safe
Bethany & Nancy	30 (7, 8, 7, 8)	Jive	"I'm in Love with a Monster" — Fifth Harmony	Bottom three
Cach & Maddie	33 (7, 9, 8, 9)	Argentine tango	"Pas De Deux" — Michael Abels	Safe
Jaime & Carlos	27 (7, 7, 5, 8)	Salsa	"Filthy/Gorgeous" — Scissor Sisters	Bottom three
Will & Dianne	32 (8, 8, 8, 8)	Couple's choice	"Nu Flow" — Big Brovaz	Safe
Lawrence & Jowita	26 (6, 7, 6, 7)	Tango	"Ghostbusters" — Ray Parker Jr.	Eliminated
Dani & Nikita	32 (8, 8, 8, 8)	Viennese waltz	"My Favorite Things" — from The Sound of Music	Safe
Lacey & Vito	36 (9, 9, 9, 9)	Charleston	"Crazy Stupid Love" — Cheryl Cole feat. Tinie Tempah	Safe

Judges' votes to eliminate

- Ballas: Lawrence & Jowita
- Du Beke: Lawrence & Jowita
- Revel Horwood: Lawrence & Jowita
- Mabuse: Did not vote, but would have voted to eliminate Lawrence & Jowita.

=== Week 7 ===
- Musical guests: Gregory Porter — "Water Under Bridges"

Each couple performed one unlearned dance. Shirley Ballas had the casting vote.

Jaime and Carlos did not perform this week due to Jaime suffering from a torn abdominal muscle. Under the show's rules, they were granted a bye to the following week. They were slated to dance a Charleston to "I Can't Do It Alone" from Chicago, though they were able to perform the routine the following week.

Couples are listed in the order they performed.

Couple	Scores	Dance	Music	Result
Will & Dianne	29 (6, 8, 7, 8)	Quickstep	"This Love" — Maroon 5	Safe
Lacey & Vito	30 (6, 7, 8, 9)	Rumba	"Yellow" — Coldplay	Safe
Delta & Kai	31 (7, 8, 7, 9)	Cha-cha-cha	"Let's Get Loud" — Jennifer Lopez	Safe
Bethany & Nancy	30 (6, 9, 7, 8)	Foxtrot	"Bleeding Love" — Leona Lewis	Eliminated
John & Katya	26 (4, 7, 7, 8)	Salsa	"Get Lucky" — Daft Punk feat. Pharrell Williams	Safe
Graeme & Lauren	28 (5, 8, 7, 8)	Couple's choice	"The Book of Love" — Peter Gabriel	Safe
Tabby & Mark	33 (7, 9, 8, 9)	Paso doble	"Supermassive Black Hole" — Muse	Safe
Cach & Maddie	26 (4, 8, 6, 8)	Waltz	"That Ain't You" — Mulaa Joans	Bottom two
Dani & Nikita	36 (8, 10, 9, 9)	American Smooth	"It Had to Be You" — Harry Connick Jr.	Safe

Judges' votes to save

- Du Beke: Cach & Maddie
- Revel Horwood: Bethany & Nancy
- Mabuse: Bethany & Nancy
- Ballas: Cach & Maddie

=== Week 8 ===
- Musical guests: Bash Croft — "Everything Always Now"

Each couple performed one unlearned dance. Craig Revel Horwood had the casting vote.

Due to illness, Kai Widdrington was unable to perform during the live show. Aljaž Škorjanec filled in to dance with Delta Goodrem in his place.

Couples are listed in the order they performed.

Couple	Scores	Dance	Music	Result
Graeme & Lauren	27 (6, 7, 7, 7)	Quickstep	"Happy Days Theme" — Pratt & McClain	Safe
Dani & Nikita	30 (6, 8, 8, 8)	Paso doble	"Everybody Wants to Rule the World" — Tears for Fears	Safe
John & Katya	31 (7, 8, 8, 8)	Jive	"Pump It" — Black Eyed Peas	Safe
Tabby & Mark	30 (7, 8, 7, 8)	Viennese waltz	"I'm with You" — Avril Lavigne	Safe
Cach & Maddie	39 (9, 10, 10, 10)	Charleston	"Blame It on the Boogie" — The Jacksons	Safe
Delta & Aljaž	35 (9, 9, 8, 9)	Argentine tango	"Missing" — Everything but the Girl	Safe
Lacey & Vito	27 (6, 7, 7, 7)	Foxtrot	"Have You Met Miss Jones?" — Robbie Williams	Safe
Will & Dianne	27 (6, 7, 7, 7)	Paso doble	"Smalltown Boy" — Bronski Beat	Eliminated
Jaime & Carlos	33 (8, 8, 8, 9)	Charleston	"I Can't Do It Alone" — Catherine Zeta-Jones	Bottom two

Judges' votes to save

- Mabuse: Jaime & Carlos
- Ballas: Jaime & Carlos
- Du Beke: Will & Dianne
- Revel Horwood: Jaime & Carlos

=== Week 9: Blackpool Week ===
Musical Guests

- Saturday: Basement Jaxx ("Red Alert"/"Romeo"/"Where's Your Head At"/"Good Luck")
- Sunday: S Club ("S Club Party"/"Bring It All Back"/"Don't Stop Movin'"/"Reach")

Each couple performed one unlearned dance. This week's episode was staged in the Tower Ballroom at the Blackpool Tower in Blackpool, Lancashire. Motsi Mabuse had the casting vote.

Couples are listed in the order they performed.

Couple	Scores	Dance	Music	Result
Delta & Kai	36 (9, 9, 9, 9)	Quickstep	"I Wanna Be the Only One" — Eternal	Bottom two
Jaime & Carlos	32 (8, 8, 8, 8)	Samba	"Freedom! '90" — George Michael	Eliminated
Graeme & Lauren	32 (7, 8, 8, 9)	American Smooth	"I've Got the World on a String" — Michael Bublé	Safe
Dani & Nikita	35 (8, 9, 9, 9)	Couple's choice	"Love Sex Magic" — Ciara feat. Justin Timberlake	Safe
Tabby & Mark	39 (9, 10, 10, 10)	Charleston	"Another Day of Sun" — from La La Land	Safe
John & Katya	39 (9, 10, 10, 10)	Viennese waltz	"Hallelujah" — k.d. lang	Safe
Lacey & Vito	35 (8, 9, 9, 9)	Paso doble	"Survivor" — 2WEI	Safe
Cach & Maddie	39 (9, 10, 10, 10)	Jive	"Mambo No. 5 (A Little Bit Of...)" — Lou Bega	Safe

Judges' votes to save

- Ballas: Delta & Kai
- Du Beke: Delta & Kai
- Revel Horwood: Delta & Kai
- Mabuse: Did not vote, but would have voted to save Delta & Kai.

=== Week 10 ===
Each couple performed one unlearned and one instant dance.

Couples are listed in the order they performed.

Couple	Scores	Dance	Music	Result
Cach & Maddie				
Dani & Nikita				
Delta & Kai				
Graeme & Lauren				
John & Katya		American Smooth	"Sweet Caroline" — Neil Diamond	
Lacey & Vito				
Tabby & Mark		Rumba	"Die on This Hill" — Sienna Spiro	

== Dance chart ==
The couples performed the following each week:

- Week 1–9: One unlearned dance
- Week 10: One unlearned dance and one instant dance (previously learned style)

Strictly Come Dancing series 24 - Dance chart
Couple	Week												
Couple	1	2	3	4	5	6	7	8	9	10 (Note: The second listed dance is the couple's instant dance, revealed immediately prior to their performance.)	11	12	13
Cach & Maddie	Quickstep	Samba	Couple's choice	Foxtrot	Cha-cha-cha	Argentine tango	Waltz	Charleston	Jive				
Dani & Nikita	Samba	Foxtrot	Tango	Rumba	Salsa	Viennese waltz	American Smooth	Paso doble	Couple's choice				
Delta & Kai	Samba	American Smooth	Salsa	~~Cha-cha-cha~~ (Note: This couple were excused from competition due to illness or injury, and were granted a bye to the following week.)	Rumba	Viennese waltz	Cha-cha-cha	Argentine tango	Quickstep				
Graeme & Lauren	Cha-cha-cha	Waltz	Jive	Salsa	Tango	Samba	Couple's choice	Quickstep	American Smooth				
John & Katya	Foxtrot	Couple's choice	Cha-cha-cha	Paso doble	Quickstep	Tango	Salsa	Jive	Viennese waltz	American Smooth			
Lacey & Vito	Cha-cha-cha	Quickstep	Samba	American Smooth	Tango	Charleston	Rumba	Foxtrot	Paso doble				
Tabby & Mark	Jive	American Smooth	Argentine tango	Samba	Couple's choice	Quickstep	Paso doble	Viennese waltz	Charleston	Rumba			
Jaime & Carlos	Tango	Cha-cha-cha	Viennese waltz	Paso doble	Foxtrot	Salsa	~~Charleston~~	Charleston	Samba				
Will & Dianne	Samba	Foxtrot	Waltz	Jive	Cha-cha-cha	Couple's choice	Quickstep	Paso doble					
Bethany & Nancy	Quickstep	Paso doble	American Smooth	Cha-cha-cha	Argentine tango	Jive	Foxtrot						
Lawrence & Jowita	Paso doble	Viennese waltz	Rumba	Salsa	Jive	Tango							
Shaun & Alexis	Cha-cha-cha	Salsa	Quickstep	Couple's choice	Jive								
Sarah & Julian	Quickstep	Charleston	Paso doble	Tango									
Melanie & Aljaž	Cha-cha-cha	Waltz	Charleston										
Chris & Amy	Tango	Cha-cha-cha											

== Ratings ==
Weekly ratings for each show on BBC One. All ratings are provided by BARB.

Episode	Date	Official rating (millions)	Weekly rank for BBC One	Weekly rank for all UK TV
Launch show	19 September	6.43	1	1
Week 1	26 September	6.20	1	2
Week 2	3 October	6.27	3	5
Week 2 results	4 October	5.18	4	7
Week 3	10 October	5.81	3	5
Week 3 results	11 October	5.43	4	6
Week 4	17 October	6.04	3	4
Week 4 results	18 October	5.47	4	5
Week 5	24 October	6.15	3	4
Week 5 results	25 October	5.44	6	7
Week 6	31 October	6.16	6	7
Week 6 results	1 November	5.63	9	10
Week 7	7 November			
Week 7 results	8 November			
Week 8	14 November			
Week 8 results	15 November			
Week 9	21 November			
Week 9 results	22 November			
Week 10	28 November			
Week 10 results	29 November			
Week 11	5 December			
Week 11 results	6 December			
Week 12	12 December			
Week 12 results	13 December			
Week 13	19 December			
