= Somnium =

Somnium was originally a Latin word meaning "dream", and may refer to:

- Somnium (novel), a scientific fantasy in Latin by Johannes Kepler
- Somnium, a brand name for the drug lorazepam
- Somnium (album) a 7-hour album by the ambient musician Robert Rich
- Somnium, an album by SIANspheric
- Teemu Raimoranta, nickname Somnium, a former guitarist from the bands Finntroll and Impaled Nazarene
- Somnium (video game), also known as NesRom, a downloadable video game for the Nintendo DSi's DSiWare service
- Somnium, a fictional card game from the Civilization IV: Beyond the Sword mod Fall From Heaven
- Somnium: A Dancer's Dream, a 2019 dance show directed by Neil Jones
- Somnium, a 2024 scifi thriller directed by Racheal Cain and starring Chloe Levine

== See also ==
- AI: The Somnium Files, an adventure video game
