= Chris Appleton =

English hairstylist (born 1983)

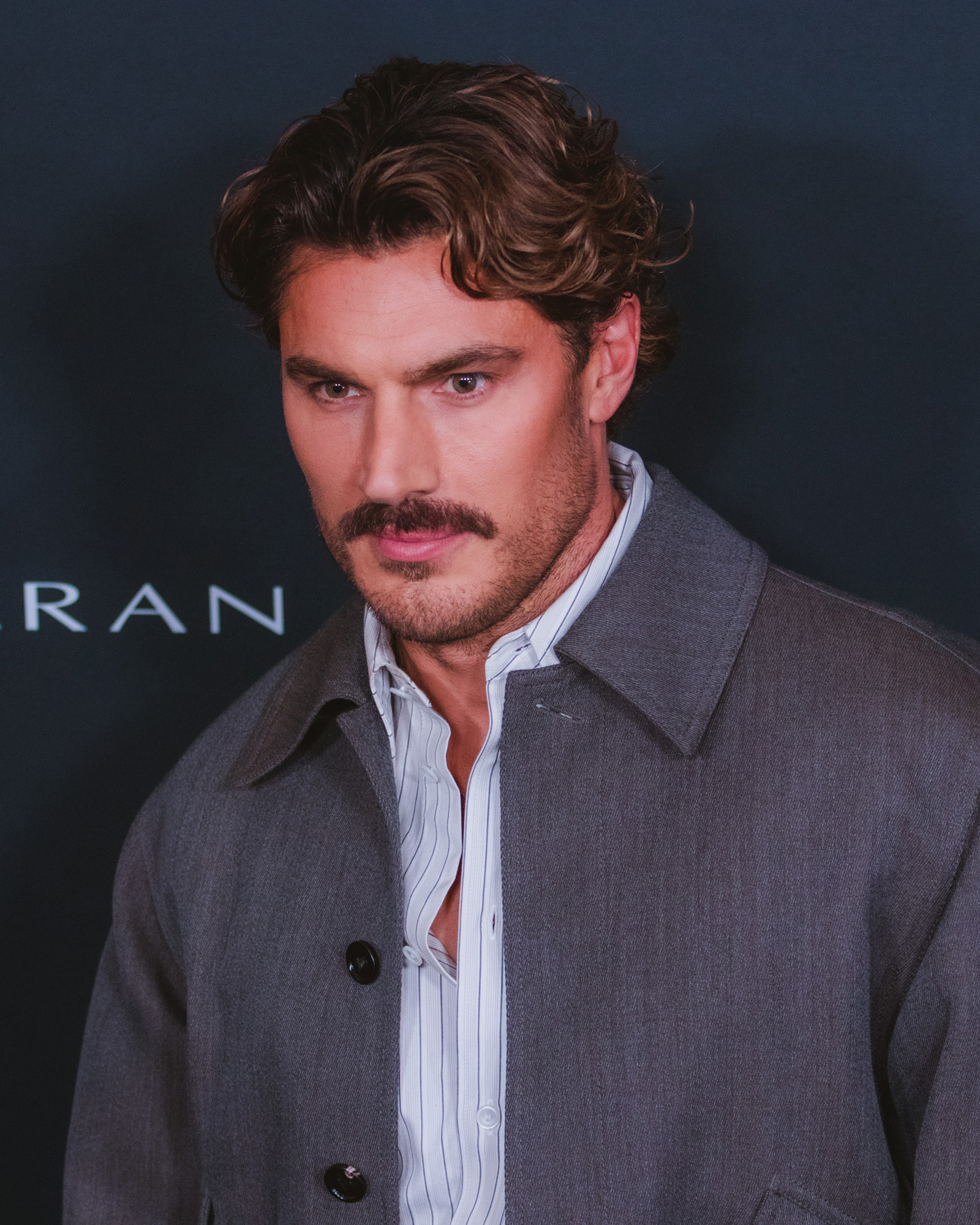
- Appleton in 2026
- Born: Christopher David Appleton; 14 June 1983 (age 43); Leicester, England
- Occupation: Hairstylist
- Years active: 1996–present
- Television: The Kardashians; Strictly Come Dancing
- Spouse: Lukas Gage (m. 2023; div. 2024)
- Children: 2

Christopher David Appleton (born 14 June 1983) is an English hairstylist. Known for his extensive celebrity clientele, his work has appeared in various publications including Vogue, Harper's Bazaar, Vanity Fair, Marie Claire, Grazia and L'Officiel. He has made several appearances on The Kardashians and The Drew Barrymore Show and appeared as a contestant on the twenty-fourth series of Strictly Come Dancing in 2026.

== Early life ==
Christopher David Appleton was born on 14 June 1983 in Leicester, England, the third of five children born to Jane (née Twigger) and David Appleton. Appleton would style his mother's hair as a child, which ignited his interest in working as a hairstylist.

== Career ==
Appleton began working at a hair salon in his hometown as a teenager in 1996, regularly commuting to London during his time off, where he would assist artists on set, take classes and subsequently earned a degree in hair colouring. His first celebrity client was singer Rita Ora, who after their first appointment, booked Appleton for numerous campaigns, red carpet events and her tour. He went on to amass a number of celebrity clientele including Kim Kardashian and other members of the Kardashian family, which has seen him make several appearances on their reality series The Kardashians, as well as Britney Spears, Jennifer Lopez, Sofía Vergara, Katy Perry and Ariana Grande, conceptualising the latter's iconic "ponytail" hairdo. He has also made several appearances on The Drew Barrymore Show and Today.

In January 2026, Appleton released his debut memoir, Your Roots Don't Define You, the foreword of which was written by Kris Jenner and subsequently appeared in The New York Times Best Seller list. In June 2026, Appleton was announced as a contestant on the twenty-fourth series of the BBC competition Strictly Come Dancing. On joining the show, Appleton said he was "thrilled to be joining [the show] and coming home to the UK for this incredible experience." adding that he "always believed that the best things happen when you take a chance and try something new. I may know my way around a salon floor, but the dance floor is a whole different story – and I can’t wait to get started." He was paired with Amy Dowden and they were the first couple to be eliminated from the series after losing the dance-off to Jaime Winstone and Carlos Gu.

== Personal life ==
Appleton was in a relationship with Katie Katon, who he met as a teenager, for nine years, and they had two children together, a son, Billy born in 2002, and a daughter, Kitty-Blu born in 2004. Appleton later came out as gay in his twenties. Between 2023 and 2024, Appleton was married to actor Lukas Gage. Their marriage was filmed for an episode of The Kardashians. Appleton is dyslexic.

== Filmography ==
As himself
Year	Title	Notes	Ref.
2014	House of Style	1 episode	
2017	The Doctors	1 episode	
2018	Rachael Ray	1 episode	
2018–2020	The Wendy Williams Show	3 episodes	
2019–present	Today	Recurring role	
2019	E! Live from the Red Carpet	1 episode	
2020	Entertainment Tonight	1 episode	
2020	MTV Prom-athon	1 episode	
2020–2021	GMA3	2 episodes	
2021	Jennifer Lopez: Halftime	Documentary	
2021–present	The Drew Barrymore Show	Recurring role	
2022–present	The Kardashians	Recurring role	
2022–2024	The Craig Caddell Show	4 episodes	
2023, 2026	Access Hollywood	2 episodes	
2024	Live from the Other Side with Tyler Henry	Documentary	
2025	Selling Sunset	Episode: "There's No Going Back"	
2026	Tamron Hall	1 episode	
2026	Strictly Come Dancing	Contestant; series 24	

== Bibliography ==
- Your Roots Don't Define You (2026)
