= Graeme Hall (dog trainer) =

English dog trainer (born 1966)

- Born: 27 November 1966 (age 59); Selby, North Yorkshire, England
- Education: University of Hull
- Occupation: Dog trainer
- Known for: Dogs Behaving (Very) Badly
- Spouse: Elinor Perry-Hall (m. 2017; sep. 2023)

Graeme Hall (born 27 November 1966), also known as The Dog Father is an English dog trainer, podcaster, and author. He is best known for fronting the Channel 5 series Dogs Behaving (Very) Badly since 2017.

== Early life ==
Graeme Hall was born on 27 November 1966 in Selby, Yorkshire. He studied at the University of Hull between 1983 and 1987. He was a shift manager at Weetabix before moving into a management consultant role at Weetabix Limited in Northamptonshire for 21 years, taking redundancy in 2007.

== Career ==
In 2008, Hall set up his own dog training business. In 2017, he appeared in a one-off special Dogs Behaving Badly on Channel 4, which was later established into a full series Dogs Behaving (Very) Badly, that has aired on Channel 5 since 2019. He has also fronted The Dog Hospital with Graeme Hall on the same channel. The former also airs on CBC Television in Canada. Hall is a Master Dog Trainer and a member of the Guild Of Dog Trainers.

In 2022, Hall began writing a regular column for The Times. He has also hosted a podcast, Talking Dogs, and appeared on Celebrity Mastermind, The Chase: Celebrity Special and Christmas University Challenge. In 2023, he began fronting the Australian version of Dogs Behaving (Very) Badly, which premiered in July of that year on Network 10.

In August 2026, Hall was announced as a contestant on the twenty-fourth series of Strictly Come Dancing. His professional dance partner is Lauren Oakley.

== Personal life ==
Hall married accountant Elinor Perry-Hall in 2017 in Sri Lanka, before they separated. Hall now resides in Oxfordshire with his partner Nicola Worth.

== Filmography ==
As himself
Year	Title	Notes	Ref.
2017	Dogs Behaving Badly	Dog trainer	
2019–present	Dogs Behaving (Very) Badly	Dog trainer	
2020–2022	Jeremy Vine	Guest; 6 episodes	
2022	Celebrity Mastermind	Contestant; 1 episode	
2022	Christmas University Challenge	Contestant; 3 episodes	
2023–2025	Dogs Behaving (Very) Badly Australia	Dog trainer	
2023	The Chase: Celebrity Special	Contestant; 1 episode	
2023	Dog Hospital with Graeme Hall	Dog trainer	
2025	All Creatures Great and Small: Behind the Magic	Guest; 1 episode	
2026	Vanessa	Guest; 1 episode	
2026	Strictly Come Dancing	Contestant; series 24	

== Bibliography ==
- Hall, Graeme (2024-07-04). The Ultimate Kids’ Guide to Dogs: Everything you need to know to be a dog’s best friend. Random House. ISBN 978-0-241-63838-5.
- Hall, Graeme (2024-02-01). Does My Dog Love Me?: Understanding how your dog sees the world. Random House. ISBN 978-1-5291-9208-7.
- All Dogs Great and Small (Penguin Books, 2021) ISBN 978-1529107449
- Perfectly Imperfect Puppy (Random House, 2022) ISBN 978-1529149210
