= Matilda the Musical (soundtrack) =

Roald Dahl's Matilda the Musical (Soundtrack from the Netflix Film)

Soundtrack album by various artists
- Released: 18 November 2022
- Recorded: Abbey Road Studios; AIR Studios
- Genres: Film soundtrack; musical
- Length: 65:47
- Label: Milan
- Producers: Tim Minchin; Christopher Nightingale

Singles from Roald Dahl's Matilda the Musical (Soundtrack from the Netflix Film)
- 1. "Revolting Children" Released: 11 November 2022

Roald Dahl's Matilda the Musical (Soundtrack from the Netflix Film) is the soundtrack to the 2022 film Roald Dahl's Matilda the Musical, which is based on the stage musical of the same name. It was released by Milan Records digitally on 18 November 2022 with a physical CD release following on 9 December 2022. The album featured 22 tracks, including songs from the stage musical as well as a new closing number written by Tim Minchin, and the incidental underscore composed by Christopher Nightingale.

== Background ==
In November 2013, when the film adaptation of Matilda the Musical was reported to be under production, Tim Minchin who previously wrote songs for the musical, was in talks to write new songs for the film. His involvement was officially confirmed in January 2020. Christopher Nightingale, who worked as the orchestrator and music supervisor on the stage production, had underscored the incidental music, while Becky Berntham served as the film's music supervisor. Nightingale said "The diversity of the songs is gloriously far-reaching, and my first job in writing the original score was to try and build a framework that might bind things together; find, create and extend common ground."

The soundtrack list to Matilda the Musical was released by Sony Masterworks and Netflix Music on 4 November 2022. The album featured much of the songs featured in the stage musical as well as a new closing number written for the film, that kept undisclosed (later titled "Still Holding My Hand"). The song was performed by Alisha Weir and Lashana Lynch at the Netflix Playlist—a virtual music showcase event. Minchin, who wrote the closing track, said, "The movie really called for an ending number, because films don't have curtain calls. So it needed to be wrapped up. It needed all the thematic and musical traits to be tied with a nice bow." Nine tracks from Nightingale's instrumental compositions he underscored, also accompany the album.

The album was released on 18 November 2022 through digital music streaming providers and was released on CD on 9 December. Prior to the official release, the track "Revolting Children" was released as a single on 11 November.

== Reception ==
Writing for BroadwayWorld, Bobby Patrick said "Minchen & Co have adapted the score to suit the film medium, the cast has made good meals of their singing assignments, and the additional instrumental scoring by Nightengale is, quite frankly, gorgeous. Most everything is in exciting minor keys, throughout, that give the requisite drama overall, and there are treats to be heard. Is it the Broadway show? No, but it's not supposed to be, cuz it's a 'movie'! In all, this album is a fine adaptation of the familiar and we enjoyed most of it, and can forgive the cuts made between mediums." Ian Bowkett of Musical Theatre Review said "With this album in your headphones, you will find yourself striding determinedly around the streets, ready to cause trouble and fight against the world's many injustices. Until a number like ‘When I Grow Up’ or ‘My House’ makes you cry like a child."

== Track listing ==
Roald Dahl's Matilda the Musical (Soundtrack from the Netflix Film) track listing
No.	Title	Artist(s)	Length
1.	"Miracle"	Matt Henry; Alisha Weir; Stephen Graham; Andrea Riseborough; The Cast of Roald Dahl's Matilda the Musical	5:09
2.	"Naughty"	Weir	3:08
3.	"The Acrobat and the Escapologist"	Christopher Nightingale; Tim Minchin	2:14
4.	"School Song"	Meesha Garbett; Sadie Victoria Lim; Cast	3:21
5.	"The Hammer"	Emma Thompson; Lashana Lynch; Cast	3:23
6.	"Chokey Chant – Hide Me"	Nightingale; Garbett; Cast	1:25
7.	"And So the Great Day Arrived"	Nightingale	3:03
8.	"The Biggest Burp"	Nightingale	0:44
9.	"Bruce"	Cast	2:41
10.	"When I Grow Up"	Rei Yamauchi Fulker; Andrei Shen; Winter Jarrett Glasspool; Ashton Robertson; Lynch; Weir; Cast	3:42
11.	"The Most Dangerous Feat"	Nightingale	3:55
12.	"I'm Here"	Weir; Carl Spencer	3:43
13.	"The Smell of Rebellion"	Thompson; Cast	4:42
14.	"The Newt – Stretchy Ears"	Nightingale	1:14
15.	"Quiet"	Weir	3:58
16.	"Telekinesis"	Nightingale	0:48
17.	"My House"	Lynch; Spencer	3:25
18.	"The Truth – Chokey Destruction"	Nightingale	2:09
19.	"Day of Reckoning"	Nightingale	1:58
20.	"Magnus Returns"	Nightingale	3:52
21.	"Revolting Children"	Charlie Hodson-Prior; Garbett; Liberty Greig; Cast	2:54
22.	"Still Holding My Hand"	Lynch; Weir; Cast	4:19
Total length:			65:47

== Personnel ==
- Score composer: Chris Nightingale
- Score engineer: Rupert Coulson, Alex Ferguson
- Score editor: Chris Barrett
- Mixing: Rupert Coulson
- Digital recordist: Alex Ferguson
- Assistant engineers: Ashley Andrew-Jones, Rebecca Hordern, Jedidiah Rimell
- Orchestra: Isobel Griffiths Ltd.
- Orchestration: Andrew Dudman, Neil Dawes

== Charts ==
Weekly chart performance for Roald Dahl's Matilda the Musical (Soundtrack from the Netflix Film)
Chart (2022–2023)	Peak position
Australian Albums (ARIA)	99
UK Compilation Albums (Official Charts)	2
UK Soundtrack Albums (Official Charts)	1

== Release history ==
Release dates and formats for Roald Dahl's Matilda the Musical (Soundtrack from the Netflix Film)
Region	Language	Date	Format(s)	Label	Ref.
Various	English	18 November 2022	Digital download; streaming	Netflix Music; Sony Masterworks	
Various	English	9 December 2022	CD	Netflix Music; Sony Masterworks	
