= Lawrence Robb =

Scottish actor (born 1991)

- Born: 7 November 1991 (age 34); Glasgow, Scotland
- Education: Dance School of Scotland
- Occupation: Actor
- Years active: 2014–present

Lawrence Robb (born 7 November 1991) is a Scottish actor, known for portraying Mackenzie Boyd in the ITV soap opera Emmerdale since 2020. He appeared as a contestant on the twenty-fourth series of Strictly Come Dancing in 2026.

== Life and career ==
Robb was born on 7 November 1991 in Glasgow, Scotland, to parents Iain and Claire, and was raised in Kilmacolm. He studied at St Columba's School and later the Royal Conservatoire of Scotland. Whilst at school, he played rugby and was also a choirboy, as well as acting in a Christmas pantomime aged 14. He subsequently attended the Dance School of Scotland in Knightswood. Robb is also a singer, and has posted several covers of songs on social media. He later moved to London, and in 2014, appeared as John in the short film The Trouble Downstairs. In August 2020, he appeared in an episode of the Sky Atlantic series I Hate Suzie, portraying the role of Matt. He has also appeared in several stage productions including Into the Woods, Mojo and Legally Blonde.

In 2020, Robb joined the cast of the ITV soap opera Emmerdale as Mackenzie Boyd. He was introduced as the brother of established character Moira Dingle (Natalie J. Robb). Since joining the soap, his storylines have included a marriage to Charity Dingle (Emma Atkins) and being kidnapped by John Sugden (Oliver Farnworth). He also appeared in the crossover spin-off Corriedale in 2026.

In August 2026, Robb was announced as a contestant on the twenty-fourth series of Strictly Come Dancing. On joining the show, Robb said: "I don't know who's more excited about this, me or my mother. I can't quite believe that I am going to be getting my dancing shoes on this September on one of my favourite shows of all time! It's a dream come true, and I can't wait to bring my all to ballroom. Wish me luck, and any advice is very welcome - trust me I'll need it!".. He was the fifth celebrity to be eliminated in the competition, in the Halloween-themed week.

== Filmography ==
Year	Title	Role	Notes	Ref.
2014	The Trouble Downstairs	John	Main role	
2020	I Hate Suzie	Matt	Episode: "Bargaining"	
2020–present	Emmerdale	Mackenzie Boyd	Regular role	
2026	Corriedale	Mackenzie Boyd	Spin-off	
2026	Strictly Come Dancing	Himself	Contestant; series 24	

== Stage ==
Title	Role	Ref.
Disappeared	Jack	
Little Johnny's Big Gay Wedding	Singing Walter	
War of the Worlds	Various	
The Laramie Project	Various	
Swinging Into Christmas	Lead Vocalist	
Watertight	Nathan	
Into the Woods	Rapunzel's Prince	
Mojo	Understudy Silver Johnny	
Tommy	Lover / Minister	
Cinderella	Prince	
Legally Blonde	Aaron / Kyle	
