= Lethabo Monametsi =

South African dancer and choreographer (born 2003)

- Born: 1 June 2003 (age 23); South Africa
- Occupations: Dancer; choreographer
- Known for: Dance Yo Dumo; Strictly Come Dancing

Lethabo Monametsi (born 1 June 2003) is a South African dancer and choreographer. She won the South African competition Dance Yo Dumo as a member of the dance collective Urban Wave in 2022, and has appeared as a professional dancer on the BBC competition series Strictly Come Dancing since 2026.

== Life and career ==
Monametsi was born on 1 June 2003 in South Africa. Monametsi has represented South Africa at the WDC Amateur Open World Championships in Ireland. Outside of dancing, she achieved a Bachelor of Arts (Law Major) degree from the University of the Witwatersrand. In 2022, she won the South African dance competition Dance Yo Dumo as part of the dance collective Urban Wave. She also appeared as a dancer on the South African version of The Masked Singer.

In July 2026, Monametsi was announced to be joining the twenty-fourth series of the British version of Strictly Come Dancing as a professional dancer, alongside Maddie Ingoldsby, Mark Karmalita, Aleksandra Isaeva and Cristian Priori. On joining the show, Monametsi said: "This moment is bigger than me. I step into it with profound gratitude and deep humility, knowing it is the culmination of years of unwavering love, belief, and support from the people who dared to dream alongside me. Representing South Africa on the Strictly Come Dancing stage is far more than a career milestone, it is an honour beyond words, and I cannot wait to embrace every extraordinary moment of this journey."

=== Strictly Come Dancing Christmas Special ===
Monametsi danced with Lewis Cope for the 2026 Strictly Come Dancing Christmas Special.
