= Somnium: A Dancer's Dream =

Somnium: A Dancer's Dream was a dance show directed and choreographed by Neil Jones. The show tells the life story of Neil Jones and Katya Jones beginning with their respective childhoods, moving through to the moment they first met and finally to how together they became World Latin Showdance Champions. The show was performed at Sadler's Wells Theatre in 2019.

== Synopsis ==
The show moves briefly through the lives of the couple's parents, the birth of Neil and Katya in the north of England and St Petersburg respectively, and their first meeting at Blackpool Tower Ballroom. It then covers an accelerated journey of their dating while competing to their eventual win of the World Latin Showdance Championships.

The show's choreography incorporates many dance styles including contemporary, commercial and hip-hop as well as Ballroom, Jive and Latin. It also features popular dances such as the floss.

== Production history ==
The show was originally created for the Lichfield Festival before being reworked for the London run.

It marked the first time a predominantly Latin and Ballroom show had been performed at Sadler's Wells Theatre, as well as the first time any of the Strictly Come Dancing professionals had performed their own show at the venue.

The show was produced by The Joneses’ Ltd. with direction & choreography by Neil Jones, and costume design & musical arrangements by Katya Jones. Lighting design was by Elliot Griggs with set design by Mick Hurd. Ian Banham was the assistant to the director and choreographer. General management was by Mildred Yuan with Charlotte Edwards as production assistant. Production management was by Digby Robinson with Harry Blumenau Casting as the Children's Administrator. The 2nd Assistants to the director were Nicole Romasz and, for the children's cast, Emily Charlton.

== Cast ==
- Neil Jones
- Katya Jones
- Charles Venn as Richard Porter (Katya & Neil's coach & mentor)
- Chris Arias
- Renato Barros Nobre
- Jeremy Basile
- Kate Basile
- Ellie Beacock
- Michael Danilczuk
- Kerri Ann Donaldson
- Domenico Palmisano
- Luke Miller
- Jowita Przystał
- Korina Travis
- Jasmine Ambrose-Brown
- Neath Champion-Weeks
- Millie Collyer
- Alexandra Cook
- Rebecca Hastings
- Lori Hopkinson
- Lauren Howse
- Sophie Hurley
- Maddy Lee
- Beatrice Little
- Jessica Maynard
- Lottie-Rose Netherwood
- Lizzie Tsareva
- Rosie Winter
- Stalo Zachariou
- Students of The Vale School Of Dance
- Students of Allstarz Academy & Dance Connection (on alternating nights)

== Reviews ==
The show received mostly positive reviews that praised the cast and the quality of the dance numbers. The plot and story arc received mixed reviews
