= Mark Karmalita =

Canadian dancer and choreographer (born 2003)

- Born: September 18, 2003 (age 23); Toronto, Canada
- Occupations: Dancer; choreographer
- Known for: Strictly Come Dancing

Mark Karmalita (born September 18, 2003) is a Canadian dancer and choreographer, known for appearing as a professional dancer on the British TV dancing competition series Strictly Come Dancing, the originator of the global Dancing with the Stars franchise, since 2026.

== Life and career ==
Karmalita was born on September 18, 2003, in Toronto, Canada. He is a two-time National Latin Champion in Canada, as well as a Canadian Championship winner and finalist across multiple age group dance categories. Karmalita is also an Empire Dance US Latin Rising Star Champion and was previously ranked 10th in the World at the Under 21 Latin Dance Festival in Blackpool.

In July 2026, Karmalita was announced to be joining the twenty-fourth season of Strictly Come Dancing, as a professional dancer, alongside fellow newcomers Aleksandra Isaeva, Maddie Ingoldsby, Lethabo Monametsi and Cristian Priori. Following the announcement, Karmalita said: "Joining Strictly feels incredibly special, and I'm honoured to be stepping into a ballroom with so much history and heart. I can't wait to bring my own style, connect with the audience, and enjoy every moment along the way. He was later paired with skeleton racer Tabby Stoecker for the series.

Series	Partner	Place	Average Score
24	Tabby Stoecker		30.4

==== Series 24 ====
Celebrity partner:Tabby Stoecker

Week	Dance	Music	Judges' scores (Note: Individual judges' scores are listed in the following order: Craig Revel Horwood, Motsi Mabuse, Shirley Ballas, Anton Du Beke.)				Total score	Result
1	Jive	"Animal"	4	6	5	7	22	No Elimination
2	American Smooth	"Rewrite the Stars"	7	7	7	7	28	Safe
3	Argentine tango	"Hate That I Made You Love Me"	8	8	7	8	31	Safe
4	Samba	"Where Is My Husband"	8	7	7	7	29	Safe
5	Couple's choice	"Stupid Song"	8	10	9	10	37	Safe
6	Quickstep	"Black Magic"	6	7	5	7	25	Safe
7	Paso doble	"Supermassive Black Hole"	7	9	8	9	33	Safe
8	Viennese waltz	"I'm With You"	7	8	7	8	30	Safe
9	Charleston	"Another Day of Sun / Walking on Sunshine"	9	10	10	10	39	Safe
10								
