= Katya Jones =

Russian dancer (born 1989)

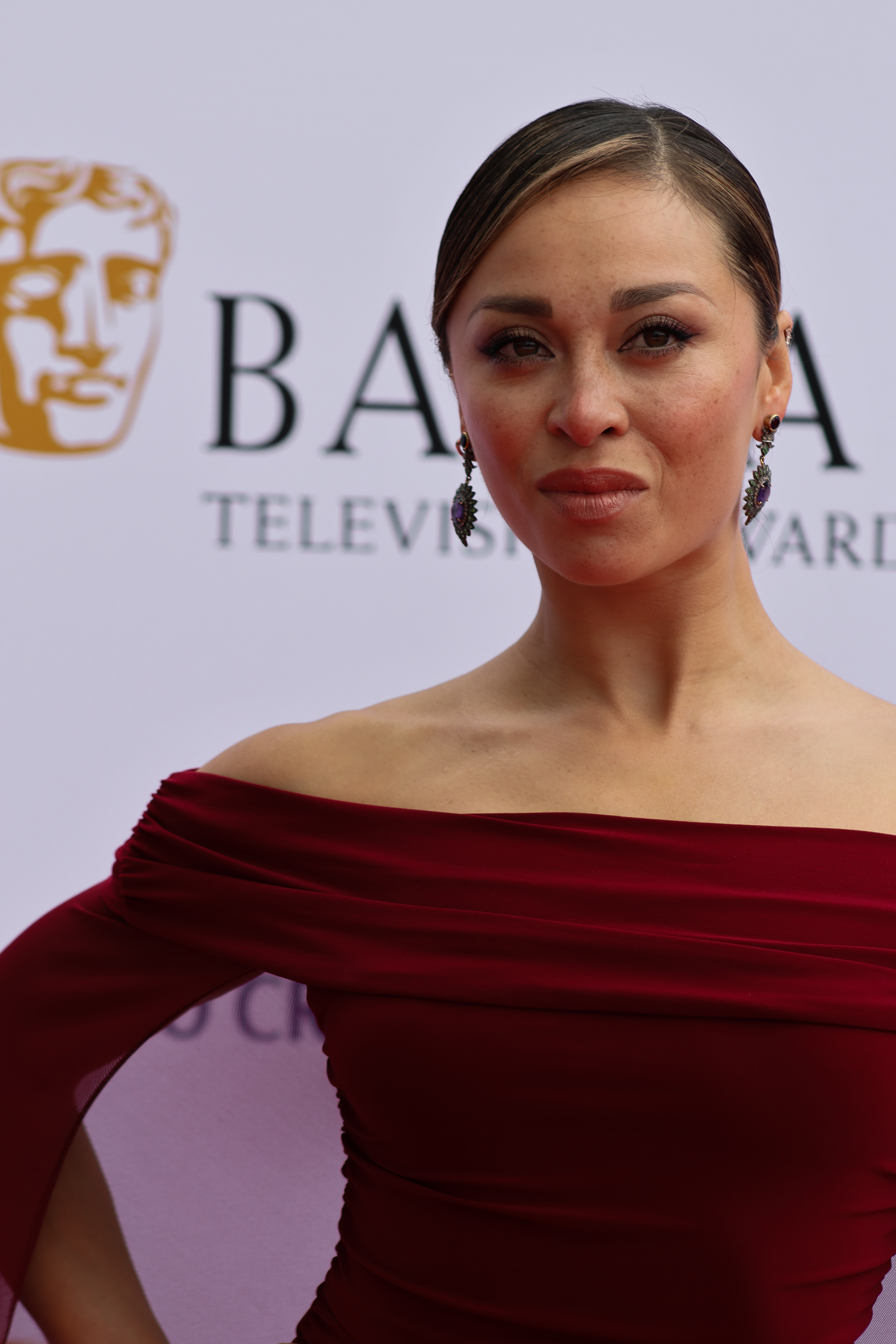
- Jones in 2026
- Born: Ekaterina Andreevna Sokolova; 12 May 1989 (age 37); St Petersburg, Russian SFSR, Soviet Union
- Occupations: Dancer, choreographer
- Spouse: Neil Jones (m. 2013; div. 2019)

Katya Jones (born Ekaterina Andreevna Sokolova; Russian: Екатерина Андреевна Соколова; 12 May 1989) is a Russian dancer and choreographer. She is best known for being a professional dancer in the competition show Strictly Come Dancing, which she won in 2017 with her dance partner Joe McFadden. In the 2020 series, Jones was paired with the retired professional and Olympic champion boxer Nicola Adams, the first same-sex couple to compete in the UK competition's format.

Between August 2013 and August 2019, she was married to Neil Jones, a dancer and fellow cast member of Strictly Come Dancing.

== Early life ==
She was born in Sestroretsk, near Leningrad, Soviet Union, and started dancing at the age of six, training in gymnastics as well as Ballroom and Latin-American dancing. Her father is Russian and a senior oil company executive and her Korean mother is a graduate in engineering.

== Strictly Come Dancing ==
In 2016, Jones became a professional in the BBC ballroom dancing show Strictly Come Dancing for its 14th series. Jones was partnered with the former Shadow chancellor, Ed Balls. For the 15th series, Jones partnered the Holby City actor, Joe McFadden, where they were the series winners. For the 16th series, Jones partnered the comedian Seann Walsh and for the 17th series, she was partnered with the BBC sports presenter, Mike Bushell.

In the 18th series, Jones was part of the show's first same-sex couple, with the professional boxer Nicola Adams. They withdrew from the competition on 12 November, after Jones tested positive for COVID-19. She was partnered with the Olympic swimmer Adam Peaty for the 19th series. For series 20 she was partnered with former England footballer and manager Tony Adams. They withdrew during the week 8 results show due to Tony sustaining a hamstring injury during his original performance.

=== Highest and lowest scoring performances per dance ===
Dance	Partner	Highest score	Partner	Lowest score
American Smooth	Joe McFadden	35	Mike Bushell	14
Argentine Tango	Joe McFadden	35	Adam Peaty	32
Cha-Cha-Cha	Lewis Cope	35	Mike Bushell	18
Charleston	Joe McFadden; Lewis Cope	40	Tony Adams	22
Couple's Choice	Lewis Cope	40	John Nellis	23
Dance-a-thon	Joe McFadden	6	Ed Balls	1
Foxtrot	Lewis Cope	34	Nigel Harman	29
Instant Dance	Lewis Cope	6		
Jive	John Nellis	31	Seann Walsh	15
Paso Doble	Lewis Cope	37	Ed Balls	16
Quickstep	Joe McFadden	38	Adam Peaty	19
Rumba	Lewis Cope	36	Adam Peaty	20
Salsa	Lewis Cope	35	Tony Adams	21
Samba	Joe McFadden	37	Tony Adams	18
Showdance	Joe McFadden	39		
Tango	Lewis Cope	37	Tony Adams	15
Viennese Waltz	Joe McFadden John Nellis	39	Seann Walsh	20
Waltz	Ed Balls	21		

Wynne Evans is the only celebrity not to appear on this list.

Series	Partner	Place	Average score
14	Ed Balls	6th	22.6
15	Joe McFadden	1st	33.8
16	Seann Walsh	11th	22.5
17	Mike Bushell	8th	23.5
18	Nicola Adams	10th	28.3
19	Adam Peaty	9th	26.6
20	Tony Adams	9th	22.0
21	Nigel Harman	5th	30.7
22	Wynne Evans	8th	30.8
23	Lewis Cope	5th	34.8
24	John Nellis		25.8

Colour key:

Winners
Runners-up
Withdrew

=== Ed Balls ===
She partnered the politician Ed Balls for the 14th series of Strictly Come Dancing.

Week #	Dance / song	Judges' score				Total	Result
Week #	Dance / song	Horwood	Bussell	Goodman	Tonioli	Total	Result
1	Waltz / "Are You Lonesome Tonight"	5	5	6	5	21	No elimination
2	Charleston / "The Banjo's Back in Town"	3	7	6	7	23	Safe
3	Samba / Cuban Pete song from "The Mask"	4	6	7	7	24	Safe
4	Paso doble / "Holding Out for a Hero"	2	5	5	4	16	Safe
5	American Smooth / "Is This the Way to Amarillo"	2	6	6	4	18	Safe
6	Cha-cha-cha / "Love Potion No. 9"	4	7	7	8	26	Safe
7	Quickstep / "Help!"	6	7	7	7	27	Safe
8	Salsa / "Gangnam Style"	4	7	8	6	25	Safe
9	Jive / "Great Balls of Fire"	4	6	7	6	23	Safe
10	Tango / "(I Can't Get No) Satisfaction"; Cha-cha-cha Challenge / "I Like It Like That"	4	6	7	6	24 (Note: Awarded 1 extra point.)	Eliminated

- Red number indicates Ed and Katya were at the bottom of the leaderboard.

=== Joe McFadden ===
She partnered actor Joe McFadden for the 15th series of Strictly Come Dancing.

Week #	Dance / Song	Judges' score				Total	Result
Week #	Dance / Song	Horwood	Bussell	Ballas	Tonioli	Total	Result
1	Jive / "Rockin' Robin"	7	7	8	7	29	No Elimination
2	Tango / "Castle on the Hill"	5	6	5	6	22	Safe
3	Viennese waltz / "Somewhere My Love"	8	8	8	8	32	Safe
4	Cha-cha-cha / "You Keep Me Hangin' On"	5	7	6	6	24	Safe
5	Paso doble / "Diablo Rojo"	7	9	10	N/A (Note: Tonioli was not present this show.)	26	Safe
6	Foxtrot / "Trouble"	8	8	8	8	32	Safe
7	Charleston / "Alexander's Ragtime Band"	9	9	9	9	36	Safe
8	Rumba / "One"	7	8	9	9	33	Safe
9	Salsa / "Ride on Time"	8	8	9	9	34	Safe
10	Quickstep / "Jumpin' Jack"; Paso doble-a-thon / "España cañí"	9	9	10	10	44 (Note: Awarded 6 extra points.)	Safe
11	Samba / "Money"	9	9	9	10	37	Safe
12	American Smooth / "Have You Met Miss Jones?"	8	9	9	9	35	Safe
12	Argentine tango / "Human"	8	9	9	9	35	Safe
13	Viennese waltz / "Somewhere My Love"	9	10	10	10	39	Winner
13	Showdance / "You Make My Dreams"	9	10	10	10	39	Winner
13	Charleston / "Alexander's Ragtime Band"	10	10	10	10	40	Winner

- Green number indicates Joe and Katya were at the top of the leaderboard.

=== Seann Walsh ===
She partnered the comedian and actor Seann Walsh for the 16th series of Strictly Come Dancing.

Week #	Dance / song	Judges' score				Total	Result
Week #	Dance / song	Horwood	Bussell	Ballas	Tonioli	Total	Result
1	Tango / "SexyBack"	3	5	4	6	18	No elimination
2	Jive / "I'm Still Standing"	2	4	4	5	15	Safe
3	Paso doble / "The Matrix (Theme)"	7	7	8	8	30	Safe
4	Charleston / "Bills"	6	7	8	7	28	Safe
5	Quickstep / "Lightning Bolt"	5	6	6	7^{A}	24	Bottom Two
6	Viennese waltz / "I Put a Spell on You"	3	5	6	6	20	Eliminated

- Red number indicates Seann and Katya were at the bottom of the leaderboard.
^A Alfonso Ribeiro filled in for Tonioli

=== Mike Bushell ===
She partnered the television presenter Mike Bushell for the 17th series of Strictly Come Dancing.

Week #	Dance / song	Judges' score				Total	Result
Week #	Dance / song	Horwood	Mabuse	Ballas	Tonioli	Total	Result
1	Jive / "Do You Love Me"	4	6	6	6	22	No elimination
2	American Smooth / "Rhinestone Cowboy"	3	4	3	4	14	Safe
3	Cha-cha-cha / "It's Raining Men"	3	5	5	5	18	Safe
4	Quickstep / "Come On Eileen"	7	9	8	8	32	Safe
5	Samba / "Apache (Jump on It)"	3	6	5	7^{A}	21	Bottom Two
6	Tango / "What You Waiting For?"	6	6	7	7	26	Bottom Two
7	Charleston / "Those Magnificent Men in their Flying Machines"	7	7	8	8	30	Bottom Two
8	Paso doble / "Tamacun"	5	7	7	6	25	Eliminated

- Red number indicates Mike and Katya were at the bottom of the leaderboard.

^A Alfonso Ribeiro filled in for Tonioli

=== Nicola Adams ===
She partnered the boxer Nicola Adams for the 18th series of Strictly Come Dancing. They had to leave the competition after week 3 when Jones tested positive for COVID-19.

Week #	Dance / song	Judges' score			Total	Result
	Dance / song	Horwood	Ballas	Mabuse	Total	Result
1	Quickstep / "Get Happy"	7	7	7	21	No elimination
2	Street / "Shine"	8	8	8	24	Safe
3	Jive / "Greased Lightnin'"	6	7	6	19	Bottom Two
4	American Smooth / "Stand By Me"	-	-	-	-	Withdrew

=== Adam Peaty ===
From September 2021, she partnered the Olympic swimmer Adam Peaty for the 19th series of Strictly Come Dancing. They reached week 7, coming ninth.

Week no.	Dance/Song	Judges' score				Total	Result
Week no.	Dance/Song	Horwood	Mabuse	Ballas	Du Beke	Total	Result
1	Cha-cha-cha / "Beggin'"	7	7	8	8	30	No elimination
2	Quickstep / "Are You Gonna Be My Girl"	4	5	5	5	19	Safe
3	Rumba / "I See You"	4	5	5	6	20	Safe
4	Argentine tango / "Tango in the Night"	8	8	8	8	32	Safe
5	Samba / "Faith"	7	7	8	7	29	Safe
6	Viennese waltz / "Moonlight Sonata"	6	8	8	7	29	Bottom two
7	Jive / "Little Bitty Pretty One"	6	7	7	7	27	Eliminated

=== Tony Adams ===
From September 2022, she partnered former England men's association football captain Tony Adams for the 20th series of Strictly Come Dancing. On week 8, they were announced in the bottom two against Tyler West (who was partnered with Dianne Buswell). However, they did not compete in the dance-off due to Adams sustaining a hamstring injury, subsequently leading him to withdraw from the competition.

Week no.	Dance/Song	Judges' score				Total	Result
Week no.	Dance/Song	Horwood	Mabuse	Ballas	Du Beke	Total	Result
1	Tango / "Go West"	3	4	4	4	15	No elimination
2	Charleston / "My Old Man's a Dustman"	4	6	6	6	22	Safe
3	Samba / "You Sexy Thing"	2	6	4	6	18	Safe
4	American Smooth / "With a Little Help from My Friends"	5	7	7	7	26	Safe
5	Cha-cha-cha / "Grandstand Theme"	3	6	4	6	19	Safe
6	Quickstep / "The Devil Went Down to Georgia"	7	8	8	8	31	Safe
7	Salsa / "I Know You Want Me" / "The Bomb!"	4	6	5	6	21	Safe
8	Jive / "Land of 1000 Dances"	4	6	7	7	24	Withdrew

- Red number indicates Tony and Katya were at the bottom of the leaderboard.

=== Nigel Harman ===
From September 2023, she was partnered by stage and screen actor Nigel Harman for the 21st series of Strictly Come Dancing. On week 11, just hours before the live show, Harman had to withdraw from the competition after sustaining a rib injury during rehearsals.

Week no.	Dance/Song	Judges' score				Total	Result
Week no.	Dance/Song	Horwood	Mabuse	Ballas	Du Beke	Total	Result
1	Paso doble / "Smells Like Teen Spirit"	8	8	8	8	32	No elimination
2	Viennese waltz / "Until I Found You"	7	7	6	7	27	Safe
3	Jive / "Theme from Batman"	6	6	6	7	25	Safe
4	Salsa / "Suavemente"	8	9	8	8	33	Safe
5	Foxtrot / "I Just Want to Make Love to You"	7	7	7	8	29	Safe
6	Cha-cha-cha / "I Was Made for Lovin' You"	8	7	7	8	30	Safe
7	Tango / "Nothing Breaks Like a Heart"	7	9	9	8	33	Safe
8	Couple's Choice / "Just the Way You Are"	8	8	9	9	34	Safe
9	Quickstep / "It Don't Mean a Thing (If It Ain't Got That Swing)"	7	8	8	8	31	Safe
10	Rumba / "It's All Coming Back to Me Now"	8	8	8	9	33	Safe
11	Charleston / "Step in Time"	-	-	-	-	-	Withdrew

- Green number indicates Nigel and Katya were at the top of the leaderboard.

=== Wynne Evans ===
From September 2024, she was partnered by opera singer and BBC Radio Wales presenter Wynne Evans on the 22nd series of Strictly Come Dancing.

Week no.	Dance/Song	Judges' score				Total	Result
Week no.	Dance/Song	Horwood	Mabuse	Ballas	Du Beke	Total	Result
1	Samba / "Help Yourself"	6	6	7	7	26	No elimination
2	Viennese waltz / "The Blue Danube"	7	7	8	8	30	Safe
3	Cha-cha-cha / "Papa's Got a Brand New Bag"	7	7	8	8	30	Safe
4	Tango / "Money, Money, Money"	8	9	9	8	34	Safe
5	Quickstep / "Mr. Blue Sky"	7	9	9	8	33	Safe
6	Salsa / "Canned Heat"	7	8	8	8	31	Safe
7	Rumba / "This Is My Life"	7	7	8	8	30	Safe
8	American Smooth / "Grace Kelly"	7	8	8	9	32	Bottom two
9	Charleston / "Les toréadors"	7	8	8	8	31	Eliminated

=== Lewis Cope ===
From September 2025, she was partnered with former Emmerdale actor Lewis Cope on the 23rd series of Strictly Come Dancing.

Week no.	Dance/Song	Judges' score				Total	Result
Week no.	Dance/Song	Horwood	Mabuse	Ballas	Du Beke	Total	Result
1	Jive / "Get Ready"	7	7	7	7	28	No elimination
2	Viennese waltz / "Lose Control"	7	7	6	7	27	Safe
3	Paso doble / "The Plaza of Execution"	9	10	9	9	37	Safe
4	Foxtrot / "L-O-V-E"	8	9	9	8	34	Safe
5	Quickstep / "Ring of Fire"	9	9	8	8	34	Safe
6	Couple's Choice / "Creep"	10	10	10	10	40	Safe
7	Cha-cha-cha / "I Like It Like That"	8	9	9	9	35	Safe
8	Tango / "12 to 12"	9	10	9	9	37	Safe
9	Charleston / "I Bet You Look Good on the Dancefloor"	10	10	10	10	40	No elimination
10	Rumba / "Falling"	9	9	9	9	36 (Note: The couple also received six extra points for their Jive to "Wake Me Up Before You Go-Go" by Wham! in the Instant Dance.)	Safe
11	Salsa / "The Dance at the Gym"	8	9	9	9	35	Eliminated

- Green number indicates Lewis and Katya were at the top of the leaderboard.

=== John Nellis ===
From September 2026, she was partnered with YouTuber John Nellis on the 24th series of Strictly Come Dancing.

Week no.	Dance/Song	Judges' score				Total	Result
Week no.	Dance/Song	Horwood	Mabuse	Ballas	Du Beke	Total	Result
1	Foxtrot / "Ordinary"	7	8	8	8	31	No Elimination
2	Couple's Choice / "An Irish Party in Third Class"	4	5	7	7	23	Safe
3	Cha-cha-cha / "Rock Your Body"	4	5	5	6	20	Safe
4	Paso doble / "It's My Life"	6	7	8	8	29	Safe
5	Quickstep / "Five Colours in her Hair"	7	8	8	9	32	Safe
6	Tango / "DANCE..."	8	9	9	9	35	Safe
7	Salsa / "Get Lucky"	4	7	7	8	26	Safe
8	Jive / "Pump It"	7	8	8	8	31	Safe
9	Viennese Waltz / "Hallelujah"	9	10	10	10	39	

=== Tour ===
Jones took part in the national Strictly Come Dancing – The Live Tour in 2024.

In 2024, it was announced she would be appearing at Donahey's Dancing with The Stars Weekends in 2025.

== Other television appearances ==
She appeared as a contestant in Celebrity Masterchef in 2022.

In April 2023, she appeared in series five of Celebrity Hunted, partnered with Olympic snowboarder Aimee Fuller, and was eliminated in the fifth episode. In 2025, Jones, alongside fellow Strictly professional Nancy Xu, starred in the short film Dakota Stone.

== Stage performances ==
Jones starred in the dance show Somnium: A Dancer's Dream, directed and choreographed by Neil Jones. The show was performed from 20 to 22 June 2019 at Sadler's Wells Theatre. She has also acted in various pantomimes.

== Filmography ==
Year	Title	Role	Notes
2025	Dakota Stone	Carolina	Main cast

== Personal life ==
Jones married her boyfriend of five years, Neil Jones, a dancer and fellow cast member of Strictly Come Dancing, on 3 August 2013. In October 2018, a video and photographs of Jones kissing her celebrity Strictly partner, Seann Walsh, were published. On 18 August 2019, Jones and her husband announced that they had separated.
