= Get Out (soundtrack) =

Get Out (Original Motion Picture Soundtrack)

Film score by Michael Abels
- Released: February 24, 2017
- Recorded: 2016–2017
- Genre: Film score
- Length: 60:11
- Label: Back Lot Music

Michael Abels chronology
Get Out (2017)	Us (2019)

Get Out (Original Motion Picture Soundtrack) is the score album to the 2017 film of the same name directed by Jordan Peele. The film is scored by California-based Michael Abels, in his first feature composition. Prior working as a schoolteacher in the music department in California, Abels was recruited after Peele listened to one of his instrumental cue which blended a range of genres.

The album had mostly used live instruments, as well as strings, harp and percussion, with some of them being sampled to create a much "creepier and darker score". He used Afro-American voices to represent the African ancestors who were affected by slavery, lynchings and other injustices, tying the protagonist which intended him to use the Swahili language and phrases in some cues, especially for the main title theme.

The score was released by Back Lot Music on February 24, 2017 on the same date as the film's release. It was critically acclaimed, with praise for its composition, vocal direction and musical language. It won the Black Reel Award for Outstanding Original Score. The soundtrack was released in a 180-gram double disc vinyl record by Waxwork Records on July 13, 2018.

== Development ==
Before working on Get Out, Abels had worked in the music department at the private school in Santa Monica, California and had never worked in feature films. Peele recruited Abels to score music after hearing his orchestral piece "Urban Legends" on YouTube which considered a blending of classical, jazz, blues and other musical forms, which resulted him that his music felt right for the film. Abels called the script as a "brilliant" which intended him to be a part of the film. Peele wanted the music to be "seriously scary" which intended to juggle a number of themes, but wanted a sparse music which also recalled classic horror films.

"The film has to tell a story so I knew that choosing Swahili would cause us to hear voices that we, as English speakers, would identify as African. Therefore, that was going to tell the story effectively. In choosing Swahili, I had to read up so I could be reasonably informed. What I learned was that Swahili was not the language of most of the Africans who became slaves. But Swahili is a very musical language and I'm writing music. I have poetic license to be able to successfully paint this picture. But I get that it's not authentic – it's designed for storytelling. I'm an American person of African descent and I've never been to Africa and I don't speak any African languages. What I know is what sounds African to American ears. That's the spirit I was coming from – storytelling with respect."

— Abels on the Western imagining of African music and culture

Peele requested Abels to have Afro-American voices in the score that represent the African souls lost form slavery, lynchings and other social injustices, tying Chris' ancestors, while also warning the protagonist to danger ahead. His research revealed that the African languages of the slaves were not particularly musical, hence he instead chose to use Swahili language because of its musicality. He worked with an eight person choir, letting them to chant several phrases in Swahili, including "run", "listen to the truth" and "save yourself", which play in seminal scenes as Chris begins to understand the situation he is in.

The main title "Sikiliza Kwa Wahenga" (transl. listen to the elders) were voices are meant to represent the departed slaves and lynching victims, who were trying to reach Chris and serve as the voice from the beyond. Abels felt that the use of Swahili is so that "we hear an African language in their tone yet we don't hear the exact words they're saying because the dead speak to us through imagery and emotion". As Abels was advised that the story was told from Chris' point of view, the music had to represent the same. In a garden party scene, he wrote a harpsichord concerto in the style of Vivaldi, the first piece he had written for the film, which Jordan had rejected and had to rewrite the composition to match Chris' point of view.

The primary instruments such as strings, harp and tuned percussive bowls were used to create a classic horror score. Brass has been used until the scenes that turned darker and also sampled libraries to hit creepy notes, which included an "eerie sound of violin bow on a metal bike spoke". He did not have a checklist of African instruments but also had a rhythmic pulse to the score, unlike a normal suspense score, it looked modern, which helped him incorporated the influence. He also preferred live instruments over electronic sounds, and used strings and rattles in order to sound unfamiliar.

== Track listing ==
No.	Title	Length
1.	"Prologue"	0:20
2.	"Sikiliza Kwa Wahenga (Main Title)"	1:19
3.	"Chris & Rose (Love Theme)"	2:05
4.	"The Deer"	1:00
5.	"The House"	1:20
6.	"Meet the Help"	0:45
7.	"The House Reprise"	0:31
8.	"Ice Tea"	0:51
9.	"Jeremy Enough"	0:23
10.	"Georgina's Silhouette"	0:12
11.	"Walter's Run"	0:16
12.	"Georgina at the Window"	0:40
13.	"Hypnosis"	4:17
14.	"Investigations"	2:48
15.	"Garden Party"	2:01
16.	"Andre Reveal"	1:08
17.	"Fist Shake"	0:39
18.	"Blind Art Dealer"	1:16
19.	"Georgina Weeps"	1:35
20.	"Get Out"	0:43
21.	"The Auction"	2:54
22.	"Ukulele Walk"	0:42
23.	"Photographs"	2:06
24.	"Finding the Keys"	2:26
25.	"The Sunken Place"	1:13
26.	"Rod's Bing Search"	1:51
27.	"Educational Video"	2:05
28.	"Behold the Coagula"	0:42
29.	"Rod Calls Rose"	2:42
30.	"Mental Prep"	3:52
31.	"Teacup TV"	0:18
32.	"Surgery Prep"	1:22
33.	"Chris Escapes"	1:04
34.	"Race for the Teacup"	1:54
35.	"Jeremy Attacks"	1:10
36.	"Georgina Hit"	0:47
37.	"Georgina Attacks"	0:17
38.	"After the Accident"	0:20
39.	"Get Him Grandpa"	1:16
40.	"Walter Shoots"	0:08
41.	"Rose Returns"	1:09
42.	"Situation Handled"	1:24
43.	"End Titles (Montage)"	4:20
Total length:		60:11

== Reception ==
Music critic Jonathan Broxton of Movie Music UK found the score to be "refreshingly different", calling it as "a new approach to scoring horror movies that was clearly inspired by Jordan Peele's own audacious take on the genre from the director's chair. The way Abels combines the African and Deep South vocals, and the jazz and blues influences, with the sequences of traditionally dissonant and challenging orchestral horror scoring is very impressive indeed. Whether this experience will inspire Michael Abels to tackle more film work in the future remains to be seen but, on the strength of this debut effort, anything he scores down the line will certainly have my interest."

Sean Wilson of MFiles wrote: "there's no denying that Get Out is one of the most varied, unusual and inventive horror soundtracks of recent years, drawing on a host of musical styles and tones and fusing them all together superbly. This is a complex, demanding film and demanded an equally complex score, one that's both in on the satire and capable of scaring the listener senseless. There's no denying that Michael Abels (and Timothy Williams) achieves both aims, putting the ghost of tedious 'stinger' horror scores in the grave and showing more established film composers how it's done. We seriously need to hear more from these guys." Mark Kermode of The Guardian complimented the score as "rich and deceptively complex". Richard Lawson of Vanity Fair praised Peele's musical choices and Abels' score are "spot-on" and "aptly sets a mood of winking dread".

== Accolades ==
Award	Date of ceremony	Category	Recipients	Result	Ref.
Black Reel Awards	February 22, 2018	Outstanding Score	Michael Abels	Won	
Hollywood Music in Media Awards	November 16, 2017	Best Original Score – Sci-Fi/Fantasy/Horror Film	Michael Abels	Nominated	
International Film Music Critics Association	February 8, 2018	Best Original Score for a Fantasy/Science Fiction/Horror Film	Michael Abels	Nominated	
World Soundtrack Awards	October 18, 2017	Discovery of the Year	Michael Abels	Nominated	
