= Cristian Priori =

Italian dancer and choreographer (born 1992)

- Born: 22 July 1992 (age 34); Rome, Italy
- Occupations: Dancer; choreographer
- Known for: Strictly Come Dancing

Cristian Priori (born 22 July 1992) is an Italian dancer and choreographer, known for appearing as a professional dancer on the BBC competition series Strictly Come Dancing since 2026.

== Life and career ==
Priori was born in Rome, Italy, on 22 July 1992. In his youth, he was a Junior Italian 10-Dance Champion. He subsequently went on to become a Rising Star Finalist at the UK Open and the Dutch Open. Priori is a four-time Italian Latin Champion and was ranked in the World's top 24 Latin dancers for eight consecutive years. He also became a Rising Star Latin Finalist at the Blackpool Dance Festival and an Open World Latin Semi-Finalist. Born in Rome, Cristian achieved dance success from a young age as the Junior Italian 10-Dance Champion.

In July 2026, Priori was announced to be joining the twenty-fourth series of the British version of Strictly Come Dancing as a professional dancer, alongside Maddie Ingoldsby, Mark Karmalita, Lethabo Monametsi and his competitive dance partner Aleksandra Isaeva. On joining the show, Priori said: "Saying yes to Strictly was an easy decision. Dance has always been my way of expressing myself, and I'm so excited to begin this new chapter. I'm ready to give my all, enjoy every moment of this amazing journey, and embrace everything it has to offer. Strictly is where passion, hard work and entertainment come together, so being part of it is a real privilege."

=== Strictly Come Dancing Christmas Special ===
It was announced that Priori will dance with Kimberley Walsh for the 2026 Strictly Come Dancing Christmas Special.
