= Maddie Ingoldsby =

English dancer and actress (born 2005)

- Born: Madison Vaughan Ingoldsby; 19 February 2005 (age 21); London, England
- Occupations: Dancer; actress
- Known for: Strictly Come Dancing

Madison Vaughan Ingoldsby (born 19 February 2005) is an English dancer and actress. As a child, she appeared in an amateur West End production of Annie, as well as the film Last Christmas (2019). She is best known for appearing as a professional dancer on the BBC competition series Strictly Come Dancing since 2026.

== Life and career ==
Madison Vaughan Ingoldsby was born on 19 February 2005 in London, England, and was raised in Henley-on-Thames. She attended Claires Court School. She trained with The British Theatre Academy from the age of 6. In 2016, Ingoldsby performed on Strictly Come Dancing as part of a professional group routine. She also appeared on the spin-off Strictly Come Dancing: It Takes Two. Ingoldsby also starred as the title character in a West End production of the musical Annie. In 2019, appeared in the film Last Christmas as a younger version of the lead character Kate, portrayed by Emilia Clarke. Ingoldsby is a UK National Ballroom Champion and eight-time Amateur 10-Dance World Champion. She has also been crowned Rising Star and Under 21 World Ballroom Champion.

In July 2026, Ingoldsby was announced to be joining the twenty-fourth series of Strictly Come Dancing as a professional dancer, alongside fellow newcomers Cristian Priori, Mark Karmalita, Lethabo Monametsi and Aleksandra Isaeva. For the series, she was partnered with Love Island winner Cach Mercer.
