= Tyler Henry =

American reality show personality

- Born: January 13, 1996 (age 30); Hanford, California, U.S.
- Occupations: Television personality; self-described psychic and medium
- Years active: 2015–present
- Television: Hollywood Medium with Tyler Henry; Life After Death with Tyler Henry
- Spouse: Clint Godwin (2025―present)
- Website: Official website

Tyler Henry Koelewyn (born January 13, 1996) is an American reality show personality who appears in the reality show series Hollywood Medium with Tyler Henry and Life After Death with Tyler Henry as a clairvoyant medium since 2016. He has published two books.

Critics state that Henry's readings are performed using deceptive cold reading and hot reading techniques, and not "psychic" powers.

== Life ==
Henry is a native of Hanford, California, a small rural city near Fresno. He graduated from Hanford's Sierra Pacific High School and did not complete college. Henry is gay, and married artist Clint Godwin in 2025. As of 2025, they live in Topanga, California.

== Career ==
According to Henry, he noticed that he had clairvoyant abilities when he was ten years old.

In November 2015, Henry appeared on Keeping Up with the Kardashians where he gave a reading to one of the Kardashian sisters.

In January 2016, Hollywood Medium with Tyler Henry premiered on E!. In March 2016, it was announced that E! had ordered a second season of the show. Henry published a memoir titled Between Two Worlds: Lessons from the Other Side the same year. In 2022, he published a second book, Here & Hereafter: How Wisdom from the Departed Can Transform Your Life Now.

A 2018 People article detailed Henry's claims about his abilities, the development of his "powers", and his reading with La Toya Jackson set to air in the new season of Hollywood Medium, in which he claimed to contact Michael Jackson.

Hollywood Medium ended after four seasons in 2019.

His series, Life After Death with Tyler Henry, premiered on March 11, 2022, on Netflix, and was completed after one season of nine episodes. In 2024, he starred in another Netflix series titled Live from the Other Side with Tyler Henry.

Henry has given readings to many celebrities, such as Nancy Grace, Alan Thicke, retired NBA player John Salley and actors Monica Potter, Soleil Moon Frye, Amber Rose, Jaleel White, the Kardashians, Corey Feldman, Carmen Electra, Matt Lauer, Chad Michael Murray, Rick Fox, Megan Fox, Chrissy Metz, Kristin Cavallari, Bobby Brown, Roselyn Sanchez, The Try Guys, and Tom Arnold.

=== Death of Alan Thicke ===
On December 13, 2016, actor Alan Thicke died due to aortic dissection at the age of 69. Several months before his death, Thicke was the subject of a reading done for the Hollywood Medium TV show. Among the many topics discussed by Henry, the concern of possible heart and blood pressure problems was addressed, with Henry suggesting that Thicke had a heart and blood pressure problem like "multiple men" in Thicke's family. After Thicke died, this part of his reading was referenced by Henry's fans as evidence that Henry had actually predicted Thicke's death. Various news outlets reported on this. Scientific skepticism activist Susan Gerbic challenged the claim that this was a successful psychic prediction, arguing that "Henry was again playing the odds" given that heart disease is the "number one cause of death for American males".

== Critical analysis ==
Scientific skeptics argue that mediumship is a con and that Henry is not an exception. Skeptical activists and others concerned with Henry's rise in popularity have actively attempted to counter the public perception that what Henry claims to do reflects reality. In particular, they have argued that Henry relies on a mix of cold reading techniques and prior knowledge of his subjects, or hot reading, to make his claims. Specific examples where it is alleged that he used these techniques include sessions with Ronda Rousey, Carole Radziwill, Matt Lauer, and Nancy Grace.

Critics have argued that Henry's actions are exploitative, and he has been dismissed as one of many mediums who lack training in counseling, resulting in a "tremendous" risk of harm. Henry reportedly welcomes skepticism about his work: "I am content with people asking questions", he stated in 2016.

== Bibliography ==
- Between Two Worlds: Lessons from the Other Side. Simon and Schuster. 2016. ISBN 9781501152658.
- Here & Hereafter: How Wisdom from the Departed Can Transform Your Life Now. St. Martin's Publishing Group. 2022. ISBN 9781250796783.
