= Revolting Children =

Song by Matilda the Musical cast

from the album Matilda the Musical (Original London Cast Recording)
- Language: English
- Released: 2011
- Recorded: May 2011
- Studio: AIR Studios
- Genre: Show tune
- Length: 2:32
- Songwriter: Tim Minchin

"Revolting Children" is a song from the 2010 musical Matilda.

== Synopsis ==
The children stand up and revolt against the cruel principal Miss Trunchbull. Financial Times said "in [Matilda's] ultimate uprising with chums at school, [the children] re-define what it means to be called “revolting children” by Trunchbull".

The New York Times explains:

"Revolting children" is what their headmistress had been calling them. And now, led by a polysyllabic little girl with the gift of telekinesis, they’ve turned an insult into a battle cry. These very armed, revolting children have learned one of the first lessons of revolution: who owns the language has the superpower.

== Composition ==
"Revolting Children" is a disco-inspired composition that relies on a lyrical double entendre regarding the word "revolting", which can mean either disgusting or revolutionary. The song also mentions within the lyrics Revolting Rhymes, which is a nod to the Roald Dahl collection of poems with the same name.

== Critical reception ==
The School Library Journal wrote "You can’t help but love songs with double meanings like the oh-so appropriately named 'Revolting Children'". The New York Times deemed it a "rousing final number" and "an anthem of liberation", suggesting "which Mr. Darling has choreographed with a wink at Bill T. Jones’s work on “Spring Awakening”". Time Out wrote, "The final number, 'Revolting Children,' plays on the notion that minors can be both repugnant and a source of social upheaval: 'Revolting children / Living in revolting times / We sing revolting songs / Using revolting rhymes.' There’s a lesson for you tweens: You’ve inherited a lousy culture, so why not make a song and dance about it?". The British Theatre Guide deemed the song "memorable", while Chortle called it "triumphant". The Hollywood Reporter wrote the students "reclaim Trunchbull's scorn as an anthem of rebellion". Entertainment Weekly argued there was slowing down in momentum in the second act "between that growing-up song and the anarchic, Spring Awakening-like final number, Revolting Children". Echoing what many reviewers said about Minchin's witty lyrics being lost due to lack of diction, it said of Revolting Children: "that song is one of several whose tongue-twisting lyrics seem like a mouthful for very young performers less trained in enunciation." Matt Patches of Polygon named the film adaptation's rendition of the song and its musical sequence as one of the best movie scenes of 2022.

== Parodies and covers ==
In the 2014 version of the theatre spoof Forbidden Broadway, a cast member playing director Matthew Warchus and dressed as Miss Trunchbull sings 'I love exploiting children/I love exploiting shows/I whip their little asses and line them up in rows' to the tune of "Revolting Children".
