= Us (soundtrack) =

Us (Original Motion Picture Soundtrack)

Film score by Michael Abels
- Released: March 15, 2019
- Recorded: 2018–2019
- Genre: Film score
- Length: 74:59
- Label: Back Lot Music
- Producer: Michael Abels

Michael Abels chronology
Get Out (2017)	Us (2019)	See You Yesterday (2019)

Us (Original Motion Picture Soundtrack) is the soundtrack to the 2019 film of the same name directed by Jordan Peele and featured musical score composed by Michael Abels in his second feature. The soundtrack was released by Back Lot Music on March 15, 2019, featuring Abels' original score, and three tracks heard in the film—"I Like That" by Janelle Monáe, "I Got 5 on It" by Luniz and "Les Fleurs" by Minnie Riperton. The remixed version of "I Got 5 on It" preceded the album. The vinyl edition of the soundtrack was released on September 13, 2019.

== Development ==
The film is Abels' second feature composition, although he contributed additional music for the film Detroit (2017), and his second with Peele. Abels recalled that Peele would like to hear music during the pre-production, as it helps him to design the sonic world as well as with the visual world. Although Peele did the same in Get Out, the film had a different story and the music had to identify the characters and story, and Peele wanted him to experiment with duality in music, as it was an overarching theme in the film itself. Abels came up with traditional and non-traditional sounds being experimented to come up with the appropriate sonic palette, hence the film's music used variety of instruments such as violin, cimbalom, amongst others. The track "Beach Walk" had several instruments such as karimba, berimbau and didgeridoo playing together, all from different cultures.

Abels did not have specific instruments signifying each characters, as the film had different sorts of music which would be restricting. However, for Umbrae's (Zora's doppelgänger) character, the cimbalom seemed to work well in her scenes. The solo violin was played in scenes surrounding over Red (Adelaide's doppelgänger) which expressed Red's quest for justice, the menacing malevolence and her freedom of spirit very well. However, Abels felt that the stand out element in the music is the choral work. Jordan specifically described that he wanted the voices to be in the soundtrack.

The first track "Anthem" is a vocal choir rising in volume with the drum beats and chimes, which Abels wanted it to sound like an "evil march". He further described it as "One thing that Jordan loves to do and is becoming known for is [to] take something you always assumed was safe or innocent and turn it into something else" citing the children's voice as one example as he thought it would be "super scary". Abels described the lyrics and language, saying "the voices are not [singing in] a language, it's nonsense syllables so you focus more on their feeling and the music – you can tell something's coming and it's not good, these people mean business but you can't tell exactly what it is they want. It was important that they sounded like not like any specific culture, they sounded like they were organized and evil but not foreign."

The 1995 Luniz single "I Got 5 on It" had an original as well as a tethered orchestral remix being played in the showdown between Adelaide and Red. Abels felt that "the original intention from the script was that the scene would be underscored by "Pas de deux" from Pyotr Ilyich Tchaikovsky's The Nutcracker (1892)" where the longer version of that scene is scored that way. He further recalled that, "the idea was that we would use that music, or I was going to make a horror version of that, and it was an exciting challenge that I was looking forward to, but it was clear to Jordan, following the response of the trailer, what needed to be done." It had an "haunting lick to it" comparing Angelo Badalamenti's score for A Nightmare on Elm Street 3: Dream Warriors (1987) and being a "total banger" at the same time. The track "Pas de Deux" is also featured in the film, has been twisted on Club Nouveau's "Why You Treat Me So Bad" a song which "I Got 5 on It" being sampled. This beat had been slowed down and strung out on violins, to build suspense into a crescendo of jarring, discordant sounds.

== Track listing ==
No.	Title	Artist(s)	Length
1.	"Anthem"		2:57
2.	"I Like That"	Janelle Monáe	3:22
3.	"Outernet"		0:46
4.	"Spider"		1:17
5.	"Ballet Memory"		1:11
6.	"I Got 5 On It"	Luniz featuring Michael Marshall	4:15
7.	"Beach Walk"		1:23
8.	"First Man Standing"		0:44
9.	"Back to the House"		1:10
10.	"Keep You Safe"		1:36
11.	"Don't Feel Like Myself"		2:00
12.	"She Tried to Kill Me"		1:46
13.	"Boogieman's Family"		1:25
14.	"Home Invasion"		4:11
15.	"Once Upon a Time"		2:59
16.	"Run"		4:39
17.	"Into the Water"		2:23
18.	"Spark in the Closet"		2:58
19.	"Escape to the Boat"		1:18
20.	"Femme Fatale"		2:13
21.	"Silent Scream"		1:24
22.	"News Report"		2:02
23.	"Zora Drives"		1:42
24.	"Death of Umbrae"		0:55
25.	"Somber Ride"		1:07
26.	"Immolation"		1:40
27.	"Down the Rabbit Hole"		2:34
28.	"Performance Art"		1:20
29.	"Human"		4:03
30.	"Battle Plan"		0:59
31.	"Pas De Deux"		2:51
32.	"They Can't Hurt You"		1:45
33.	"Finale"		3:05
34.	"Les Fleurs"	Minnie Riperton	3:16
35.	"I Got 5 On It (Tethered Mix from US)"	Luniz feat. Michael Marshall	1:43
Total length:			74:59

== Reception ==
Music critic Jonathan Broxton commented "Although the creepy Latin chanting is certainly effective, and although the 'I Got 5 On It' remix from the finale has already worked its way into public consciousness, the rest of the score has too much traditional abstract horror music for it to cross over from the film music niche and into the mainstream. Some of the specific instrumental textures are interesting, and the intellectual concept behind much of the writing is fine, but I fear that too many people will simply pass over the bulk of the score's middle section, having dismissed it as pretty typical thriller fare."

Tim Grierson of Screen International commented that Abels' "nerve-jangling instrumentals" underscore the "elegant, brutally efficient scares". Peter Bradshaw of The Guardian felt that Abels' music "has the same disturbing "Satan spiritual" feel of his compositions for Get Out". Writing for the same website, Mark Kermode had commented "blends brooding polytonal drones with stabby strings, interspersed by inventive use of the human voice. A quasi-gothic choral Anthem evokes the chills of Jerry Goldsmith's Ave Satani from The Omen, while jukebox tracks by Luniz, Minnie Riperton and (most pointedly) NWA are strategically deployed to hilariously horrifying effect." Lindsey Romain of Nerdist commented "Music is a huge part of Us, from Michael Abels' fantastic score to the use of Luniz's "I Got Five On It," which makes an appearance in the trailer and is put to even better use in the language of the film. Peele knows how to let music make a mood."

== Accolades ==
Award	Date of ceremony	Category	Recipient(s)	Result
Austin Film Critics Association	January 7, 2020	Best Original Score	Michael Abels	Nominated
Black Reel Awards	February 6, 2020	Outstanding Score	Michael Abels	Won
Chicago Film Critics Association	December 14, 2019	Best Score	Michael Abels	Nominated
Critics' Choice Movie Awards	January 12, 2020	Best Score	Michael Abels	Nominated
Georgia Film Critics Association	January 10, 2020	Best Original Score	Michael Abels	Nominated
Hollywood Critics Association	January 9, 2020	Best Score	Michael Abels	Nominated
Hollywood Music in Media Awards	November 20, 2019	Original Score — Horror Film	Michael Abels	Won
Houston Film Critics Society	January 2, 2020	Best Original Score	Michael Abels	Nominated
NAACP Image Awards	February 22, 2020	Outstanding Soundtrack/Compilation Album	Michael Abels	Nominated
Online Film Critics Society	January 6, 2020	Best Score	Michael Abels	Won
Seattle Film Critics Society	December 13, 2019	Best Score	Michael Abels	Nominated
Washington D.C. Area Film Critics Association	December 8, 2019	Best Score	Michael Abels	Won
World Soundtrack Awards	October 18, 2019	Discovery of the Year	Michael Abels	Won
