= Live from the Other Side with Tyler Henry =

American Netflix live reality television series (2024)

- Genre: Reality television
- Presented by: Tyler Henry
- Country of origin: United States
- Original language: English
- No. of seasons: 1
- No. of episodes: 8

Original release
- Network: Netflix
- Release: September 17 – November 5, 2024

Related
- Life After Death with Tyler Henry

Live from the Other Side with Tyler Henry is an American live reality television series produced for Netflix. The series features medium Tyler Henry, who provides readings for celebrity guests in a live broadcast format. It premiered on September 17, 2024, as part of Netflix's expansion into live programming.

== Overview ==
The series serves as a follow-up to Henry's previous Netflix series, Life After Death with Tyler Henry (2022). Unlike its predecessor, which was pre-recorded and edited, Live from the Other Side is broadcast in real-time. Each 45-minute episode features Henry meeting with celebrity guests—and occasionally their friends or family—to provide what he describes as "hope, healing, and long-sought-after answers" from deceased loved ones.

The show is produced by 44 Blue Productions and Corbett/Stern Productions. Executive producers include Michael Corbett, Larry Stern, Stephanie Noonan Drachkovitch, David Hale, and Jill Dickerson.

== Format ==
Live from the Other Side with Tyler Henry was promoted as a weekly live series, airing on Tuesday evenings. Episodes feature a studio audience and are moderated by Amanda Kloots, who introduces guests and facilitates conversation during and after the readings.

== Notable guests ==
- Chrishell Stause
- Kristin Chenoweth
- Jordyn Woods
- Fortune Feimster
- Rob Gronkowski

== Reception ==
Critical reception to Live from the Other Side with Tyler Henry was mixed to negative. Critics largely focused on skepticism regarding televised mediumship and the ethical implications of presenting clairvoyant readings as live entertainment.

The Guardian described the show as "dreary" and "unconvincing," with critic Stuart Heritage labeling it "the worst live TV event ever." The website Reality Blurred similarly criticized the live structure, arguing that it exposed inaccuracies and weakened the credibility of the readings.
