= Dogs Behaving (Very) Badly (TV programme) =

Documentary television series

- Also known as: Dogs Behaving Badly
- Genre: Observational documentary
- Presented by: Graeme Hall
- Country of origin: United Kingdom
- Original language: English
- No. of seasons: 7 (as of 2025)

Production
- Production company: Avalon Entertainment

Original release
- Network: Channel 4
- Release: 11 March 2017
- Network: Channel 5
- Release: 15 January 2019 – present

Dogs Behaving (Very) Badly is a British observational documentary television series about badly-behaved dogs. It premiered on 15 January 2019 on Channel 5, after the series debuted as a one-off documentary titled Dogs Behaving Badly aired on 11 March 2017 on Channel 4.

== Production ==
The series was originally titled Dogs Behaving Badly and broadcast on Channel 4. The dogs in the series are trained by Graeme Hall, who is also the presenter. It is produced by Avalon Entertainment and has since been renewed for 8 seasons. Six seasons have aired so far.

== Release ==
The series debuted as Dogs Behaving Badly on Channel 4 on 11 March 2017, as a one-off documentary. The series debuted as Dogs Behaving (Very) Badly on Channel 5 on 15 January 2019.

== International versions ==
An Australian version of the documentary series titled Dogs Behaving (Very) Badly Australia, narrated by comedian Julia Morris premiered on 13 July 2023 on Paramount-owned Network 10, hosted by Hall. A second season of the Australian version of the series premiered on 23 July 2024 on 10.

== Reception ==
Sean O'Grady of The Independent, gave the series a 4 star rating, writing "Shows such as Dogs Behaving (Very) Badly (Channel 5) serve a wider social purpose than mere entertainment, enjoyable as they are to watch."
