= Aleksandra Isaeva =

Ukrainian dancer and choreographer (born 2004)

- Born: 21 July 2004 (age 22); Ukraine
- Occupations: Dancer; choreographer
- Known for: Strictly Come Dancing

Aleksandra Isaeva (Ukrainian: Олександра Ісаєва; born 21 July 2004) is a Ukrainian dancer and choreographer, known for appearing as a professional dancer on the BBC competition series Strictly Come Dancing since 2026.

== Life and career ==
Isaeva was born on 21 July 2004 in Ukraine. She is a multiple Ukrainian National Latin Champion has is ranked in the World's Top 21 Latin dancers. Isaeva has reached top 10 positions at both the European Latin Championships in Blackpool and the Dutch Open's World Latin Dance Competition, as well as becoming a finalist at the UK Dance Festival's Latin Rising Star competition. Isaeva resides in Italy.

In July 2026, Isaeva was announced to be joining the twenty-fourth series of the British version of Strictly Come Dancing as a professional dancer, alongside Maddie Ingoldsby, Mark Karmalita, Lethabo Monametsi and her competitive dance partner Cristian Priori. Following the announcement, Isaeva said: "I've been living and breathing dance for as long as I can remember, so joining the Strictly Come Dancing family is a true honour. The thought of learning from and sharing this experience with such extraordinary dancers, choreographers and the whole Strictly family still gives me goosebumps. I can't wait to pour my whole heart into every performance, inspire others and be inspired along the way!".
