= John Nellis =

Northern Irish social media personality (born 1993)

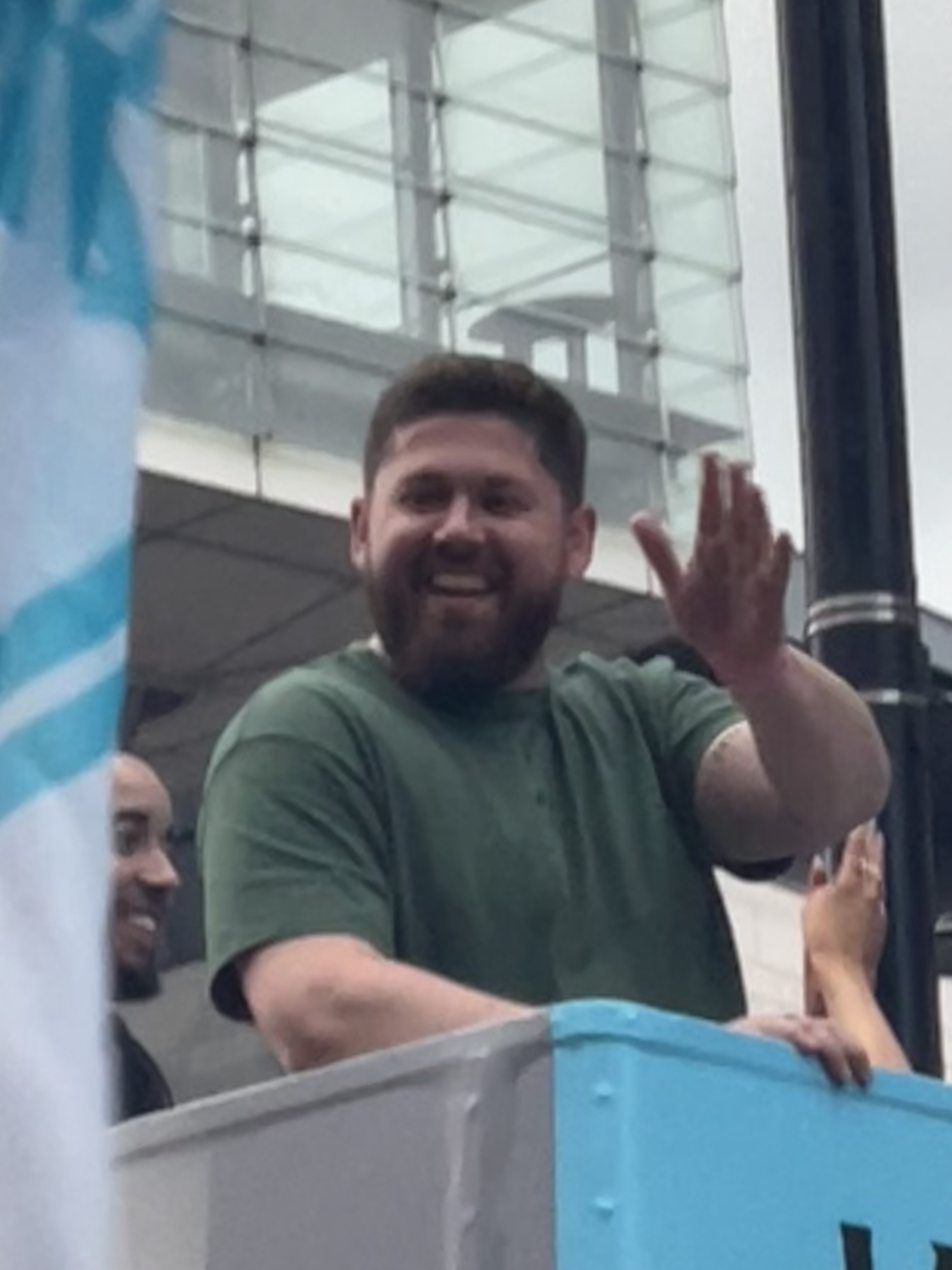
- Nellis in 2024
- Born: 18 June 1993 (age 33); Newcastle, County Down, Northern Ireland
- Occupations: Social media personality; YouTuber
- Years active: 2022–present
- Spouse: Shannon McMahon (m. 2025)
- Children: 1

TikTok information
- Page: johnnellis_
- Followers: 2.6 million

YouTube information
- Channel: John Nellis
- Genres: Football; entertainment; vlog; reaction
- Subscribers: 15.7 million
- Views: 11 billion

John Nellis (born 18 June 1993) is a Northern Irish social media personality and YouTuber. After leaving his job as an air traffic controller he began pursuing content creation on his TikTok and YouTube accounts as a career in 2022, with his channels consisting primarily of football-related content. He has since amassed over 20 million followers across all social media platforms. In 2026, he is set to appear as a contestant on the twenty-fourth series of Strictly Come Dancing.

== Life and career ==
John Nellis was born on 18 June 1993 in Newcastle, County Down, to parents Emma and Tony Nellis. He has a sister, Fiona. He attended Shimna Integrated College, during which time he was given his first job at Royal County Down Golf Club, raking bunkers on the Annesley Links. After leaving school, he held various jobs including as a kitchen porter, a barman, an ice cream server, a pizza maker, a science technician, and as a social worker at Autism Initiatives. In 2014, he began working as an air traffic controller at Cork Airport. His love of football stemmed from watching the 2002 FIFA World Cup, which ignited his interest in the sport, after which he would collect Premier League stickers as well as partaking in fantasy football.

Nellis set up his YouTube account in 2019, and said he started the channel because he "basically was in a job that was a great job, but it was relatively dead-end", deciding to begin a hobby during his time off from work. In 2022, Nellis quit his job after eight years to pursue content creation as a full time career, and has a tattoo of the number 7,431, the number of subscribers he had on the day he left. His channel began to grow during the 2022 FIFA World Cup and he has since amassed over 16 million subscribers on YouTube, and a further 2 million on TikTok, primarily posting videos about football. His content has featured him meeting various footballers including Kylian Mbappé, Rayan Cherki, Cristiano Ronaldo, Lionel Messi and Erling Haaland. In December 2024, won the award for Sports Creator of the Year at the TikTok Awards UK & Ireland. Nellis married Shannon McMahon in June 2025. He has a son.

In May 2026, Nellis took part in the Sidemen Eleven All Stars England vs. France match as part of the England squad. In August 2026, Nellis was announced as a contestant on the twenty-fourth series of Strictly Come Dancing. On joining the show Nellis said "I'm still in disbelief that I've been selected for Strictly and, if I'm honest, I'm a little nervous as I've never danced before! It's such an incredible opportunity, and I'm going to throw myself into every moment. I can't wait to meet everyone, learn a new skill and, hopefully, be much better at family parties by the end of it!".

== Filmography ==
As himself
Year	Title	Notes	Ref.
2026	Strictly Come Dancing	Contestant; series 24	

== Awards and nominations ==
Year	Award	Category	Result	Ref.
2024	TikTok Awards UK & Ireland	Sports Creator of the Year	Won	
