= Neil Jones (dancer) =

British dancer and choreographer (born 1982)

- Born: 4 May 1982 (age 44); Münster, West Germany
- Citizenship: United Kingdom
- Occupations: Dancer; choreographer
- Height: 5 ft 9 in (175 cm)
- Spouses: Katya Sokolova (m. 2013; div. 2019); Chyna Mills (m. 2026)
- Children: 1

Neil Jones (born 4 May 1982) is a British dancer and choreographer, best known for his role as a professional dancer in the BBC One dance series Strictly Come Dancing.

== Dance career ==
Jones began dancing at the age of three. He has danced ballet and trained in tap, modern, ballroom and Latin styles.

He has represented Finland, the Netherlands and the UK during the course of his competitive career. He holds 45 dance championship titles, including eight times British National, eight times Dutch National, European and four times World Latin Champion including World Latin Showdance Champion.

With his partner Katya Jones he was introduced at Blackpool in 2008. The couple became undefeated four-time British National Champions, and the three-time winners of the World Amateur Latin Championships. Katya Jones is also a professional dancer who also appears on the BBC celebrity dancing show Strictly Come Dancing.

In 2016 he appeared in series 14 of Strictly Come Dancing. He was not partnered with a celebrity, but participated in group dances and was on standby for any female celebrity whose partner was unable to dance, though this did not happen. Female dancer Chloe Hewitt performed the same role for the male celebrities. Jones also appeared in the Children in Need 2016 Strictly Come Dancing special, where he was partnered with Hollie Webb. Jones took part in the national Strictly Come Dancing - The Live Tour in 2017.

In August 2021, Jones announced he would be appearing with Katya Jones at Donahey's Dancing with The Stars Weekend in 2022.

=== Strictly Come Dancing ===
Series	Partner	Place	Average score
17	Alex Scott	5th	27.7
19	Nina Wadia	15th	21.0
22	Toyah Willcox	14th	15.0

Highest and lowest scoring per dance

Dance	Partner	Highest	Partner	Lowest
American Smooth	Alex Scott	31		
Argentine Tango	Alex Scott	26		
Cha-cha-cha	Alex Scott	22		
Charleston	Alex Scott	33		
Couple's Choice	Alex Scott	34		
Foxtrot				
Jive	Alex Scott	31	Toyah Willcox	18
Paso Doble	Alex Scott	34		
Quickstep	Alex Scott	21		
Rumba	Alex Scott	23		
Salsa				
Samba	Alex Scott	27	Toyah Willcox	15
Showdance				
Tango	Alex Scott	23	Toyah Willcox	12
Viennese Waltz				
Waltz				

=== Performances with Alex Scott ===
He partnered former professional footballer Alex Scott, for the seventeenth season of Strictly Come Dancing, the first time he partnered a celebrity. The couple were eliminated in week 11, coming 5th.

Week No.	Dance/Song	Judges' score				Total	Result
Week No.	Dance/Song	Horwood	Mabuse	Ballas	Tonioli	Total	Result
1	Quickstep/ "I Get a Kick Out of You"	5	5	5	6	21	No Elimination
2	Cha cha cha / "What I Did for Love"	4	6	6	6	22	Safe
3	Rumba/ "How Far I'll Go"	5	6	6	6	23	Safe
4	Tango/ "Go Your Own Way"	4	6	6	7	23	Safe
5	Charleston / "Pump Up the Jam"	8	8	8	9*	33	Safe
6	Street / "Ghostbusters"	7	9	9	9	34**	Safe
7	American Smooth / "Ain't No Mountain High Enough"	7	8	8	8	31**	Safe
8	Jive / "Let's Twist Again"	7	8	8	8	31	Safe
9	Paso Doble / "Run the World (Girls)"	8	8	9	9	34	Safe
10	Argentine Tango / "Never Tear Us Apart"	4	7	7	8	26	Safe
11	Samba / "Joyful Joyful"	6	7	7	7	27	Eliminated

* Score awarded by guest judge Alfonso Ribeiro
** Neil was injured during week 6 rehearsals, so Graziano Di Prima danced in his place

- Red number indicates Alex and Neil were at the bottom of the leaderboard

=== Performances with Nina Wadia ===
From September 2021, Jones was a contestant for the nineteenth series of Strictly Come Dancing, paired with actress Nina Wadia. The couple were the first to be eliminated, in the second week.

Week No.	Dance/Song	Judges' score				Total	Result
Week No.	Dance/Song	Horwood	Mabuse	Ballas	Du Beke	Total	Result
1	Samba / "Mi Gente"	5	5	7	7	24	No Elimination
2	Tango / "Would I Lie to You?"	3	5	5	5	18	Eliminated

- Red number indicates Nina and Neil were at the bottom of the leaderboard

=== Performances with Toyah Willcox ===
From September 2024, Jones was a contestant for the twenty-second series of Strictly Come Dancing, paired with singer and actress Toyah Willcox.

Week No.	Dance/Song	Judges' score				Total	Result
Week No.	Dance/Song	Horwood	Mabuse	Ballas	Du Beke	Total	Result
1	Tango / "Ray of Light"	2	4	2	4	12	No Elimination
2	Jive / "Nutbush City Limits"	3	5	5	5	18	Bottom Two
3	Samba / "Poor Unfortunate Souls"	3	4	4	4	15	Eliminated

- Red number indicates Toyah and Neil were at the bottom of the leaderboard

=== Stage performances ===
Jones directed, choreographed and starred in dance show Somnium: A Dancer's Dream alongside Katya Jones. The show was performed from the 20–22 June 2019 at Sadler's Wells Theatre.

In 2021 it was announced Jones would be appearing with Katya Jones at Donahey's Dancing with The Stars Weekends in 2022.

== Personal life ==
Jones was born in the British Army Camp in Münster, West Germany.

Jones married fellow Strictly Come Dancing professional dancer Katya Jones (née Sokolova) in August 2013. During the 2018 series, media interest in Katya's relationship with her series partner Seann Walsh led to both publicly apologising for their conduct after a video and photos of the two kissing were published. After six years of marriage, on 18 August 2019, Neil and Katya announced their separation. The Walsh incident was partly blamed for the split, but the couple insisted they would remain friends and would both continue to appear on Strictly. He confirmed in August 2020 that he was in a new relationship, his partner was later revealed to be Colombian dancer Luisa Eusse. In December 2020 Jones and Eusse parted.

In late August 2022, Jones and Love Island contestant Chyna Mills appeared on a red carpet together leading to speculation of a relationship, which was later confirmed in September. In April 2023, the couple announced that they were engaged and expecting their first child. Their daughter, Havana, was born in October 2023. Jones and Mills were married on 1 July 2026 at the Old Marylebone Town Hall in London.
