= Luba Mushtuk =

Russian dancer and choreographer

- Люба Муштук
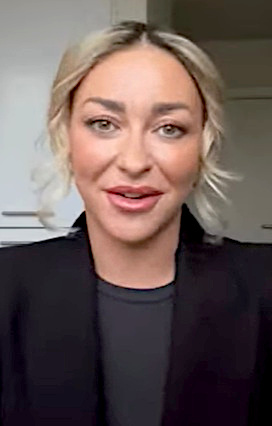
- Mushtuk in 2024
- Born: 14 November 1989 (age 36); Leningrad, RSFSR, Soviet Union (now Saint Petersburg, Russia)
- Occupations: Dancer and choreographer
- Known for: Strictly Come Dancing

Luba Mushtuk (Russian: Люба Муштук; born 14 November 1989) is a Russian-British dancer and choreographer. Between 2018 and 2025, she appeared a professional dancer on the British dance competition show Strictly Come Dancing.

== Early life ==
Mushtuk was born in Saint Petersburg, Russia. When she was twelve she moved to Italy to dance. She announced on Instagram on November 20, 2023 that she had become a British citizen.

== Career ==
Mushtuk is four-time Italian Dance Championship and an Italian Open Latin Show Dance champion. She came in second place in the European 10 Dance Championships and was a finalist at the Latin European Championships.

=== Strictly Come Dancing ===
In 2018, the BBC announced that Mushtuk would join the cast of professional dancers on the British television show Strictly Come Dancing. She won the Children in Need special that year with the Irish singer Shane Lynch. She has also competed in the Christmas Special four times: with Jake Wood in 2018, Jay Blades in 2021, Rickie Haywood-Williams in 2022 and Nicholas Bailey in 2025.

In 2019, Mushtuk was partnered with the rower James Cracknell. They were the first couple to be eliminated after losing the first dance-off to David James and Nadiya Bychkova. In 2020, she was partnered with the former NFL player and sports pundit, Jason Bell. They were the second couple to be eliminated after losing the second dance-off to Nicola Adams and Katya Jones.

After two series without a celebrity partner and participating only in the professional dances, she was partnered with the actor Adam Thomas for in 2023. They were the sixth couple to be eliminated after losing the fifth dance-off to Angela Rippon and Kai Widdrington. In 2024, she was partnered with TV presenter Nick Knowles They were the third couple to be eliminated after losing the dance off to Shayne Ward and Nancy Xu. Mushtuk did not receive a partner for the twenty-third series, and it was subsequently revealed the following year that she would be departing the show along with several other professional dancers. Speaking on her exit, Mushtuk thanked the show for "the amazing opportunity and unforgettable memories" and said "it [had] truly meant the world to [her]".

Series	Partner	Place	Average Score
17	James Cracknell	15th	12.0
18	Jason Bell	11th	20.3
21	Adam Thomas	9th	27.3
22	Nick Knowles	13th	20.0

Highest and lowest scoring per dance

Dance	Partner	Highest	Partner	Lowest
American Smooth	Adam Thomas	32	Jason Bell; Nick Knowles	21
Cha-cha-cha	Adam Thomas	19		
Charleston	Nick Knowles	21		
Couple's Choice	Adam Thomas	32		
Jive	Adam Thomas	26	James Cracknell	13
Paso Doble	Jason Bell	16		
Rumba	Adam Thomas	27		
Salsa	Jason Bell	24		
Tango	Adam Thomas	23	James Cracknell	11
Waltz	Adam Thomas	32		

- Red numbers indicate Luba and her partner were at the bottom of the leaderboard that week.

==== Series 17 ====
Celebrity partner: James Cracknell

Week No.	Dance/Song	Judges' score (Note: Individual judges' scores are listed in the following order: Craig Revel Horwood, Motsi Mabuse, Shirley Ballas, Bruno Tonioli.)				Total	Result
1	Tango / "Gold"	2	3	3	3	11	No Elimination
2	Jive / "Tutti Frutti"	3	3	3	4	13	Eliminated

==== Series 18 ====
Celebrity partner: Jason Bell

Week No.	Dance/Song	Judges' score (Note: Individual judges' scores are listed in the following order: Craig Revel Horwood, Motsi Mabuse and Shirley Ballas.)			Total	Result
1	American Smooth / "My Girl"	4	6	6	16	No Elimination
2	Salsa / "Get Lucky"	6	6	6	18	Safe
3	Paso Doble / "Star Wars Theme"	3	4	5	12	Eliminated

==== Series 21 ====
Celebrity partner: Adam Thomas

Week No.	Dance/Song	Judges' score (Note: Individual judges' scores are listed in the following order: Craig Revel Horwood, Motsi Mabuse, Shirley Ballas, Anton Du Beke.)				Total	Result
1	Cha-cha-cha / "Waffle House"	4	5	5	5	19	No Elimination
2	Tango / "Somebody Told Me"	5	6	5	7	23	Safe
3	Jive / "Take On Me"	5	7	7	7	26	Safe
4	Waltz / "I Wonder Why"	8	8	8	8	32	Safe
5	Couple's Choice / "Backstreet Boys medley"	7	8	8	9	32	Safe
6	American Smooth / "Magic Moments"	7	9	8	8	32	Bottom two
7	Rumba / "Dancing on My Own"	6	7	7	7	27	Eliminated

==== Series 22 ====
Celebrity partner: Nick Knowles

Week No.	Dance/Song	Judges' score (Note: Individual judges' scores are listed in the following order: Craig Revel Horwood, Motsi Mabuse, Shirley Ballas, Anton Du Beke.)				Total	Result
1	Jive / "We Built This City"	3	5	5	5	18	No Elimination
2	American Smooth / "Parklife"	5	5	5	6	21	Safe
4 (Note: Knowles suffered an injury and was unable to compete in Week 3. He was given a bye through to Week 4 and due to the limited training time, allowed to perform the Charleston they were supposed to dance the previous week.)	Charleston / "Rain on the Roof"	4	6	5	6	21	Eliminated
