= List of Strictly Come Dancing specials =

Since the inception of Strictly Come Dancing in 2004, several special editions of the show have been transmitted by the BBC each year. These have included seasonal specials, charity specials, and variations of the Strictly Come Dancing format.

== Christmas Specials ==
The Christmas Specials of Strictly Come Dancing have been aired each year since 2004. Between 2004 and 2009, the specials feature celebrities from the current and past series. Between 2010 and 2013 and 2021 to 2025, the specials featured celebrities who were unable to compete in the main series due to time constrictions. From 2014 to 2019 and 2026 onwards the specials again featured contestants from previous series. With their professional dance partners, the celebrities perform their chosen Ballroom or Latin dance which is scored by the judges. The winning couple is then chosen by a studio audience vote.

Year
Year	Christmas champions	Runners-up
2004	Jill Halfpenny & Darren Bennett	Natasha Kaplinsky & Brendan Cole
2005	Darren Gough & Lilia Kopylova	Zoë Ball & Ian Waite
2006	Colin Jackson & Erin Boag	Zoë Ball & Ian Waite
2007	Darren Gough & Lilia Kopylova	Gethin Jones & Camilla Dallerup
2008	Jill Halfpenny & Darren Bennett	Kelly Brook & Brian Fortuna
2009	Ali Bastian & Brian Fortuna	Rachel Stevens & Vincent Simone
2010	John Barrowman & Kristina Rihanoff	—N/a
2011	Charlie Brooks & Vincent Simone	—N/a
2012	J.B. Gill & Ola Jordan	—N/a
2013	Rufus Hound & Flavia Cacace	—N/a
2014	Louis Smith & Aliona Vilani	—N/a
2015	Harry Judd & Joanne Clifton	—N/a
2016	Melvin Odoom & Janette Manrara	—N/a
2017	Katie Derham & Brendan Cole	—N/a
2018	Aston Merrygold & Janette Manrara	—N/a
2019	Debbie McGee & Kevin Clifton	—N/a
2020	—N/a	—N/a
2021	Anne-Marie & Graziano Di Prima	—N/a
2022	Alexandra Mardell & Kai Widdrington	—N/a
2023	Jamie Borthwick & Nancy Xu	—N/a
2024	Tayce & Kai Widdrington	—N/a
2025	Scarlett Moffatt & Vito Coppola	—N/a

=== 2004 ===
The first Christmas special was broadcast live on 22 December 2004, featuring top couples from both of the first two series (with the exception of Christopher Parker and Julian Clary, who were not able to appear). The special was won by Jill Halfpenny and Darren Bennett.

Individual judges scores in the chart below (given in parentheses) are listed in this order from left to right: Craig Revel Horwood, Arlene Phillips, Len Goodman, Bruno Tonioli.

Celebrity	Position on Strictly	Professional	Judges' scores	Dance
Martin Offiah	Spring 2004 contestant	Erin Boag	26 (6,6,7,7)	Jive
Aled Jones	Autumn 2004 semi-finalist	Lilia Kopylova	30 (7,7,8,8)	Samba
Lesley Garrett	Spring 2004 semi-finalist	Anton du Beke	31 (7,8,8,8)	Waltz
Natasha Kaplinsky	Spring 2004 winner	Brendan Cole	33 (7,8,9,9)	Foxtrot
Denise Lewis	Autumn 2004 runner-up	Ian Waite	37 (9,9,9,10)	Quickstep
Jill Halfpenny	Autumn 2004 winner	Darren Bennett	36 (9,9,9,9)	Jive

=== 2005 ===
The 2005 Christmas special, broadcast on 24 December, featured the top four couples (Darren Gough and Lilia Kopylova, Colin Jackson and Erin Boag, Zoë Ball and Ian Waite, James Martin and Camilla Dallerup) from that year's series competing against two competitors from the US version, Dancing with the Stars, who danced with two professionals from the British series. The two competitors from the US series were Rachel Hunter, who was teamed with Brendan Cole, and Evander Holyfield, who danced with Karen Hardy. Series 2 winner Jill Halfpenny was scheduled to appear with her partner Darren Bennett, but pulled out due to a breakdown in fee negotiations.

Individual judges' scores in the chart below (given in parentheses) are listed in this order from left to right: Craig Revel Horwood, Arlene Phillips, Len Goodman, Bruno Tonioli.

Celebrity	Position on Strictly	Professional	Judges' scores	Dance
Evander Holyfield	Dancing with the Stars 2005 contestant	Karen Hardy	22 (3,5,7,7)	Jive
Rachel Hunter	Dancing with the Stars 2005 contestant	Brendan Cole	36 (9,9,9,9)	Rumba
Zoë Ball	Strictly 2005 third place	Ian Waite	38 (9,9,10,10)	Foxtrot
James Martin	Strictly 2005 fourth place	Camilla Dallerup	37 (8,10,10,9)	Foxtrot
Colin Jackson	Strictly 2005 second place	Erin Boag	35 (9,8,9,9)	Cha-Cha-Cha
Darren Gough	Strictly 2005 winner	Lilia Kopylova	40 (10,10,10,10)	Quickstep

As well as winning the 2005 series, Darren Gough and Lilia Kopylova won this Christmas Special after receiving the full 40 marks from the judges.

=== 2006 ===
The 2006 Christmas special featured stars from the third and fourth series of Strictly going head to head to perform their highest-scoring dances. The theme of the special was black and white, with all the dancers dressed in white gowns, black dresses and top hats and tails.

It was a pre-recorded show shown on Christmas Day on BBC One.

Individual judges scores in the chart below (given in parentheses) are listed in this order from left to right: Craig Revel Horwood, Arlene Phillips, Len Goodman, Bruno Tonioli.

Celebrity	Position on Strictly	Professional	Judges' scores	Dance
Louisa Lytton	2006 quarter-finalist	Vincent Simone	36 (9,9,9,9)	Jive
Mark Ramprakash	2006 winner	Karen Hardy	36 (9,9,9,9)	Salsa
Emma Bunton	2006 third place	Darren Bennett	36 (9,9,9,9)	Samba
Matt Dawson	2006 runner-up	Lilia Kopylova	37 (9,9,10,9)	Waltz
Zoë Ball	2005 third place	Ian Waite	38 (9,10,9,10)	Rumba
Colin Jackson	2005 runner-up	Erin Boag	40 (10,10,10,10)	Quickstep

After the combined scores of the judges' marks and the votes of the studio audience, Colin Jackson and Erin Boag won the competition after getting the full 40 marks from the judges, with Zoë Ball and Ian Waite as runners up. The final places of the bottom four couples were not announced — they were eliminated from the competition in random order.

=== 2007 ===
The 2007 Christmas special featured the top four couples from series five (Alesha Dixon, Matt Di Angelo, Gethin Jones and Letitia Dean), as well as Darren Gough and Mark Ramprakash (champions of series three and four respectively). The winner was series three champion Darren Gough, who received a perfect 40 for his American Smooth and had the highest score overall when the judges' scores were combined with the studio audience vote. Series five semi-finalist Gethin Jones, who also received a perfect 40 for his waltz, was runner-up. The final placing of the bottom four couples was not announced.

It was broadcast on BBC One on Christmas Day (25 December 2007).

Individual judges scores in the chart below (given in parentheses) are listed in this order from left to right: Craig Revel Horwood, Arlene Phillips, Len Goodman, Bruno Tonioli.

Celebrity	Position on Strictly	Professional	Judges' scores	Dance
Alesha Dixon	2007 winner	Matthew Cutler	36 (9,9,9,9)	Cha-Cha-Cha
Letitia Dean	2007 quarter-finalist	Darren Bennett	36 (9,9,9,9)	Foxtrot
Mark Ramprakash	2006 winner	Karen Hardy	38 (9,9,10,10)	Jive
Matt Di Angelo	2007 runner-up	Flavia Cacace	39 (9,10,10,10)	Rumba
Gethin Jones	2007 third place	Camilla Dallerup	40 (10,10,10,10)	Waltz
Darren Gough	2005 winner	Lilia Kopylova	40 (10,10,10,10)	American Smooth

Darren Gough won his third Strictly trophy after winning series 3 and two Christmas specials — he and Jill Halfpenny are the only contestants on Strictly to do this.

=== 2008 ===
The 2008 Christmas special aired on 25 December 2008. Tom Chambers, Rachel Stevens and Lisa Snowdon took on former contestants Jill Halfpenny, Alesha Dixon and Kelly Brook. Brian Fortuna partnered Brook due to her original partner, Brendan Cole, dancing with his more recent partner, Lisa Snowdon. Russell Watson made a special guest appearance. The celebrities, their professional partners and their dances were announced on 17 December 2008.

Due to four couples coming top of the leaderboard with 39 points, head judge Len Goodman was given the casting vote to break the tie. Therefore, points from the judges were awarded as follows before the audience vote: Alesha — 6, Jill — 5, Rachel — 4, Kelly — 3, Tom — 2, Lisa — 1. After the audience vote, Halfpenny was named the 2008 Christmas Champion with Brook in second place, meaning that Halfpenny joined Darren Gough in having won two Christmas specials, and her partner Darren Bennett equalled his professional partner and wife Lilia Kopylova's two Christmas special victories.

Individual judges scores in the chart below (given in parentheses) are listed in this order from left to right: Craig Revel Horwood, Arlene Phillips, Len Goodman, Bruno Tonioli.

Celebrity	Position on Strictly	Professional	Judges' scores	Dance	Song
Lisa Snowdon	2008 third place	Brendan Cole	36 (8,9,9,10)	Quickstep	"Sleigh Ride"
Tom Chambers	2008 winner	Camilla Dallerup	37 (9,10,9,9)	Foxtrot	"Rudolph the Red-Nosed Reindeer"
Rachel Stevens	2008 runner-up	Vincent Simone	39 (9,10,10,10)	Rumba	"2 Become 1"
Alesha Dixon	2007 winner	Matthew Cutler	39 (9,10,10,10)	Viennese Waltz	"White Christmas"
Kelly Brook	2007 contestant	Brian Fortuna	39 (10,9,10,10)	Jive	"Rockin' Around the Christmas Tree"
Jill Halfpenny	Autumn 2004 winner	Darren Bennett	39 (9,10,10,10)	American Smooth	"My Favourite Things"

=== 2009 ===
The 2009 Christmas special aired on 25 December 2009. It featured the top three contestants from series 7 along with former contestants Gethin Jones, Rachel Stevens and Austin Healey. Craig Revel Horwood, Len Goodman, Alesha Dixon and Bruno Tonioli provided the judging. After the audience vote, Ali Bastian and Brian Fortuna were declared champions. Rachel Stevens and Vincent Simone were runners-up.

Individual judges scores in the chart below (given in parentheses) are listed in this order from left to right: Craig Revel Horwood, Len Goodman, Alesha Dixon, Bruno Tonioli.

Celebrity	Position on Strictly	Professional	Judges' scores	Dance	Song
Chris Hollins	Series 7 winner	Ola Jordan	33 (8,8,9,8)	Foxtrot	"Santa Baby"
Austin Healey	Series 6 fourth place	Erin Boag	36 (9,9,9,9)	Paso Doble	"Bohemian Rhapsody"
Ricky Whittle	Series 7 second place	Natalie Lowe	36 (8,9,10,9)	Quickstep	"Jingle Bells"
Gethin Jones	Series 5 third place	Flavia Cacace	38 (9,10,9,10)	American Smooth	"Baby, It's Cold Outside"
Rachel Stevens	Series 6 second place	Vincent Simone	39 (10,10,9,10)	Rumba	"Miss You Most (At Christmas)"
Ali Bastian	Series 7 third place	Brian Fortuna	40 (10,10,10,10)	Viennese Waltz	"Please Come Home For Christmas"

=== 2010 ===
Winner

The 2010 Christmas Special aired on 25 December 2010. That special, instead of having celebrities from previous years, had five new celebrities who didn't have time to do the full show.

Individual judges scores in the chart below (given in parentheses) are listed in this order from left to right: Craig Revel Horwood, Len Goodman, Alesha Dixon, Bruno Tonioli.

Celebrity	Occupation	Professional	Judges' scores	Dance	Song
John Barrowman	Actor & singer	Kristina Rihanoff	37 (9,9,9,10)	Quickstep	"Sleigh Ride"
Vince Cable	Politician	Erin Boag	36 (9,10,8,9)	Foxtrot	"Winter Wonderland"
Ronni Ancona	Actress & impressionist	Anton du Beke	28 (6,8,7,7)	Viennese Waltz	"It's the Most Wonderful Time of the Year"
Fern Britton	Television presenter	Matthew Cutler	30 (7,8,7,8)	Jive	"Step into Christmas"
June Brown	EastEnders actress	Vincent Simone	28 (6,7,8,7)	Tango	"Never Do a Tango With an Eskimo"

Fern Britton would reappear as part of the main series in Series 10.

=== 2011 ===
Winner

The full lineup of the 2011 Christmas special, once again featuring five new celebrities who could not commit to the full series, was announced on 23 November 2011.

Individual judges scores in the chart below (given in parentheses) are listed in this order from left to right: Craig Revel Horwood, Len Goodman, Alesha Dixon, Bruno Tonioli.

Celebrity	Occupation	Professional	Judges' scores	Dance	Song
Barry McGuigan	Retired professional boxer	Erin Boag	36 (8,9,10,9)	Quickstep	"Jingle Bells"
Su Pollard	Comedy actress	Anton du Beke	30 (6,9,7,8)	Foxtrot	"White Christmas"
Simon Webbe	Blue singer	Katya Virshilas	36 (9,9,9,9)	Cha Cha Cha	"Merry Xmas Everybody"
Debra Stephenson	Actress & impressionist	Ian Waite	37 (8,9,10,10)	American Smooth	"Baby, It's Cold Outside"
Charlie Brooks	EastEnders actress	Vincent Simone	37 (9,9,9,10)	Jive	"Santa Claus Is Coming to Town"

Simon Webbe would reappear as part of the main series in Series 12.

=== 2012 ===
Winner

The full lineup of the 2012 Christmas special, featuring six new celebrities who could not commit to the full series, was announced on 28 November 2012.

Individual judges scores in the chart below (given in parentheses) are listed in this order from left to right: Craig Revel Horwood, Darcey Bussell, Len Goodman, Bruno Tonioli.

Celebrity	Occupation	Professional	Judges' scores	Dance	Song
J.B. Gill	JLS singer	Ola Jordan	39 (9,10,10,10)	Jive	"Rockin' Robin"
Bobby Ball	Cannon and Ball comedian & actor	Katya Virshilas	29 (6,7,8,8)	American Smooth	"White Christmas"
Sheila Hancock	Stage & screen actress	Ian Waite	36 (8,8,10,10)	Foxtrot	"Have Yourself a Merry Little Christmas"
Fabrice Muamba	Retired footballer	Aliona Vilani	35 (8,9,9,9)	Salsa	"Christmas Wrapping"
Katy Brand	Comedian	Anton du Beke	33 (7,8,9,9)	Viennese Waltz	"It's the Most Wonderful Time of the Year"
Helen Skelton	Blue Peter presenter	Artem Chigvintsev	37 (8,9,10,10)	Jive	"All I Want for Christmas Is You"

A musical interlude was provided by the popular singer Rod Stewart.

As a new addition to the Christmas specials, a "Strictly Allstar" group of seven previous contestants from the show returned for a group dance, and appearances from Ann Widdecombe and Russell Grant were also in the programme.

Celebrity	Position on Strictly	Professional
Kelly Brook	Series 5 contestant	Brendan Cole
Tom Chambers	Series 6 winner	Kristina Rihanoff
Chelsee Healey	Series 9 runner-up	Pasha Kovalev
Chris Hollins	Series 7 winner	Ola Jordan
Colin Jackson	Series 3 runner-up	Erin Boag
Natasha Kaplinsky	Series 1 winner	Ian Waite
Rachel Stevens	Series 6 runner-up	Vincent Simone

Helen Skelton would reappear as part of the main series in Series 20.

JB Gill would reappear as part of the main series in Series 22.

=== 2013 ===
Winner

The full lineup of the 2013 Christmas special, featuring six new celebrities who could not commit to the full series, was announced on 25 November 2013.

Individual judges scores in the chart below (given in parentheses) are listed in this order from left to right: Craig Revel Horwood, Darcey Bussell, Len Goodman, Bruno Tonioli.

Celebrity	Occupation	Professional	Judges' scores	Dance	Song
Ricky Norwood	EastEnders actor	Janette Manrara	33 (8,8,8,9)	Quickstep	"Merry Christmas Everyone"
Elaine Paige	West End singer & actress	Pasha Kovalev	39 (10,10,9,10)	Cha-Cha-Cha	"Jingle Bells"
Sara Cox	Television & radio presenter	Robin Windsor	33 (7,8,9,9)	Waltz	"Silent Night"
Rochelle Humes	The Saturdays singer	Ian Waite	31 (7,8,8,8)	Salsa	"Santa Claus Is Coming to Town"
Matt Goss	Singer-songwriter	Aliona Vilani	35 (8,9,9,9)	American Smooth	"Winter Wonderland"
Rufus Hound	Comedian	Flavia Cacace	38 (9,10,9,10)	Tango	"Never Do a Tango With an Eskimo"

Matt Goss would reappear as part of the main series in Series 20.

=== 2014 ===
Winner

The full lineup of the 2014 Christmas special, featuring six returning contestants in a change to recent tradition, was announced on 13 November 2014. Bruce Forsyth returned to host alongside Tess Daly, having retired from the main series from 2014.

Most of the celebrities were given new partners, with the exception of Lisa Riley, who was reunited with her original dance partner, Robin Windsor. This year's special had a pantomime theme, with each couple, as well as the judges, dressed as characters from a different classic pantomime.

Individual judges scores in the chart below (given in parentheses) are listed in this order from left to right: Craig Revel Horwood, Darcey Bussell, Len Goodman, Bruno Tonioli.

Celebrity	Position on Strictly	Professional	Judges' scores	Dance	Song	Pantomime
Chris Hollins	Series 7 champion	Iveta Lukošiūtė	31 (7,8,8,8)	Charleston	"Sleigh Ride"	Dick Whittington
Rachel Stevens	Series 6 runner-up	Tristan MacManus	38 (9,9,10,10)	Viennese Waltz	"Please Come Home for Christmas"	Peter Pan
Russell Grant	Series 9 contestant	Joanne Clifton	29 (7,8,7,7)	Cha-Cha-Cha	"Could It Be Magic"	Aladdin
Sophie Ellis-Bextor	Series 11 finalist	Aljaž Škorjanec	39 (9,10,10,10)	American Smooth	"White Christmas"	Sleeping Beauty
Lisa Riley	Series 10 semi-finalist	Robin Windsor	32 (8,8,8,8)	Jive	"Step into Christmas"	The Wizard Of Oz
Louis Smith	Series 10 winner	Aliona Vilani	40 (10,10,10,10)	Quickstep	"Jingle Bells"	Jack and the Beanstalk

=== 2015 ===
Winner

The full lineup of the 2015 Christmas special, featuring six returning contestants, was announced on 19 November 2015. This year's special, like the previous year, had a panto theme. The special was presented by Tess Daly and Claudia Winkleman; Forsyth was unable to host as planned, but appeared via a video message.

Individual judges scores in the chart below (given in parentheses) are listed in this order from left to right: Craig Revel Horwood, Darcey Bussell, Len Goodman, Bruno Tonioli.

Celebrity	Position on Strictly	Professional	Judges' scores	Dance	Song	Pantomime
Lisa Snowdon	Series 6 finalist	Pasha Kovalev	37 (9,9,9,10)	Quickstep	"Let It Snow"	Alice in Wonderland
Alison Hammond	Series 12 contestant	Robin Windsor	31 (7,8,8,8)	Cha-Cha-Cha	"Celebration"	Hansel and Gretel
Cassidy Little	The People's Strictly winner	Natalie Lowe	35 (8,9,9,9)	Jive	"Cool Yule"	Puss in Boots
Abbey Clancy	Series 11 winner	Brendan Cole	39 (9,10,10,10)	Waltz	"When I Fall in Love"	Rapunzel
Harry Judd	Series 9 winner	Joanne Clifton	40 (10,10,10,10)	American Smooth	"Baby, It's Cold Outside"	Jack Frost
Tom Chambers	Series 6 winner	Oti Mabuse	40 (10,10,10,10)	Charleston	"Santa Claus Is Coming to Town"	Scrooge

=== 2016 ===
Winner

The celebrity lineup of the 2016 Christmas special, featuring six returning contestants, was announced on 7 November 2016. The professional dancers taking part were revealed on 11 November 2016. Each routine had a Christmas movie theme. This year marked the first time a contestant who wasn't one of the final three on Strictly won the Christmas special.

Individual judges scores in the chart below (given in parentheses) are listed in this order from left to right: Craig Revel Horwood, Darcey Bussell, Len Goodman, Bruno Tonioli.

Celebrity	Position on Strictly	Professional	Judges' scores	Dance	Song	Christmas film
Ainsley Harriott	Series 13 contestant	Karen Clifton	35 (7,9,10,9)	Jive	"Rockin' Around the Christmas Tree"	Home Alone
Gethin Jones	Series 5 third place	Chloe Hewitt	38 (9,9,10,10)	Quickstep	"The Polar Express"	The Polar Express
Pamela Stephenson	Series 8 third place	Pasha Kovalev	39 (9,10,10,10)	Cha-Cha-Cha	"Jump (for My Love)"	Love Actually
Denise Lewis	Series 2 runner-up	Anton Du Beke	38 (9,9,10,10)	Viennese Waltz	"Meet Me in St. Louis, Louis"	Meet Me in St. Louis
Melvin Odoom	Series 14 last place	Janette Manrara	40 (10,10,10,10)	Charleston	"Sparklejollytwinklejingley"	Elf
Frankie Bridge	Series 12 runner-up	Gorka Márquez	40 (10,10,10,10)	American Smooth	"Let It Go"	Frozen

=== 2017 ===
Winner

The full lineup of the 2017 Christmas special, featuring six returning contestants, was announced on 6 November 2017.

Individual judges scores in the chart below (given in parentheses) are listed in this order from left to right: Craig Revel Horwood, Darcey Bussell, Shirley Ballas, Bruno Tonioli.

Celebrity	Position on Strictly	Professional	Judges' scores	Dance	Song
Robbie Savage	Series 9 quarter-finalist	Dianne Buswell	31 (7,8,8,8)	American Smooth	"Christmas (Baby Please Come Home)"
Judy Murray	Series 12 contestant	Neil Jones	31 (7,8,8,8)	Charleston	"Let's Misbehave"
Colin Jackson	Series 3 runner-up	Amy Dowden	36 (9,9,9,9)	Rumba	"Run"
Jeremy Vine	Series 13 contestant	Karen Clifton	31 (7,8,8,8)	Quickstep	"All I Want for Christmas Is You"
Katie Derham	Series 13 finalist	Brendan Cole	37 (9,10,9,9)	Viennese Waltz	"White Christmas"
Kimberley Walsh	Series 10 runner-up	Pasha Kovalev	39 (9,10,10,10)	Jive	"Run Rudolph Run"

=== 2018 ===
Winner

The full lineup for the 2018 Christmas special was announced on 5 November 2018. The routines were inspired by fairytales and Christmas stories.

Individual judges scores in the chart below (given in parentheses) are listed in this order from left to right: Craig Revel Horwood, Darcey Bussell, Shirley Ballas, Bruno Tonioli.

Celebrity	Position on Strictly	Professional	Judges' scores	Dance	Song	Fairytale
Anita Rani	Series 13 semi-finalist	Neil Jones	35 (8,9,9,9)	Foxtrot	"Winter Wonderland"	The Snowman
Aston Merrygold	Series 15 contestant	Janette Manrara	40 (10,10,10,10)	Jive	"What Christmas Means to Me"	The Nutcracker
Ann Widdecombe	Series 8 quarter-finalist	Anton du Beke	22 (2,6,7,7)	American Smooth	"Sisters"	Cinderella
Michael Vaughan	Series 10 contestant	Nadiya Bychkova	30 (6,8,8,8)	Viennese Waltz	"Please Come Home for Christmas"	Peter Pan
Jake Wood	Series 12 semi-finalist	Luba Mushtuk	39 (9,10,10,10)	Cha-Cha-Cha	"Could It Be Magic"	The Frog Prince
Caroline Flack	Series 12 champion	Gorka Márquez	40 (10,10,10,10)	Charleston	"Santa Claus Is Coming to Town"	Pinocchio

=== 2019 ===
Winner

The celebrities taking part in the 2019 Christmas special was announced on 5 November. Their Professional Partners were announced the following week.

Individual judges scores in the chart below (given in parentheses) are listed in this order from left to right: Craig Revel Horwood, Motsi Mabuse, Shirley Ballas, Bruno Tonioli.

Celebrity	Previous position on Strictly	Professional	Judges' scores	Dance	Song
Gemma Atkinson	Series 15 runner-up	Gorka Márquez	35 (8,9,9,9)	Jive	"I Saw Mommy Kissing Santa Claus"
Mark Wright	Series 12 finalist	Janette Manrara	35 (8,9,9,9)	Salsa	"Christmas Wrapping"
Chizzy Akudolu	Series 15 contestant	Graziano Di Prima	36 (9,9,9,9)	Cha-Cha-Cha	"Get the Party Started"
Richard Arnold	Series 10 contestant	Luba Mushtuk	32 (8,8,8,8)	Foxtrot	"You're a Mean One Mr Grinch"
Joe Sugg	Series 16 runner-up	Dianne Buswell	40 (10,10,10,10)	Street/Commercial	"Sleigh Ride"
Debbie McGee	Series 15 runner-up	Kevin Clifton	40 (10,10,10,10)	Quickstep	"Jingle Bells"

=== 2020 ===
Due to the COVID-19 pandemic, no competition was able to take place. Instead, a countdown of the top 25 most memorable dances in Strictly history took place; the 25 dances were selected by a panel before being ranked by the public vote. 2015 champions Jay McGuinness and Aliona Vilani's Week 3 Jive was voted the most memorable dance, with Danny Mac and Oti Mabuse's 2016 Samba finishing second. The Top 25 dances are as follows:

Rank	Dance
25	Ashley Roberts & Pasha Kovalev's Jive to "Shake a Tail Feather" (Series 16, Week 9)
24	Frankie Bridge & Kevin Clifton's Paso Doble to "America" (Series 12, Week 3)
23	Debbie McGee & Giovanni Pernice's Salsa to "Can't Take My Eyes Off You" (Series 15, Week 8)
22	Alexandra Burke & Gorka Márquez's Jive to "Proud Mary" (Series 15, Week 4)
21	Alesha Dixon & Matthew Cutler's Cha-Cha-Cha to "Crazy in Love" (Series 5, Week 8)
20	Aston Merrygold & Janette Manrara's Cha-Cha-Cha to "Can't Stop the Feeling!"(Series 15, Week 3)
19	Simon Webbe & Kristina Rihanoff's Argentine Tango to "El Tango de Roxanne" (Series 12, Week 8)
18	Abbey Clancy & Aljaž Skorjanec's Waltz to "Kissing You" (Series 11, Week 1)
17	Ann Widdecombe & Anton Du Beke's Samba to "Heaven Must Be Missing an Angel" (Series 8, Week 8)
16	Jake Wood & Janette Manrara's Salsa to "Mambo No. 5" (Series 12, Week 2)
15	Louis Smith & Flavia Cacace's Salsa to "(I've Had) The Time of My Life" (Series 10, Week 3)
14	Ore Oduba & Joanne Clifton's Jive to "Runaway Baby" (Series 14, Week 4)
13	Chris Hollins & Ola Jordan's Charleston to "Fat Sam's Grand Slam" (Series 7, Week 11)
12	Tom Chambers & Camilla Dallerup's Showdance to "If My Friends Could See Me Now" (Series 6, Week 14)
11	Mark Ramprakash & Karen Hardy's Salsa to "Hot Hot Hot" (Series 4, Week 5)
10	Ore Oduba & Joanne Clifton's American Smooth to "Singin' in the Rain" (Series 14, Week 3)
9	Faye Tozer & Giovanni Pernice's Charleston to "The Lonely Goatherd" (Series 16, Week 11)
8	Caroline Flack & Pasha Kovalev's Showdance to "Angels" (Series 12, Week 13)
7	Karim Zeroual & Amy Dowden's Jive to "You Can't Stop the Beat" (Series 17, Week 11)
6	Jill Halfpenny & Darren Bennett's Jive to "I'm Still Standing" (Series 2, Week 3)
5	Caroline Flack & Pasha Kovalev's Charleston to "Istanbul (Not Constantinople)" (Series 12, Week 10)
4	Ed Balls & Katya Jones's Salsa to "Gangnam Style" (Series 14, Week 8)
3	Kelvin Fletcher & Oti Mabuse's Samba to "La Vida Es Un Carnaval" (Series 17, Week 1)
2	Danny Mac & Oti Mabuse's Samba to "Magalenha" (Series 14, Week 10)
1	Jay McGuinness & Aliona Vilani's Jive to "You Never Can Tell/Misirlou" (Series 13, Week 3)

=== 2021 ===
Winner

The full lineup competing in the 2021 Christmas special was announced on 26 November 2021, featuring six new celebrities for the first time since 2013. The episode was aired on 25 December, with Anne-Marie and Graziano Di Prima as winners.

Individual judges scores in the chart below (given in parentheses) are listed in this order from left to right: Craig Revel Horwood, Motsi Mabuse, Shirley Ballas, Anton Du Beke.

Celebrity	Occupation	Professional	Judges' scores	Dance	Song
Fred Sirieix	First Dates maître d'hôtel	Dianne Buswell	38 (8,10,10,10)	Quickstep	"Merry Christmas Everyone"
Moira Stuart	Newsreader & broadcaster	Aljaž Škorjanec	33 (8,8,8,9)	Salsa	"Santa Claus Is Coming to Town"
Anne-Marie	Singer-songwriter	Graziano Di Prima	40 (10,10,10,10)	Cha-Cha-Cha	"Feliz Navidad"
Jay Blades	The Repair Shop presenter	Luba Mushtuk	34 (8,8,9,9)	Jive	"Only Fools and Horses"/"Hooky Street"
Adrian Chiles	Television & radio presenter	Jowita Przystał	33 (7,8,9,9)	American Smooth	"White Christmas"
Mel Giedroyc	Comedian, actress & television presenter	Neil Jones	40 (10,10,10,10)	Street/Commercial	"Ice Ice Baby"

=== 2022 ===
Winner

The full lineup competing in the 2022 Christmas special was announced on 17 November 2022. The episode was aired on 25 December, with Alexandra Mardell and Kai Widdrington as winners.

Individual judges scores in the chart below (given in parentheses) are listed in this order from left to right: Craig Revel Horwood, Motsi Mabuse, Shirley Ballas, Anton Du Beke.

Celebrity	Occupation	Professional	Judges' scores	Dance	Song
Rickie Haywood-Williams	Television & radio presenter	Luba Mushtuk	34 (8,8,9,9)	Salsa	"Christmas Wrapping"
Larry Lamb	Stage & screen actor	Nadiya Bychkova	31 (7,7,8,9)	American Smooth	"Winter Wonderland"
Rosie Ramsey	Podcaster, author & television presenter	Neil Jones	39 (9,10,10,10)	Jive	"Step into Christmas"
George Webster	CBeebies presenter	Amy Dowden	38 (8,10,10,10)	Charleston	"Good News"
Nicola Roberts	Former Girls Aloud singer	Giovanni Pernice	39 (9,10,10,10)	Waltz	"Silent Night"
Alexandra Mardell	Former Coronation Street actress	Kai Widdrington	40 (10,10,10,10)	Quickstep	"Sleigh Ride"

=== 2023 ===
Winner

Individual judges scores in the chart below (given in parentheses) are listed in this order from left to right: Craig Revel Horwood, Motsi Mabuse, Shirley Ballas, Anton Du Beke.

Dan Snow, Sally Nugent and Jamie Borthwick were announced as the first three celebrities competing in the 2023 Christmas Special on 22 November 2023 on Strictly Come Dancing: It Takes Two. The full line-up was confirmed the following day on 23 November, when the final three celebrities were revealed as Tillie Amartey, Danny Cipriani and Keisha Buchanan on It Takes Two. The episode was aired on 25 December, with Jamie Borthwick and Nancy Xu as winners.

Celebrity	Occupation	Professional	Judges' scores	Dance	Song
Dan Snow	Historian & television presenter	Nadiya Bychkova	30 (7,7,7,9)	Jive	"All I Want for Christmas Is You"
Keisha Buchanan	Sugababes singer	Gorka Márquez	33 (8,8,8,9)	Viennese Waltz	"Snowman"
Danny Cipriani	Former England rugby player	Jowita Przystał	37 (9,9,9,10)	Cha-Cha-Cha	"Celebration"
Tillie Amartey	Actress & television presenter	Neil Jones	39 (9,10,10,10)	Jive	"Underneath the Tree"
Sally Nugent	BBC Breakfast presenter	Graziano Di Prima	38 (9,9,10,10)	Foxtrot	"Have Yourself a Merry Little Christmas"
Jamie Borthwick	EastEnders actor	Nancy Xu	40 (10,10,10,10)	Quickstep	"Merry Christmas Everyone"

Jamie Borthwick would reappear as part of the main series in Series 22.

=== 2024 ===
Winner

Individual judges scores in the chart below (given in parentheses) are listed in this order from left to right: Craig Revel Horwood, Motsi Mabuse, Shirley Ballas, Anton Du Beke.

Josh Widdicombe was announced as the first celebrity competing in the 2024 Christmas Special on 11 November 2024 on Strictly Come Dancing: It Takes Two. The following day, Tayce was announced as the second contestant. She is the first drag artist to appear on the show. Celebrities continued to be revealed throughout the following week before the line-up was concluded on 21 November 2024. Vogue Williams was originally partnered with Carlos Gu, however was re-partnered with Gorka Márquez, after the former was forced to withdraw due to injury. The episode was aired on 25 December, with Tayce and Kai Widdrington as winners.

- Musical guest: Emma Bunton—"2 Become 1"

Celebrity	Occupation	Professional	Judges' scores	Dance	Song
Harry Aikines-Aryeetey	Olympic sprinter & Gladiators star	Nancy Xu	37 (8,10,9,10)	Street/Commercial	"Christmas Wrapping"
Tamzin Outhwaite	Stage & screen actress	Nikita Kuzmin	37 (9,9,9,10)	Viennese Waltz	"Hallelujah"
Vogue Williams	Model & media personality	Gorka Márquez	33 (8,8,8,9)	Jive	"Rockin' Robin"
Billy Monger	Racing driver & television presenter	Nadiya Bychkova	32 (7,8,8,9)	American Smooth	"Merry Christmas"
Josh Widdicombe	Comedian & presenter	Karen Hauer	36 (8,9,9,10)	Charleston	"Let It Snow"
Tayce	Drag queen & RuPaul's Drag Race UK finalist	Kai Widdrington	40 (10,10,10,10)	Cha-Cha-Cha	"100 Degrees"

Harry Aikines-Aryeetey would reappear as part of the main series in Series 23. Josh Widdicombe would also reappear in the main series as new co host of the show along with Emma Willis and Johannes Radebe, replacing Tess Daly and Claudia Winkleman.

=== 2025 ===
Winner

Individual judges scores in the chart below (given in parentheses) are listed in this order from left to right: Craig Revel Horwood, Motsi Mabuse, Shirley Ballas, Anton Du Beke.

Scarlett Moffatt announced herself as the first celebrity competing in the 2025 Christmas Special on 21 November 2025 on Strictly Come Dancing: It Takes Two. Celebrities continued to be revealed throughout the following week before the line-up was concluded on 26 November 2025. The episode was aired on 25 December, with Scarlett Moffatt and Vito Coppola as winners.

- Musical guests: Blue — "One Love"

Celebrity	Occupation	Professional	Judges' scores	Dance	Song
Babatunde Aléshé	Actor & comedian	Nancy Xu	35 (8,9,9,9)	Charleston	"Santa Claus Is Comin' to Town"
Melanie Blatt	Former All Saints singer	Kai Widdrington	36 (8,9,10,9)	Theatre/Jazz	"Santa Baby"
Brian McFadden	Former Westlife singer	Michelle Tsiakkas	39 (9,10,10,10)	Jive	"Run Rudolph Run"
Jodie Ounsley	Former rugby union player & Gladiators star	Neil Jones	37 (9,10,9,9)	Street/Commercial	"Red Christmas"
Nicholas Bailey	EastEnders actor	Luba Mushtuk	39 (9,10,10,10)	Viennese Waltz	"It's the Most Wonderful Time of the Year"
Scarlett Moffatt	Television personality & presenter	Vito Coppola	40 (10,10,10,10)	Cha-Cha-Cha	"DJ Play a Christmas Song"

=== 2026 ===
Winner

Individual judges scores in the chart below (given in parentheses) are listed in this order from left to right: Craig Revel Horwood, Motsi Mabuse, Shirley Ballas, Anton Du Beke.

Angela Rippon and Ashley Roberts were announced as the first two celebrities competing in the 2026 Christmas Special on 16 November 2026 on Strictly Come Dancing: It Takes Two. Kimberley Walsh and Lewis Cope were announced on 18 November 2026.

Celebrity	Position on Strictly	Professional	Judges' scores	Dance	Song
Angela Rippon	Series 21 contestant	Neil Jones			
Ashley Roberts	Series 16 runner-up	Julian Caillon			
Kimberley Walsh	Series 10 runner-up	Cristian Priori			
Lewis Cope	Series 23 contestant	Lethabo Monametsi			

=== Ratings ===
All ratings are provided by BARB.

Edition	Date	Official rating (millions)	Weekly rank for BBC One	Weekly rank for all UK TV
2004	22 December	9.00	10	20
2004 Results	22 December	9.23	9	19
2005	24 December	9.33	7	13
2006	25 December	7.83	12	19
2007	25 December	8.62	9	15
2008	25 December	9.46	7	9
2009	25 December	7.57	11	15
2010	25 December	10.96	7	8
2011	25 December	8.50	9	12
2012	25 December	9.17	11	11
2013	25 December	8.84	7	7
2014	25 December	8.98	3	3
2015	25 December	8.54	5	6
2016	25 December	8.94	3	3
2017	25 December	8.28	4	6
2018	25 December	7.56	4	6
2019	25 December	7.68	3	3
2020	25 December	6.77	5	6
2021	25 December	7.34	4	4
2022	25 December	6.91	4	4
2023	25 December	6.60	8	8
2024	25 December	5.36	10	10
2025	25 December	5.44	6	6

== Sport Relief Does Strictly Come Dancing ==
=== 2008 ===
A Strictly Come Dancing one-off special for Sport Relief was broadcast on 14 March 2008, with Craig Revel Horwood, Arlene Phillips and Len Goodman judging. Five former Strictly contestants related to sport partnered a new celebrity. Jade Johnson and Kara Tointon were contestants on the main show in 2009 and 2010, with Johnson leaving after an injury, and Tointon winning the 2010 title. Their partners on their series were Ian Waite and Artem Chigvintsev.

The results were as follows:

Individual judges scores in the chart below (given in parentheses) are listed in this order from left to right: Craig Revel Horwood, Arlene Phillips, Len Goodman.

Contestant	Celebrity	Judges' scores	Dance
Denise Lewis	David Ginola	21 (7,7,7)	Waltz
Roger Black	Jade Johnson	22 (8,6,8)	Cha Cha Cha
Darren Gough	Gemma Bissix	22 (7,7,8)	American Smooth
Matt Dawson	Elaine Paige	25 (8,9,8)	Tango
Mark Ramprakash	Kara Tointon	27 (9,9,9)	Samba

The ranking of the bottom three couples was not announced – they were eliminated from the competition in random order.

A BBC spokesperson commented: "Sport Relief features Strictly Come Dancing with a difference."

=== 2010 ===
Individual judges scores in the chart below (given in parentheses) are listed in this order from left to right: Craig Revel Horwood, Len Goodman, Bruno Tonioli.

Celebrity	Professional	Judges' scores	Dance
Peter Jones	Natalie Lowe	16 (4,7,5)	Tango
Duncan Bannatyne	Lilia Kopylova	10 (2,5,3)	Cha Cha Cha

=== 2012 ===
Strictly Come Dancing did an underwater special for Sport Relief 2012. The contestants were 2011 champion Harry Judd and runner-up Chelsee Healey. The judges were Len Goodman, Craig Revel Horwood, Bruno Tonioli and Mark Foster. It was presented by Claudia Winkleman.

Individual judges scores in the chart below (given in parentheses) are listed in this order from left to right: Craig Revel Horwood, Len Goodman, Mark Foster, Bruno Tonioli.

Celebrity	Professional	Judges' scores
Harry Judd	Aliona Vilani	35 (9,8,8,10)
Chelsee Healey	Pasha Kovalev	35 (8,8,9,10)

After the initial scores resulted in a draw, head judge Len had the deciding vote. He chose Chelsee and Pasha, who won the contest.

=== 2014 ===
Strictly Come Dancing did a Paralympians special for Sport Relief 2014. The contestants were David Clarke, Hannah Cockroft, Nathan Stephens and Martine Wright. The judges were Goodman, Tonioli, Darcey Bussell and Lee Pearson; however, no scores were given. The series was presented by Tess Daly.

Celebrity	Professional
David Clarke	Karen Hauer
Hannah Cockroft	Pasha Kovalev
Nathan Stephens	Iveta Lukošiūtė
Martine Wright	Ian Waite

=== 2018 ===
Strictly Come Dancing did a footballers special for Sport Relief, which aired on 23 March 2018. The special was presented by Ore Oduba, and the judges were Horwood, Bussell, and Tonioli; however, no scores were given. The contestants were Alex Scott, Chris Kamara and David Ginola. Alex Scott, the winner of this special, was later a quarter-finalist in Series 17.

Celebrity	Professional
David Ginola	Karen Clifton
Chris Kamara	Anya Garnis
Alex Scott	Pasha Kovalev

== Children in Need ==
=== 2008 ===
A Strictly Come Dancing one-off special for Children in Need was broadcast on 14 November 2008, with Fearne Cotton presenting and Len Goodman, Bruno Tonioli, Arlene Phillips and Craig Revel Horwood judging.

The results were as follows:

Individual judges scores in the chart below (given in parentheses) are listed in this order from left to right: Craig Revel Horwood, Arlene Phillips, Len Goodman, Bruno Tonioli.

Children in Need host	Professional	Judges' scores	Dance
Tess Daly	Anton du Beke	36 (9,9,9,9)	American Smooth
Terry Wogan	Flavia Cacace	29 (7,8,7,7)	Waltz

=== 2009 ===
The dancers performed alongside Alesha Dixon singing "The Boy Does Nothing" at the start of the show and also Ricky Whittle was seen backstage, supporting the Hollyoaks cast who performed and Alesha told him to go back to rehearsals. The presenters and judges did not appear in this unlike the previous year when judges rated Terry's performance.

=== 2010 ===
A Strictly Come Dancing one-off special for Children in Need was broadcast on 19 November 2010, with Tess Daly presenting the show and Craig Revel Horwood, Len Goodman, Terry Wogan and Pudsey Bear judging. Harry Judd went on to win the ninth series of the show in 2011.

The results were as follows:

Individual judges scores in the chart below (given in parentheses) are listed in this order from left to right: Craig Revel Horwood, Len Goodman, Terry Wogan, Pudsey Bear.

Pop star	Professional	Judges' scores	Dance	Music
Harry Judd	Ola Jordan	35 (9,9,7,10)	Paso Doble	"Ego"—The Saturdays
Rochelle Wiseman	Ian Waite	33 (6,9,8,10)	American Smooth	"All About You"—McFly

=== 2011 ===
In November 2011, BBC newsreaders Sian Williams, Sophie Raworth, Susanna Reid and Emily Maitlis performed a group dance to Katy Perry's "Firework". Susanna and Robin won with three of the judges' votes. Angela Rippon also made an appearance in the dance, alongside the women. Reid went on to compete as a contestant in the eleventh series of the show in 2013. Rippon went on to compete on the twenty-first series in 2023.

Individual judges votes in the chart below (given in parentheses) are listed in this order from left to right: Craig Revel Horwood, Len Goodman, Alesha Dixon, Bruno Tonioli.

Newsreader	Professional	Judges' votes	Dance	Music	Result
Susanna Reid	Robin Windsor	Sian, Susanna, Susanna, Susanna	Cha-Cha-Cha	"Firework"—Katy Perry	Winner (3 votes)
Sian Williams	Vincent Simone	Sian, Susanna, Susanna, Susanna	Cha-Cha-Cha	"Firework"—Katy Perry	Loser (1 vote)
Sophie Raworth	Ian Waite	Sian, Susanna, Susanna, Susanna	Cha-Cha-Cha	"Firework"—Katy Perry	Loser
Emily Maitlis	Pasha Kovalev	Sian, Susanna, Susanna, Susanna	Cha-Cha-Cha	"Firework"—Katy Perry	Loser

=== 2012 ===
A one-off special for Children in Need 2012 was broadcast on 16 November 2012 with Sir Bruce Forsyth and Tess Daly hosting, and judges Craig Revel Horwood, Darcey Bussell, Len Goodman, and Bruno Tonioli. Fan favourites Ann Widdecombe and Russell Grant made a special appearance in a parody of The Queen's Olympic opening ceremony scene with Daniel Craig as James Bond, and danced an "Angels and Demons" routine with their partners Anton du Beke and Flavia Cacace. Bruno voted for Ann and Anton, but Craig, Darcey, and Len all chose Russell and Flavia, who took home the Pudsey-on-a-glitter-ball trophy.

Individual judges votes in the chart below (given in parentheses) are listed in this order from left to right: Craig Revel Horwood, Darcey Bussell, Len Goodman, Bruno Tonioli.

Strictly fan favourite	Professional	Judges' votes	Dance	Music	Result
Russell Grant	Flavia Cacace	Russell, Russell, Russell, Ann	Medley	"Hernando's Hideaway"/"Heaven Must Be Missing an Angel"/"Better the Devil You Know"/"Boogie Wonderland"	Winner (3 votes)
Ann Widdecombe	Anton Du Beke	Russell, Russell, Russell, Ann	Medley	"Hernando's Hideaway"/"Heaven Must Be Missing an Angel"/"Better the Devil You Know"/"Boogie Wonderland"	Loser (1 vote)

=== 2013 ===
A one-off special was broadcast for Children in Need 2013 on 15 November 2013. Sir Bruce Forsyth and Tess Daly hosted the show, and was judged by Len Goodman, Darcey Bussell and Bruno Tonioli. The show featured professional ice skaters Jayne Torvill and Christopher Dean, who were partnered with James Jordan and Aliona Vilani. Bussell voted for Chris and Aliona, but Tonioli and Goodman voted for Jayne and James, who won the show and took home the Pudsey-on-a-glitter-ball trophy.

=== 2014 ===
The judges were Horwood, Bussell, Goodman and Tonioli. There were two teams, each consisting of two children and two of the show's professional dancers. Team Glitter's pros were Natalie Lowe and Anton Du Beke; Team Sparkle's pros were Aliona Vilani and Tristan MacManus. Team Glitter took home the trophy.

=== 2015 ===
On 13 August 2015, it was announced that Call the Midwife actors Jenny Agutter, Laura Main, Stephen McGann and Jack Ashton would appear on the 2015 Children in Need special. Forsyth and Daly hosted the special; this was Forsyth's final presenting appearance, as he was unable to host the subsequent Christmas 2015 episode and specials thereafter due to ill health.

Actor	Professional	Judges Vote	Dance	Result
Jenny Agutter	Ian Waite	Laura & Brendan	Medley	Loser
Laura Main	Brendan Cole	Laura & Brendan	Medley	Winner
Stephen McGann	Joanne Clifton	Laura & Brendan	Medley	Loser
Jack Ashton	Oti Mabuse	Laura & Brendan	Medley	Loser

=== 2016 ===
On 18 November 2016, British Olympians Canoeist Joe Clarke, Hockey player Hollie Webb, Taekwando athlete, Lutalo Muhammad and Rower Helen Glover competed in the 2016 Children in Need Special. Tess Daly and Claudia Winkleman presented the show, making it the first Children in Need not co-presented by Sir Bruce Forsyth.

Olympian	Professional	Judges Vote	Dance	Result
Joe Clarke	Janette Manrara	Lutalo & Karen	Medley	Loser
Hollie Webb	Neil Jones	Lutalo & Karen	Medley	Loser
Lutalo Muhammad	Karen Clifton	Lutalo & Karen	Medley	Winner
Helen Glover	Pasha Kovalev	Lutalo & Karen	Medley	Loser

=== 2017 ===
The BBC announced that former and current Blue Peter presenters would take part in the 2017 special.

Presenter	Professional	Judges Vote	Dance	Result
Anthea Turner	Brendan Cole	Mark & Amy	Group Jive	Loser
Diane-Louise Jordan	Pasha Kovalev	Mark & Amy	Group Jive	Loser
Konnie Huq	Neil Jones	Mark & Amy	Group Jive	Loser
Mark Curry	Amy Dowden	Mark & Amy	Group Jive	Winner
Radzi Chinyanganya	Chloe Hewitt	Mark & Amy	Group Jive	Loser
Tim Vincent	Dianne Buswell	Mark & Amy	Group Jive	Loser

=== 2018 ===
The BBC announced that the current members of Boyzone would take part in the 2018 special.

Boyzone singer	Professional	Judges Vote	Dance	Result
Keith Duffy	Nadiya Bychkova	Shane & Luba	Medley	Loser
Mikey Graham	Katya Jones	Shane & Luba	Medley	Loser
Ronan Keating	Gordana Grandosek	Shane & Luba	Medley	Loser
Shane Lynch	Luba Mushtuk	Shane & Luba	Medley	Winner

=== 2019 ===
It was announced on 28 October that four current EastEnders actors would take part in the 2019 special. The lineup included Louisa Lytton, who had previously reached the quarter-finals of the main show in 2006, and was won by Maisie Smith, who would go on to reach the final of the main show in Series 18.

EastEnders actor/actress	Professional	Judge's vote	Dance	Result
Louisa Lytton	Gorka Márquez	Maisie & Kevin	Cha-Cha-Cha	Loser
Maisie Smith	Kevin Clifton	Maisie & Kevin	Cha-Cha-Cha	Winner
Ricky Champ	Luba Mushtuk	Maisie & Kevin	Cha-Cha-Cha	Loser
Rudolph Walker	Nancy Xu	Maisie & Kevin	Cha-Cha-Cha	Loser

=== 2020 ===
Because of the COVID-19 pandemic, no competition was able to take place. Instead, the special featured a compilation of clips of members of the public and the cast of the current series of the show, dancing to the song "Shut Up and Dance" by Walk the Moon. At the end of the compilation, all three judges were each seen giving a score of 10.

=== 2024 ===
On Friday 15 November, the children's character Bluey was joined by several Strictly professionals, to perform a jive to "Land Of 1000 Dances", which included simplified, easy-to-follow along dance moves, such as the Floss and the Mashed Potato. Neil Jones, whom danced in the dance said: “Many stars have taken to the ballroom over the years but this is next level! I can’t think of any other better occasion for us to say G’day to Bluey than for Children in Need! It’s going to be Fab-Blue-Lous!”

=== 2026 ===
For 2026, the presenters of the Children in Need special each learnt a shortened dance with one of the Strictly Come Dancing professionals, dedicated to someone of their choice. They performed the routines live during the special on 13 November 2026. They were not scored, however children acting as the judges, and Pudsey Bear each awarded tens.

Celebrity	Occupation	Professional	Dance	Song	Dedication
Rylan Clark	Television & radio presenter	Amy Dowden	Salsa	"Spice Up Your Life"	His mum Linda
Sara Cox	BBC Radio 2 presenter	Julian Caillon	Jive	"Crazy Little Thing Called Love"	Her brother Rob
Alex Jones	The One Show presenter	Aljaž Škorjanec	American Smooth	"Wings"	The One Show challenge squad
Tyler West	Kiss FM presenter	Alexis Warr	Couple's Choice	"Always There"	His partner Molly Rainford
Mel Giedroyc	Comedian & television presenter	Neil Jones	Couple's Choice	"The Floral Dance"	Former Children in Need presenter Terry Wogan

== Other specials ==
=== Strictly Ice Dancing (2004) ===
Strictly Ice Dancing was broadcast as a one-off special on 26 December 2004; with Carol Smillie, Jessica Taylor, Scarlett Alice Johnson, Marcus Patric, David Seaman, and Rowland Rivron paired with professional skaters. This was won by David Seaman (who was a late replacement for Paul Gascoigne) and his partner Zoia Birmingham. Carol Smillie, a contestant on Strictly Ice Dancing, was a series 4 contestant, this time, dancing with Matthew Cutler.

Individual judges' scores in the chart below (given in parentheses) are listed in this order from left to right: Craig Revel Horwood, Doreen Hoppe, Nicky Slater, Chris Howarth.

Celebrity	Professional	Judges' scores
Carol Smillie	Oula Jääskeläinen	21 (4,5,6,6)
Marcus Patric	Leigh Mack	12 (2,4,3,3)
Scarlett Alice Johnson	Daniel Whiston	22 (7,6,5,4)
Rowland Rivron	Charlotte Clements	10 (1,2,4,3)
Jessica Taylor	Robert Burgerman	34 (8,9,9,8)
David Seaman	Zoia Birmingham	33 (8,8,8,9)

Strictly Ice Dancing was identical to the ITV format Dancing on Ice, although details of Dancing on Ice were revealed before Strictly Ice Dancing was commissioned.

=== Strictly African Dancing (2005) ===
A further one-off special was broadcast on BBC One on 9 July 2005 as part of the BBC's Africa Lives season. It featured six celebrities of African descent performing traditional African dances with a professional troupe. The contestants were Tunde Baiyewu, Tupele Dorgu, Robbie Earle, Antonia Okonma, Louis Emerick, and Tessa Sanderson. The programme was presented by Natasha Kaplinsky and Martin Offiah, and the winner was Robbie Earle. Professional dancers Darren Bennett and Lilia Kopylova, who have appeared on Strictly Come Dancing since the second series, also appeared on this special to perform a traditional African Samba.

Individual judges' scores in the chart below (given in parentheses) are listed in this order from left to right: Craig Revel Horwood, Todd Twala, Peter Badejo, Stacey Haynes.

Celebrity	Occupation	Judges' scores
Tupele Dorgu	Coronation Street actress	30 (7,8,8,7)
Louis Emerick	Casualty & Brookside actor	21 (4,5,7,5)
Tunde Baiyewu	Lighthouse Family singer	25 (5,7,7,6)
Antonia Okonma	Bad Girls actress	32 (7,8,9,8)
Tessa Sanderson	Former Olympic javelin thrower	29 (6,8,8,7)
Robbie Earle	Broadcaster and former footballer	33 (8,9,8,8)

The London cast of the musical The Lion King, led by South-African actress Brown Lindiwe Mkhize, took part in this broadcast. The company performed the trademark song "Circle of Life".

=== Strictly Come Dancing - The Live Tour DVD (2008) ===
The first Live Tour DVD was released on 10 November 2008, and was hosted by Kate Thornton, with Craig Revel Horwood, Len Goodman and Arlene Phillips judging. Series 3 winner Darren Gough and Lillia Kopylova were declared the winners. Couples are listed in the order they performed.

Individual judges' scores in the chart below (given in parentheses) are listed in this order from left to right: Craig Revel Horwood, Arlene Phillips, Len Goodman.

Couple	Position on Strictly	1st Performance scores	2nd Performance scores	Total	Dances
Darren & Lillia	Series 3 winner	29 (9,10,10)	29 (9,10,10)	58	Foxtrot & Paso Doble
Denise & Matthew	Series 2 runner-up	27 (9,9,9)	28 (9,9,10)	55	Quickstep & Rumba
Louisa & Vincent	Series 4 contestant	28 (8,10,10)	30 (10,10,10)	58	Argentine Tango & Jive
James & Camilla	Series 3 contestant	28 (9,10,9)	21 (5,8,8)	49	Waltz & Cha Cha Cha
Chris & Nicole	Series 1 runner-up	19 (5,6,8)	18 (2,6,10)	37	Tango & Paso Doble
Letitia & Darren	Series 5 contestant	29 (9,10,10)	26 (8,9,9)	55	Foxtrot & Jive
Matt & Flavia	Series 5 runner-up	26 (9,8,9)	30 (10,10,10)	56	American Smooth & Salsa
Zoe & Ian	Series 3 finalist	30 (10,10,10)	29 (9,10,10)	59	Tango & Samba

=== Strictly Come Dancing - Live At The O2 DVD (2009) ===
The second Live Tour DVD (titled Strictly Come Dancing - Live At The O2) was released on 9 November 2009, and was hosted by Kate Thornton. Craig Revel Horwood, Len Goodman, Bruno Tonioli and Arlene Phillips were the judges. The eventual winners was Series 5 semi-finalist Gethin Jones and his partner Flavia Cacace. Gethin and Julian Clary were paired with new professional partners – Jones' partner Camilla Dallerup danced with her series six celebrity Tom Chambers, whilst Clary's partner (Erin Boag) did not take part.

Couples are listed in the order they performed.

Individual judges' scores in the chart below (given in parentheses) are listed in this order from left to right: Craig Revel Horwood, Arlene Phillips, Len Goodman, Bruno Tonioli.

Couple	Position on Strictly	1st Performance scores	2nd Performance scores	Total	Dances
Tom & Camilla	Series 6 winner	39 (9,10,10,10)	38 (9,10,9,10)	77	Quickstep & Samba
Cherie & James	Series 6 contestant	35 (8,9,9,9)	38 (9,9,10,10)	73	American Smooth & Rumba
Kenny & Ola	Series 5 contestant	31 (6,7,9,9)	23 (3,6,7,7)	54	Viennese Waltz & Paso Doble
Jodie & Ian	Series 6 contestant	35 (8,8,10,9)	25 (4,6,8,7)	60	American Smooth & Jive
Rachel & Vincent	Series 6 runner-up	39 (9,10,10,10)	40 (10,10,10,10)	79	Tango & Rumba
Gethin & Flavia	Series 5 semi-finalist	40 (10,10,10,10)	38 (9,9,10,10)	78	Waltz & Salsa
Julian & Lilia	Series 2 finalist	28 (5,7,8,8)	26 (2,6,10,8)	54	Quickstep & Samba
Jill & Darren	Series 2 winner	38 (9,9,10,10)	40 (10,10,10,10)	78	Foxtrot & Jive

=== Strictly Come Dancing - The Live Tour DVD (2010) ===
The third Live Tour DVD was released on 22 November 2010, and was hosted once again by Kate Thornton. Craig Revel Horwood, Len Goodman, Bruno Tonioli and Arlene Phillips were the judges. The winning couple was Series 4 winner Mark Ramprakash and Kristina Rihanoff. Couples are listed in the order they performed.

Individual judges' scores in the chart below (given in parentheses) are listed in this order from left to right: Craig Revel Horwood, Arlene Phillips, Len Goodman, Bruno Tonioli.

Couple	Position on Strictly	1st Performance scores	2nd Performance scores	Total	Dances
Kelly & Matthew	Series 5 contestant	39 (9,10,10,10)	39 (9,10,10,10)	78	Jive & American Smooth
Ali & Brian	Series 7 semi-finalist	39 (9,10,10,10)	34 (8,9,8,9)	73	Viennese Waltz & Samba
Ricky G. & Aliona	Series 7 contestant	16 (2,5,6,3)	22 (5,6,7,4)	38	American Smooth & Paso Doble
Natalie & Darren	Series 7 contestant	31 (7,8,9,7)	29 (5,8,8,8)	60	Quickstep & Cha Cha Cha
Austin & Lilia	Series 6 contestant	34 (9,9,8,8)	40 (10,10,10,10)	74	Jive & Tango
Zoe & James	Series 7 contestant	39 (10,9,10,10)	35 (8,8,9,10)	74	Waltz & Rumba
Chris & Ola	Series 7 winner	33 (8,9,9,7)	36 (9,10,8,9)	69	Rumba & Foxtrot
Mark & Kristina	Series 4 winner	39 (10,10,9,10)	40 (10,10,10,10)	79	Argentine Tango & Salsa

=== The People's Strictly for Comic Relief (2015) ===
On 11 September 2014, the BBC announced that a special non-celebrity version of the show would air for Comic Relief 2015. It featured six inspirational heroes who underwent four weeks of training before performing live in the studio.

The series began airing on 25 February 2015 over four pre-recorded episodes, the first two episodes introduced the contestants, the third episode on 5 March followed their training and preparation for the show. The fourth episode on 11 March saw the couples take to the dance floor, with the winner decided via an online public vote and announced live on Red Nose Day 2015 on 13 March.

The series was hosted by Tess Daly and Claudia Winkleman, and judged by Darcey Bussell, Bruno Tonioli and Len Goodman alongside guest judge Anton du Beke. Craig Revel Horwood did not take part as a judge due to prior commitments. The judges' scores were for guidance only.

Individual judges scores in the chart below (given in parentheses) are listed in this order from left to right: Anton du Beke, Darcey Bussell, Len Goodman, Bruno Tonioli.

Inspirational hero	Professional	Judges' scores	Dance	Music
Philip Barnett	Janette Manrara	40 (10,10,10,10)	American Smooth	"Big Spender"
Trishna Bharadia	Aljaž Škorjanec	35 (9,9,9,8)	Jive	"Runaround Sue"
Anna Kennedy	Robin Windsor	40 (10,10,10,10)	Charleston	"Charleston"
Cassidy Little	Natalie Lowe	40 (10,10,10,10)	Paso Doble	"O Fortuna"
Heather Parsons	Ian Waite	36 (9,9,9,9)	Viennese Waltz	"She's Always a Woman"
Michael Pattie	Aliona Vilani	33 (8,8,9,8)	Tango	"Perhaps, Perhaps, Perhaps"

=== The Weakest Link ===
==== 2008 ====
On 27 December 2008, a special episode of The Weakest Link was broadcast on BBC One featuring participants of Strictly Come Dancing. The game was won by series 6 celebrity Mark Foster, who beat professional dancer Anton du Beke in the final. Participants in order of elimination were:

Contestants	Round							
Contestants	1	2	3	4	5	6	7	8
Mark Foster	Craig	Arlene	Kristina	Anton	Mark R	Brendan	Heather	Winner
Anton Du Beke	Craig	Arlene	Kristina	Camilla	Mark R	Heather	Heather	Runner-up
Heather Small	Craig	Arlene	Kristina	Camilla	Mark R	Brendan	Anton	
Brendan Cole	Craig	Kristina	Camilla	Mark R	Heather	Anton		
Mark Ramprakash	Kristina	Camilla	Kristina	Camilla	Brendan			
Camilla Dallerup	Kristina	Kristina	Kristina	Mark R				
Kristina Rihanoff	Kristina	Arlene	Camilla					
Arlene Phillips	Anton	Kristina						
Craig Revel Horwood	Brendan							

The contestant was statistically the strongest link.
The contestant was statistically the weakest link.

==== 2021 ====
On 18 December 2021, The Weakest Link returned for a Strictly special as the first show in a revived series on BBC One with new host Romesh Ranganathan, it had a special 13 years ago previously. The contestants were: Clara Amfo, Dr. Ranj Singh, Catherine Tyldesley, Anton Du Beke, Janette Manrara, Hrvy, Emma Barton and Ore Oduba.

Contestants	Round						
Contestants	1	2	3	4	5	6	7
Clara Amfo	Emma	Catherine	Janette	Anton	Dr. Ranj	Emma	Winner
Ore Oduba	Hrvy	Anton	Janette	Anton	Clara	Emma	Runner-up
Emma Barton	Hrvy	Clara	Janette	Clara	Dr. Ranj	Clara	
Dr. Ranj Singh	Catherine	Anton	Janette	Anton	Clara		
Anton Du Beke	Hrvy	Catherine	Janette	Dr. Ranj			
Janette Manrara	Hrvy	Catherine	Anton				
Catherine Tyldesley	Hrvy	Dr. Ranj					
Hrvy	Emma						

The contestant was statistically the strongest link.
The contestant was statistically the weakest link.

==== 2022 ====
On 17 December 2022, The Weakest Link returned for another Strictly special. It included professional dancers Amy Dowden, Kai Widdrington, Karen Hauer and Joanne Clifton, and former celebrity contestants Max George, Dan Walker, Jayde Adams and Rhys Stephenson.

Contestants	Round						
Contestants	1	2	3	4	5	6	7
Dan Walker	Karen	Jayde	Kai	Joanne	Amy	Max	Winner
Rhys Stephenson	Max	Kai	Kai	Joanne	Amy	Max	Runner-up
Max George	Karen	Kai	Joanne	Joanne	Rhys	Rhys	
Amy Dowden	Karen	Jayde	Kai	Max	Max		
Joanne Clifton	Karen	Max	Kai	Max			
Kai Widdrington	Karen	Amy	Joanne				
Jayde Adams	Max	Amy					
Karen Hauer	Max						

The contestant was statistically the strongest link.
The contestant was statistically the weakest link.

==== 2024 ====
On 21 December 2024, The Weakest Link returned for another Strictly special. It included professional dancers Kai Widdrington, Carlos Gu, Lauren Oakley, Michelle Tsiakkas and Joanne Clifton, and former celebrity contestants James Bye, Zara McDermott and Kelvin Fletcher.

Contestants	Round						
Contestants	1	2	3	4	5	6	7
Lauren Oakley	Carlos	Zara	Kelvin	Joanne	Michelle	James	Winner
Kelvin Fletcher	Carlos	Zara	Kai	Lauren	Michelle	James	Runner-up
James Bye	Carlos	Zara	Kai	Joanne	Kelvin	Lauren	
Michelle Tsiakkas	Carlos	Zara	Kai	Joanne	Kelvin		
Joanne Clifton	Carlos	Zara	Kai	Michelle			
Kai Widdrington	Carlos	Zara	Kelvin				
Zara McDermott	Carlos	Kai					
Carlos Gu	Kelvin						

The contestant was statistically the strongest link.
The contestant was statistically the weakest link.
