= Nadiya Bychkova =

Ukrainian ballroom dancer (born 1989)

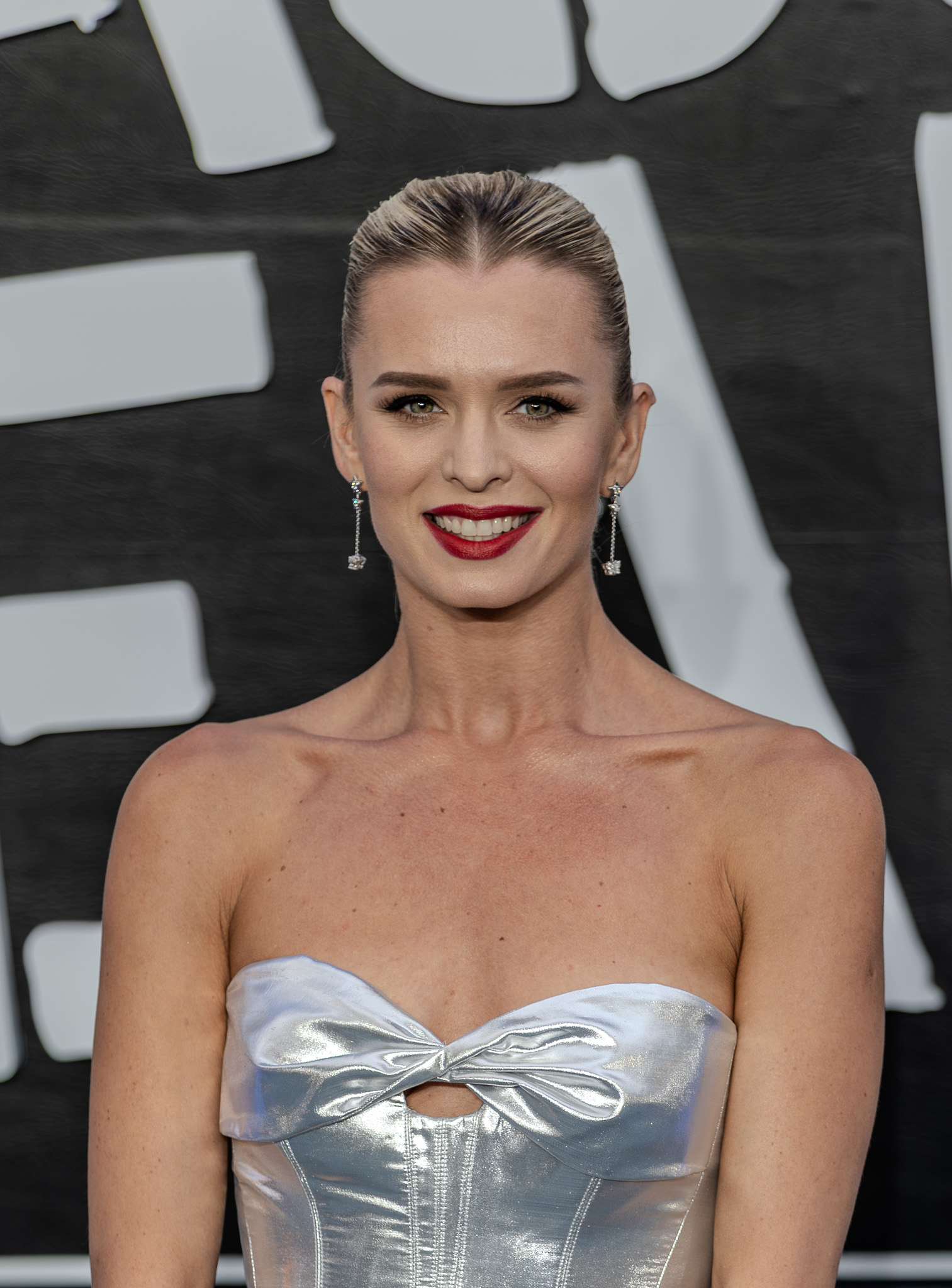
- Bychkova in 2025
- Born: Nadiya Bychkova; 24 August 1989 (age 37); Voroshilovgrad, Ukrainian SSR, Soviet Union
- Occupations: Ballroom and latin dancer
- Height: 173 cm (5 ft 8 in)
- Spouse: Sergey Konovaltsev (m. 2013; div. 2015)
- Partners: Matija Škarabot (2015-2022); Kai Widdrington (2022-2024)
- Children: 1

Nadiya Bychkova (Ukrainian: Надія Бичкова; born 24 August 1989) is a Ukrainian ballroom and Latin American dancer who is a multiple-time Slovenian Ballroom and Latin Champion and two-time World and European Champion in '10' Dance. Between 2017 and 2025, she was a professional dancer on the British competition dance show Strictly Come Dancing. She holds two Guinness World Records at Strictly's Pro Challenge for the most dance steps in 30 seconds - for fleckerls in 2020 and pat-a-cakes in 2021.

== Personal life ==
In 2013, Bychkova married Russian dancer Sergey Konovaltsev; the marriage lasted two years. Bychkova was later engaged to Slovenian footballer Matija Skarabot, with whom she has a daughter named Mila.

In April 2015, Bychkova featured in the Ukrainian edition of Playboy magazine; she was also on the cover of FHM in March 2012.

In an appearance on Saturday Mash-Up! in January 2022, Bychkova was 'Super Slimed' with 20 buckets of gunge, after receiving 63% of a viewer vote against Dan Walker and Kai Widdrington. Also in January 2022, she announced that she and Matija were no longer a couple and had been living apart for a while. In June 2022, she confirmed she was in a relationship with Strictly co-star Kai Widdrington, although they are reportedly no longer together as of July 2024.

== Career ==
=== Strictly Come Dancing ===
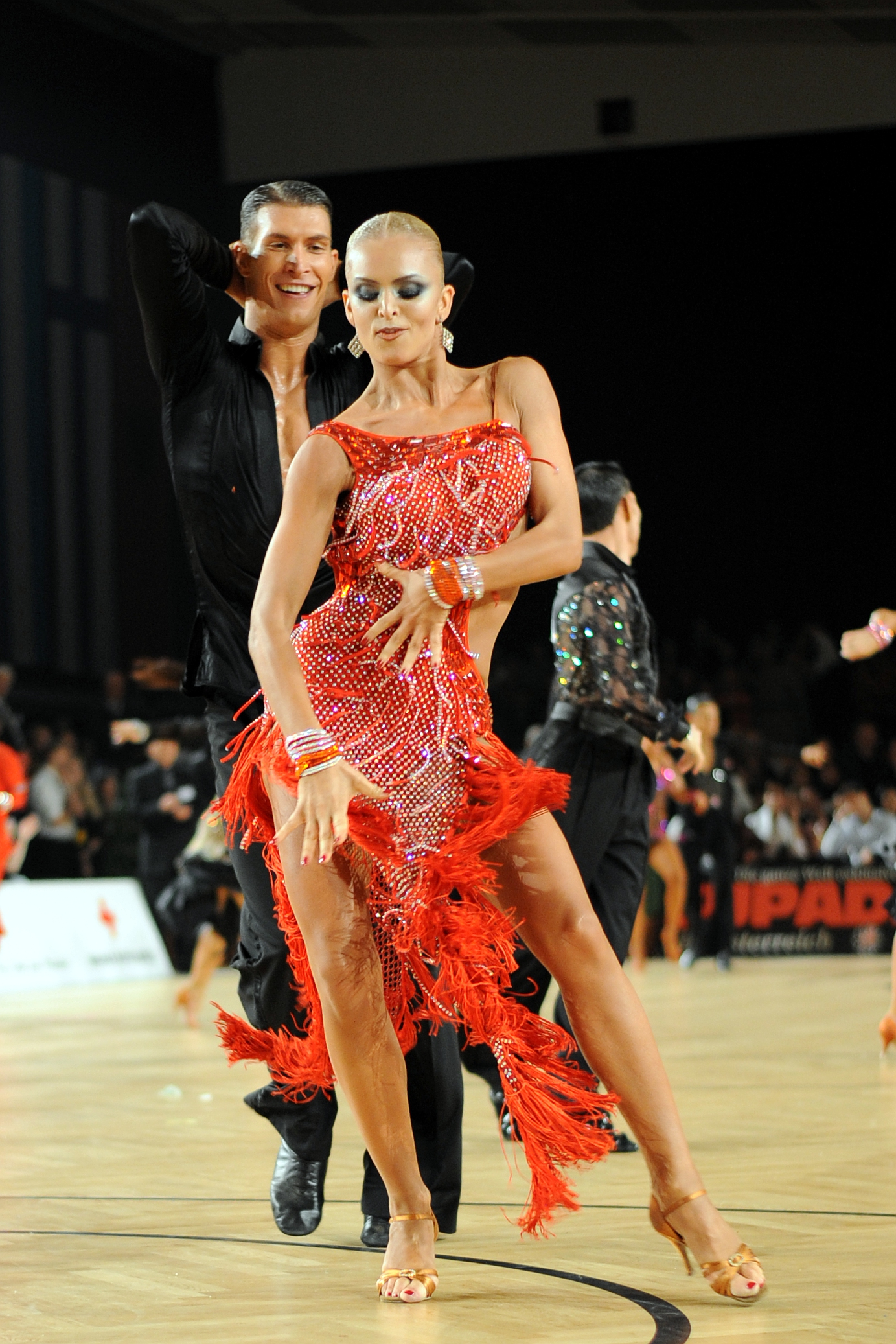
Cha-cha-cha performed by Nadiya Bychkova and Miha Vodicar

In 2017, Bychkova appeared as a professional dancer in the fifteenth series of the British television dance show Strictly Come Dancing, partnered with EastEnders actor Davood Ghadami. They reached the quarter final of the competition, finishing in sixth place.

She returned for her second series in 2018, partnered with another 'former' EastEnders actor and Blue singer Lee Ryan. The couple were eliminated in week three.

Bychkova returned for her third series in 2019 and was partnered with ex-professional footballer David James. They were the fourth couple to be eliminated.

In 2021, Bychkova was paired with television journalist, BBC Breakfast, The NFL Show and former Football Focus presenter Dan Walker, some 10 inches (25 cm) taller. In 2022, Bychkova was paired with singer, Matt Goss. They were the third couple to be eliminated. In 2023, Bychkova returned to the series but had no celebrity partner. In 2024, Bychkova was paired with Olympic swimmer Tom Dean. They were the first couple to be eliminated after losing the first dance-off to Toyah Willcox and Neil Jones. For the twenty-third series which transpired to be Bychkova's last, she was paired with former England rugby player Chris Robshaw, and they were the third couple to be eliminated after losing the dance off to Balvinder Sopal and Julian Caillon in the fourth week.

She had previously been a professional dancer on the Bosnian version of the show. She also participated in the Christmas Special 3 times: with Larry Lamb in 2022, Dan Snow in 2023 and Billy Monger in 2024.

In March 2026, it was announced that Bychkova would not be returning after being axed from the show along with several other professional dancers. Speaking on her exit, she said "After nine wonderful years, this part of my journey with Strictly Come Dancing is evolving. [The show] has allowed me to discover new sides of myself, develop new skills, and evolve as an artist in ways I will always be grateful for. This isn’t the end... I look forward to being part of the Strictly world for many years to come in ways I am beginning to explore"

| Series | Partner | Place | Average Score |
|---|---|---|---|
| 15 | Davood Ghadami | 6th | 30.4 |
| 16 | Lee Ryan | 14th | 22.3 |
| 17 | David James | 12th | 17.4 |
| 19 | Dan Walker | 5th | 27.5 |
| 20 | Matt Goss | 13th | 20.8 |
| 22 | Tom Dean | 15th | 21.5 |
| 23 | Chris Robshaw | 13th | 19.0 |

Highest and Lowest scoring per dance

| Dance | Partner | Highest | Partner | Lowest |
|---|---|---|---|---|
| American Smooth | Davood Ghadami | 35 | David James | 16 |
| Argentine Tango | Davood Ghadami | 29 | | |
| Cha-Cha-Cha | Davood Ghadami | 27 | Lee Ryan | 19 |
| Charleston | Davood Ghadami | 38 | Dan Walker | 31 |
| Couple's Choice | Dan Walker | 28 | | |
| Dance-a-thon | Davood Ghadami | 4 | | |
| Foxtrot | Dan Walker | 21 | David James | 17 |
| Jive | Davood Ghadami | 29 | David James | 16 |
| Paso Doble | Davood Ghadami | 35 | David James | 10 |
| Quickstep | David James | 28 | Matt Goss | 20 |
| Rumba | Dan Walker | 31 | Davood Ghadami | 25 |
| Salsa | Chris Robshaw | 24 | | |
| Samba | Davood Ghadami | 25 | Chris Robshaw | 14 |
| Tango | Dan Walker | 31 | Tom Dean | 23 |
| Viennese Waltz | Davood Ghadami | 29 | Chris Robshaw | 16 |
| Waltz | Davood Ghadami | 35 | Lee Ryan | 22 |

- Green numbers indicate Nadiya and her partner were at the top of the leaderboard that week.
- Red numbers indicate Nadiya and her partner were at the bottom of the leaderboard that week.

==== Series 15 ====
Celebrity partner: Davood Ghadami

| Week No. | Dance/Song | Judges' score (Note: Individual judges' scores are listed in the following order: Craig Revel Horwood, Darcey Bussell, Shirley Ballas, Bruno Tonioli.) | | | | Total | Result |
|---|---|---|---|---|---|---|---|
| 1 | Cha-cha-cha / "Dedication to My Ex (Miss That)" | 6 | 7 | 7 | 7 | 27 | No Elimination |
| 2 | Quickstep / "Last Nite" | 6 | 7 | 7 | 7 | 27 | Safe |
| 3 | Samba / "Stayin' Alive" | 4 | 7 | 7 | 7 | 25 | Safe |
| 4 | Viennese Waltz / "Say You Love Me" | 6 | 7 | 8 | 8 | 29 | Bottom two |
| 5 | Jive / "Tell Her About It" | 6 | 8 | 8 | – | 22 | Safe |
| 6 | Rumba / "Wicked Game" | 5 | 7 | 6 | 7 | 25 | Safe |
| 7 | American Smooth / "This Will Be (An Everlasting Love)" | 8 | 9 | 9 | 9 | 35 | Safe |
| 8 | Charleston / "The Lambeth Walk" | 9 | 9 | 10 | 10 | 38 | Safe |
| 9 | Paso Doble / "Live and Let Die" | 8 | 9 | 9 | 9 | 35 | Safe |
| 10 | Waltz / "With You I'm Born Again" | 8 | 9 | 9 | 9 | 35 (Note: The couple received 4 additional points for their dance to "España cañí" in the Paso Doble-a-thon.) | Safe |
| 11 | Argentine Tango / "The Phantom of the Opera" | 7 | 8 | 7 | 7 | 29 | Eliminated |

==== Series 16 ====
Celebrity partner: Lee Ryan

| Week No. | Dance/Song | Judges' score (Note: Individual judges' scores are listed in the following order: Craig Revel Horwood, Darcey Bussell, Shirley Ballas, Bruno Tonioli.) | | | | Total | Result |
|---|---|---|---|---|---|---|---|
| 1 | Waltz / "Take It To The Limit" | 4 | 6 | 6 | 6 | 22 | No Elimination |
| 2 | Jive / "Blue Suede Shoes" | 6 | 7 | 6 | 7 | 26 | Bottom two |
| 3 | Cha-Cha-Cha / "The Power of Love" | 3 | 5 | 5 | 6 | 19 | Eliminated |

==== Series 17 ====
Celebrity partner: David James

| Week No. | Dance/Song | Judges' score (Note: Individual judges' scores are listed in the following order: Craig Revel Horwood, Motsi Mabuse, Shirley Ballas, Bruno Tonioli.) | | | | Total | Result |
|---|---|---|---|---|---|---|---|
| 1 | Foxtrot / "Three Lions" | 3 | 4 | 5 | 5 | 17 | No Elimination |
| 2 | Paso Doble / "España cañí" | 2 | 3 | 2 | 3 | 10 | Bottom two |
| 3 | American Smooth / "Kiss from a Rose" | 4 | 4 | 4 | 4 | 16 | Bottom two |
| 4 | Quickstep / "From Now On | 6 | 7 | 7 | 8 | 28 | Safe |
| 5 | Jive / "Such a Night" | 3 | 4 | 4 | 5 (Note: Alfonso Ribeiro stood in as a guest judge this week.) | 16 | Eliminated |

==== Series 19 ====
Celebrity partner: Dan Walker

| Week No. | Dance/Song | Judges' score (Note: Individual judges' scores are listed in the following order: Craig Revel Horwood, Motsi Mabuse, Shirley Ballas, Anton Du Beke.) | | | | Total | Result |
|---|---|---|---|---|---|---|---|
| 1 | Quickstep / "Everybody Needs Somebody to Love" | 5 | 5 | 7 | 7 | 24 | No Elimination |
| 2 | Paso Doble / "Giant" | 7 | 6 | 6 | 7 | 26 | Safe |
| 3 | Foxtrot / "Once Upon a Dream" | 3 | 5 | 7 | 6 | 21 | Safe |
| 4 | Cha-cha-cha / "U Can't Touch This/Super Freak | 5 | 7 | 7 | 7 | 26 | Safe |
| 5 | Viennese Waltz / "She's Always a Woman" | 7 | 7 | 7 | 7 | 28 | Safe |
| 6 | Jive / "Rock Lobster" | 5 | 8 | 7 | 7 | 27 | Safe |
| 7 | Couple's Choice / "Classic" | 6 | 7 | 8 | 7 | 28 | Safe |
| 8 | American Smooth / "King of the Road" | 4 | 8 | 8 | 9 | 29 | Safe |
| 9 | Charleston / "Good Morning" | 7 (Note: Cynthia Erivo stood in as a guest judge this week.) | 7 | 9 | 8 | 31 | Safe |
| 10 | Rumba / "Desperado" | 6 | 9 | 8 | 8 | 31 | Safe |
| 11 | Tango / "Santa María (del Buen Ayre)" | 7 | 8 | 9 | 7 | 31 | Eliminated |

==== Series 20 ====
Celebrity partner: Matt Goss

| Week No. | Dance/Song | Judges' score (Note: Individual judges' scores are listed in the following order: Craig Revel Horwood, Motsi Mabuse, Shirley Ballas, Anton Du Beke.) | | | | Total | Result |
|---|---|---|---|---|---|---|---|
| 1 | Quickstep / "Sir Duke" | 5 | 5 | 5 | 5 | 20 | No Elimination |
| 2 | Samba / "Night Fever" | 4 | 6 | 6 | 6 | 22 | Bottom two |
| 3 | Viennese Waltz / "Hold My Hand" | 3 | 6 | 5 | 7 | 21 | Safe |
| 4 | Jive / "All Shook Up" | 3 | 6 | 5 | 6 | 20 | Eliminated |

==== Series 22 ====
Celebrity partner: Tom Dean

| Week No. | Dance/Song | Judges' score (Note: Individual judges' scores are listed in the following order: Craig Revel Horwood, Motsi Mabuse, Shirley Ballas, Anton Du Beke.) | | | | Total | Result |
|---|---|---|---|---|---|---|---|
| 1 | Tango / "Golden" | 5 | 6 | 6 | 6 | 23 | No Elimination |
| 2 | Cha-cha-cha / "Boogie Wonderland" | 3 | 6 | 5 | 6 | 20 | Eliminated |

==== Series 23 ====
Celebrity partner: Chris Robshaw

| Week No. | Dance/Song | Judges' score (Note: Individual judges' scores are listed in the following order: Craig Revel Horwood, Motsi Mabuse, Shirley Ballas, Anton Du Beke.) | | | | Total | Result |
|---|---|---|---|---|---|---|---|
| 1 | Samba / "Unbelievable" | 3 | 4 | 3 | 4 | 14 | No elimination |
| 2 | Viennese waltz / "Die With A Smile" | 3 | 4 | 4 | 5 | 16 | Bottom two |
| 3 | Paso doble / "Sweet Child o' Mine" | 4 | 6 | 6 | 6 | 22 | Safe |
| 4 | Salsa / “María” | 4 | 6 | 7 | 7 | 24 | Eliminated |

=== Dance tours ===
In September 2024, Bychkova and Kai Widdrington announced they were to appear at "Dancing With The Stars Weekends" 2025.

=== Other projects ===
In 2025, Bychkova starred in the Netflix movie 10Dance.
