= Harry Judd =

British drummer, TV personality and radio presenter (born 1985)

- Judd in 2022
- Born: Harry Mark Christopher Judd; 23 December 1985 (age 40); Chelmsford, Essex, England
- Occupation: Musician
- Years active: 2003–present
- Spouse: Brittany "Izzy" Johnston (m. 2012)
- Children: 3
- Musical career
- Genres: Pop punk, pop rock
- Instrument: Drums
- Member of: McFly
- Website: mcfly.com

Harry Mark Christopher Judd (born 23 December 1985) is an English musician, known for being the drummer in the pop rock band McFly. He also won the ninth series of Strictly Come Dancing in 2011.

== Early life and education ==
Judd was born in Chelmsford, Essex in southern England, the youngest of three children of Christopher John Henry Judd and Emma Mary Powell Williams, daughter of Paul Williams, of Elmbridge Mill, Little Easton, Essex. The Judd family appeared in Burke's Landed Gentry, as "of Maces Place", at Rickling, Essex; through his father he is a descendant of the landowner Lyonel Tollemache and of the Earl of Dysart. He was educated at Old Buckenham Hall, a preparatory school in the village of Brettenham, Suffolk, at Dame Bradbury's School, a preparatory school in Saffron Walden, Essex, and at Uppingham School, a private boarding school in Uppingham, Rutland. While at Uppingham, Judd was a contemporary of future Busted member Charlie Simpson and a member of Fircroft house. He was a promising batsman but gave up cricket to pursue a career in music.

== Career ==
Judd appeared in Busted's music video for their 2003 single "Crashed the Wedding", after which he joined McFly following auditions. Alongside his bandmates in McFly, Judd has been seen on TV programmes including The Paul O'Grady Show, T4's Freshly Squeezed and BBC programme Sound.

In January 2005, McFly guest-starred in an episode of the long-running BBC One drama series Casualty.

In May 2006, McFly starred in the teen comedy film Just My Luck with Lindsay Lohan and Chris Pine, which was released in the US on 12 May 2006 and in the UK on 30 June 2006. They played themselves in the film and the soundtrack featured a variety of their songs from their first two albums. During filming, rumours sparked of a relationship between Judd and Lohan. However, Lohan's reps denied this and said that it was just a publicity stunt.

In 2007, McFly appeared in the BBC One television series Doctor Who, with a short cameo role. Judd also appeared on the BBC2 panel show Never Mind the Buzzcocks.

On 8 May 2009, McFly appeared on the Channel 4 show Hollyoaks, playing a cameo version of their song "Falling in Love" outside the SUBar.

Judd appeared in McFly's own short movie Nowhere Left to Run. He starred in the leading role alongside his bandmates to promote their new album Above the Noise.

Judd performing with McFly in April 2011

Judd appeared in his first ever solo photoshoot early in 2011 when he covered the February edition of Attitude. He also appeared on All Star Family Fortunes.

Judd also appeared on the ITV2 Show Celebrity Juice on 1 March 2012.

On 6 July 2012, Judd appeared on The Million Pound Drop Live along with Michelle, his partner he only met in person once they were on stage. They won £25,000 each.

Judd has also appeared in his second solo photo shoot in the October edition of Attitude after earning their 'Hottest Man Honours' at the 2012 Attitude Awards.

In December 2013, Judd appeared on Celebrity The Chase with Chris Bisson, Gareth Thomas and Naga Munchetty. He earned £6,000 in his individual chase, but he, Bisson and Munchetty were caught by Mark Labbett in the final chase with 49 seconds to go.

Judd published his first book, Get Fit Get Happy, on 19 October 2017.

On 27 July 2023, it was announced that Judd would compete in Celebrity Race Across the World with his mother, Emma. The duo came 2nd place in the race overall.

== Strictly Come Dancing ==
On 19 November 2010, Judd appeared on and won a special Strictly Come Dancing episode for Children in Need, where he partnered Ola Jordan and beat Rochelle Humes from the Saturdays.

On 6 September 2011, it was announced that Judd would take part in the 2011 series of Strictly Come Dancing. In the launch show of the series on 10 September, his professional dance partner was revealed as Aliona Vilani. His performances were well received by the show's judges, and his scores landed him in the top half of the leaderboard each week. On 22 October, Judd received the first 10 of the series, from judge Alesha Dixon. On 26 November, he received the highest score of this series which was 46 out of 47 (including 3 tens for his first dance and the top score for the swing-a-thon). On 17 December, he and Vilani won the series final at Blackpool's Tower Ballroom.

On 23 March 2012, Judd performed again in BBC's "Strictly Come Dancing Underwater", as part of Sport Relief 2012, and was narrowly beaten by Chelsee Healey.

Judd won the 2015 Christmas Special with Joanne Clifton.

| Week # | Dance/Song | Judges' scores | | | | | Result |
|---|---|---|---|---|---|---|---|
| Week # | Dance/Song | Horwood | Goodman | Dixon | Tonioli | Total | Result |
| 1 | Cha-cha-cha / "Moves Like Jagger" | 6 | 7 | 8 | 7 | 28 | No elimination |
| 2 | Foxtrot / "Just the Way You Are" | 6 | 6 | 7 | 7 | 26 | Safe |
| 3 | Jive / "Greased Lightnin'" | 8 | 8 | 9 | 8 | 33 | Safe |
| 4 | Waltz / "Come Away with Me" | 8 | 8 | 10 | 9 | 35 | Safe |
| 5 | Tango / "Psycho Killer" | 8 | 7 | 10 | 9 | 34 | Safe |
| 6 | Samba / "I Wish" | 8 | 9 | 9 | 8 | 34 | Safe |
| 7 | Argentine tango / "Asi se Baila el Tango" | 9 | 8 | 10 | 10 | 37 | Safe |
| 8 | Salsa / "I'm Still Standing" | 8 | 8 | 9 | 9 | 34 | Safe |
| 9 | Quickstep / "Don't Get Me Wrong" | 9 | 10 | 10 | 10 | 39 | Safe |
| 10 | Rumba / "(Everything I Do) I Do It for You" | 9 | 9 | 9 | 9 | 36 | Safe |
| 11 | Viennese waltz / "This Year's Love"; Charleston / "I'm Just Wild About Harry" | 9; 9 | 10; 10 | 10; 10 | 10; 10 | 39; 39 | Safe |
| 12 | Quickstep / "Don't Get Me Wrong"; Freestyle / "Great Balls of Fire"; American Smooth / "Can't Help Falling in Love"; Argentine tango / "Asi se Baila el Tango" | 10; 9; 9; 10 | 10; 9; 10; 10 | 10; 10; 10; 10 | 10; 9; 10; 10 | 40; 37; 39; 40 | Winner |

Purple score from American season 11 winner Jennifer Grey, who replaced Goodman.

== Personal life ==
Judd met his wife, former Escala violinist Brittany "Izzy" Johnston, when she appeared as part of the string section on McFly's 2005 concert tour. They married on 21 December 2012 at St Nicholas Church, Harpenden and have three children together. Their first child, a daughter, was born on 25 January 2016 after they struggled to conceive with IVF, and on 26 August 2017, their son was born after being conceived naturally. The couple's third child, a son, was born on 11 October 2021. Judd lives in Chiswick, West London.

Judd and his McFly bandmates support the Brain Injury Rehabilitation Trust (BIRT) through the Eyes Alight Appeal founded by his wife Izzy. His brother-in-law Rupert had sustained a serious traumatic brain injury as a result of a car accident in 1997 and Rupert's long recovery inspired Izzy to set up the appeal to raise funds to support BIRT's rehabilitation programmes.

He is an Arsenal fan.
