= Aliona Vilani =

Dancer

- Born: 1 May 1984 (age 42); Kazakh SSR, USSR
- Occupation: Professional dancer
- Years active: 2001–2016
- Height: 5 ft 5 in (1.65 m)
- Spouse: Vincent Kavanagh
- Children: 1

Aliona Valeriya Kavanagh (née Vilani on 1 May 1984; Russian: Алёна Валерия Вилани), also known by her stage name Aliona Vilani, is a Russian-Kazakh TV personality and was a professional dancer in the BBC TV series Strictly Come Dancing.

== Biography ==
Vilani started learning ballet when she was five years old. She moved to Russia with her parents at age 9 and started ballroom dancing at age 11, continuing ballet. In 1997, aged 13, she moved to the United States and joined the Kaiser Dance Academy in Brooklyn, New York. In 2001 she was part of the US Ballroom team for the National Dance Congress that won the Amateur Ballroom category.

Vilani turned professional at the age of 17. Since 2006 she has lived in Los Angeles where she competed, performed and coached. Her speciality is 10 Dance, she is also skilled in Salsa, Hip Hop and Jazz. In 2008–2009 she appeared in Dancing with the Stars Arena Tour in the U.S. In 2009 she appeared three times as a guest professional dancer on Dancing with the Stars in Hollywood.

In 2014 Vilani was featured in theatre show Licence to Thrill as the lead female dancer.

In June 2017 Vilani gave birth to a daughter named Bella.

== Strictly Come Dancing ==
Highest and lowest scoring performances per dance

Dance	Partner	Highest	Partner	Lowest
American Smooth	Harry Judd	39	Matt Baker	33
Argentine Tango	Harry Judd	40	Jay McGuiness; Matt Baker	34
Cha-Cha-Cha	Matt Baker	31	Gregg Wallace	18
Charleston	Harry Judd	39	Tony Jacklin	13
Foxtrot	Matt Baker	31	Harry Judd	26
Jive	Jay McGuiness	37	Harry Judd	33
Paso Doble	Jay McGuiness	39	Jay McGuiness	33
Quickstep	Harry Judd	40	Rav Wilding	20
Rumba	Jay McGuiness	39	Rav Wilding	22
Salsa	Jay McGuiness	36	Matt Baker	28
Samba	Matt Baker	38	Harry Judd	34
Showdance	Harry Judd	37	Matt Baker	34
Tango	Jay McGuiness; Matt Baker	38	Rav Wilding	19
Viennese Waltz	Harry Judd	39	Jay McGuiness	34
Waltz	Harry Judd	35	Tony Jacklin	16

Vilani first participated in series 7 in 2009, where she partnered Rav Wilding: they were eliminated in week 3 following a dance-off with actress Lynda Bellingham and her dance partner Darren Bennett.

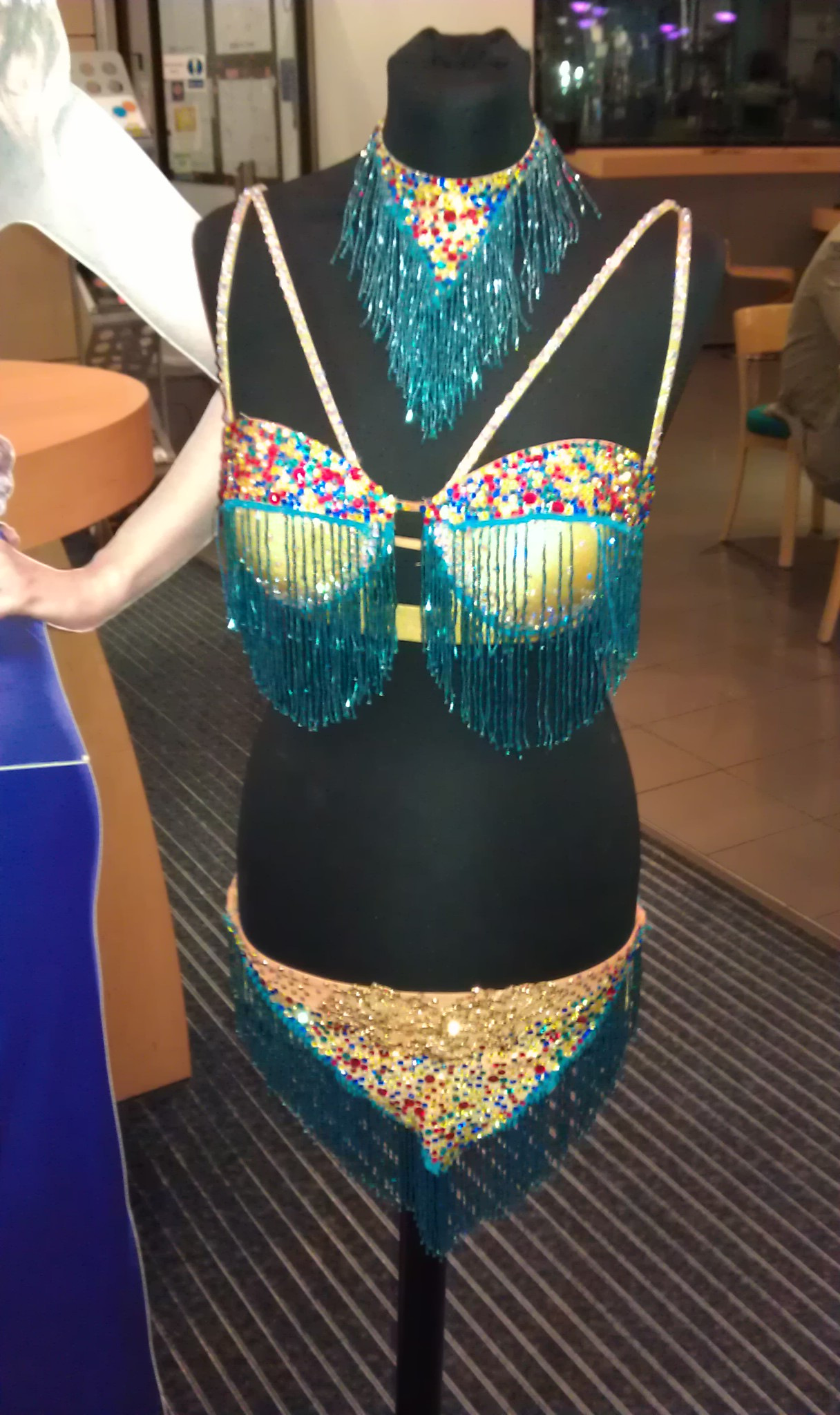
Dress worn by Vilani in the 2010 series, displayed at BBC Television Centre, Birmingham

In 2010 she appeared for the first time on the Strictly Come Dancing Live Tour where she partnered actor Ricky Groves. They danced the American Smooth and the Paso Doble. She also partnered Matthew Cutler in the professional dances. In April 2010 rehearsals started for the Strictly Come Dancing Professionals Tour in which she partnered Matthew Cutler & two weeks later the opening night started the 12-week tour.

Vilani was runner up in the 2010 series of Strictly Come Dancing, partnered with Matt Baker. Vilani and Baker then went on to compete and win the 2011 Strictly Come Dancing Live Tour.

She returned in 2011 for the 9th series of the show, where she and partner Harry Judd of pop-rock band McFly went on to win the competition, beating Chelsee Healey in the public vote and coming top in the final judges leader-board. Vilani and Judd then went on to compete and win the 2012 Strictly Come Dancing Live Tour.

Vilani returned for the 2012 series of Strictly Come Dancing, where she was paired with television presenter Johnny Ball. A training accident in the three-week interval resulted in torn ligaments for Vilani, causing her to retire at least temporarily from the show. She was replaced by Iveta Lukošiūtė who, with Ball, went on to be eliminated in the first week. Vilani did however return in the final group dance alongside Ball, and later took part in the 2012 Christmas Special, partnering Fabrice Muamba. In a TV interview in October 2017, Ball claimed Vilani faked the injury, with Vilani denying the allegation and saying she would take legal advice over Ball's comments.

In June 2013 it was announced that Vilani would not be competing in series 11. However, she reportedly reacted angrily, stating that it was "not her decision to leave, and I had planned to be on the show and now I have to make new plans". However, on 2 September 2013 it was further reported that professional dancer Natalie Lowe had a foot injury and that she would be replaced by Vilani. Her partner for series 11 was championship golfer Tony Jacklin but the couple were the first to be eliminated (in week 2).

Vilani appeared in a short special edition of Strictly Come Dancing featuring Jayne Torvill and Christopher Dean, filmed in support of the BBC Children in Need charity in November 2013. She also appeared on the 2013 Christmas Special, partnering Matt Goss; they scored 35 for their American Smooth.

Vilani returned for the 12th series of Strictly in 2014; she and her partner Gregg Wallace were voted off in round two, making Vilani the first dancer to be voted off first in two consecutive years.

In December 2014, Aliona Vilani won the Christmas Special partnering Louis Smith. They earned a perfect score of 40 from the judges for their quickstep to "Jingle Bells" and won after the judges' and studio audience's scores were combined.

In September 2015, Vilani returned for the thirteenth series of the show and partnered singer from The Wanted, Jay McGuiness. In December 2015 they won the Strictly Come Dancing final, making her the first professional to win the show twice. A few days following their win Vilani announced she would not be returning to the series. Vilani and McGuiness then went on to compete and win the 2016 Strictly Come Dancing Live Tour.

=== Series performances and results ===
Series	Partner	Place	Average Score
7	Rav Wilding	14th	20.3
8	Matt Baker	2nd	34.3
9	Harry Judd	1st	35.6
11	Tony Jacklin	15th	14.5
12	Gregg Wallace	15th	18.0
13	Jay McGuiness	1st	34.1

==== Series 7: with celebrity partner Rav Wilding ====
Week #	Dance/Song	Judges' scores				Total	Result
Week #	Dance/Song	Revel Horwood	Goodman	Dixon	Tonioli	Total	Result
1	Tango / "Baby Did a Bad, Bad Thing"	3	6	5	5	19	Bottom Two
1	Rumba / "Temptation"	4	6	5	7	22	Bottom Two
3	Quickstep / "We Go Together"	3	6	5	6	20	Eliminated

==== Series 8: with celebrity partner Matt Baker ====
Week #	Dance/Song	Judges' scores				Total	Result
Week #	Dance/Song	Revel Horwood	Goodman	Dixon	Tonioli	Total	Result
1	Cha-Cha-Cha / "Ain't No Mountain High Enough"	7	8	8	8	31	No Elimination
2	Foxtrot / "She Said"	7	8	8	8	31	Safe
3	Quickstep / "Dreaming of You"	8	7	8	8	31	Safe
4	Charleston / "42nd Street"	9	9	9	8	35	Safe
5	Argentine Tango / "Bat Out of Hell"	8	8	9	9	34	Safe
6	Viennese Waltz / "Where the Wild Roses Grow"	8	9	9	9	35	Safe
7	Rumba / "Too Lost in You"	8	9	9	9	35	Safe
8	Samba / "Young Hearts Run Free"	9	9	10	10	38	Safe
9	American Smooth / "Empire State of Mind (Part II) Broken Down"	8	8	8	9	33	Safe
10	Jive / "Soul Bossa Nova"	8	9	9	9	35	Safe
11	Salsa / "Spinning Around"	7	7	7	7	28	Safe
11	Swing Marathon / "In the Mood"	Judges Awarded 4 Points				32	Safe
11	Tango / "Hung Up"	9	10	10	9	38	Safe
12	Samba / "Young Hearts Run Free"	9	9	10	10	38	Safe
12	Showdance / "I Like the Way (You Move)"	7	9	9	9	34	Safe
12	Paso Doble / "Don't Let Me Be Misunderstood"	9	8	9	9	35	Runner-up
12	Viennese Waltz / "Where the Wild Roses Grow"	9	9	10	9	37	Runner-up

==== Series 9: with celebrity partner Harry Judd ====
Week #	Dance/Song	Judges' scores					Result
Week #	Dance/Song	Revel Horwood	Goodman	Dixon	Tonioli	Total	Result
1	Cha-cha-cha / "Moves Like Jagger"	6	7	8	7	28	No elimination
2	Foxtrot / "Just the Way You Are"	6	6	7	7	26	Safe
3	Jive / "Greased Lightnin'"	8	8	9	8	33	Safe
4	Waltz / "Come Away with Me"	8	8	10	9	35	Safe
5	Tango / "Psycho Killer"	8	7	10	9	34	Safe
6	Samba / "I Wish"	8	9	8	8	33	Safe
7	Argentine tango / "Asi se Baila el Tango"	9	8	10	10	37	Safe
8	Salsa / "I'm Still Standing"	8	8	9	9	34	Safe
9	Quickstep / "Don't Get Me Wrong"	9	10	10	10	39	Safe
9	Swing Marathon / "Chattanooga Choo Choo"	Awarded	7	extra	points	46	Safe
10	Rumba / "(Everything I Do) I Do It for You"	9	9	9	9	36	Safe
11	Viennese waltz / "This Year's Love"; Charleston / "I'm Just Wild About Harry"	9; 9	10; 10	10; 10	10; 10	39; 39	Safe
12	Quickstep / "Don't Get Me Wrong"; Showdance / "Great Balls of Fire"; American Smooth / "Can't Help Falling in Love"; Argentine tango / "Asi se Baila el Tango"	10; 9; 9; 10	10; 9; 10; 10	10; 10; 10; 10	10; 9; 10; 10	40; 37; 39; 40	Winner

Purple score from American season 11 winner Jennifer Grey, who replaced Goodman.

==== Series 11: with celebrity partner Tony Jacklin ====
Week #	Dance/Song	Judges' scores				Total	Result
Week #	Dance/Song	Revel Horwood	Bussell	Goodman	Tonioli	Total	Result
1	Waltz / "What'll I Do"	2	5	5	4	16	No Elimination
2	Charleston / "It Don't Mean a Thing (If It Ain't Got That Swing)"	2	4	4	3	13	Eliminated

==== Series 12: with celebrity partner Gregg Wallace ====
Week #	Dance/Song	Judges' scores				Total	Result
Week #	Dance/Song	Revel Horwood	Bussell	Goodman	Tonioli	Total	Result
1	Cha-Cha-Cha / "Hot n Cold"	3	5	5	5	18	No Elimination
2	Charleston / "Hey, Good Lookin'"	3	5	5	5	18	Eliminated

==== Series 13: with celebrity partner Jay McGuiness ====
Week #	Dance/Song	Judges' scores				Total	Result
Week #	Dance/Song	Revel Horwood	Bussell	Goodman	Tonioli	Total	Result
1	Cha-Cha-Cha / "Reach Out, I'll Be There"	5	8	7	7	27	No Elimination
2	Waltz / "See the Day"	7	8	8	8	31	Safe
3	Jive / "Misirlou/You Never Can Tell"	9	9	9	10	37	Safe
4	Quickstep / "My Generation"	5	7	6	7	25	Safe
5	Paso Doble / "It's My Life"	8	9	8	8	33	Safe
6	American Smooth / "Li'l Red Riding Hood"	8	9	8	9	34	Safe
7	Argentine Tango / "Diferente"	8	9	8	9	34	Safe
8	Foxtrot / "Lay Me Down"	6	8	8	8	30	Safe
9	Salsa / "Cuba" (Gibson Brothers song)	9	9	9	9	36	Safe
10	Tango / "When Doves Cry"	9	10	9	10	38	Safe
10	Quickstep-athon / "Sing, Sing, Sing"	Awarded	3	Extra	Points	41	Safe
11	Rumba / "Falling Slowly"	9	10	10	10	39	Safe
12	Viennese Waltz / "Have You Ever Really Loved a Woman?"	8	9	8	9	34	Safe
12	Charleston / "Doctor Jazz"	9	9	9	10	37	Safe
13	Quickstep / "My Generation"	9	9	9	9	36	Winner
13	Showdance / "Can't Feel My Face"	8	9	9	9	35	Winner
13	Paso Doble / "It's My Life"	9	10	10	10	39	Winner
