= Lesetlheng =

- Location within North West (South African province) Location within South Africa
- Coordinates: 25.1495°S 27.1174°E
- Country: South Africa
- Province: North West
- District: Bojanala Platinum
- Municipality: Moses Kotane

Area
  - Total: 3.91 km^{2} (1.51 sq mi)

Population (2011)
  - Total: 2,627
  - Density: 672/km^{2} (1,740/sq mi)

Racial makeup (2011)
  - Black African: 99.0%
  - Coloured: 0.5%
  - White: 0.5%

First languages (2011)
  - Tswana: 85.1%
  - S. Ndebele: 3.5%
  - English: 2.7%
  - Sign language: 2.1%
  - Other: 6.7%
- Time zone: UTC+2 (SAST)
- Postal code (street): 0374
- PO box: 0374

Lesetlheng is a village in the Mankwe region of South Africa, on the borders of the Pilanesberg Game Reserve.

It is home to the Moruleng Stadium, at which Platinum Stars play their matches. The stadium and village have hosted both New Zealand and England national football teams in recent years during their preparation for the 2009 FIFA Confederations Cup and 2010 FIFA World Cup competitions.
