= Dance War: Bruno vs. Carrie Ann =

- Dance War: Bruno vs. Carrie Ann Promotional Advertisement made by BLT & Associates
- Created by: BBC Worldwide
- Presented by: Drew Lachey
- Starring: Carrie Ann Inaba, Bruno Tonioli
- Country of origin: United States
- Original language: English
- No. of seasons: 1
- No. of episodes: 7

Production
- Executive producer: John Hesling

Original release
- Network: ABC
- Release: January 7 – February 18, 2008

Dance War: Bruno vs. Carrie Ann is an American reality dance competition series featuring choreographers Bruno Tonioli and Carrie Ann Inaba, two of the five Dancing with the Stars judges. Drew Lachey, Dancing with the Stars season two champion, hosted the show.

The show, based on United Kingdom BBC Television series DanceX, was aired on ABC in the United States. Season one concluded on February 18, 2008. The show was canceled.

Dance War was considered a flop by most ratings' pundits, noting that the ratings showed a steady decline from week 1 through week 7.

== Description ==
The show's format was based on BBC's Dance X, which also starred Bruno Tonioli. Season one of Dance War premiered on January 7, 2008, on ABC and concluded with a two-hour finale on February 18, 2008.

The two stars of this show, Bruno Tonioli and Carrie Ann, chose and trained two rival teams of singing/dancing amateur performers that competed against each other. The winning team at the end of the season was rewarded a recording deal with Hollywood Records.

After the audition show, Dance War went live with the top 14 contestants. They were divided into two teams of six (three males and three females) with two contestants cut from the competition. In future shows, the two teams competed in various dance styles. Viewers voted for their favorite team. The captain of the losing team, Bruno or Carrie Ann, had to pick one of their team members to leave the show.

== Auditions ==
Season	City, State	Location	Date
1	Nashville, Tennessee	Tennessee State Fair	Saturday, September 15, 2007
1	Santa Monica, California	Santa Monica Pier	Saturday, September 22, 2007
1	New York City, New York	Central Park	Saturday, September 29, 2007

=== Week 1: Auditions ===
In the first show the fourteen finalists were chosen. They are (in alphabetical order):

Fourteen Finalists
Name	Age	Home town
Allysa Shorte	20	Fresno, California
Bradley Johnson	24	Nashville, Tennessee
Charity Baroni	20	Nashville, Tennessee
Chris Holyfield	18	San Bernardino, California
Corina Noelle	22	Southington, Connecticut
Elizabeth Huett	20	Riverside, California
Kelsey Bourg	20	West Monroe, Louisiana
Lacey Mason	22	Nashville, Tennessee
Mariel Sarangay	19	Chicago, Illinois
Marqis (Qis) Walker	26	Los Angeles, California
Maxx Reed	18	Bartlett, Tennessee
Phillip Bernier	24	Sterling, Virginia
Tony Czar	23	Los Angeles, California
Zack Wilson	26	Saratoga Springs, Utah

After the final 14 were introduced they performed "Let's Get Loud" by Jennifer Lopez.

=== Week 2 ===
In the second show, all the men sang "Hold On! I'm a Comin'" by Sam and Dave. Then the men were divided into two groups. The first group performed "Hard To Handle" by the Black Crowes and the second group performed "Larger Than Life" by the Backstreet Boys. After seeing all the men perform again, Carrie Ann Inaba and Bruno Tonioli chose who was going to be in their respective dance groups. With Carrie Ann starting first they each choose two men, these went as follows:

Carrie Ann's Group	Bruno's Group
Bradley; Chris	Zack; Tony

Then it was the turn of the women. All of the women sang "Bad Girls" by Donna Summer. The women then were divided into two groups, the first group performed "The Beat Goes On" by Sonny and Cher. The second group performed "Lady Marmalade" in the voice of Christina Aguilera, Mýa, Pink, and Lil' Kim. Bruno got the chance to pick first with each of them picking two women:

Carrie Ann's Group	Bruno's Group
Mariel; Elizabeth	Lacey; Kelsey

After choosing their men and women, the remaining six dancers had to sing again for the chance to be in either Carrie Ann's or Bruno's dancing group. The men sang "The End Of The Road" by Boyz II Men and the women sang "Survivor" by Destiny's Child. Bruno was the first to choose, and he chose Phillip and Charity to be in his group. While Carrie Ann was second to choose, and she chose to have Marqis (Qis) and Allysa in her dance group. This meant that Maxx and Corina were out of the competition. The final two groups were as follows (in alphabetical order):

Carrie Ann's Group	Bruno's Group
Allysa; Bradley; Chris; Elizabeth; Mariel; Marqis (Qis)	Charity; Kelsey; Lacey; Phillip; Tony; Zack

=== Week 3 ===
The theme of the show for week 3 was "Pop Music". Each group performed individually twice, with the men taking lead vocals in the first round and the women singing lead in the final round. At the end of the show the public was asked to vote for which group they preferred.

The opening number "Spice Up Your Life" by the Spice Girls was performed by all members. In the first round Team Bruno performed "A Little Less Conversation" by Elvis vs JXL and Team Carrie Ann performed "Run It" by Chris Brown. In the second round Team Bruno performed "SOS" by Rihanna and Team Carrie Ann performed "Call Me" by Blondie. The closing number "Don't Stop Me Now" by Queen was performed by all members.

=== Week 4 ===
This week the two teams performed songs from Motown and R&B. The opening number performed together by both groups was "Land of a Thousand Dances" by Wilson Pickett. Each team performed twice with Team Bruno performing "Caught Up" by Usher and "Think" by Aretha Franklin. Team Carrie Ann performed "Papa Was A Rollin' Stone" by the Temptations and "Upside Down" by Diana Ross.

After each team had performed twice, the host, Drew Lachey, announced the results from last week's voting. The winner of the voting from week 3 was Team Carrie Ann. Bruno was asked to choose four team members to keep on his team. He picked Lacey, Phillip, Tony, and Zach. Kelsey and Charity had to perform one final time by singing "Don't Leave Me This Way" by Thelma Houston. Bruno then elected to keep Kelsey. Charity is the first team member to be sent home. The teams at the end of week 4 are as follows:

Carrie Ann's Group	Bruno's Group
Allysa; Bradley; Chris; Elizabeth; Mariel; Marqis (Qis)	Kelsey; Lacey; Phillip; Tony; Zack

=== Week 5 ===
This week, the dancers had to take on country music. The show began with the teams performing "Loud" by Big and Rich. Team Carrie Ann performed first, singing and dancing to "The Devil Went Down to Georgia" by the Charlie Daniels Band. Then Team Bruno performed their first number, "Life is a Highway" by Tom Cochrane. Special guest Taylor Swift performed "Our Song". Team Carrie Ann performed "Black Horse and the Cherry Tree" by KT Tunstall, and Team Bruno performed "These Boots Are Made for Walkin'" by Nancy Sinatra. In the end, last week's vote went in favor of Team Carrie Ann, and Bruno was forced to cut another dancer from his squad. Tony and Zack were left in the bottom 2, and sang "If Tomorrow Never Comes" by Garth Brooks. Bruno picked Zack to stay and Tony was cut from the team.

The teams at the end of week 5 are as follows:

Carrie Ann's Group	Bruno's Group
Allysa; Bradley; Chris; Elizabeth; Mariel; Marqis (Qis)	Kelsey; Lacey; Phillip; Zack

=== Week 6 ===
For the final performance week, the teams of dancers had to take on Latin music. The show began with the teams performing a tango, "Dance with Me" by Debelah Morgan. Team Carrie Ann performed first, singing and dancing to "Conga" by Gloria Estefan. Then Team Bruno performed their first number, "Sway" by Pablo Beltrán Ruiz. Special guest High School Musical on Tour! cast performed. Team Carrie Ann performed "I Need to Know" by Marc Anthony, and Team Bruno performed "Whine Up" by Kat DeLuna. In the end, last week's vote went in favor of Team Bruno, and for once, Carrie Ann was forced to cut a team member from her squad. Chris and Allysa were left in the bottom 2, and sang "Hero" by Enrique Iglesias for the opportunity to stay on the team. Carrie Ann picked Chris to stay and Allysa was cut from the team.

The teams at the end of week 6 are as follows:

Carrie Ann's Group	Bruno's Group
Bradley; Chris; Elizabeth; Mariel; Marqis (Qis)	Kelsey; Lacey; Phillip; Zack

=== Week 7 ===
For the final week of the competition each team got to perform their biggest crowd pleaser. Team Bruno performed "These Boots Were Made For Walkin'" and Team Carrie Ann performed "Papa Was A Rollin' Stone" again. Also, the cast of Dancing with the Stars season 6 was announced. Each team also performed the single that they recorded earlier in the week. Team Bruno performed "Fallin' in Love" and Team Carrie Ann performed "Come With it."

In the end Team Bruno beat Team Carrie Ann in the season finale.

== Ratings ==
=== U.S. standard ratings ===
#	Air Date	Rating	Share	18-49	Viewers(m)	Weekly Rank
1	January 7, 2008	7.4	11	3.0/7	10.97	#19
2	January 14, 2008	7.0	11	2.9/7	10.50	#20
3
6	February 11, 2008	6.2	9	2.4/6	9.19	#20
7	February 18, 2008	6.2	10	2.4/6	9.15	
