= Mankwe =

- Location within North West (South African province) Location within South Africa
- Coordinates: 25.593°S 27.195°E
- Country: South Africa
- Province: North West
- District: Bojanala
- Municipality: Moses Kotane

Area
  - Total: 1.25 km^{2} (0.48 sq mi)

Population (2011)
  - Total: 551
  - Density: 441/km^{2} (1,140/sq mi)

Racial makeup (2011)
  - Black African: 100.0%

First languages (2011)
  - Tswana: 86.2%
  - English: 6.9%
  - Sign language: 3.1%
  - Zulu: 1.4%
  - Other: 2.4%
- Time zone: UTC+2 (SAST)

Mankwe is a small settlement north of Pilanesberg and Rustenburg in the North West province of South Africa. It falls under the Moses Kotane Local Municipality and the Bojanala District Municipality.

== People ==
The dancer Motsi Mabuse was born here in 1981 in what was then the nominal Republic of Bophutatswana.
