= Iveta Lukošiūtė =

Lithuanian dancer and choreographer

- Born: 29 June 1980 (age 46); Klaipėda, Lithuania
- Occupation: Professional dancer
- Known for: Strictly Come Dancing
- Spouse: Jenya Raytses (m. 2017)
- Children: 3

Iveta Lukošiūtė (born 29 June 1980) is a Lithuanian dancer and choreographer. 2 time World Professional Ten Dance Champion. 5 time US National Professional Ten Dance Champion. 4 time US National Classical Showdance Champion. She is best known for appearing as a professional dancer on Strictly Come Dancing between 2012 and 2014.

== Early and personal life ==
Lukošiūtė was born in Klaipėda, Lithuania on 29 June 1980. Lukošiūtė began learning ballroom dance at the age of 6 when she was accepted as a student at the Žuvėdra Ballroom Dance School. She danced for pop groups, concerts and festivals throughout Lithuania, and appeared in several music videos.

Lukošiūtė married Jenya Raytses in August 2017 and they have two children together.

== Dancing career ==
Lukošiūtė moved to Woodside, New York in 2003, where she went on to gain numerous dance titles including World Professional Ten Dance Champion, five time U.S. National & North American Professional Ten Dance Champion, four time U.S. National Classical Showdance Champion and two times World Classical Showdance Finalist.

In 2011, Lukošiūtė appeared on the eighth season of So You Think You Can Dance. She reached the top 20, however was the second female contestant to be eliminated.

== Strictly Come Dancing ==
In September 2012, Lukošiūtė was announced to be joining the Strictly Come Dancing as a replacement for Aliona Vilani who sustained an injury, Lukošiūtė was paired with Vilani's partner, TV presenter Johnny Ball, who was the oldest ever contestant to appear on the show. They were the first couple to be eliminated from the series. Lukošiūtė returned to the show for the eleventh series where she was paired with actor Mark Benton. The pair landed in the dance-off four consecutive times, a Strictly record before being eliminated in the ninth week, leaving them in 7th place. In Lukošiūtė's final series, she was paired with rugby player and model Thom Evans, they were eliminated in week five of the competition which was described as a shock, leaving them in 12th place.

Whilst appearing on Strictly Come Dancing, Lukošiūtė made guest appearances on British television chat shows such as Daybreak, Loose Women and The One Show.

Series	Partner	Place	Average score
10	Johnny Ball	14th	18.5
11	Mark Benton	7th	26.0
12	Thom Evans	12th	27.4

Highest and Lowest Scoring Per Dance

Dance	Partner	Highest	Partner	Lowest
American Smooth	Mark Benton	26		
Argentine Tango				
Cha-cha-cha	Thom Evans	27	Johnny Ball	17
Charleston	Thom Evans	32*		
Foxtrot	Thom Evans	30	Johnny Ball	20
Jive	Mark Benton	29		
Paso Doble	Mark Benton	25		
Quickstep				
Rumba	Mark Benton	23		
Salsa	Thom Evans	25	Mark Benton	22
Samba	Mark Benton	29		
Showdance				
Tango	Mark Benton	24		
Viennese Waltz				
Waltz	Mark Benton	28	Thom Evans	23

(*) Excludes extra score given by guest judge.

=== Series 10 ===
Lukošiūtė's first celebrity partner was television presenter Johnny Ball.

Week №	Dance / Song	Judges' scores				Score	Result
Week №	Dance / Song	Horwood	Bussell	Goodman	Tonioli	Score	Result
1	Cha-cha-cha / "Drive My Car"	3	5	5	4	17	No Elimination
2	Foxtrot / "Everything"	5	5	5	5	20	Eliminated

=== Series 11 ===
Lukošiūtė's second celebrity partner was stage and screen actor Mark Benton.

Week №	Dance / Song	Judges' scores				Score	Result
Week №	Dance / Song	Horwood	Bussell	Goodman	Tonioli	Score	Result
1	Tango / "Hernando's Hideaway"	5	6	7	6	24	No Elimination
2	Salsa / "Bom Bom"	4	6	7	5	22	Safe
3	American Smooth / "It Must Be Love"	6	6	7	7	26	Safe
4	Cha-cha-cha / "U Can't Touch This"	3	8	8	7	26	Safe
5	Waltz / "Apologize"	7	7	7	7	28	Safe
6	Paso Doble / "I Lost My Heart to a Starship Trooper"	6	6	7	6	25	Safe
7	Rumba / "Goldfinger"	5	6	7	5	23	Bottom two
8	Jive / "You Can't Stop the Beat"	5	8	8	8	29	Bottom two
9	Foxtrot / "It's a Beautiful Day"	6	8	7	7	28	Bottom two
10	Samba / "I Just Can't Wait to Be King"	7	7	7	8	29	Eliminated

=== Series 12 ===
Lukošiūtė's third celebrity partner was former rugby player Thom Evans.

Week №	Dance / Song	Judges' scores				Score	Result
Week №	Dance / Song	Horwood	Bussell	Goodman	Tonioli	Score	Result
1	Waltz / "You Raise Me Up"	5	6	6	6	23	No Elimination
2	Salsa / "Hot Hot Hot"	5	7	7	6	25	Safe
3	Charleston / "New York, New York"	7	8	7* / 8	8	38*	Safe
4	Foxtrot / "Build Me Up Buttercup"	6	8	8	8	30	Safe
5	Cha-cha-cha / "It's My Party"	6	7	7	7	27	Eliminated

(*) Score given by guest judge Donny Osmond.
