= Motsi Mabuse =

South African dancer (born 1981)

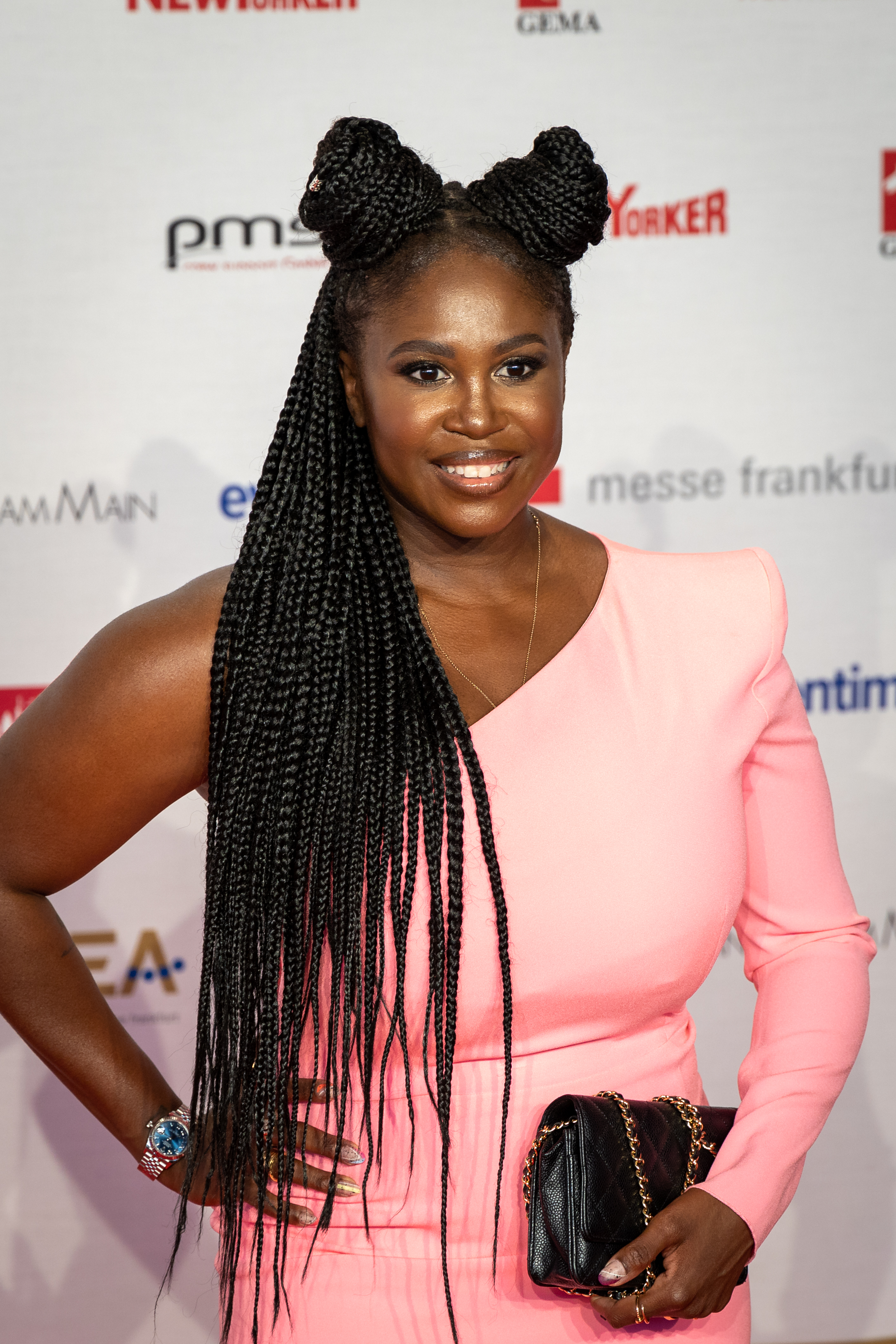
- Mabuse in June 2022
- Born: Motshegetsi Mabuse; 11 April 1981 (age 45); Mankwe, Bophuthatswana, (now North West Province), South Africa
- Education: University of Pretoria
- Occupation: Ballroom dancer
- Spouses: Timo Kulczak (m. 2003; div. 2014) Evgenij Voznyuk (m. 2017)
- Children: 1
- Relatives: Oti Mabuse (sister)

Motshegetsi "Motsi" Mabuse (born 11 April 1981) is a South African dancer who lives in Germany. She is known for appearing on the German dance competition Let's Dance, originally as a professional dancer, and later as a judge on the show, a position she has held since 2011. Since 2019, she has served as a judge on the original version in the United Kingdom, Strictly Come Dancing.

== Early life ==
Mabuse was born in 1981 in Mankwe, in what was then the Republic of Bophutatswana (now in North West Province), whose independence was internationally unrecognised by any country other than South Africa and the other three bantustans of Ciskei, Transkei, and Venda. Bophuthatswana became part of South Africa in 1994.

Her family moved to Pretoria when she was five. While in Pretoria, her sister Oti Mabuse was born, and they both took an interest in dancing. Motsi was educated at Hillview High School, Pretoria.

== Career ==
=== Competitive career ===
Mabuse was expected to become a lawyer and join the family law firm, but she became intrigued by dancing while studying at the University of Pretoria. Her education moved to dancing, and in 1998, she was the runner-up in the national championships. The following year, she found her dance and romantic partner, Timo Kulczak, at the British Open Championships in Blackpool. They married in 2003, and they competed in international dance competitions from their home in Germany. In 2013, she won the German Latin dance contest with the Ukrainian dancer Evgenij Voznyuk.

=== Let's Dance ===
Mabuse became known in Germany in 2007 through the second season of the RTL dance show Let's Dance, in which she danced with singer and former Eurovision Song Contest participant Guildo Horn. The couple were eliminated in the fifth show, and finished in 6th place. In 2010, she danced in the third season on the show with Rolf Scheider, a former juror of Germany's Next Topmodel, and reached fifth place. In the first episode, they had already been eliminated, but returned after the voluntary retirement of Arthur Abraham. Since 2011, Mabuse has sat on the judging panel with Joachim Llambi and Jorge Gonzalez.

=== Further television and stage performances ===
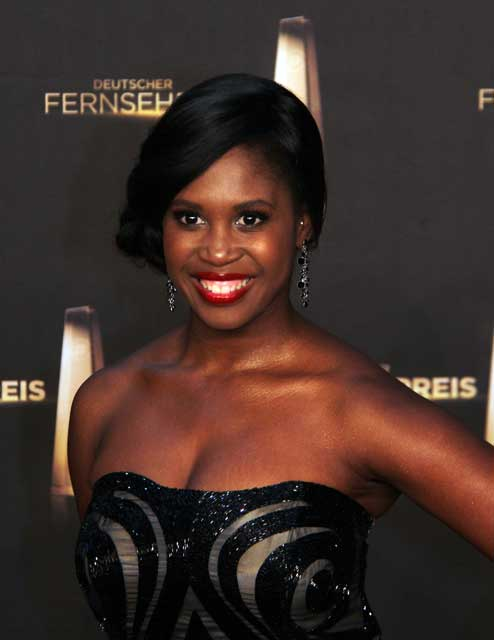
Mabuse at Deutscher Fernsehpreis in 2012

Mabuse was among the ARD broadcasting team for the 2010 FIFA World Cup and delivered background reports from South Africa. In 2011, she replaced Bruce Darnell on the jury of the fifth season of Das Supertalent. She was also a judge on the German version of Stepping Out in 2015.

In 2016, she made her debut as an actress at the 66th Bad Hersfelder Festspiele in The Crucible directed by Dieter Wedel. The same year she was a jury member of the RTL II plus-size model casting show Curvy Supermodel – Real. Nice. Curvy. In 2018, she became the presenter of the new styling show, Who Makes Me Beautiful on RTLplus.

In 2025, she was a contestant on Die Verräter – Vertraue Niemandem!, the German version of the The Traitors, where she was chosen as a traitor on episode one. She ultimately won the season alongside two fellow traitors without ever receiving a single round table vote throughout the entire season.

=== Strictly Come Dancing ===
In July 2019, Mabuse was announced as a judge on the BBC dance competition Strictly Come Dancing replacing Darcey Bussell, and has appeared since the seventeenth series. Her sister, Oti, was a professional dancer on the show between 2015 and 2021.

In 2021, Mabuse became an ambassador of Weight Watchers.

== Personal life ==
From 2003, she was married to her dancing partner, Timo Kulczak. In 2014, the pair divorced after 11 years of marriage.

In 2015, it was confirmed she was in a romantic relationship with her dance partner, Evgenij Voznyuk. She became Motsi Mabuse-Voznyuk in a small legal ceremony before celebrating with more guests in Mallorca in 2017, and had their daughter the following year. Between her television commitments, the couple run a dance school together in Germany, where Mabuse has been based for over 20 years.

== Filmography ==
Television
Year	Title	Role	Notes
2007, 2010	Let's Dance	Dancer	2nd and 3rd season
2011–present	Let's Dance	Judge	Season 4 onwards
2011, 2021	Das Supertalent	Judge, Guest Judge	5th season (Main), 15th season (Guest)
2015	Stepping Out	Judge	
2019–present	Strictly Come Dancing	Judge	Series 17 onwards
2020	Big Performance – Wer ist der Star im Star?	Panelist	
2023	DNA Journey	Herself	With Oti Mabuse
2024	RuPaul's Drag Race: UK vs. the World	Herself (Guest judge)	Series 2
2024	The Masked Singer UK	Contestant (Turkey Crown)	The Masked Singer UK Christmas Special
