= Bruno Tonioli =

Italian choreographer (born 1955)

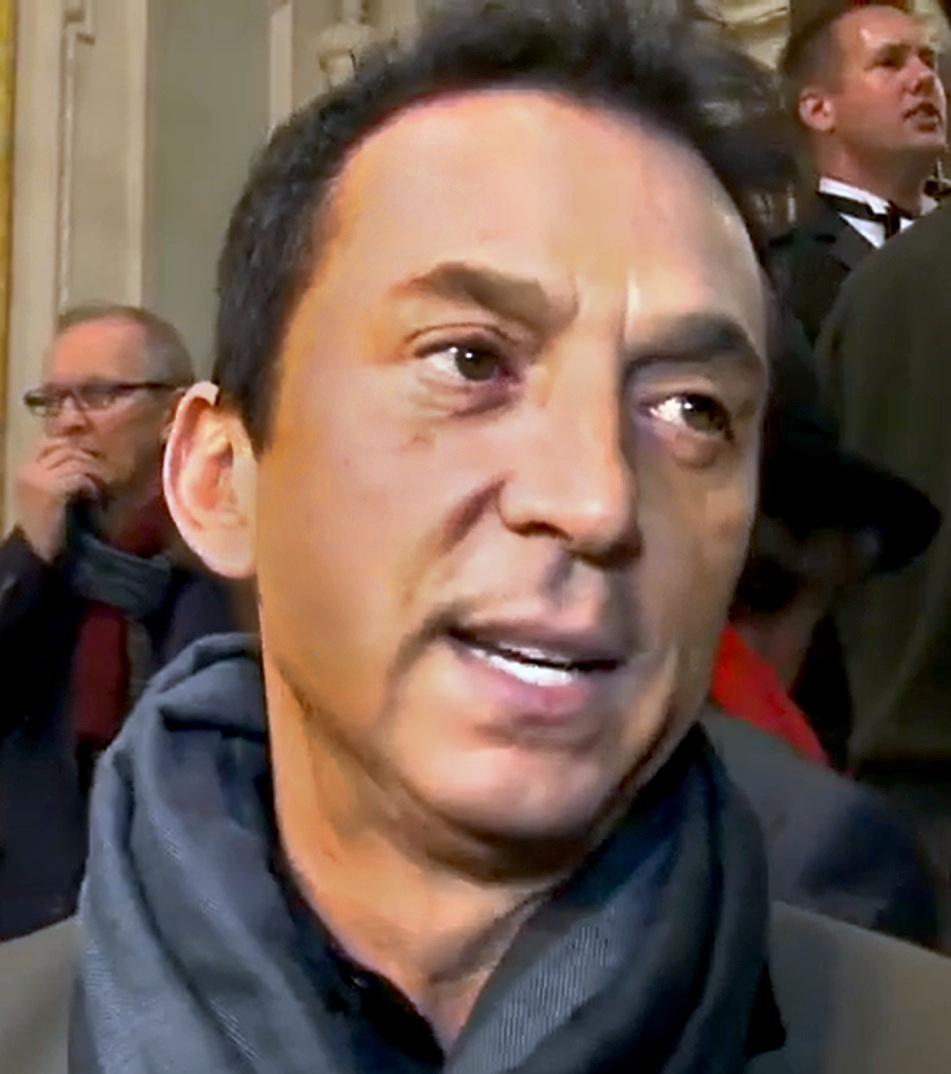
- Tonioli in 2015
- Born: 25 November 1955 (age 70); Ferrara, Italy
- Citizenship: Italy
- Occupations: Television personality; choreographer; dancer
- Years active: 1980–present

Bruno Tonioli (Italian pronunciation: [ˈbruno tonˈjɔli]; born 25 November 1955) is an Italian television personality, choreographer and dancer. He has judged on the British television talent shows Strictly Come Dancing (2004–2019), DanceX (2007) and Britain's Got Talent (2023–2025), and the American television talent shows Dancing with the Stars (2005–present) and Dance War: Bruno vs. Carrie Ann (2008).

== Career ==
In 1980, as part of the group Duke and the Aces, Tonioli performed in but did not win the United Kingdom's competition to select an entry for the Eurovision Song Contest.

Tonioli has worked in the music business as a choreographer for music videos, stage shows, and tours for artists such as Tina Turner, Sting, Elton John, the Rolling Stones, Camel, Freddie Mercury, Sinitta, Boy George, Dead or Alive, Bananarama, and Duran Duran. He danced in the Elton John video for "I'm Still Standing" (1983).

Tonioli choreographed the band Arcadia's music video for their song "Election Day", as documented in a 1980s documentary entitled The Making of Election Day. He was Anne Hathaway's choreographer in the film Ella Enchanted (2004).

In November 2016, Tonioli lent his name to an album released by Decca Records entitled An Italian Romance, a compilation of Italian songs by various artists selected by Tonioli.

In November 2018, Tonioli presented the BBC Radio 2 series Bruno Tonioli at the Opera.

In October 2022, Tonioli competed in the second series of The Masked Dancer as Pearly King, placing third behind Australian actor Adam Garcia (second place) and American actress and dancer Heather Morris (winner).

In January 2023, it was announced that Tonioli would be joining the judging panel for series 16 of the British talent show Britain's Got Talent, replacing David Walliams.

=== Strictly Come Dancing and Dancing with the Stars ===
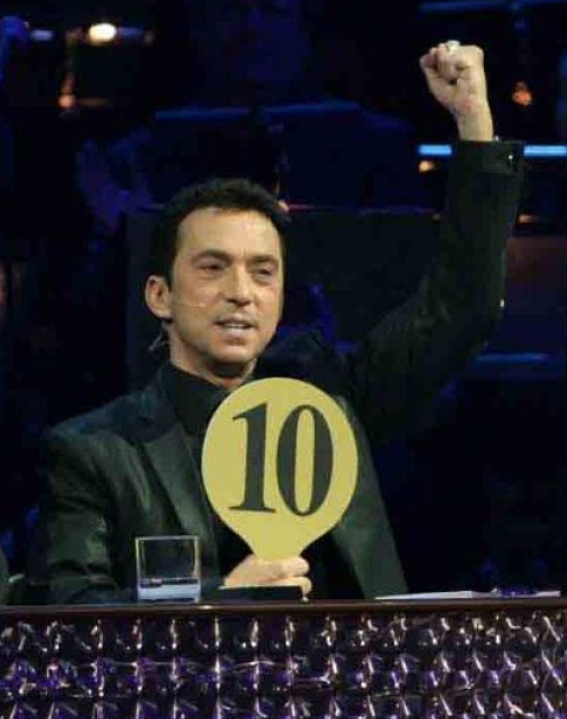
Bruno Tonioli at Wembley in 2009

In 2004, Tonioli was selected to be a judge on the BBC's Strictly Come Dancing, along with Craig Revel Horwood, Arlene Phillips, and head judge Len Goodman. In 2005, he was then chosen to be a judge on Dancing with the Stars, along with Goodman and Carrie Ann Inaba, where he, along with Inaba, has remained since. For one week during both series 16 and series 17 of Strictly Come Dancing, he was replaced by guest judge Alfonso Ribeiro, due to a broadcasting conflict between the two shows. In addition, Tonioli was also involved in the ABC talent competition Dance War: Bruno vs. Carrie Ann.

In 2020, due to flight restrictions stemming from the COVID-19 pandemic, Tonioli was stuck in the U.S. and therefore did not appear on the Strictly judging panel at all during the series, instead appearing each week via video during Sunday night's results shows.

On 24 June 2021, it was announced that Anton Du Beke, the longest-running Strictly professional, would replace Tonioli as a permanent judge on Strictly Come Dancing for series 19. It was then announced on 19 May 2022 that Tonioli would not be returning to Strictly, and that Du Beke would take over permanently.

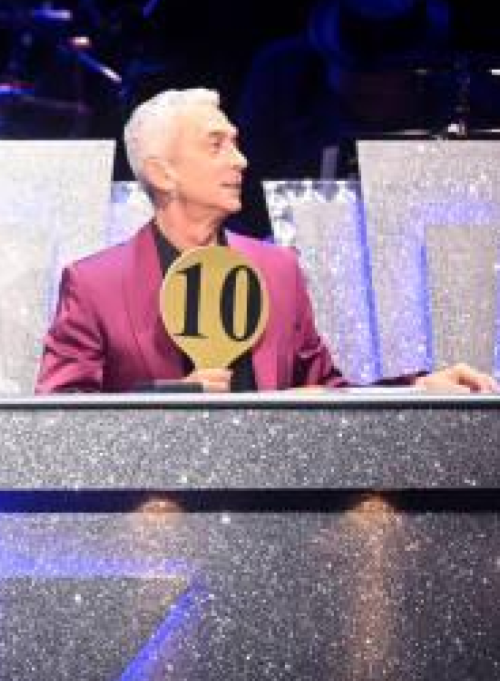
Tonioli in 2022

On Christmas Day 2022, in the Strictly Come Dancing Christmas Special, Tonioli made a guest appearance and sang "Don't Leave Me This Way" by the Communards. Reactions to the performance were mixed.

== Personal life ==
Tonioli is fluent in five languages: Italian, English, Portuguese, Spanish, and French. He has lived in London since 1975 but owns a property in Los Angeles for commitments in the U.S.

Tonioli is gay and has spoken of the homophobic bullying he suffered in his youth. In 2009, Rolling Stone magazine said that Tonioli had "won America's heart with his gay-Italian-maniac steez."

== Filmography ==
=== Television ===
| Year | Title | Role | Notes |
|---|---|---|---|
| 1981 | Blake's 7 | Dead Young Man | 1 episode; Uncredited |
| 1985 | Murder of a Moderate Man | Italian Policeman | 1 episode; TV Mini Series |
| 1985 | Oscar | Peppino | 1 episode |
| 1987 | Top of the Pops | Dancer | 1 episode |
| 2001 | The Bill | Rolf | 1 episode |
| 2004–2019, 2022 | Strictly Come Dancing | Judge, Guest Performer | |
| 2005–2019 | Strictly Come Dancing: It Takes Two | Himself | 41 episodes |
| 2005–present | Dancing with the Stars | Judge | |
| 2007–2008, 2015 | Dancing with the Stars Australia | Guest Judge | 7 episodes |
| 2007–2019 | Entertainment Tonight | Himself | 20 episodes |
| 2007 | DanceX | Team Leader | Also co-creator |
| 2008 | Dance War: Bruno vs. Carrie Ann | Team Leader | Also co-creator |
| 2010 | Strictly Cinderella | Himself | Cbeebies Special |
| 2012 | 8 Out of 10 Cats | Himself | 1 episode |
| 2012 | Top Gear USA | Himself | 1 episode |
| 2013 | Doctor Who Live: The Next Doctor | | TV Special |
| 2013 | Goodbye Television Centre | | TV Documentary |
| 2013 | Piers Morgan's Life Stories | | |
| 2013 | Let's Do Christmas with Gino & Mel | | |
| 2013–2015 | Through the Keyhole | Guest Panelist | 2 episodes |
| 2013–2017 | Celebrity Juice | Guest Panelist | 3 episodes |
| 2014 | Nashville | Himself | 1 episode |
| 2014 | Would I Lie to You? | Guest Panelist | 1 episode |
| 2014 | Celebrity Squares | Guest Panelist | 1 episode |
| 2014 | Room 101 | Guest Panelist | 1 episode |
| 2015 | The People's Strictly for Comic Relief | Judge | |
| 2015 | Celebrity Fifteen to One | Himself | 1 episode |
| 2015 | The Dr. Oz Show | Himself | 1 episode |
| 2015 | Reality Bites | Guest Panellist | 1 episode |
| 2016–2020 | Children in Need | Himself | |
| 2016 | Fuller House | Giuseppe Pignoli | 1 episode |
| 2016 | Michael McIntyre's Big Show | Himself | 1 episode |
| 2016 | West Side Stories: The Making of a Classic | Presenter | TV Documentary |
| 2017 | Saturday Night Fever - the Ultimate Disco Movie | Presenter | TV Documentary |
| 2017 | Eurovision: You Decide | Himself | TV Special |
| 2018 | Eyes of Faith | Himself | TV Documentary |
| 2018 | Tribute to George Chakiris | Himself | TV Documentary |
| 2018 | Sir Bruce: A Celebration | Himself | TV Documentary |
| 2019 | Tipping Point: Lucky Stars | Himself | 1 episode |
| 2020 | Celebrity Supply Teacher | Himself | 1 episode |
| 2021 | Horrible Histories | Emporer Nero | 1 episode |
| 2021 | Craig and Bruno's Great British Road Trips | Himself | 1 series; 6 episodes |
| 2021 | The Wonderful World of Disney: Magical Holiday Celebration | Himself | TV Special |
| 2021 | Take Off with Bradley & Holly | Himself | 1 episode |
| 2022 | The Masked Dancer | Pearly King | 8 episodes |
| 2022 | Blankety Blank | Himself | 1 episode |
| 2022 | The Wheel | Himself | 1 episode |
| 2022 | Portrait Artist of the Year | Himself | 1 episode |
| 2023–2025 | Britain's Got Talent | Judge | |
| 2026 | Vanderpump Villa | Guest | |

=== Film ===
| Year | Title | Role | Notes |
|---|---|---|---|
| 1986 | Absolute Beginners | Maltese Lodger | |
| 2003 | What a Girl Wants | Fashion Emcee | |
| 2016 | Absolutely Fabulous: The Movie | Himself | Cameo Appearance |
