= Strictly Come Dancing series 19 =

2021 series of Strictly Come Dancing

Strictly Come Dancing
- Series 19
- Presented by: Tess Daly; Claudia Winkleman
- Judges: Shirley Ballas; Anton Du Beke; Motsi Mabuse; Craig Revel Horwood; Cynthia Erivo (guest)
- Celebrity winner: Rose Ayling-Ellis
- Professional winner: Giovanni Pernice
- No. of episodes: 25

Release
- Original network: BBC One
- Original release: 18 September – 18 December 2021

Series chronology
- ← Previous; Series 18 Next → Series 20

Strictly Come Dancing returned for its nineteenth series with a launch show on 18 September 2021 on BBC One, and the live shows beginning on 25 September. Tess Daly and Claudia Winkleman returned as hosts, while Rylan Clark returned to host Strictly: It Takes Two alongside new presenter Janette Manrara, who replaced Zoe Ball. In June 2021, the BBC announced that Shirley Ballas, Motsi Mabuse, and Craig Revel Horwood would return to the judging panel. Anton Du Beke, who served as a guest judge in the previous series, joined the panel in place of Bruno Tonioli, who did not return for the second year in a row due to travel restrictions imposed by the COVID-19 pandemic.

In July 2021, the show's executive producer, Sarah James, said the show would return for a "full-length series", with fifteen celebrities, themed weeks, pre-recorded professional group dances, and a Christmas special, but no Blackpool Tower Ballroom special. For this series, the contestants were no longer restricted to perform one of the "couple's choice" categories — contemporary, theatre/jazz, or street/commercial — and could instead incorporate the routine however they wished. In September, a row broke out over whether dancers should be vaccinated against COVID-19. Reports had suggested that three dancers had refused to be vaccinated, with one unnamed celebrity already having to self-isolate since the show's launch night had been filmed.

EastEnders actress Rose Ayling-Ellis and Giovanni Pernice were announced as the winners on 18 December, while John Whaite and Johannes Radebe — the first male same-sex couple to compete on the programme — finished in second place.

== Format ==
Hosts and Judges for Strictly Come Dancing Series 19

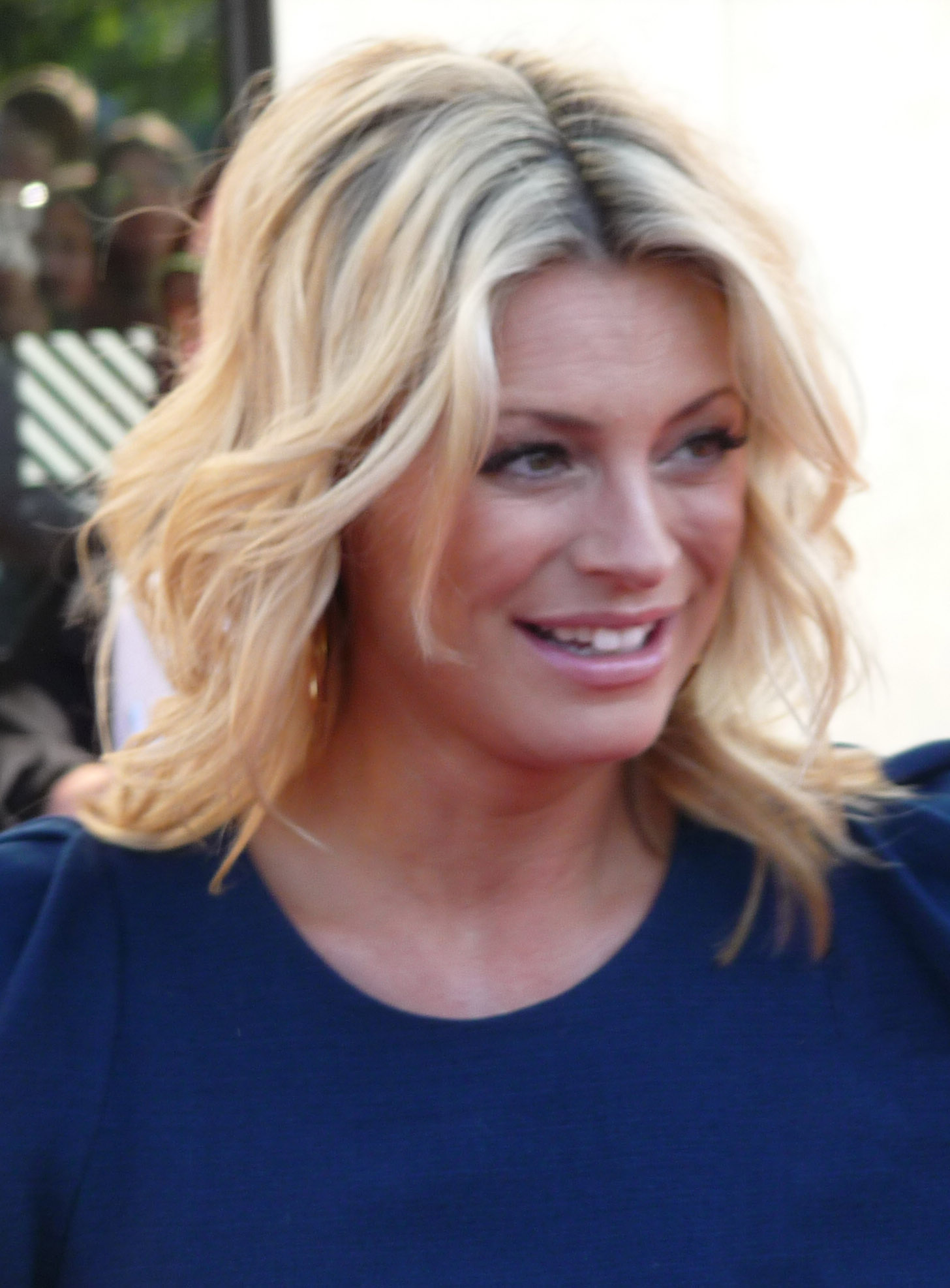
Tess Daly

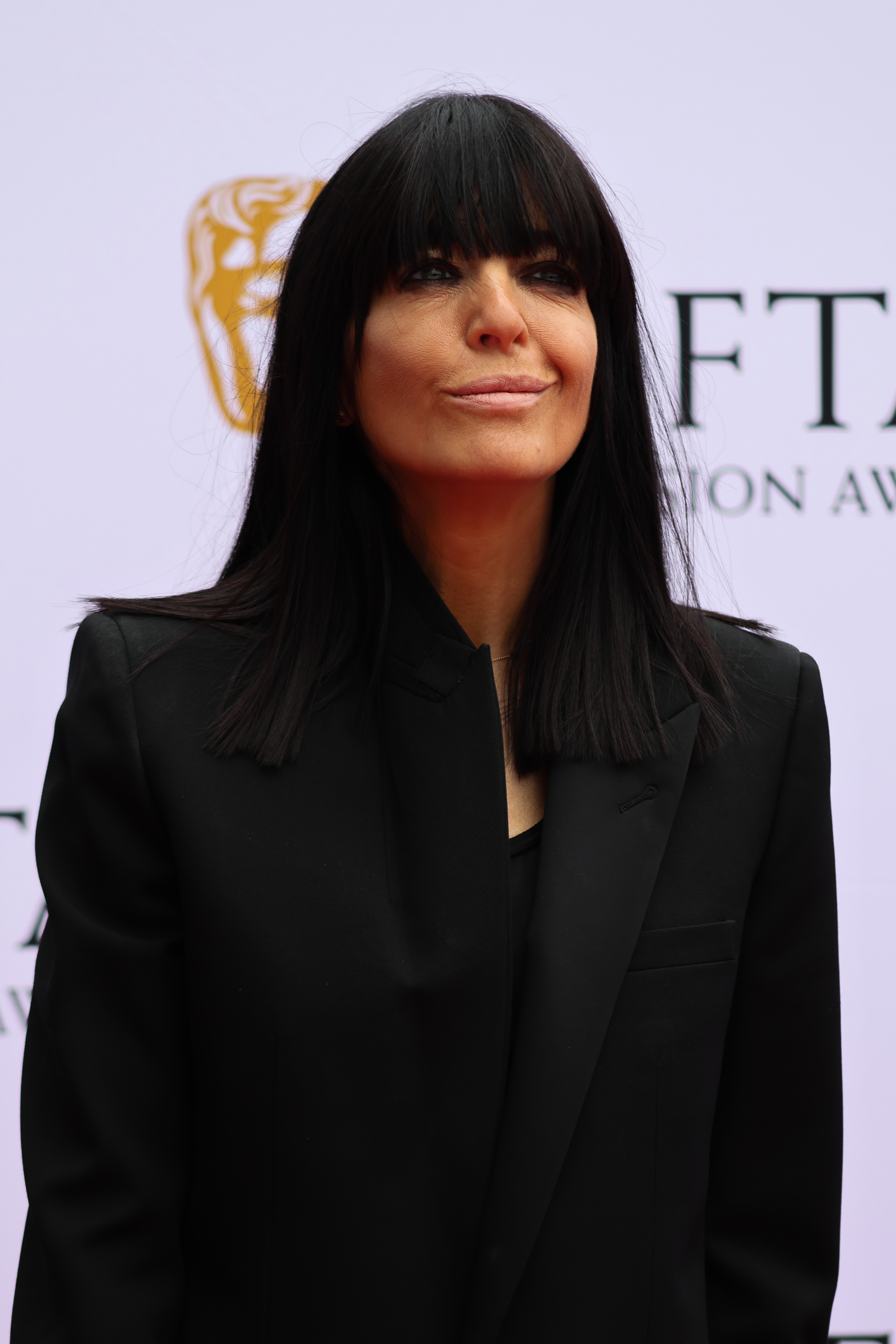
Claudia Winkleman

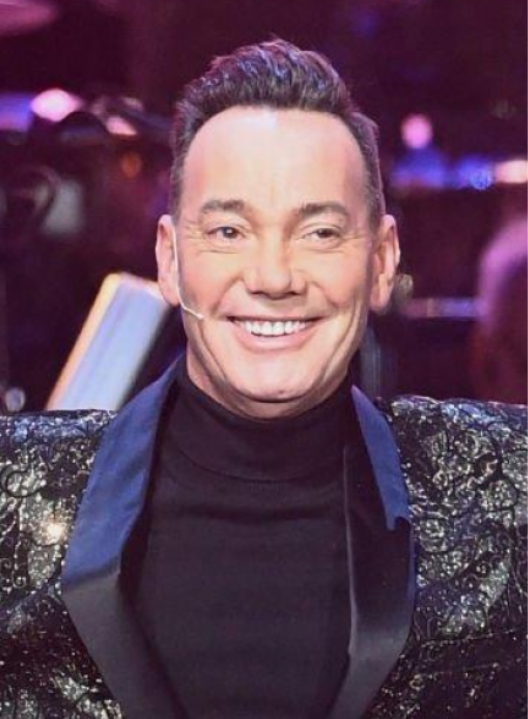
Craig Revel Horwood

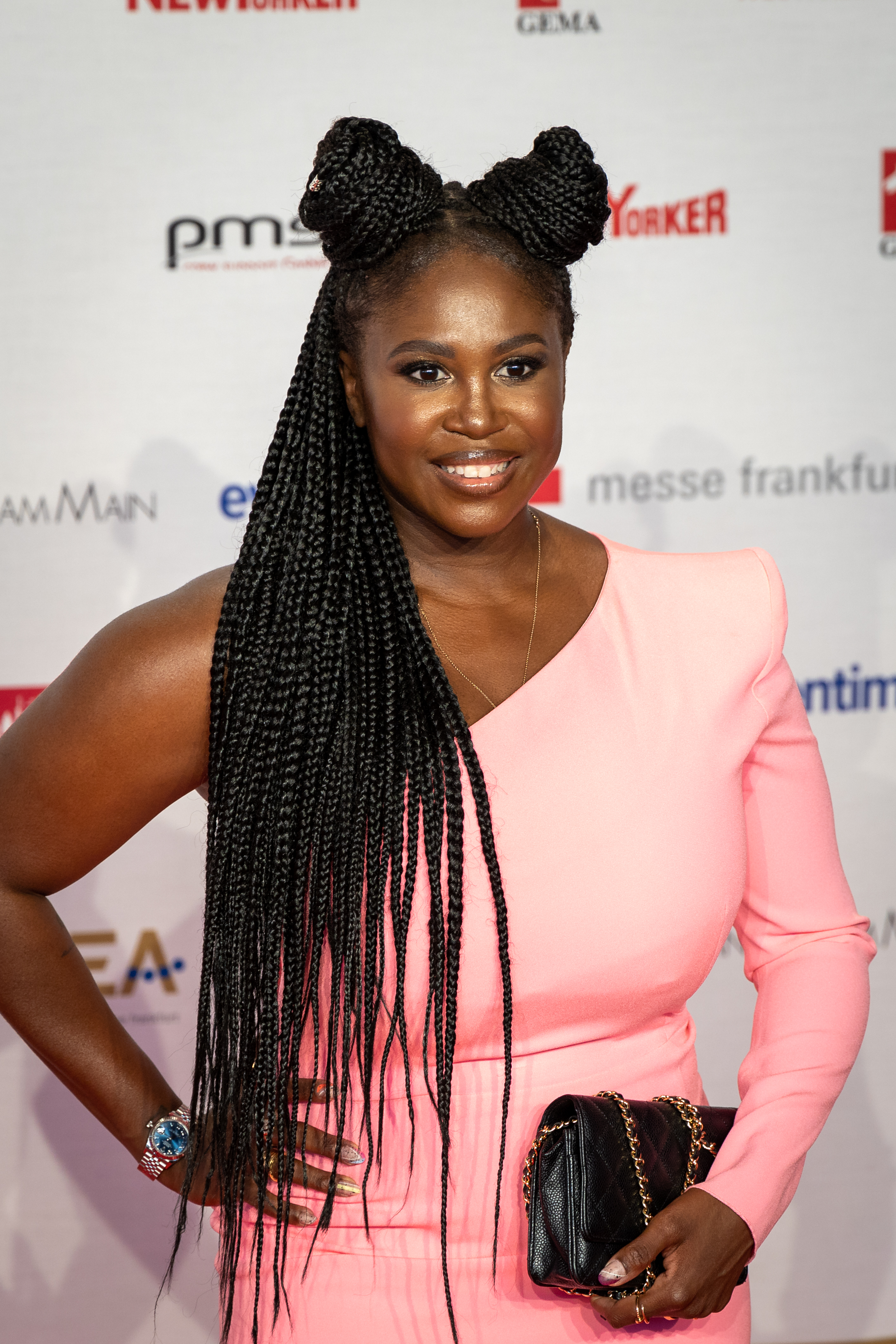
Motsi Mabuse

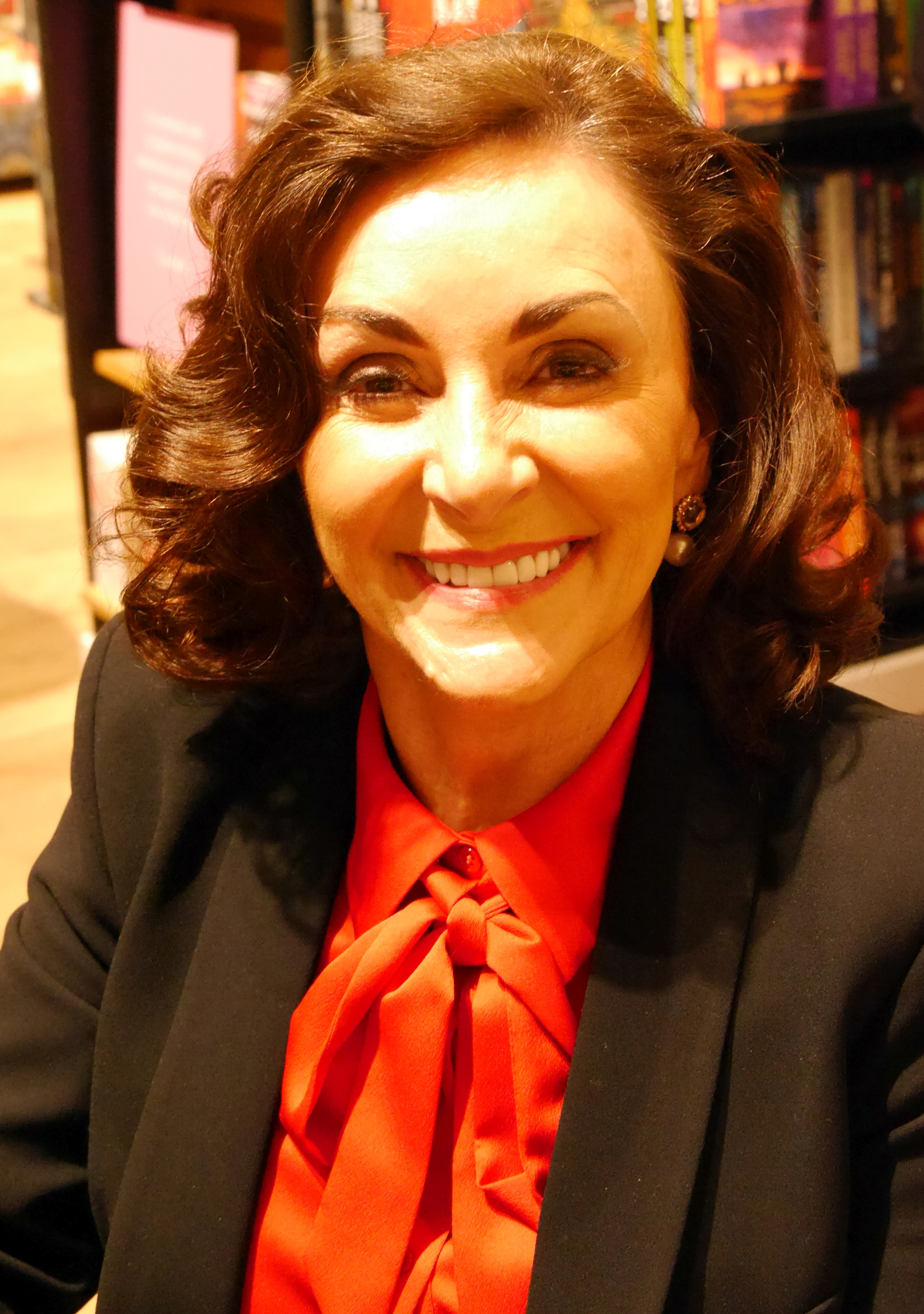
Shirley Ballas

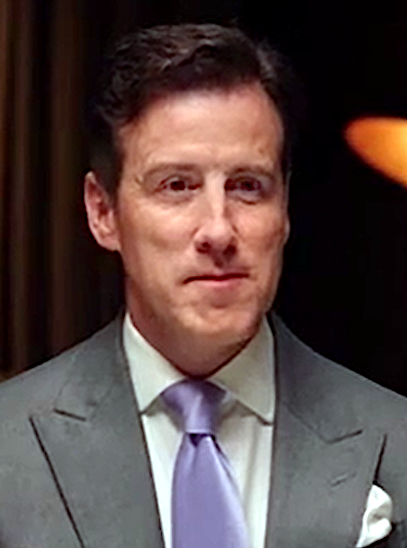
Anton Du Beke

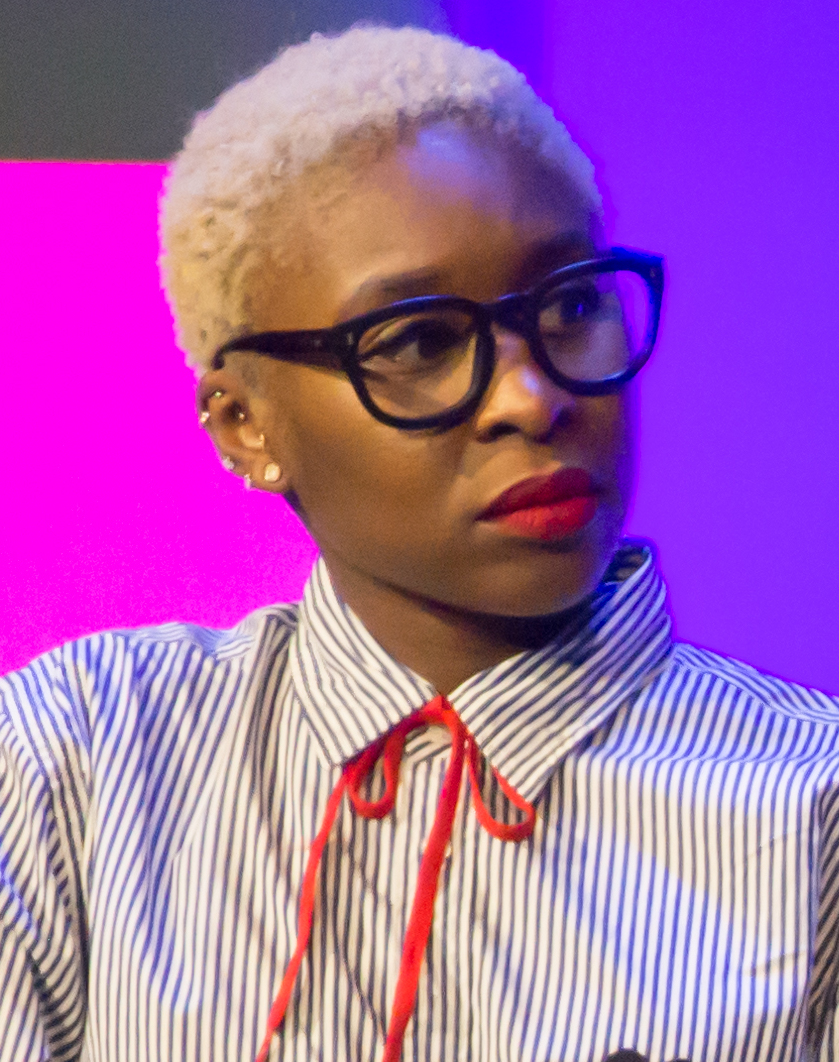
Cynthia Erivo (Guest)

The couples dance each week in a live show. The judges score each performance out of ten. The couples are then ranked according to the judges' scores and given points according to their rank, with the lowest scored couple receiving one point, and the highest scored couple receiving the most points (the maximum number of points available depends on the number of couples remaining in the competition). The public are also invited to vote for their favourite couples, and the couples are ranked again according to the number of votes they receive, again receiving points; the couple with the fewest votes receiving one point, and the couple with the most votes receiving the most points.

The points for judges' score and public vote are then added together, and the two couples with the fewest points are placed in the bottom two. If two couples have equal points, the points from the public vote are given precedence. As with the previous series, the bottom two couples have to perform a dance-off on the results show. Based on that performance alone, each judge then votes on which couple should stay and which couple should leave, with Shirley Ballas, as head judge, having the last and deciding vote.

== Professional dancers ==
In March 2021, the BBC announced that all sixteen professional dancers from the eighteenth series would return in 2021. However, in June, the BBC revealed that Janette Manrara and Anton Du Beke would not be reprising their dancing roles: Manrara was announced as a new co-host of It Takes Two, succeeding Zoe Ball, while Du Beke would replace Bruno Tonioli on the judging panel.

In July 2021, the BBC announced that four new professional dancers would be joining the cast: Italian Latin and Ballroom Champion Nikita Kuzmin, who was also a professional dancer on the German version of the show in 2020; South African Latin Champion Cameron Lombard, who was also a finalist on South Africa's Got Talent in 2012; Polish Open Latin Champion Jowita Przystał, who won The Greatest Dancer in 2020; and World Junior Latin American Champion Kai Widdrington, who was also a former professional on the Irish version of the show.

Graziano Di Prima received a celebrity partner for the first time since the sixteenth series, while Nadiya Bychkova and Neil Jones received a celebrity partner for the first time since the seventeenth series. Nancy Xu received a celebrity partner for the first time, as did Nikita Kuzmin and Kai Widdrington, while Luba Mushtuk, Cameron Lombard, and Jowita Przystał did not receive a partner.

== Couples ==
This series featured fifteen celebrity contestants. On 4 August 2021, the first three celebrities participating were announced: Tom Fletcher, AJ Odudu, and Robert Webb. The following day, it was announced that John Whaite would be paired as part of the first male same-sex couple in Strictly Come Dancing history. Celebrity contestants continued to be revealed until 13 August 2021, when the full line-up was announced. Rose Ayling-Ellis was also the first deaf contestant to appear on the programme. On 13 October, it was announced that Robert Webb had been advised to withdraw from the competition due to health problems. On 17 December, the day before the final, it was announced that AJ Odudu had withdrawn from the competition after suffering ligament damage in her right ankle.

Celebrity	Notability	Professional partner	Status
Nina Wadia	Stage & screen actress	Neil Jones	Eliminated 1st on 3 October 2021
Katie McGlynn	Coronation Street actress	Gorka Márquez	Eliminated 2nd on 10 October 2021
Robert Webb	Comedian & actor	Dianne Buswell	Withdrew on 13 October 2021
Greg Wise	Film & television actor	Karen Hauer	Eliminated 3rd on 17 October 2021
Ugo Monye	England rugby player & pundit	Oti Mabuse	Eliminated 4th on 24 October 2021
Judi Love	Comedian & Loose Women panellist	Graziano Di Prima	Eliminated 5th on 31 October 2021
Adam Peaty	Olympic swimmer	Katya Jones	Eliminated 6th on 7 November 2021
Sara Davies	Dragons' Den investor & businesswoman	Aljaž Škorjanec	Eliminated 7th on 14 November 2021
Tom Fletcher	McFly singer	Amy Dowden	Eliminated 8th on 21 November 2021
Tilly Ramsay	Chef & television presenter	Nikita Kuzmin	Eliminated 9th on 28 November 2021
Dan Walker	BBC Breakfast presenter & journalist	Nadiya Bychkova	Eliminated 10th on 5 December 2021
Rhys Stephenson	CBBC presenter	Nancy Xu	Eliminated 11th on 12 December 2021
AJ Odudu	Television presenter	Kai Widdrington	Withdrew on 17 December 2021
John Whaite	Baker & television presenter	Johannes Radebe	Runners-up on 18 December 2021
Rose Ayling-Ellis	EastEnders actress	Giovanni Pernice	Winners on 18 December 2021

== Scoring chart ==
The highest score each week is indicated in bold green with a dagger (†), while the lowest score each week is indicated in italicized red with a double-dagger (‡).

Color key:

Winners
Runners-up
Bottom two
Excused from competition for the week
Withdrew from competition
Eliminated

Strictly Come Dancing (series 19) - Weekly scores
Couple	Pl.	Week													
Couple	Pl.	1	2	1+2	3	4	5	6	7	8	9	10	11	12	13
Rose & Giovanni	1st	22	26	48	36	27	37	**40**†	32	39	37	33	**39**†	39+40=**79**†	39+40+40=**119**† (Note: This couple finished in first place.)
John & Johannes	2nd	30	31	61	**39**†	29	**38**†	33	35	38	32	**39**†	32	39+39=78 (Note: This couple was in the bottom two, but was not eliminated.)	39+40+40=**119**† (Note: This couple finished in second place.)
AJ & Kai	3rd	**34**†	31	**65**†	35	28	35	37	**39**†	28‡	38	36	30‡	40+39=**79**†	(Note: This couple withdrew from the competition.)
Rhys & Nancy	4th	27	30	57	37	31	32	33	34	**40**†	32	35	**39**†	36+38=74‡ (Note: This couple was eliminated.)	
Dan & Nadiya	5th	24	26	50	21	26	28	27	28	29	31‡	31	31		
Tilly & Nikita	6th	21	**34**†	55	27	32	36	35	31	29	**40**†	30‡			
Tom & Amy	7th	21	(Note: This couple was excused from competition due to illness or injury, and was granted a bye to the following week.)		32	29	34	29	38	30	31‡				
Sara & Aljaž	8th	17‡	**34**†	51	28	**36**†	25	23‡	33	32					
Adam & Katya	9th	30	19	49	20‡	32	29	29	27‡						
Judi & Graziano	10th	24	25	49	24	24		25							
Ugo & Oti	11th	18	25	43	31		20‡								
Greg & Karen	12th	24	23	47	26	19‡									
Robert & Dianne	13th	20	27	47	25										
Katie & Gorka	14th	22	21	43	24										
Nina & Neil	15th	24	18‡	42‡											

=== Average chart ===
This table only counts for dances scored on a traditional 40-point scale.

Couple	Rank by average	Total points	Number of dances	Total average
John & Johannes	1st	573	16	35.8
Rose & Giovanni	2nd	566	16	35.4
AJ & Kai	3rd	450	13	34.6
Rhys & Nancy	4th	444	13	34.2
Tilly & Nikita	5th	315	10	31.5
Tom & Amy	6th	244	8	30.5
Sara & Aljaž	7th	228	8	28.5
Dan & Nadiya	8th	302	11	27.5
Adam & Katya	9th	186	7	26.6
Judi & Graziano	10th	122	5	24.4
Robert & Dianne	11th	72	3	24.0
Ugo & Oti	12th	94	4	23.5
Greg & Karen	13th	92	4	23.0
Katie & Gorka	14th	67	3	22.3
Nina & Neil	15th	42	2	21.0

== Weekly scores ==
Unless indicated otherwise, individual judges scores in the charts below (given in parentheses) are listed in this order from left to right: Craig Revel Horwood, Motsi Mabuse, Shirley Ballas, Anton Du Beke.

=== Week 1 ===
There was no elimination this week; all scores and votes carried over to the following week. Couples are listed in the order they performed.

Couple	Scores	Dance	Music
Tom & Amy	21 (4, 7, 5, 5)	Cha-cha-cha	"September" — Earth, Wind & Fire
Tilly & Nikita	21 (5, 5, 6, 5)	Waltz	"Consequences" — Camila Cabello
Ugo & Oti	18 (3, 5, 5, 5)	Samba	"Iko Iko (My Bestie)" — Justin Wellington, feat. Small Jam
Rhys & Nancy	27 (6, 7, 7, 7)	Viennese waltz	"End of the Road" — Boyz II Men
Sara & Aljaž	17 (3, 5, 5, 4)	Cha-cha-cha	"The Boss" — Diana Ross
Dan & Nadiya	24 (5, 5, 7, 7)	Quickstep	"Everybody Needs Somebody to Love" — The Blues Brothers
Rose & Giovanni	22 (6, 6, 4, 6)	Jive	"Shake It Off" — Taylor Swift
Katie & Gorka	22 (6, 5, 5, 6)	Tango	"Black Hole" — Griff
Robert & Dianne	20 (6, 4, 4, 6)	Cha-cha-cha	"Rasputin" — Boney M.
Greg & Karen	24 (6, 6, 5, 7)	American Smooth	"That's Life" — Frank Sinatra
Nina & Neil	24 (5, 5, 7, 7)	Samba	"Mi Gente" — J Balvin & Willy William, feat. Beyoncé
John & Johannes	30 (7, 7, 8, 8)	Tango	"Blue Monday" — New Order
Judi & Graziano	24 (6, 6, 6, 6)	American Smooth	"Chain of Fools" — Aretha Franklin
AJ & Kai	34 (8, 8, 9, 9)	Jive	"Gold Dust" — DJ Fresh
Adam & Katya	30 (7, 7, 8, 8)	Cha-cha-cha	"Beggin'" — Måneskin

=== Week 2 ===
Musical guests:

- Tom Grennan — "Something Better"
- Griff — "One Night"

After Tom Fletcher and Amy Dowden tested positive for COVID-19, they were unable to perform on the live show. Under the rules of the show, he was granted a bye to the following week.

Couples are listed in the order they performed.

Couple	Scores	Dance	Music	Result
Rhys & Nancy	30 (7, 8, 8, 7)	Cha-cha-cha	"Reach Out I'll Be There" — Human Nature	Safe
Nina & Neil	18 (3, 5, 5, 5)	Tango	"Would I Lie to You?" — Eurythmics	Eliminated
Adam & Katya	19 (4, 5, 5, 5)	Quickstep	"Are You Gonna Be My Girl" — Jet	Safe
Katie & Gorka	21 (4, 6, 5, 6)	Jive	"Good 4 U" — Olivia Rodrigo	Bottom two
Greg & Karen	23 (3, 6, 7, 7)	Couple's choice	"If You Could Read My Mind" — Ultra Naté, Amber & Jocelyn Enriquez	Safe
John & Johannes	31 (8, 8, 8, 7)	Cha-cha-cha	"Starstruck" — Years & Years	Safe
AJ & Kai	31 (7, 9, 7, 8)	Foxtrot	"Tears Dry on Their Own" — Amy Winehouse	Safe
Judi & Graziano	25 (6, 7, 6, 6)	Samba	"Get Busy" — Sean Paul	Safe
Robert & Dianne	27 (7, 7, 6, 7)	Tango	"La cumparsita" — Machiko Ozawa	Safe
Rose & Giovanni	26 (6, 7, 6, 7)	Salsa	"Cuba" — Gibson Brothers	Safe
Sara & Aljaž	34 (8, 8, 9, 9)	Foxtrot	"Dream a Little Dream of Me" — Cass Elliot	Safe
Dan & Nadiya	26 (7, 6, 6, 7)	Paso doble	"Giant" — Calvin Harris & Rag'n'Bone Man	Safe
Ugo & Oti	25 (5, 7, 7, 6)	Quickstep	"Bring Me Sunshine" — The Jive Aces	Safe
Tilly & Nikita	34 (8, 9, 9, 8)	Charleston	"Yes Sir, That's My Baby" — Firehouse Five Plus Two	Safe

Judges' votes to save

- Horwood: Katie & Gorka
- Mabuse: Katie & Gorka
- Du Beke: Nina & Neil
- Ballas: Katie & Gorka

=== Week 3: Movie Week ===
Musical guest: Ben Platt — "You Will Be Found" (from Dear Evan Hansen)

Couples are listed in the order they performed.

Couple	Scores	Dance	Music	Film	Result
Judi & Graziano	24 (4, 7, 7, 6)	Charleston	"When You're Good to Mama"	Chicago	Bottom two
Dan & Nadiya	21 (3, 5, 7, 6)	Foxtrot	"Once Upon a Dream"	Sleeping Beauty	Safe
Sara & Aljaž	28 (7, 7, 7, 7)	Samba	"Best Years of Our Lives"	Shrek	Safe
AJ & Kai	35 (8, 9, 9, 9)	American Smooth	"I Have Nothing"	The Bodyguard	Safe
Robert & Dianne	25 (6, 6, 7, 6)	Quickstep	"The Muppet Show Theme"	The Muppets	Safe
Greg & Karen	26 (6, 6, 7, 7)	Paso doble	"James Bond Theme"	Dr. No	Safe
Tilly & Nikita	27 (6, 7, 7, 7)	Jive	"The Nicest Kids in Town"	Hairspray	Safe
Rose & Giovanni	36 (9, 9, 9, 9)	Foxtrot	"Rose's Theme"	Titanic	Safe
Ugo & Oti	31 (7, 8, 8, 8)	Couple's choice	"You're Welcome"	Moana	Safe
Tom & Amy	32 (8, 8, 8, 8)	Jive	"Johnny B. Goode"	Back to the Future	Safe
Adam & Katya	20 (4, 5, 5, 6)	Rumba	"I See You"	Avatar	Safe
Katie & Gorka	24 (5, 7, 6, 6)	American Smooth	"Cruella de Vil"	Cruella	Eliminated
Rhys & Nancy	37 (9, 10, 9, 9)	Couple's choice	"Spider-Man"	Spider-Man: Into the Spider-Verse	Safe
John & Johannes	39 (9, 10, 10, 10)	Paso doble	"He's a Pirate"	Pirates of the Caribbean: The Curse of the Black Pearl	Safe

Judges' votes to save

- Horwood: Judi & Graziano
- Mabuse: Judi & Graziano
- Du Beke: Katie & Gorka
- Ballas: Judi & Graziano

=== Week 4 ===
Musical guest: Westlife — "Starlight"

After Ugo Monye sustained a back injury, he was unable to perform on the live show. Under the rules of the show, he was granted a bye to the following week. Additionally, Robert Webb and Dianne Buswell withdrew from the competition earlier in the week due to Webb's ill health.

Couples are listed in the order they performed.

Couple	Scores	Dance	Music	Result
Rose & Giovanni	27 (7, 6, 6, 8)	Cha-cha-cha	"Raspberry Beret" — Prince & The Revolution	Safe
Tom & Amy	29 (7, 8, 7, 7)	Foxtrot	"Fly Me to the Moon" — Frank Sinatra	Safe
Tilly & Nikita	32 (6, 8, 9, 9)	Paso doble	"Diablo Rojo" — Rodrigo y Gabriela	Safe
Greg & Karen	19 (3, 5, 5, 6)	Samba	"Macarena" — Los del Río	Eliminated
John & Johannes	29 (6, 7, 8, 8)	American Smooth	"I Knew You Were Waiting (For Me)" — Aretha Franklin & George Michael	Safe
Rhys & Nancy	31 (8, 8, 7, 8)	Salsa	"Butter" — BTS	Safe
Sara & Aljaž	36 (9, 9, 9, 9)	Tango	"Por una Cabeza" — Carlos Gardel	Safe
Dan & Nadiya	26 (5, 7, 7, 7)	Cha-cha-cha	"U Can't Touch This" — MC Hammer & "Super Freak" — Rick James	Safe
Judi & Graziano	24 (4, 6, 7, 7)	Waltz	"Hero" — Mariah Carey	Bottom two
Adam & Katya	32 (8, 8, 8, 8)	Argentine tango	"Tango in the Night" — Fleetwood Mac	Safe
AJ & Kai	28 (5, 7, 8, 8)	Samba	"Don't Go Yet" — Camila Cabello	Safe

Judges' votes to save

- Horwood: Judi & Graziano
- Mabuse: Judi & Graziano
- Du Beke: Judi & Graziano
- Ballas: Did not vote, but would have voted to save Greg & Karen

=== Week 5 ===
Musical guests: Craig David & MNEK — "Who You Are"

After Judi Love tested positive for COVID-19, she was unable to perform on the live show. Under the rules of the show, she was granted a bye to the following week.

Couples are listed in the order they performed.

Couple	Scores	Dance	Music	Result
Dan & Nadiya	28 (7, 7, 7, 7)	Viennese waltz	"She's Always a Woman" — Billy Joel	Safe
Adam & Katya	29 (7, 7, 8, 7)	Samba	"Faith" — George Michael	Safe
Sara & Aljaž	25 (4, 7, 7, 7)	Rumba	"You're Still the One" — Shania Twain	Safe
Tom & Amy	34 (8, 9, 9, 8)	Salsa	"Watermelon Sugar" — Harry Styles	Safe
Tilly & Nikita	36 (9, 9, 9, 9)	Foxtrot	"Little Things" — One Direction	Safe
AJ & Kai	35 (8, 8, 10, 9)	Argentine tango	"Edge of Seventeen" — Stevie Nicks	Safe
Ugo & Oti	20 (3, 6, 5, 6)	Rumba	"Leave the Door Open" — Silk Sonic	Eliminated
John & Johannes	38 (9, 9, 10, 10)	Charleston	"Milord" — Édith Piaf	Safe
Rose & Giovanni	37 (9, 10, 9, 9)	Viennese waltz	"Fallin'" — Alicia Keys	Safe
Rhys & Nancy	32 (8, 8, 8, 8)	American Smooth	"I've Got the World on a String" — Michael Bublé	Bottom two

Judges' votes to save

- Horwood: Rhys & Nancy
- Mabuse: Rhys & Nancy
- Du Beke: Rhys & Nancy
- Ballas: Did not vote, but would have voted to save Rhys & Nancy

=== Week 6: Halloween Week ===
Musical guest: Gregory Porter — "Dry Bones"

Couples are listed in the order they performed.

Couple	Scores	Dance	Music	Result
John & Johannes	33 (8, 8, 9, 8)	Quickstep	"Bad Moon Rising" — Creedence Clearwater Revival	Safe
AJ & Kai	37 (9, 10, 9, 9)	Viennese waltz	"Dangerous Woman" — Ariana Grande	Safe
Dan & Nadiya	27 (5, 8, 7, 7)	Jive	"Rock Lobster" — The B-52's	Safe
Rhys & Nancy	33 (7, 9, 9, 8)	Paso doble	"The Eve of the War" — Jeff Wayne	Safe
Sara & Aljaž	23 (4, 7, 6, 6)	Couple's choice	"Queen of the Night" — Whitney Houston	Safe
Rose & Giovanni	40 (10, 10, 10, 10)	Tango	"Shivers" — Ed Sheeran	Safe
Tilly & Nikita	35 (8, 9, 9, 9)	Cha-cha-cha	"Spooky Movies" — Gary S. Paxton	Safe
Adam & Katya	29 (6, 8, 8, 7)	Viennese waltz	"Moonlight Sonata" — Ludwig van Beethoven	Bottom two
Judi & Graziano	25 (4, 7, 7, 7)	Cha-cha-cha	"Physical" — Olivia Newton-John	Eliminated
Tom & Amy	29 (7, 8, 7, 7)	Tango	"Highway to Hell" — AC/DC	Safe

Judges' votes to save

- Horwood: Adam & Katya
- Mabuse: Adam & Katya
- Du Beke: Adam & Katya
- Ballas: Did not vote, but would have voted to save Adam & Katya

=== Week 7 ===
Musical guest: The Script — "Superheroes"

Couples are listed in the order they performed.

Couple	Scores	Dance	Music	Result
Adam & Katya	27 (6, 7, 7, 7)	Jive	"Little Bitty Pretty One" — Frankie Lymon	Eliminated
Rose & Giovanni	32 (8, 8, 8, 8)	Samba	"Cinema Italiano" — Kate Hudson	Safe
Tom & Amy	38 (9, 10, 10, 9)	Paso doble	"Amparito Roca" — Jaime Teixidor	Safe
Rhys & Nancy	34 (7, 9, 9, 9)	Quickstep	"What a Man Gotta Do" — Jonas Brothers	Safe
Tilly & Nikita	31 (8, 8, 7, 8)	Tango	"Kings & Queens" — Ava Max	Bottom two
Dan & Nadiya	28 (6, 7, 8, 7)	Couple's choice	"Classic" — MKTO	Safe
John & Johannes	35 (8, 8, 10, 9)	Rumba	"Shape of My Heart" — Sting	Safe
AJ & Kai	39 (9, 10, 10, 10)	Charleston	"Don't Bring Lulu" — Dorothy Provine	Safe
Sara & Aljaž	33 (8, 8, 8, 9)	Quickstep	"9 to 5" — Dolly Parton	Safe

Judges' votes to save

- Horwood: Tilly & Nikita
- Mabuse: Tilly & Nikita
- Du Beke: Tilly & Nikita
- Ballas: Did not vote, but would have voted to save Adam & Katya

=== Week 8 ===
Musical guest: James Blunt — "Goodbye My Lover"

Couples are listed in the order they performed.

Couple	Scores	Dance	Music	Result
Tilly & Nikita	29 (7, 7, 7, 8)	Quickstep	"I Won't Dance" — Damita Jo	Bottom two
AJ & Kai	28 (6, 7, 7, 8)	Paso doble	"Game of Survival" — Ruelle	Safe
Dan & Nadiya	29 (4, 8, 8, 9)	American Smooth	"King of the Road" — The Proclaimers	Safe
Rhys & Nancy	40 (10, 10, 10, 10)	Charleston	"The Charleston" — Bob Wilson and his Varsity Rhythm Boys	Safe
Sara & Aljaž	32 (7, 8, 8, 9)	Argentine tango	"No More Tears (Enough Is Enough)" — Barbra Streisand & Donna Summer	Eliminated
John & Johannes	38 (9, 10, 10, 9)	Samba	"Acuyuyé" — Dark Latin Groove	Safe
Tom & Amy	30 (7, 8, 7, 8)	Viennese waltz	"Iris" — Goo Goo Dolls	Safe
Rose & Giovanni	39 (9, 10, 10, 10)	Couple's choice	"Symphony" — Clean Bandit, feat. Zara Larsson	Safe

Judges' votes to save

- Horwood: Tilly & Nikita
- Mabuse: Tilly & Nikita
- Du Beke: Tilly & Nikita
- Ballas: Did not vote, but would have voted to save Tilly & Nikita

=== Week 9: Musicals Week ===
Individual judges scores in the chart below (given in parentheses) are listed in this order from left to right: Cynthia Erivo, Motsi Mabuse, Shirley Ballas, Anton Du Beke.

Musical guests: Max Harwood & The Feeling — "Out of the Darkness (A Place Where We Belong)" (from Everybody's Talking About Jamie)

On 15 November, it was announced that Craig Revel Horwood had tested positive for COVID-19 and was self-isolating following the latest government guidelines. On 19 November, it was announced that Cynthia Erivo would replace him on the judging panel for the week.

Couples are listed in the order they performed.

Couple	Scores	Dance	Music	Musical	Result
AJ & Kai	38 (9, 10, 10, 9)	Waltz	"Edelweiss"	The Sound of Music	Safe
Rhys & Nancy	32 (8, 8, 8, 8)	Jive	"Footloose"	Footloose	Bottom two
Tom & Amy	31 (7, 8, 8, 8)	Couple's choice	"On My Own"	Les Misérables	Eliminated
Rose & Giovanni	37 (10, 9, 9, 9)	Quickstep	"Love Is an Open Door"	Frozen	Safe
John & Johannes	32 (8, 8, 8, 8)	Viennese waltz	"Chim Chim Cher-ee"	Mary Poppins	Safe
Tilly & Nikita	40 (10, 10, 10, 10)	Couple's choice	"Revolting Children"	Matilda the Musical	Safe
Dan & Nadiya	31 (7, 7, 9, 8)	Charleston	"Good Morning"	Singin' in the Rain	Safe

Judges' votes to save

- Erivo: Rhys & Nancy
- Mabuse: Rhys & Nancy
- Du Beke: Rhys & Nancy
- Ballas: Did not vote, but would have voted to save Tom & Amy

=== Week 10 ===
Individual judges scores in the chart below (given in parentheses) are listed in this order from left to right: Craig Revel Horwood, Cynthia Erivo, Shirley Ballas, Anton Du Beke.

Musical guests: Years & Years — "Sweet Talker"

On 26 November, it was announced that Motsi Mabuse had come into contact with someone who had tested positive for COVID-19. While Mabuse was doubly vaccinated, which would have allowed an exemption from the self-isolation guidelines, the British government did not recognise her vaccines, so she could not travel back from Germany. Cynthia Erivo returned to the judging panel for the week.

Couples are listed in the order they performed.

Couple	Scores	Dance	Music	Result
Rose & Giovanni	33 (8, 8, 8, 9)	Paso doble	"California Dreamin'" — Sia	Safe
Dan & Nadiya	31 (6, 9, 8, 8)	Rumba	"Desperado" — Eagles	Safe
AJ & Kai	36 (9, 8, 10, 9)	Couple's choice	"Make Me Feel" — Janelle Monáe	Safe
Rhys & Nancy	35 (7, 9, 10, 9)	Waltz	"You Light Up My Life" — Whitney Houston	Bottom two
Tilly & Nikita	30 (7, 7, 8, 8)	Samba	"Levitating" — Dua Lipa	Eliminated
John & Johannes	39 (9, 10, 10, 10)	Argentine tango	"The 5th" — David Garrett	Safe

Judges' votes to save

- Horwood: Rhys & Nancy
- Erivo: Rhys & Nancy
- Du Beke: Rhys & Nancy
- Ballas: Did not vote, but would have voted to save Rhys & Nancy

=== Week 11: Quarter-final ===
Musical guest: JLS — "Postcard"

Couples are listed in the order they performed.

Couple	Scores	Dance	Music	Result
John & Johannes	32 (7, 8, 8, 9)	Salsa	"We Are Family" — Sister Sledge	Safe
Rhys & Nancy	39 (9, 10, 10, 10)	Argentine tango	"In the Air Tonight" — Phil Collins	Safe
Rose & Giovanni	39 (9, 10, 10, 10)	American Smooth	"This Will Be (An Everlasting Love)" — Natalie Cole	Safe
Dan & Nadiya	31 (7, 8, 9, 7)	Tango	"Santa María (del Buen Ayre)" — Gotan Project	Eliminated
AJ & Kai	30 (7, 8, 8, 7)	Salsa	"Rhythm Is Gonna Get You" & "Get on Your Feet" — Gloria Estefan	Bottom two

Judges' votes to save

- Horwood: AJ & Kai
- Mabuse: AJ & Kai
- Du Beke: AJ & Kai
- Ballas: Did not vote, but would have voted to save AJ & Kai

=== Week 12: Semi-final ===
Each couple performed two routines, and are listed in the order they performed.

Couple	Scores	Dance	Music	Result
Rhys & Nancy	36 (9, 9, 9, 9)	Tango	"One Vision" — Queen	Eliminated
Rhys & Nancy	38 (9, 10, 10, 9)	Samba	"It Had Better Be Tonight (Meglio stasera)" — Michael Bublé	Eliminated
AJ & Kai	40 (10, 10, 10, 10)	Quickstep	"Sing, Sing, Sing (With a Swing)" — Benny Goodman	Safe
AJ & Kai	39 (9, 10, 10, 10)	Rumba	"Show Me Heaven" — Maria McKee	Safe
John & Johannes	39 (9, 10, 10, 10)	Couple's choice	"Hometown Glory" — Adele	Bottom two
John & Johannes	39 (9, 10, 10, 10)	Jive	"Higher Power" — Coldplay	Bottom two
Rose & Giovanni	39 (9, 10, 10, 10)	Waltz	"How Long Will I Love You?" — Ellie Goulding	Safe
Rose & Giovanni	40 (10, 10, 10, 10)	Argentine tango	"A Evaristo Carriego" — Eduardo Rovira	Safe

Judges' votes to save

- Horwood: John & Johannes
- Mabuse: John & Johannes
- Du Beke: John & Johannes
- Ballas: Did not vote, but would have voted to save John & Johannes

=== Week 13: Final ===
Musical guest: Ed Sheeran — "Bad Habits"

AJ Odudu and Kai Widdrington withdrew from the final after Odudu suffered ligament damage in her right ankle.

Each couple performed three routines: one chosen by the judges, their favourite dance of the season, and their showdance routine. Couples are listed in the order they performed.

Couple	Scores	Dance	Music	Result
Rose & Giovanni	39 (9, 10, 10, 10)	Quickstep	"Love Is an Open Door" — from Frozen	Winners
Rose & Giovanni	40 (10, 10, 10, 10)	Couple's choice	"Symphony" — Clean Bandit, feat. Zara Larsson	Winners
Rose & Giovanni	40 (10, 10, 10, 10)	Showdance	"The Rose" — Bette Midler	Winners
John & Johannes	39 (9, 10, 10, 10)	Rumba	"Shape of My Heart" — Sting	Runners-up
John & Johannes	40 (10, 10, 10, 10)	Paso doble	"He's a Pirate" — from Pirates of the Caribbean: The Curse of the Black Pearl	Runners-up
John & Johannes	40 (10, 10, 10, 10)	Showdance	"You've Got the Love" — Florence and the Machine	Runners-up

== Dance chart ==
The couples performed the following each week:

- Weeks 1–11: One unlearned dance
- Week 12 (Semi-final): Two unlearned dances
- Week 13 (Final): Judges' choice, favourite dance & showdance

Strictly Come Dancing (series 19) - Dance chart
Couple	Week															
Couple	1	2	3	4	5	6	7	8	9	10	11	12		13		
Rose & Giovanni	Jive	Salsa	Foxtrot	Cha-cha-cha	Viennese waltz	Tango	Samba	Couple's choice	Quickstep	Paso doble	American Smooth	Waltz	Argentine tango	Quickstep	Couple's choice	Showdance
John & Johannes	Tango	Cha-cha-cha	Paso doble	American Smooth	Charleston	Quickstep	Rumba	Samba	Viennese waltz	Argentine tango	Salsa	Couple's choice	Jive	Rumba	Paso doble	Showdance
AJ & Kai	Jive	Foxtrot	American Smooth	Samba	Argentine tango	Viennese waltz	Charleston	Paso doble	Waltz	Couple's choice	Salsa	Quickstep	Rumba			
Rhys & Nancy	Viennese waltz	Cha-cha-cha	Couple's choice	Salsa	American Smooth	Paso doble	Quickstep	Charleston	Jive	Waltz	Argentine tango	Tango	Samba			
Dan & Nadiya	Quickstep	Paso doble	Foxtrot	Cha-cha-cha	Viennese waltz	Jive	Couple's choice	American Smooth	Charleston	Rumba	Tango					
Tilly & Nikita	Waltz	Charleston	Jive	Paso doble	Foxtrot	Cha-cha-cha	Tango	Quickstep	Couple's choice	Samba						
Tom & Amy	Cha-cha-cha		Jive	Foxtrot	Salsa	Tango	Paso doble	Viennese waltz	Couple's choice							
Sara & Aljaž	Cha-cha-cha	Foxtrot	Samba	Tango	Rumba	Couple's choice	Quickstep	Argentine tango								
Adam & Katya	Cha-cha-cha	Quickstep	Rumba	Argentine tango	Samba	Viennese waltz	Jive									
Judi & Graziano	American Smooth	Samba	Charleston	Waltz		Cha-cha-cha										
Ugo & Oti	Samba	Quickstep	Couple's choice		Rumba											
Greg & Karen	American Smooth	Couple's choice	Paso doble	Samba												
Robert & Dianne	Cha-cha-cha	Tango	Quickstep													
Katie & Gorka	Tango	Jive	American Smooth													
Nina & Neil	Samba	Tango														

== Reception ==
Series 19 received positive reviews from fans and critics. Lottie Townend of Glasgow University Guardian said that "the series provided a place of escape and comfort from the difficulties of the outside world. You become personally invested in each contestant’s journey, root for their success and feel the warmth through their shared love for dance". Jane Rackham of Radio Times was positive towards this season's unpredictability, writing: "This must be the most unpredictable series of Strictly ever. And not only because several participants had to miss a show after testing positive for Covid".

== Ratings ==
Weekly ratings for each show on BBC One. All ratings are provided by BARB.

Episode	Date	Official rating (millions)	Weekly rank for BBC One	Weekly rank for all UK TV	Share
Launch show	18 September	8.51	2	2	44.7%
Week 1	25 September	9.61	2	2	47.9%
Week 2	2 October	9.57	1	1	48.5%
Week 2 results	3 October	8.14	2	3	43.6%
Week 3	9 October	10.07	1	1	51.1%
Week 3 results	10 October	8.38	2	3	44.2%
Week 4	16 October	10.25	1	1	51.0%
Week 4 results	17 October	8.22	2	3	43.2%
Week 5	23 October	10.46	1	1	52.0%
Week 5 results	24 October	8.81	2	2	43.1%
Week 6	30 October	10.58	1	1	52.5%
Week 6 results	31 October	8.72	2	3	43.7%
Week 7	6 November	10.15	1	1	53.5%
Week 7 results	7 November	8.81	2	3	41.8%
Week 8	13 November	10.09	1	1	51.6%
Week 8 results	14 November	9.18	2	2	45.8%
Week 9	20 November	10.72	1	2	52.3%
Week 9 results	21 November	8.72	2	4	39.1%
Week 10	27 November	10.99	1	1	53.9%
Week 10 results	28 November	9.59	2	4	45.6%
Week 11	4 December	10.16	1	1	50.7%
Week 11 results	5 December	8.99	2	2	42.5%
Week 12	11 December	10.56	1	1	51.0%
Week 12 results	12 December	10.27	2	2	48.8%
Week 13	18 December	12.21	1	1	57.8%
Series average (excl. launch show)	2021	9.72	—N/a	—N/a	48.1%
