= Karim Zeroual =

British television presenter and actor (born 1993)

- Born: 14 November 1993 (age 33); London, England
- Occupations: Television presenter; actor
- Years active: 2011–present

Karim Zeroual (born 14 November 1993) is a British television presenter and actor. He began his career starring in the CBBC series The Sparticle Mystery (2011–2015) and started presenting for the network in 2014.

== Early life ==
Zeroual was born in London to Moroccan parents and raised by his mother. He attended the Sylvia Young Theatre School before going on to train at the Urdang Academy.

== Career ==
Zeroual starred as Sadiq in the CBBC science fiction series The Sparticle Mystery, which ran for three series between 2011 and 2015. He has also appeared on EastEnders, Blue Peter, Top Class, Da Vinci's Demons, Saturday Mash-Up!, Richard Osman's House of Games, Bitesize Daily, Horrible Histories: Gory Games and Remotely Funny. He has been a Children's BBC presenter since 2014, presenting directly from the CBBC HQ. He has fronted Ten Pieces Party Live Lesson events with the BBC National Orchestra of Wales and hosted interviews at CBBC Summer Social events with a range of children’s authors. He has also presented Young Dancer and Wimbledon Live and has performed in London’s West End in musical theatre shows such as The Lion King and Chitty Chitty Bang Bang.

In 2019, he started filming a travel and sport documentary for CBBC titled A Week to Beat the World, in which he takes three British children to countries including Guatemala, Brazil and Japan to play national sports and see if they can beat the locals at their own game. A year later, it was announced that he would be starring in the ninth series of Celebs Go Dating.

In December 2020 he featured on an episode of Michael McIntyre's The Wheel as a specialist on children’s TV.

=== Strictly Come Dancing ===
In 2019, he appeared in the seventeenth series of BBC's Strictly Come Dancing in which he was partnered with professional dancer Amy Dowden. The pair received the first perfect 40 points of the series for their Jive in Week 11 and were runners-up in the competition.

Week #	Dance/Song	Judges' scores					Result
Week #	Dance/Song	Horwood	Mabuse	Ballas	Tonioli	Total	Result
1	Cha-Cha-Cha / "If I Can't Have You"	8	8	7	8	31	No elimination
2	Foxtrot / "The Way You Look Tonight"	8	8	8	8	32	Safe
3	Samba / "Kung Fu Fighting"	6	7	6	7	26	Safe
4	Tango / "Paradise"	9	10	9	10	38	Safe
5	Salsa / "Who Let the Dogs Out?"	8	10	9	9	36	Safe
6	Paso Doble / "Smalltown Boy"	7	7	7	8	29	Safe
7	Quickstep / "Mr. Pinstripe Suit"	9	10	10	10	39	Safe
8	Viennese Waltz / "Give Me Love"	6	8	8	8	30	Safe
9	Charleston / "Happy"	9	10	10	10	39	Safe
10	Contemporary / "Drops of Jupiter"	9	9	10	10	38	Bottom two
11	Jive / "You Can't Stop the Beat"	10	10	10	10	40	Safe
12	Argentine Tango / "Libertango"; American Smooth / "Sweet Caroline"	8; 9	10; 10	9; 9	9; 10	36; 38	Bottom two
13	Quickstep / "Mr. Pinstripe Suit"; Showdance / "A Million Dreams"; Jive / "You Can't Stop the Beat"	10; 9; 10	10; 10; 10	10; 10; 10	10; 10; 10	40; 39; 40	Runner-up

- Blue score awarded by guest judge Alfonso Ribeiro
- Green number indicates Karim & Amy were at the top of the leaderboard
