= Thomas Skinner (businessman) =

British television personality (born 1991)

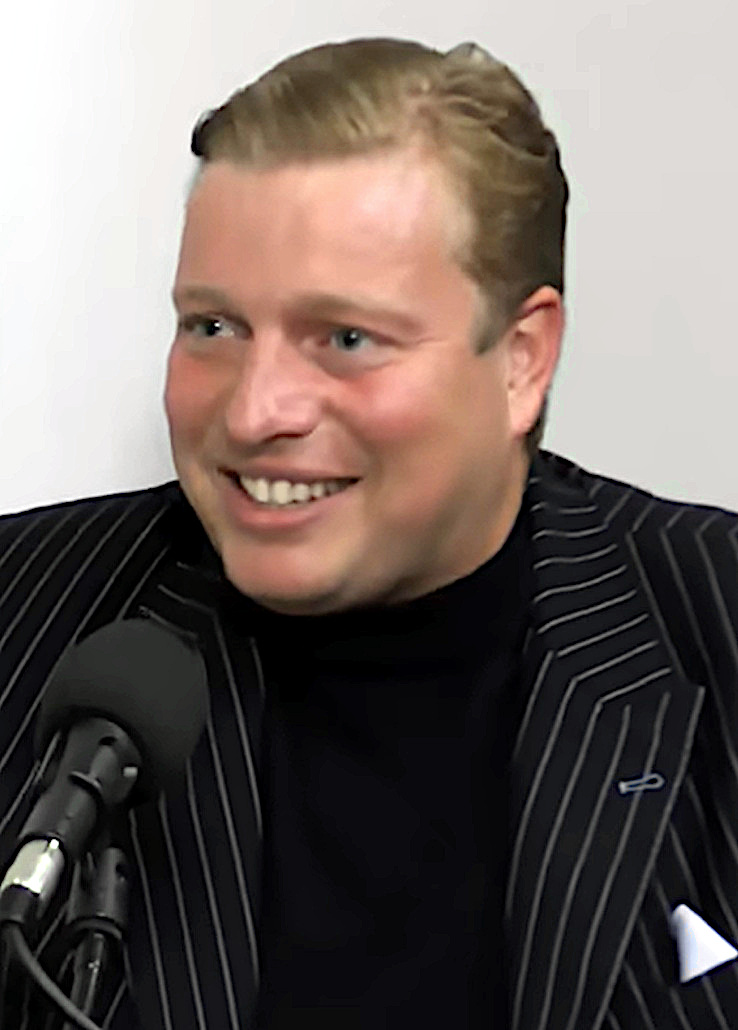
- Skinner in 2021
- Born: Thomas Henry Skinner; 6 February 1991 (age 35); Romford, London, England
- Occupations: Businessman; television personality
- Television: The Apprentice (2019)
- Spouse: Sinéad Chambers (m. 2022)
- Children: 3

Thomas Henry Skinner (born 6 February 1991) is an English businessman and television personality. He was a candidate on the fifteenth series of The Apprentice.

Known for his use of the word "bosh", he has since appeared on other programmes including 8 Out of 10 Cats and Celebrity Masterchef, and has also become known for posting his large and unusual breakfasts at Dino's Cafe in New Spitalfields Market on Twitter and TikTok, receiving millions of views.

== Early life ==
Thomas Henry Skinner was born in Romford on 6 February 1991. His father, Lee Skinner, worked in marketing and was "mega-rich", owning several Lamborghini cars. Thomas was educated privately at Brentwood School, Essex where he received a sports scholarship. He worked as a market trader from the age of 16.

Speaking to Essex Live, Skinner revealed he has a learning difficulty, and said it did not prevent him from being a contestant on The Apprentice: "I'm dyslexic, I can't even fill out a form and I'm no good at paperwork but it didn't matter, and it really helped me build my career."

== Career ==
=== Business ===
In 2019 he was the owner of The Fluffy Pillow Company, selling beds, mattresses and a memory foam pillow of his design. In 2020, during the COVID-19 pandemic, after the owner of the company's pillow manufacturer died of COVID-19, Skinner set up Bosh Beds, specialising in mattresses. He resigned as a director of Bosh Beds in 2022 and the company was later dissolved.

In 2025, the Daily Mirror reported that it "has not paid back a £50,000 Covid bounce back loan" and goes on to state that "Companies House has issued four notices to liquidate the firm with the outstanding debt. Two strike-offs were discontinued, possibly for administrative reasons, and two have been suspended because of an objection."

=== Legal issues ===
In 2011 Skinner was convicted of handling £40,000 in stolen goods as part of his business selling products at markets and possessing 2,000 diazepam tablets. Skinner maintains he was unaware the stock was stolen because it was from a source he did not know.

=== Media and social media ===
In 2019 he became a candidate on the fifteenth series of The Apprentice. He applied for the series after being persuaded by his girlfriend. Skinner was fired by Lord Sugar in week nine.

In 2020 he appeared on the fifteenth series of Celebrity MasterChef.

HarperCollins acquired the rights to publish Skinner's autobiography, Graft: How to Smash Life, from his management agency Press Box PR in June 2023 and the book was published in October.

From 22 to 28 May 2023 he became the voice of Elizabeth line platform announcements between Heathrow and Shenfield, to mark the start of direct services between the stations.

In August 2025, Skinner was announced as a contestant on the twenty-third series of Strictly Come Dancing. He was partnered with Amy Dowden. They were the first couple to be eliminated from the competition in the second week, placing last. Skinner claimed the vote was rigged and is pursuing legal action against the BBC, but the BBC says it is "not aware of any legal complaint".

Beginning in mid-2022, Skinner began posting videos of large and unusual breakfasts, such as Christmas dinner and lasagne, usually eaten at Dino's Cafe on New Spitalfields Market and always ending with his use of the word "bosh".

== Other ventures ==
In September 2026, Misfits Boxing announced that Skinner would partake in an MF–Professional boxing match on the Joey Essex vs. Dapper Laughs undercard. His opponent is Big Stacks and the bout is scheduled for 10 October at the Copper Box Arena in London, England.

== Political views ==
In 2024 Skinner criticised the mayor of London, Sadiq Khan, over knife crime, and accused Khan of having "ruined" London. In 2025 Skinner posted on Twitter that "London has fallen" under Khan's leadership, that "it ain’t safe out there anymore" and "people are scared".

During the 2024 United States presidential election, Skinner expressed support for the Republican Party candidate, Donald Trump, and criticised the British foreign secretary, David Lammy. Skinner stated "I love Trump I think he is brilliant, that's my opinion. I think it's good he is back in charge, it will be good for the UK economy".

In 2025, at the request of the right wing philosopher James Orr, Skinner spoke at a conference called Now and England, organised by the Roger Scruton Legacy Foundation. In his speech titled, "The England I Love", he called for improved childcare and for the police to use more force. He also stated that he was "thinking about giving it a go in politics". New Statesman described the speech as "simple, stirring, populist stuff". Skinner's relationship with Orr led to him being invited to meet the US vice president, JD Vance, whilst Vance was holidaying in England in August 2025.

Skinner appeared in a social media video posted by Robert Jenrick, then a Conservative member of Parliament, about tool theft, and the Conservative Party reportedly view Skinner as part of a potential "posh-bosh alliance" that would tie together traditional Tory voters and the working-class. Reform UK are also keen to gain his support and Dominic Cummings has offered him support to stand as an independent candidate for Mayor of London. In January 2026, Skinner revealed he had joined Reform UK.

== Personal life ==
He married his partner, Sinéad Chambers, in May 2022. Their son was born in October 2020, and their twin daughters were born in June 2023. He had an affair shortly after his marriage. In 2026, it was reported Skinner and his partner are expecting a fourth child.

== Filmography ==
Year	Title	Role	Notes
2019	The Apprentice	Contestant	
2020	8 Out of 10 Cats	Panellist	
2020	Celebrity MasterChef	Contestant	
2022, 2023, 2025	The Apprentice: You're Fired!	Panellist	
2023	Good Morning Sports Fans	Panellist	
2023	Michael McIntyre's The Wheel	Celebrity expert	
2025	Faking It	Mentor	
2025	Strictly Come Dancing	Himself	Contestant; series 23; 15th place
2025	The Celebrity Apprentice	Contestant	(Christmas Specials)
