= Amy Dowden =

Welsh dancer (born 1990)

Amy Dowden MBE
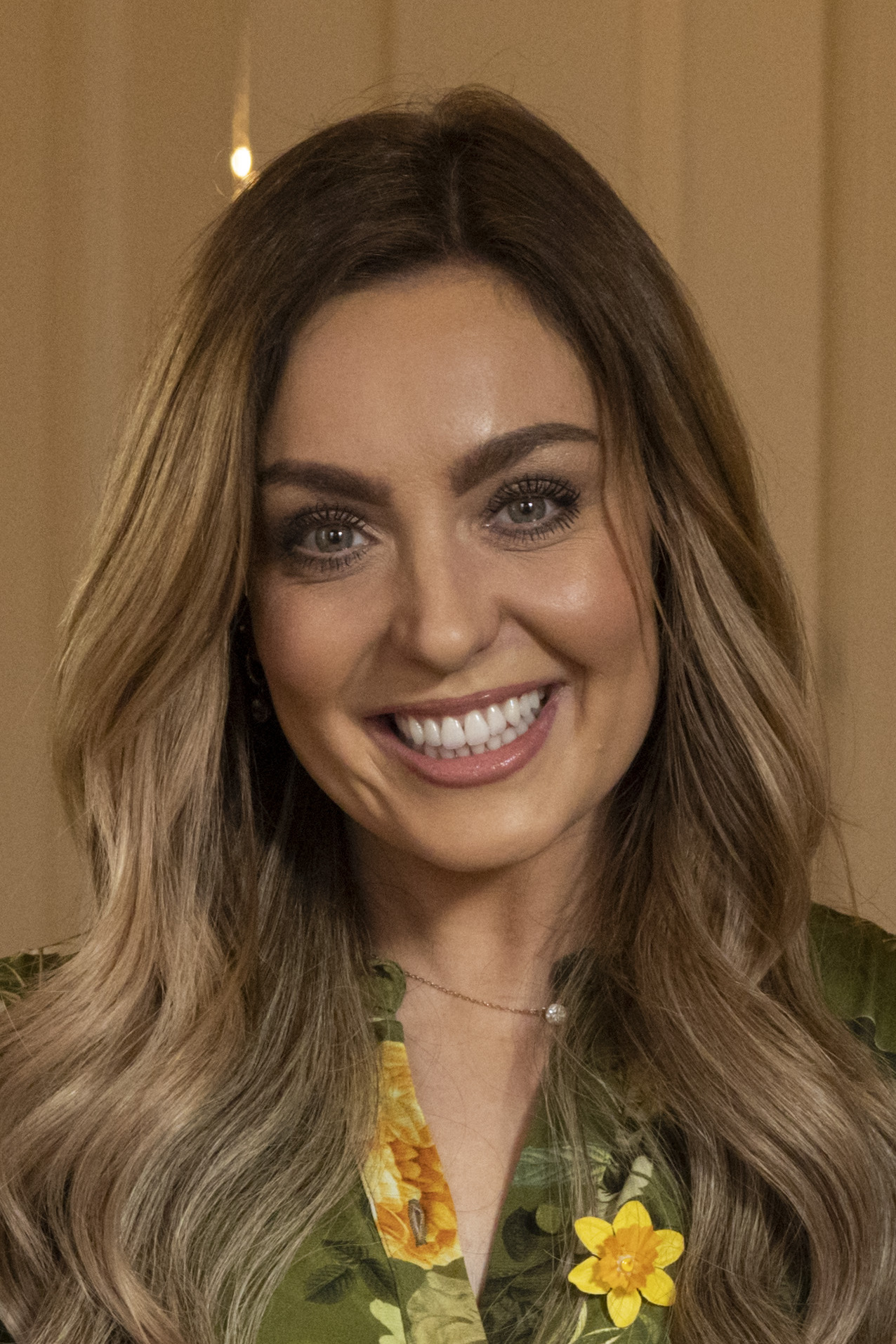
- Dowden in 2023
- Born: 10 August 1990 (age 36); Caerphilly, Wales, United Kingdom
- Occupation: Professional dancer
- Spouse: Benjamin Jones (m. 2022)

Amy Dowden (born 10 August 1990) is a British professional ballroom and Latin American dancer from Caerphilly, Wales, best known for her appearances on the BBC One television show Strictly Come Dancing. Dowden joined the series in 2017, and in 2019, she was a finalist in the seventeenth series with TV presenter Karim Zeroual. Dowden and her partner Ben Jones are former British National Latin Dance Champions.

== Early life ==
Amy Dowden was born on 10 August 1990 in Caerphilly and began dancing at the age of eight. She has a twin sister and an older brother. Alongside her partner Ben Jones, she became British Open Latin Dance Champion in 2017, and the couple were the first all-British pair to win the championships in over 30 years. Other successes include becoming British Dance Federation Champions, English Closed Champions and Welsh Closed and Open Champions. Dowden is also a four-time British National Finalist, and a World Championship semi-finalist, and she remains one of the highest-ranking Ballroom and Latin American professional dancers in the UK.

== Personal life ==
Dowden is married to Ben Jones, her professional dance partner, and together they run the Art in Motion dance school in Cradley Heath.

Dowden has suffered from Crohn's disease since she was a child. In May 2019, she spoke out about the effect the condition has had on her career as a professional dancer. In October 2020, the BBC aired a documentary about Dowden's experiences of living with the condition. The documentary won a BAFTA Cymru award.

In May 2023, Dowden announced she had been diagnosed with grade III breast cancer. She underwent a mastectomy. In July of that year, Dowden revealed that she had received a second diagnosis of "another type of cancer", leaving her requiring chemotherapy and unable to take part in Series 21 of Strictly Come Dancing later that year. In August 2023, Dowden announced that she had contracted sepsis after finishing her first round of chemotherapy. In November 2023, she revealed she had sustained a broken foot and therefore would play no further part in that year's series of Strictly. A month later, Dowden was hospitalised with a blood clot on her lung, which was described as a side-effect of her cancer. In February 2024, she reported that her latest check up showed "no sign of the disease", although she wouldn't get an "all clear" for five years. In August 2024, however, she revealed that tests had shown abnormalities in her breast following a routine check up. In November 2025, Dowden announced that she was due to undergo another mastectomy. She clarified that the procedure was not prompted by a new cancer diagnosis.

Dowden was appointed Member of the Order of the British Empire (MBE) in the 2024 Birthday Honours for services to fundraising and raising awareness of inflammatory bowel disease.

On 26 October 2024, Dowden was taken to hospital following a collapse after her routine during the live Strictly Come Dancing competition. It was confirmed that her partner in the show, JB Gill, would perform with Lauren Oakley in the following week's show. She withdrew from the series on 4 November 2024, citing a foot injury.

In June 2026, Dowden was the subject of the BBC Television genealogy programme Who Do You Think You Are. Dowden discovered that, in 1888, her three-times great aunt Elinor (Nellie) had died, after being accidentally shot, at the age of 14. The 17-year old perpetrator, who was a friend and fellow servant, was later tried for manslaughter, but was found not guilty.

== Strictly Come Dancing ==
Dowden is the first Welsh professional to take part in the BBC's Strictly Come Dancing series.

| Series | Partner | Place | Average Score |
|---|---|---|---|
| 15 | Brian Conley | 12th | 19.8 |
| 16 | Danny John-Jules | 9th | 28.3 |
| 17 | Karim Zeroual | 2nd | 35.7 |
| 18 | JJ Chalmers | 6th | 21.0 |
| 19 | Tom Fletcher | 7th | 30.5 |
| 20 | James Bye | 11th | 25.5 |
| 22 | JB Gill | (Note: Dowden was forced to withdraw from the 22nd series after week 6 due to sustaining a foot injury, with Lauren Oakley subsequently replacing her as Gill's partner.) | 30.3 |
| 23 | Thomas Skinner | 15th | 14.5 |
| 24 | Chris Appleton | 15th | 16.5 |

Notes

Highest and Lowest Scoring Per Dance

| Dance | Partner | Highest | Partner | Lowest |
|---|---|---|---|---|
| American Smooth | Karim Zeroual | 38 | Brian Conley | 22 |
| Argentine Tango | Karim Zeroual | 36 | | |
| Cha-cha-cha | Karim Zeroual | 31 | Chris Appleton | 17 |
| Charleston | Karim Zeroual | 39 | JJ Chalmers; James Bye | 27 |
| Couple's Choice | Karim Zeroual | 38 | Tom Fletcher | 31 |
| Foxtrot | Karim Zeroual; JJ Chalmers; JB Gill | 32 | James Bye | 26 |
| Jive | Karim Zeroual | 40 | Brian Conley | 21 |
| Paso Doble | Tom Fletcher | 38 | Thomas Skinner | 16 |
| Quickstep | Karim Zeroual | 40 | Danny John-Jules | 22 |
| Rumba | JB Gill | 30 | | |
| Salsa | Karim Zeroual | 36 | Thomas Skinner | 13 |
| Samba | Danny John-Jules | 27 | Karim Zeroual | 26 |
| Showdance | Karim Zeroual | 39 | | |
| Tango | Karim Zeroual | 38 | Brian Conley Chris Appleton | 16 |
| Viennese Waltz | JJ Chalmers | 33 | Danny John Jules | 27 |
| Waltz | JB Gill | 31 | JJ Chalmers | 25 |

=== Performances with Brian Conley ===
In 2017, Dowden appeared as a professional dancer in the fifteenth series, partnered with comedian Brian Conley. They made it to week 5 of the competition.

| Week # | Dance / Song | Judges' score | | | | | Result |
|---|---|---|---|---|---|---|---|
| Week # | Dance / Song | Revel Horwood | Bussell | Ballas | Tonioli | Total | Result |
| 1 | Tango / "Temptation" | 3 | 4 | 4 | 5 | 16 | No Elimination |
| 2 | Cha-cha-cha / "Shake Your Groove Thing" | 3 | 5 | 5 | 6 | 19 | Bottom Two |
| 3 | American Smooth / "If I Only Had a Brain" | 5 | 5 | 6 | 6 | 22 | Safe |
| 4 | Paso Doble / "I Believe in a Thing Called Love" | 4 | 6 | 6 | 5 | 21 | Safe |
| 5 | Jive / "It's Not Unusual" | 4 | 6 | 6 | 5 | 21 | Eliminated |

- Red number indicates Brian & Amy were at the bottom of the leaderboard

=== Performances with Danny John-Jules ===
Dowden returned for her second series in 2018 where she was partnered with Danny John-Jules. The couple were awarded the first 10 score of the series by Darcey Bussell for their Jive to "Flip, Flop and Fly" in week 5. They were eliminated in week 8 after losing a dance-off to Graeme Swann and Oti Mabuse; their elimination came days after controversial bullying allegations, with tabloids reporting that John-Jules had reduced Dowden to tears.

| Week # | Dance / Song | Judges' score | | | | | Result |
|---|---|---|---|---|---|---|---|
| Week # | Dance / Song | Revel Horwood | Bussell | Ballas | Tonioli | Total | Result |
| 1 | Foxtrot / "Top Cat (Theme Song)" | 6 | 7 | 7 | 7 | 27 | No Elimination |
| 2 | Cha-cha-cha / "Beggin'" | 7 | 7 | 7 | 7 | 28 | Safe |
| 3 | Paso Doble / "The Greatest Show" | 6 | 7 | 7 | 8 | 28 | Safe |
| 4 | Viennese waltz / "I've Gotta Be Me" | 6 | 7 | 7 | 7 | 27 | Safe |
| 5 | Jive / "Flip, Flop and Fly" | 9 | 10 | 9 | 9 | 37 | Safe |
| 6 | American Smooth / "Spirit in the Sky" | 6 | 8 | 7 | 9 | 30 | Safe |
| 7 | Quickstep / "Freedom" | 4 | 6 | 5 | 7 | 22 | Safe |
| 8 | Samba / "Feels Like Home" | 6 | 7 | 7 | 7 | 27 | Eliminated |

- Blue score awarded by guest judge Alfonso Riberio
- Green number indicates Danny & Amy were at the top of the leaderboard
- Red number indicates Danny & Amy were at the bottom of the leaderboard

=== Performances with Karim Zeroual ===
In 2019, Dowden appeared as a professional dancer in the seventeenth series of the show, partnered with CBBC presenter Karim Zeroual. The pair received the first perfect 40 of the series for their Jive in week 11.

| Week # | Dance/Song | Judges' score | | | | | Result |
|---|---|---|---|---|---|---|---|
| Week # | Dance/Song | Revel Horwood | Mabuse | Ballas | Tonioli | Total | Result |
| 1 | Cha-Cha-Cha / "If I Can't Have You" | 8 | 8 | 7 | 8 | 31 | No Elimination |
| 2 | Foxtrot / "The Way You Look Tonight" | 8 | 8 | 8 | 8 | 32 | Safe |
| 3 | Samba / "Kung Fu Fighting" | 6 | 7 | 6 | 7 | 26 | Safe |
| 4 | Tango / "Paradise" | 9 | 10 | 9 | 10 | 38 | Safe |
| 5 | Salsa / "Who Let the Dogs Out?" | 8 | 10 | 9 | 9 | 36 | Safe |
| 6 | Paso Doble / "Smalltown Boy" | 7 | 7 | 7 | 8 | 29 | Safe |
| 7 | Quickstep / "Mr. Pinstripe Suit" | 9 | 10 | 10 | 10 | 39 | Safe |
| 8 | Viennese Waltz / "Give Me Love" | 6 | 8 | 8 | 8 | 30 | Safe |
| 9 | Charleston / "Happy" | 9 | 10 | 10 | 10 | 39 | Safe |
| 10 | Contemporary / "Drops of Jupiter" | 9 | 9 | 10 | 10 | 38 | Bottom Two |
| 11 | Jive / "You Can't Stop the Beat" | 10 | 10 | 10 | 10 | 40 | Safe |
| 12 | Argentine Tango / "Libertango"; American Smooth / "Sweet Caroline" | 8; 9 | 10; 10 | 9; 9 | 9; 10 | 36; 38 | Bottom Two |
| 13 | Quickstep / "Mr. Pinstripe Suit"; Showdance / "A Million Dreams"; Jive / "You Can't Stop the Beat" | 10; 9; 10 | 10; 10; 10 | 10; 10; 10 | 10; 10; 10 | 40; 39; 40 | Runner-up |

- Blue score awarded by guest judge Alfonso Riberio
- Green number indicates Karim & Amy were at the top of the leaderboard

=== Performances with JJ Chalmers ===
In the eighteenth series, Dowden partnered with television presenter JJ Chalmers. They finished in 6th place, reaching musical week. The scores for this series were out of 30.

| Week No. | Dance/Song | Judges'Score | | | Total | Result |
| Week No. | Dance/Song | Revel Horwood | Ballas | Mabuse | Total | Result |
|---|---|---|---|---|---|---|
| 1 | Waltz / "What a Wonderful World" | 6 | 6 | 7 | 19 | No Elimination |
| 2 | Paso Doble / "Believer" | 5 | 6 | 6 | 17 | Safe |
| 3 | Foxtrot / "Raindrops Keep Fallin' On My Head"-from "Butch Cassidy and the Sundance Kid" | 8 | 8 | 8 | 24 | Safe |
| 4 | Jive / "Boogie Woogie Bugle Boy" | 4 | 6 | 7 | 17 | Safe |
| 5 | Quickstep / "For Once in My Life" | 7 | 9 | 9 | 25 | Safe |
| 6 | Viennese Waltz / "Rescue" | 8 | 9 | 8 | 25 | Safe |
| 7 | Charleston / "Chitty Chitty Bang Bang"- from "Chitty Chitty Bang Bang" | 6 | 7 | 7 | 20 | Eliminated |

- Blue score was awarded by Anton Du Beke who filled in for Motsi Mabuse as judge for weeks 4 and 5.

=== Performances with Tom Fletcher ===
In the nineteenth series, Dowden partnered with musician Tom Fletcher. On 26 September 2021, it was announced that both had contracted COVID-19 and would miss the following week's show. On 21 November 2021, in week 9 of the competition, they were the eighth couple to be eliminated, after a dance-off against Rhys Stephenson and Nancy Xu.

| Week # | Dance/Song | Judges' score | | | | | Result |
|---|---|---|---|---|---|---|---|
| Week # | Dance/Song | Revel Horwood | Mabuse | Ballas | Du Beke | Total | Result |
| 1 | Cha-Cha-Cha / "September" | 4 | 7 | 5 | 5 | 21 | No Elimination |
| 2 | No dance | - | - | - | - | - | Given bye |
| 3 | Jive / "Johnny B. Goode" | 8 | 8 | 8 | 8 | 32 | Safe |
| 4 | Foxtrot / "Fly Me to the Moon" | 7 | 8 | 7 | 7 | 29 | Safe |
| 5 | Salsa / "Watermelon Sugar" | 8 | 9 | 9 | 8 | 34 | Safe |
| 6 | Tango / "Highway to Hell" | 7 | 8 | 7 | 7 | 29 | Safe |
| 7 | Paso Doble / "Amparito Roca" | 9 | 10 | 10 | 9 | 38 | Safe |
| 8 | Viennese waltz / "Iris" | 7 | 8 | 7 | 8 | 30 | Safe |
| 9 | Couple's Choice / "On My Own" | 7 | 8 | 8 | 8 | 31 | Eliminated |

- Blue score was awarded by Cynthia Erivo who filled in for Craig Revel Horwood as judge for week 9.
- Red number indicates Tom & Amy were at the bottom of the leaderboard

=== Performances with James Bye ===
In the twentieth series, Dowden partnered EastEnders actor James Bye. They were eliminated in week 6 of the competition, finishing in 11th place.

| Week # | Dance/Song | Judges' score | | | | | Result |
|---|---|---|---|---|---|---|---|
| Week # | Dance/Song | Revel Horwood | Mabuse | Ballas | Du Beke | Total | Result |
| 1 | Jive / "What I Like About You" | 6 | 5 | 5 | 6 | 22 | No Elimination |
| 2 | Tango / "Bad Habits" | 5 | 6 | 6 | 7 | 24 | Safe |
| 3 | Cha-Cha-Cha / "Hooked on a Feeling" | 4 | 6 | 6 | 6 | 22 | Safe |
| 4 | Quickstep / "Don't Get Me Wrong" | 8 | 8 | 8 | 8 | 32 | Safe |
| 5 | Foxtrot / "Julia's Theme" | 6 | 7 | 6 | 7 | 26 | Safe |
| 6 | Charleston / "Bumble Bee" | 6 | 7 | 7 | 7 | 27 | Eliminated |

- Red number indicates James & Amy were at the bottom of the leaderboard

=== Performances with JB Gill ===
In the twenty-second series, Dowden partnered JLS singer JB Gill. In Halloween week, Dowden didn't appear in the results show due to her collapsing backstage following the main show, so JB appeared alone. She was transported to Barnet Hospital as a precautionary measure, but was later reported to be feeling better. The following day, it was confirmed that professional dancer Lauren Oakley would take Dowden's place during her absence from the show. However, after week 7, it was confirmed Dowden was withdrawing from the series due to a foot injury, and Gill would dance with Oakley for the remainder of the series.

| Week # | Dance/Song | Judges' score | | | | | Result |
|---|---|---|---|---|---|---|---|
| Week # | Dance/Song | Revel Horwood | Mabuse | Ballas | Du Beke | Total | Result |
| 1 | Waltz / "When I Need You" | 7 | 8 | 8 | 8 | 31 | No elimination |
| 2 | Cha-cha-cha / "Closer" | 7 | 7 | 6 | 7 | 27 | Safe |
| 3 | American Smooth / "Pure Imagination" | 7 | 8 | 8 | 9 | 32 | Safe |
| 4 | Rumba / "You Might Need Somebody" | 7 | 8 | 7 | 8 | 30 | Safe |
| 5 | Jive / "Hey Ya!" | 7 | 8 | 7 | 8 | 30 | Bottom two |
| 6 | Foxtrot / "Dancing in the Moonlight" | 7 | 9 | 8 | 8 | 32 | Safe |

- Green number indicates JB & Amy were at the top of the leaderboard

=== Performances with Thomas Skinner ===
In the twenty-third series, Dowden was partnered with businessman Thomas Skinner. They were eliminated in Week Two and finished in last place.

| Week # | Dance/Song | Judges' score | | | | | Result |
|---|---|---|---|---|---|---|---|
| Week # | Dance/Song | Revel Horwood | Mabuse | Ballas | Du Beke | Total | Result |
| 1 | Paso doble / "Battle Without Honor or Humanity" | 2 | 4 | 5 | 5 | 16 | No elimination |
| 2 | Salsa / "Bonkers" | 2 | 3 | 4 | 4 | 13 | Eliminated |

- Red number indicates Thomas & Amy were at the bottom of the leaderboard

=== Strictly Come Dancing: It Takes Two ===
In 2022, on an episode of Strictly Come Dancing: It Takes Two, Dowden set the Guinness World Record for Back Charleston Kick Steps performed in 30 seconds, with 19 completed in the allotted time.

=== Strictly Come Dancing Christmas Special ===
Dowden danced with CBeebies presenter George Webster for the 2022 Strictly Come Dancing Christmas Special.

== Dance tours and other professional engagements ==
In 2019, Dowden headlined her own tour, 'Here Come The Girls', with fellow professional dancers Dianne Buswell and Chloe Hewitt.

Dowden has also taken part in the Strictly Come Dancing Live! tour since 2018. In 2020, she performed with a celebrity partner for the first time on tour, her 2019 partner Karim Zeroual.

In October 2025, Dowden announced her appearance at the 2026 'Dancing With The Stars Weekend' at the Celtic Manor Resort in Newport.
