= On My Own (Les Misérables song) =

Musical number for Éponine

"On My Own" is a solo from the 1980 musical Les Misérables for the part of Éponine. Beginning in the key of D major, modulating to Bb major, then ending in F major, this is the most important song for the role of Éponine. In the song, she expresses her unrequited love for her best friend, Marius, and how she dreams of being at his side but knows his love is for Cosette and not for her.

The solo did not exist in the original French show that opened in 1980. When the English version was written, the music for "On My Own" was adapted from the original French solo "L'Air de la Misère" which was sung by Fantine about her misery and suffering. In turn, Éponine's original French solo, "L'un Vers L'autre", was dropped in the English version. In the later 1991 Parisian version, the title was "Mon Histoire" (My story). However, "On My Own" has become one of the most famous songs in the musical, and Éponine one of its most popular characters.

The first actress to play Éponine (English version) on stage was Frances Ruffelle; her version of "On My Own" is preserved on both the Original London and Broadway cast albums.

It has appeared in many famous events outside of Les Misérables.

Michelle Kwan skated to "On My Own" during the 1997 Skate America competition as well as the 1998 Tokyo Golden Gala and the 1998 Nagano Winter Olympics. Tom Fletcher danced with Amy Dowden in Strictly Come Dancing (series 19) to "On My Own" sung by Shan Ako.

The character of Joey Potter in Dawson's Creek, played by Katie Holmes, sang this song at a talent show phase of a beauty show, (Season 1, Episode 12) in which she participated. In the pilot episode of Glee, the character of Rachel Berry, played by Lea Michele, sang this song as her audition piece for the New Directions glee club, this version charted at number 42 in Ireland and 73 in the UK. Singer Joey Sontz recorded "On My Own" for his debut album "Chasing The Dream" in 2012.

For her audition for Miss Saigon, the then 17-year-old Lea Salonga chose to sing the song and was later asked to sing "Sun and Moon" from Miss Saigon, impressing the audition panel. Salonga has sometimes credited "On My Own" as the starting point of her international career.

Actor and singer Michael Crawford recorded a version of "On My Own" for his album With Love / The Phantom Unmasked (1989).
