= Strictly Come Dancing series 17 =

2019 series of the show

Strictly Come Dancing
- Series 17
- Presented by: Tess Daly; Claudia Winkleman
- Judges: Shirley Ballas; Motsi Mabuse; Craig Revel Horwood; Bruno Tonioli; Alfonso Ribeiro (guest)
- Celebrity winner: Kelvin Fletcher
- Professional winner: Oti Mabuse
- No. of episodes: 25

Release
- Original network: BBC One
- Original release: 7 September – 14 December 2019

Series chronology
- ← Previous; Series 16 Next → Series 18

Strictly Come Dancing returned for its seventeenth series with a launch show on 7 September 2019 on BBC One, and the live shows beginning on 21 September. Tess Daly and Claudia Winkleman returned as hosts, while Zoe Ball returned to host Strictly Come Dancing: It Takes Two alongside new addition Rylan Clark.

Shirley Ballas, Craig Revel Horwood, and Bruno Tonioli returned to the judging panel. After seven years, Darcey Bussell did not return to the series. Motsi Mabuse, elder sister of professional dancer Oti Mabuse, was announced as Bussell's replacement on 22 July. On 19 October, actor Alfonso Ribeiro returned as a guest judge.

Emmerdale actor Kelvin Fletcher and Oti Mabuse were announced as the winners on 14 December, while EastEnders actress Emma Barton and Anton Du Beke, and CBBC presenter Karim Zeroual and Amy Dowden were the runners-up.

== Format ==
Hosts and Judges for Strictly Come Dancing Series 17

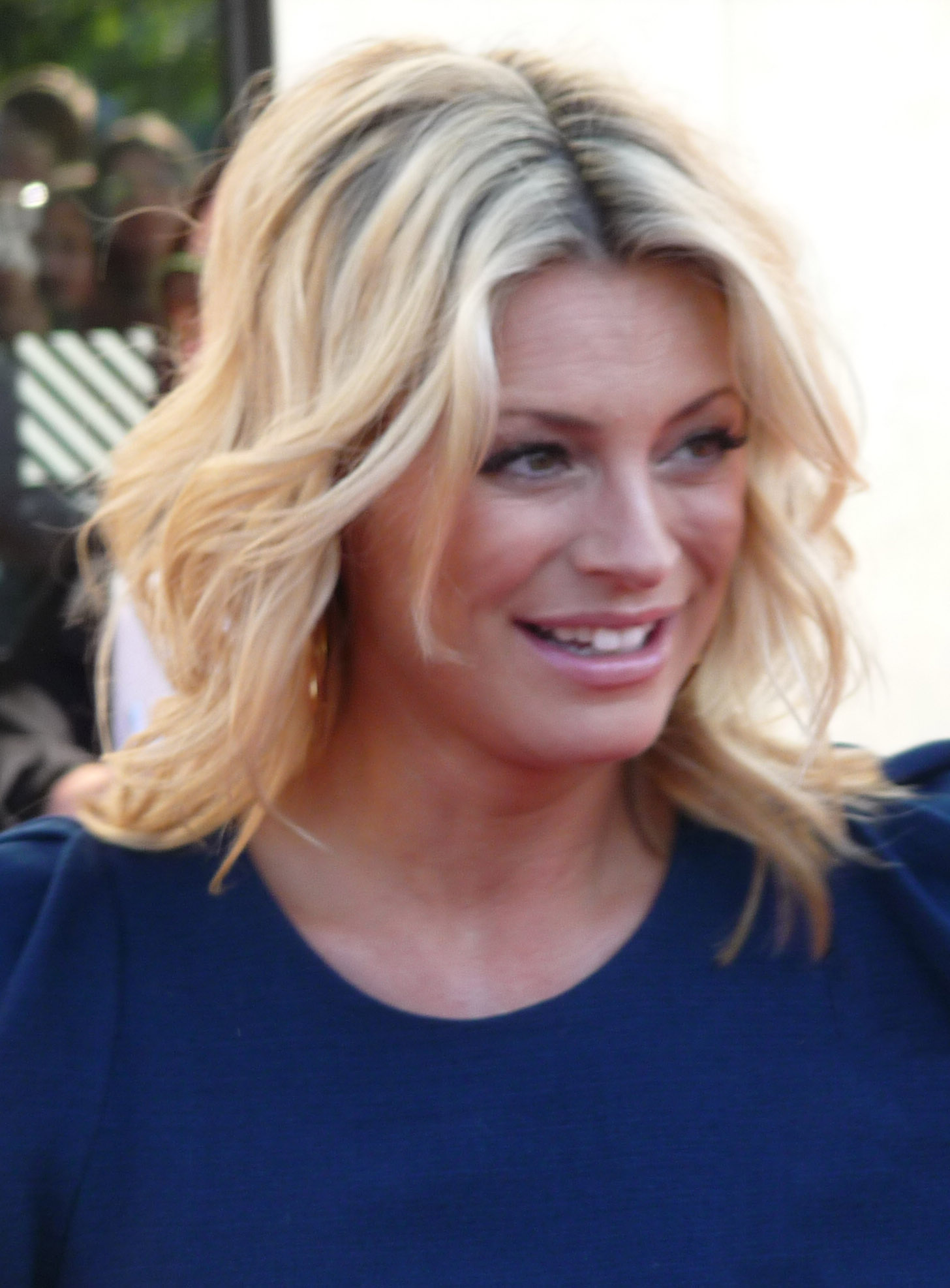
Tess Daly

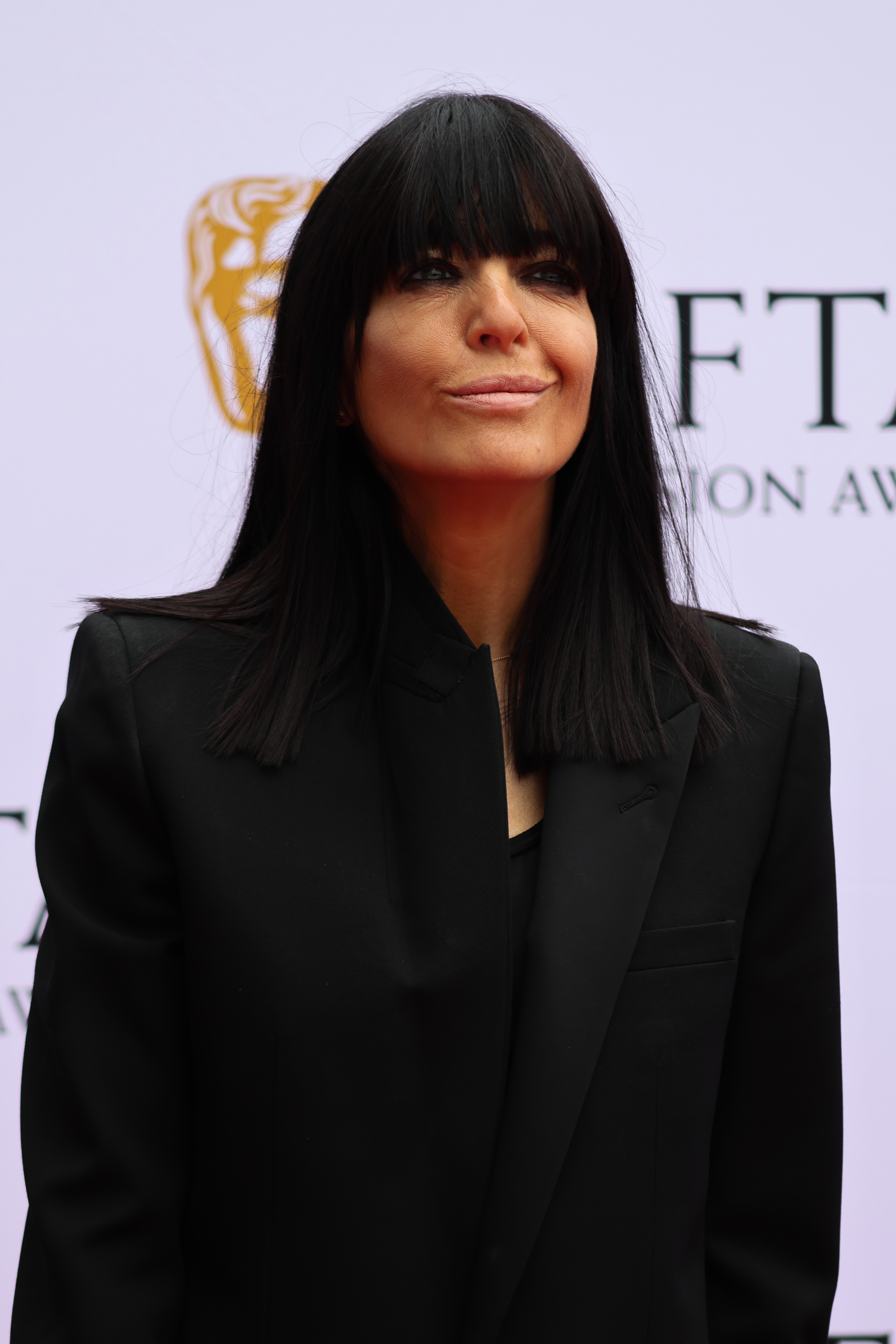
Claudia Winkleman

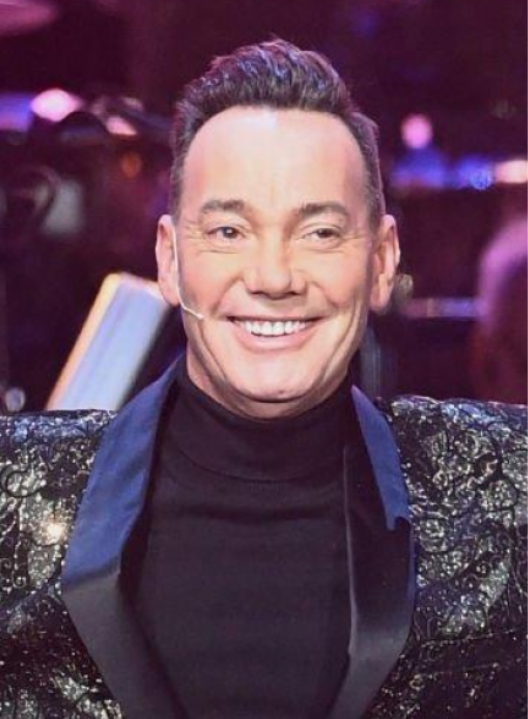
Craig Revel Horwood

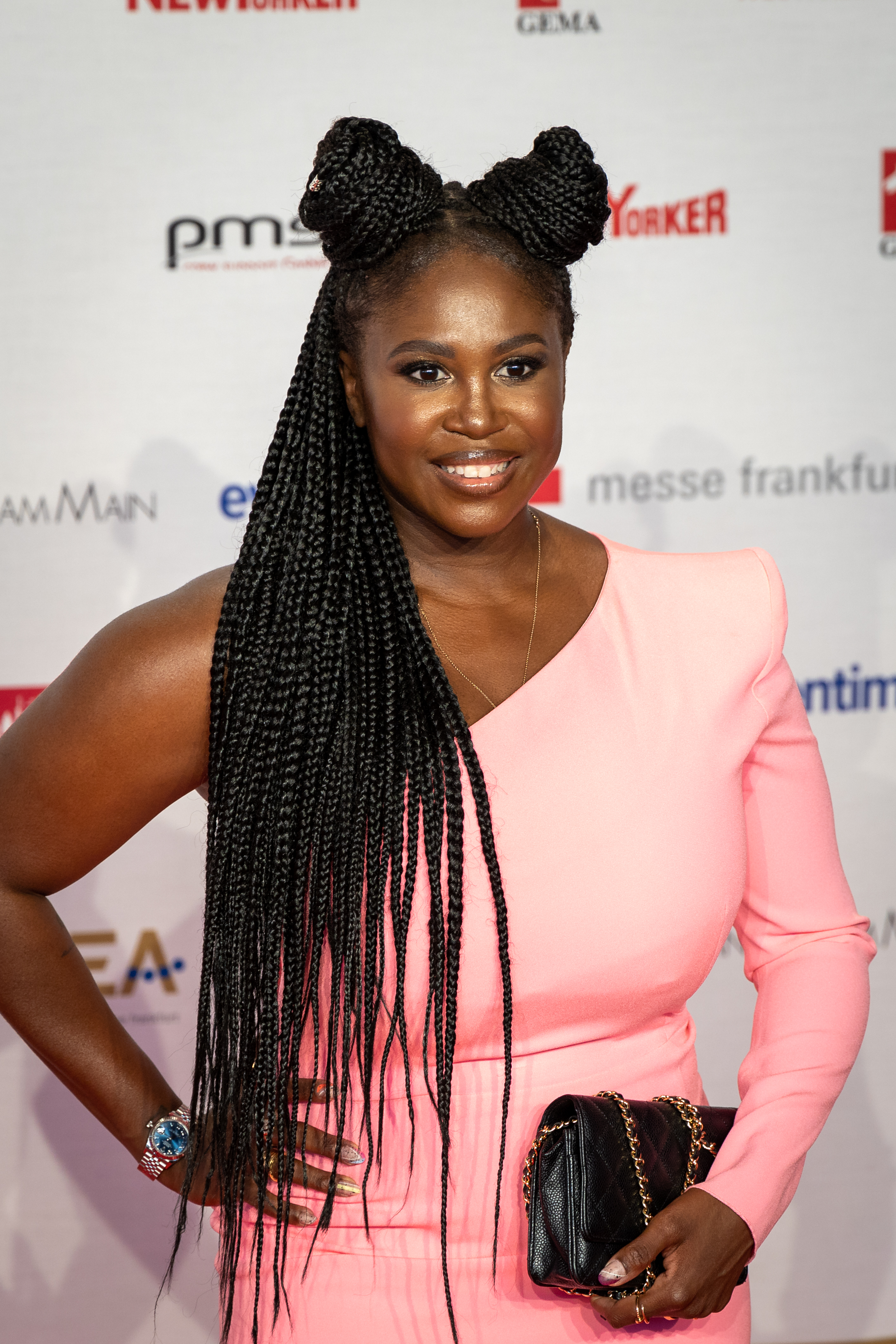
Motsi Mabuse

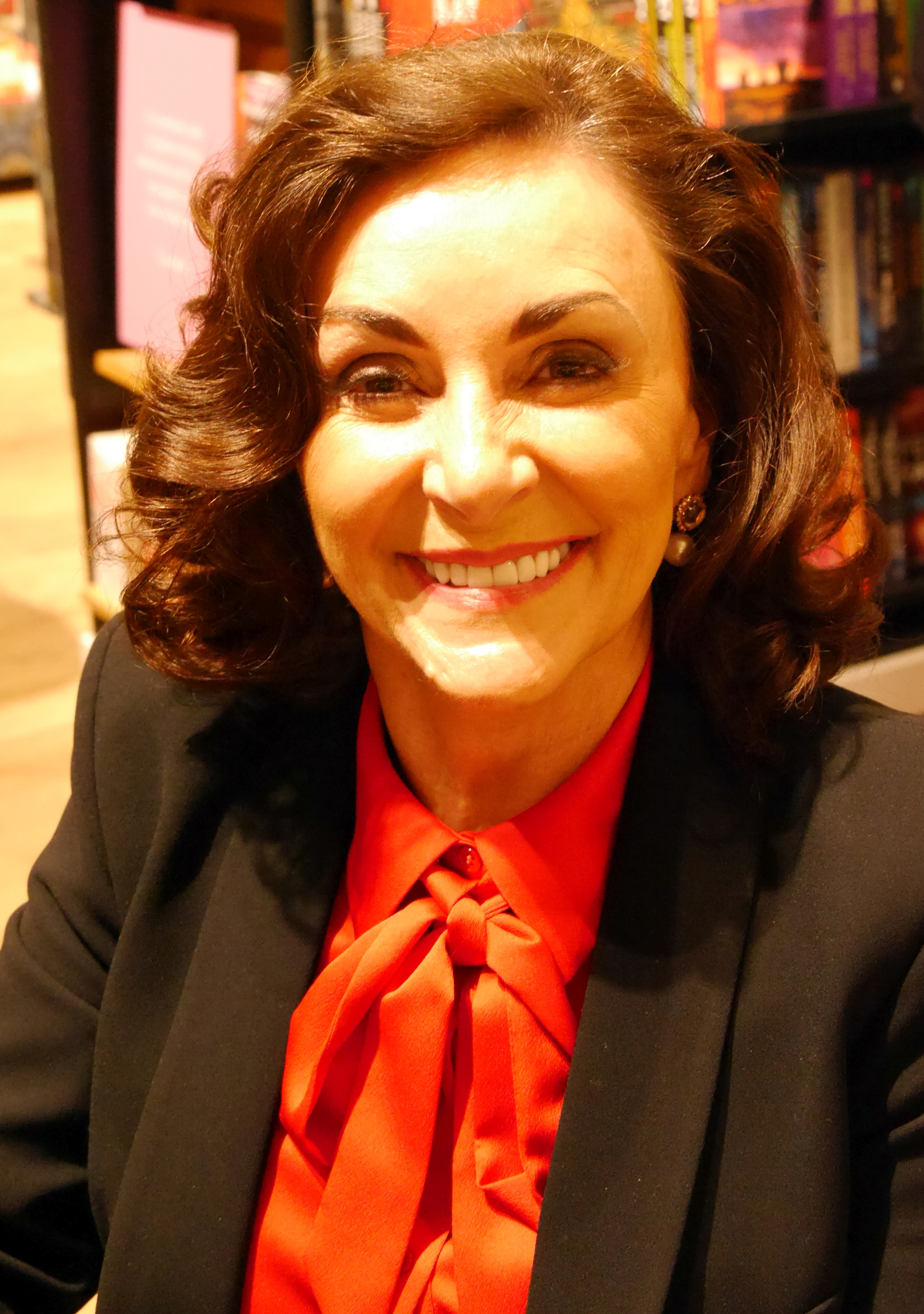
Shirley Ballas

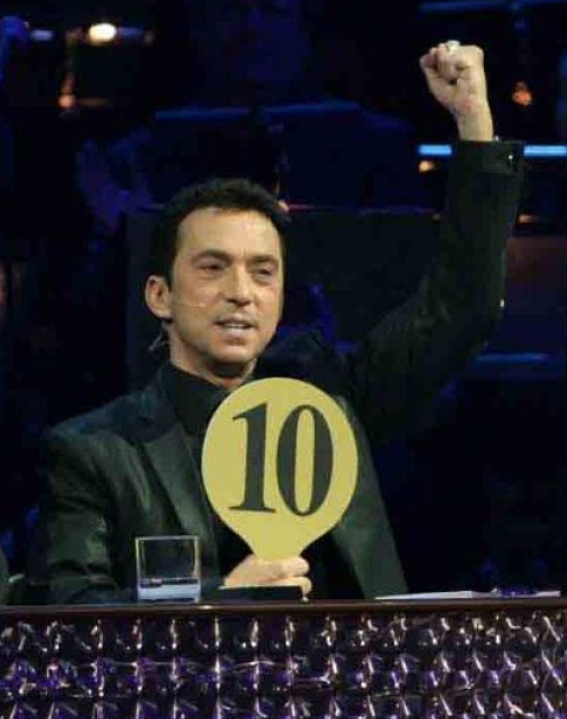
Bruno Tonioli

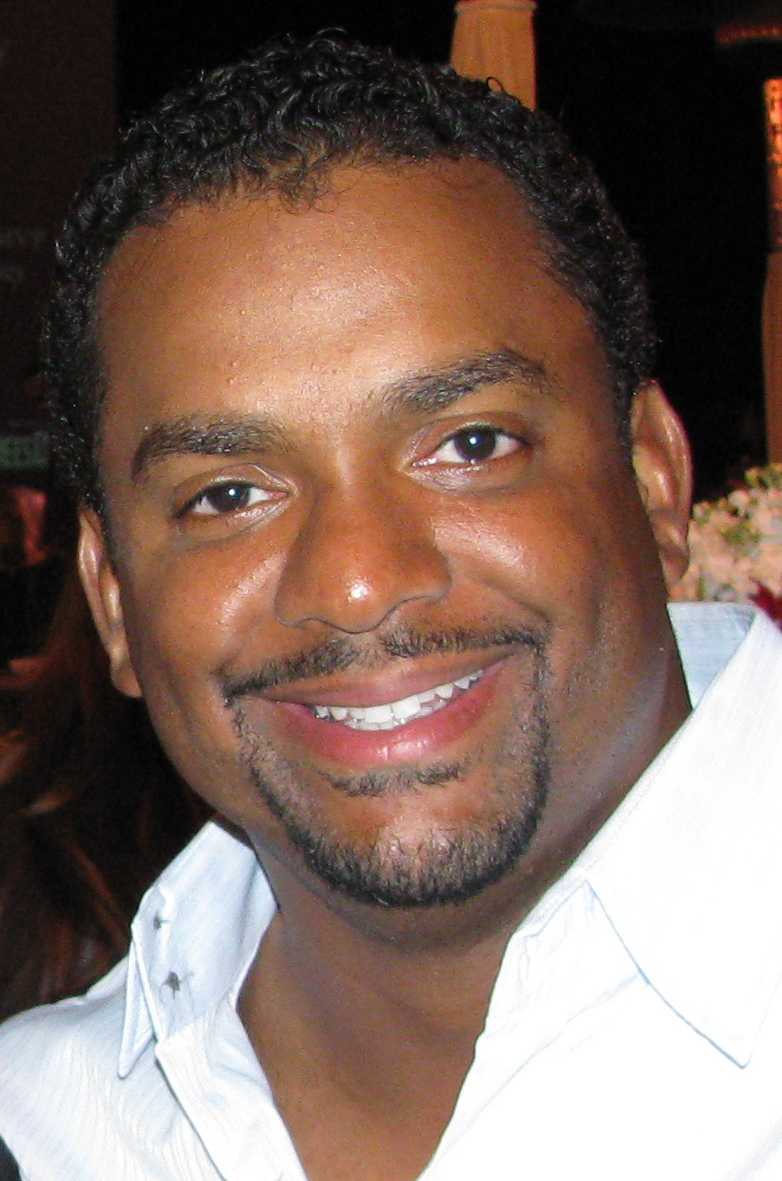
Alfonso Ribeiro (Guest)

The couples dance each week in a live show. The judges score each performance out of ten. The couples are then ranked according to the judges' scores and given points according to their rank, with the lowest scored couple receiving one point, and the highest scored couple receiving the most points (the maximum number of points available depends on the number of couples remaining in the competition). The public are also invited to vote for their favourite couples, and the couples are ranked again according to the number of votes they receive, again receiving points; the couple with the fewest votes receiving one point, and the couple with the most votes receiving the most points.

The points for judges' score and public vote are then added together, and the two couples with the fewest points are placed in the bottom two. If two couples have equal points, the points from the public vote are given precedence. As with the previous series, the bottom two couples have to perform a dance-off on the results show. Based on that performance alone, each judge then votes on which couple should stay and which couple should leave, with Shirley Ballas, as head judge, having the last and deciding vote.

== Professional dancers ==
On 1 March 2019, it was announced that Pasha Kovalev would be leaving the show after eight years as a professional dancer. On 30 July 2019, Nancy Xu was revealed to have been added to the cast of professionals. On 21 August 2019, it was confirmed that both Gorka Márquez and Graziano Di Prima would not have celebrity partners, a change from the previous series; in their place, the three professionals who did not have celebrity partners in series 16 - Neil Jones, Johannes Radebe, and Luba Mushtuk - were all given one for the first time.

== Couples ==
This series featured fifteen celebrity contestants. On 31 July 2019, the first three celebrities were announced: Emma Barton, David James, and Chris Ramsey. Celebrity reveals continued throughout the next week until the full line-up was revealed on 7 August 2019. Made in Chelsea star Jamie Laing was originally announced as a contestant, but on 5 September 2019, it was announced that he had withdrawn from the show due to a foot injury. He was replaced by former Emmerdale actor Kelvin Fletcher on 7 September 2019.

Due to a knee injury sustained when he landed after jumping from a raised platform during studio rehearsals, Will Bayley was unable to perform on 26 October in the live episode. The injury was such that, on 30 October, he withdrew from the competition.

Celebrity	Notability	Professional partner	Status
James Cracknell	Olympic rower	Luba Mushtuk	Eliminated 1st on 29 September 2019
Anneka Rice	Television & radio presenter	Kevin Clifton	Eliminated 2nd on 6 October 2019
Dev Griffin	BBC Radio 1 presenter	Dianne Buswell	Eliminated 3rd on 13 October 2019
David James	England goalkeeper	Nadiya Bychkova	Eliminated 4th on 20 October 2019
Catherine Tyldesley	Coronation Street actress	Johannes Radebe	Eliminated 5th on 27 October 2019
Will Bayley	Paralympic table tennis player	Janette Manrara	Withdrew on 30 October 2019
Emma Weymouth	Fashion model & socialite	Aljaž Škorjanec	Eliminated 6th on 3 November 2019
Mike Bushell	BBC Breakfast sports presenter	Katya Jones	Eliminated 7th on 10 November 2019
Michelle Visage	RuPaul's Drag Race judge & singer	Giovanni Pernice	Eliminated 8th on 17 November 2019
Saffron Barker	YouTube personality	AJ Pritchard	Eliminated 9th on 24 November 2019
Alex Scott	England footballer	Neil Jones; Kevin Clifton (Weeks 6–7)	Eliminated 10th on 1 December 2019
Chris Ramsey	Stand-up comedian	Karen Hauer	Eliminated 11th on 8 December 2019
Emma Barton	EastEnders actress	Anton Du Beke	Runners-up on 14 December 2019
Karim Zeroual	CBBC presenter & actor	Amy Dowden	Runners-up on 14 December 2019
Kelvin Fletcher	Emmerdale actor & racing driver	Oti Mabuse	Winners on 14 December 2019

== Scoring chart ==
The highest score each week is indicated in bold green with a dagger (†), while the lowest score each week is indicated in italicized red with a double-dagger (‡).

Color key:

Winners
Runners-up
Bottom two
Excused from competition for the week
Withdrew from competition
Eliminated

Strictly Come Dancing (series 17) - Weekly scores
Couple	Pl.	Week													
Couple	Pl.	1	2	1+2	3	4	5	6	7	8	9	10	11	12	13
Kelvin & Oti	1st	**32**†	28	60	**38**†	36	33	36	34	35	**39**†	**38**†	39	40+37=**77**†	39+40+39=118 (Note: This couple finished in first place.)
Emma B. & Anton	2nd	23	24	47	27	35	26	28	22‡	33	37	29	39	31+36=67	39+38+39=116‡ (Note: This couple finished in second place.)
Karim & Amy	2nd	31	**32**†	**63**†	26	**38**†	36	29	**39**†	30	**39**†	**38**† (Note: This couple was in the bottom two, but was not eliminated.)	**40**†	36+38=74	40+39+40=**119**†
Chris & Karen	4th	13	26	39	22	26	25	23‡	34	26	33	31	28	26+28=54‡ (Note: This couple was eliminated.)	
Alex & Neil	5th	21	22	43	23	23‡	33	34	31	31	34	26‡	27‡		
Saffron & AJ	6th	27	23	50	28	33	**38**†	33	27	**39**†	35	26‡			
Michelle & Giovanni	7th	30	**32**†	62	35	31	29	**39**†	34	36	32‡				
Mike & Katya	8th	22	14	36	18	32	21	26	30	25‡					
Emma W. & Aljaž	9th	19	22	41	28	28	36	30	26						
Will & Janette	10th	26	24	50	23	24	32	(Note: This couple was excused from competition due to illness or injury, and was granted a bye to the following week.)	(Note: This couple withdrew from the competition.)						
Catherine & Johannes	11th	20	19	39	32	30	28	24							
David & Nadiya	12th	17	10‡	27	16	28	16‡								
Dev & Dianne	13th	30	27	57	36	27									
Anneka & Kevin	14th	14	19	33	11‡										
James & Luba	15th	11‡	13	24‡											

=== Average chart ===
This table only counts for dances scored on a traditional 40-point scale.

Couple	Rank by average	Total points	Number of dances	Total average
Kelvin & Oti	1st	583	16	36.4
Karim & Amy	2nd	571	16	35.7
Michelle & Giovanni	3rd	298	9	33.1
Emma B. & Anton	4th	506	16	31.6
Saffron & AJ	5th	309	10	30.9
Dev & Dianne	6th	120	4	30.0
Alex & Neil	7th	305	11	27.7
Emma W. & Aljaž	8th	189	7	27.0
Chris & Karen	9th	341	13	26.2
Will & Janette	10th	129	5	25.8
Catherine & Johannes	11th	153	6	25.5
Mike & Katya	12th	188	8	23.5
David & Nadiya	13th	87	5	17.4
Anneka & Kevin	14th	44	3	14.7
James & Luba	15th	24	2	12.0

== Weekly scores ==
Unless indicated otherwise, individual judges' scores in the charts below (given in parentheses) are listed in this order from left to right: Craig Revel Horwood, Motsi Mabuse, Shirley Ballas, Bruno Tonioli.

=== Week 1 ===
There was no elimination this week; all scores and votes carried over to the following week. Couples are listed in the order they performed.

Couple	Scores	Dance	Music
Alex & Neil	21 (5, 5, 5, 6)	Quickstep	"I Get a Kick Out of You" — Frank Sinatra
Chris & Karen	13 (3, 4, 3, 3)	Cha-cha-cha	"Juice" — Lizzo
Catherine & Johannes	20 (5, 5, 5, 5)	Viennese waltz	"I Got You Babe" — Sonny & Cher
Saffron & AJ	27 (6, 7, 7, 7)	Tango	"Lips Are Movin" — Meghan Trainor
Mike & Katya	22 (4, 6, 6, 6)	Jive	"Do You Love Me" — The Contours
Emma W. & Aljaž	19 (5, 5, 4, 5)	Cha-cha-cha	"She's a Lady" — Tom Jones
James & Luba	11 (2, 3, 3, 3)	Tango	"Gold" — Spandau Ballet
Kelvin & Oti	32 (8, 8, 8, 8)	Samba	"La Vida Es Un Carnaval" — Celia Cruz
David & Nadiya	17 (3, 4, 5, 5)	Foxtrot	"Three Lions" — Baddiel, Skinner & The Lightning Seeds
Michelle & Giovanni	30 (8, 8, 7, 7)	Cha-cha-cha	"So Emotional" — Whitney Houston
Dev & Dianne	30 (7, 7, 8, 8)	Foxtrot	"Build Me Up Buttercup" — The Foundations
Anneka & Kevin	14 (3, 4, 3, 4)	Cha-cha-cha	"Gloria" — Laura Branigan
Will & Janette	26 (5, 7, 7, 7)	Quickstep	"Pencil Full of Lead" — Paolo Nutini
Karim & Amy	31 (8, 8, 7, 8)	Cha-cha-cha	"If I Can't Have You" — Shawn Mendes
Emma B. & Anton	23 (6, 6, 5, 6)	Jive	"Honey, Honey" — ABBA

=== Week 2 ===
Musical guest: Lewis Capaldi — "Someone You Loved"

Couples are listed in the order they performed.

Couple	Scores	Dance	Music	Result
Saffron & AJ	23 (5, 5, 6, 7)	Cha-cha-cha	"One Touch" — Jess Glynne & Jax Jones	Safe
Anneka & Kevin	19 (4, 5, 5, 5)	Waltz	"Run to You" — Whitney Houston	Safe
Dev & Dianne	27 (6, 7, 7, 7)	Jive	"Dance with Me Tonight" — Olly Murs	Safe
Emma W. & Aljaž	22 (4, 6, 6, 6)	Tango	"Sucker" — Jonas Brothers	Safe
Chris & Karen	26 (5, 7, 7, 7)	Charleston	"Out of Our Heads" — Take That	Safe
Emma B. & Anton	24 (6, 6, 6, 6)	Foxtrot	"Sunshine of Your Love" — Ella Fitzgerald & Tommy Flanagan	Safe
James & Luba	13 (3, 3, 3, 4)	Jive	"Tutti Frutti" — Little Richard	Eliminated
Catherine & Johannes	19 (4, 5, 5, 5)	Samba	"Let the Groove Get In" — Justin Timberlake	Safe
Michelle & Giovanni	32 (8, 8, 8, 8)	Viennese waltz	"That's Amore" — Dean Martin	Safe
David & Nadiya	10 (2, 3, 2, 3)	Paso doble	"España cañí" — Pascual Marquina Narro	Bottom two
Karim & Amy	32 (8, 8, 8, 8)	Foxtrot	"The Way You Look Tonight" — Frank Sinatra	Safe
Mike & Katya	14 (3, 4, 3, 4)	American Smooth	"Rhinestone Cowboy" — Glen Campbell	Safe
Alex & Neil	22 (4, 6, 6, 6)	Cha-cha-cha	"What I Did for Love" — David Guetta, feat. Emeli Sandé	Safe
Kelvin & Oti	28 (7, 7, 7, 7)	Waltz	"What the World Needs Now Is Love" — Burt Bacharach	Safe
Will & Janette	24 (6, 6, 6, 6)	Salsa	"1-2-3" — Gloria Estefan & Miami Sound Machine	Safe

Judges' votes to save

- Revel Horwood: David & Nadiya
- Mabuse: David & Nadiya
- Tonioli: David & Nadiya
- Ballas: Did not vote, but would have voted to save David & Nadiya

=== Week 3: Movie Week ===
Musical guest: Harry Connick Jr. — "Anything Goes"

Couples are listed in the order they performed.

Couple	Scores	Dance	Music	Film	Result
Michelle & Giovanni	35 (8, 9, 9, 9)	Quickstep	"Cabaret"	Cabaret	Safe
Alex & Neil	23 (5, 6, 6, 6)	Rumba	"How Far I'll Go"	Moana	Safe
Chris & Karen	22 (4, 6, 6, 6)	American Smooth	"Cheek to Cheek"	Top Hat	Safe
Karim & Amy	26 (6, 7, 6, 7)	Samba	"Kung Fu Fighting"	Kung Fu Panda	Safe
Catherine & Johannes	32 (8, 8, 8, 8)	Rumba	"Shallow"	A Star Is Born	Safe
Will & Janette	23 (6, 6, 5, 6)	Paso doble	"Gotta Catch 'Em All"	Pokémon: The First Movie	Safe
Kelvin & Oti	38 (9, 9, 10, 10)	Charleston	"Trip a Little Light Fantastic"	Mary Poppins Returns	Safe
Emma W. & Aljaž	28 (7, 7, 7, 7)	Foxtrot	"Did I Make the Most of Loving You?"	Downton Abbey	Safe
Anneka & Kevin	11 (2, 3, 3, 3)	Charleston	"Woo-Hoo"	Kill Bill: Volume 1	Eliminated
Saffron & AJ	28 (7, 7, 7, 7)	Paso doble	"Everybody Wants to Rule the World"	The Hunger Games: Catching Fire	Safe
Mike & Katya	18 (3, 5, 5, 5)	Cha-cha-cha	"It's Raining Men"	Magic Mike	Safe
David & Nadiya	16 (4, 4, 4, 4)	American Smooth	"Kiss from a Rose"	Batman Forever	Bottom two
Emma B. & Anton	27 (6, 7, 7, 7)	Salsa	"Soul Bossa Nova"	Austin Powers: International Man of Mystery	Safe
Dev & Dianne	36 (9, 9, 9, 9)	Street/Commercial	"Friend Like Me"	Aladdin	Safe

Judges' votes to save

- Revel Horwood: David & Nadiya
- Mabuse: David & Nadiya
- Tonioli: David & Nadiya
- Ballas: Did not vote, but would have voted to save David & Nadiya

=== Week 4 ===
Musical guest: Keith Urban — "Never Comin Down"

Couples are listed in the order they performed.

Couple	Scores	Dance	Music	Result
Chris & Karen	26 (6, 7, 7, 6)	Jive	"Saturday Night's Alright for Fighting" — Elton John	Safe
Emma B. & Anton	35 (8, 9, 9, 9)	Viennese waltz	"Send In the Clowns" — Barbra Streisand	Safe
Dev & Dianne	27 (6, 7, 7, 7)	Cha-cha-cha	"Dancing with a Stranger" — Sam Smith & Normani	Eliminated
Catherine & Johannes	30 (6, 8, 8, 8)	Charleston	"Single Ladies (Put a Ring on It)" — Beyoncé	Safe
Alex & Neil	23 (4, 6, 6, 7)	Tango	"Go Your Own Way" — Fleetwood Mac	Safe
David & Nadiya	28 (6, 7, 7, 8)	Quickstep	"From Now On" — from The Greatest Showman	Safe
Kelvin & Oti	36 (9, 9, 9, 9)	Rumba	"Ain't No Sunshine" — Bill Withers	Safe
Emma W. & Aljaž	28 (7, 7, 7, 7)	Jive	"Kids in America" — Kim Wilde	Bottom two
Michelle & Giovanni	31 (7, 8, 8, 8)	Salsa	"Quimbara"—Celia Cruz & Johnny Pacheco	Safe
Will & Janette	24 (6, 6, 6, 6)	Foxtrot	"Señorita" — Shawn Mendes & Camila Cabello	Safe
Mike & Katya	32 (7, 9, 8, 8)	Quickstep	"Come On Eileen" — Dexys Midnight Runners	Safe
Saffron & AJ	33 (7, 8, 9, 9)	Contemporary	"Because You Loved Me" — Celine Dion	Safe
Karim & Amy	38 (9, 10, 9, 10)	Tango	"Paradise" — George Ezra	Safe

Judges' votes to save

- Revel Horwood: Emma W. & Aljaž
- Mabuse: Emma W. & Aljaž
- Tonioli: Emma W. & Aljaž
- Ballas: Did not vote, but would have voted to save Emma W. & Aljaž

=== Week 5 ===
Individual judges' scores in the chart below (given in parentheses) are listed in this order from left to right: Craig Revel Horwood, Motsi Mabuse, Shirley Ballas, Alfonso Ribeiro.

Musical guest: Mabel — "Don't Call Me Up"

Actor Alfonso Ribeiro filled in as a guest judge while Bruno Tonioli was unavailable while filming for Dancing with the Stars.

Couples are listed in the order they performed.

Couple	Scores	Dance	Music	Result
Kelvin & Oti	33 (8, 8, 8, 9)	Cha-cha-cha	"Get Stupid" — Aston Merrygold	Safe
David & Nadiya	16 (3, 4, 4, 5)	Jive	"Such a Night" — Michael Bublé	Eliminated
Catherine & Johannes	28 (6, 7, 7, 8)	Tango	"Little Bird" — Annie Lennox	Safe
Karim & Amy	36 (8, 10, 9, 9)	Salsa	"Who Let the Dogs Out?" — Baha Men	Safe
Michelle & Giovanni	29 (7, 7, 7, 8)	Rumba	"Too Good at Goodbyes" — Sam Smith	Safe
Emma B. & Anton	26 (5, 7, 7, 7)	Paso doble	"Nothing Breaks Like a Heart" — Mark Ronson, feat. Miley Cyrus	Safe
Alex & Neil	33 (8, 8, 8, 9)	Charleston	"Pump Up the Jam" — Technotronic	Safe
Emma W. & Aljaž	36 (9, 9, 9, 9)	Viennese waltz	"Saving All My Love for You" — Whitney Houston	Safe
Mike & Katya	21 (3, 6, 5, 7)	Samba	"Apache" — The Sugarhill Gang	Bottom two
Will & Janette	32 (7, 8, 8, 9)	Contemporary	"7 Years" — Lukas Graham	Safe
Chris & Karen	25 (5, 6, 7, 7)	Quickstep	"Let's Go Crazy" — Prince & The Revolution	Safe
Saffron & AJ	38 (9, 10, 9, 10)	Foxtrot	"Theme from New York, New York" — Frank Sinatra	Safe

Judges' votes to save

- Revel Horwood: Mike & Katya
- Mabuse: Mike & Katya
- Ribeiro: Mike & Katya
- Ballas: Did not vote, but would have voted to save Mike & Katya

=== Week 6: Halloween Week ===
Musical guest: Adam Lambert — "Superpower"

After Will Bayley sustained a knee injury, he was unable to perform on the live show. Under the rules of the show, he was granted a bye to the following week. Additionally, after Neil Jones sustained a calf injury in rehearsal, he was unable to perform on the live show. Alex Scott performed with Kevin Clifton instead.

Couples are listed in the order they performed.

Couple	Scores	Dance	Music	Result
Emma B. & Anton	28 (5, 7, 8, 8)	Tango	"Toccata and Fugue in D minor" — Johann Sebastian Bach	Safe
Emma W. & Aljaž	30 (6, 8, 8, 8)	Charleston	"A Little Party Never Killed Nobody (All We Got)" — Fergie, Q-Tip & GoonRock	Safe
Chris & Karen	23 (5, 6, 6, 6)	Samba	"Everybody (Backstreet's Back)" — Backstreet Boys	Safe
Saffron & AJ	33 (8, 8, 8, 9)	Jive	"Every Little Thing She Does Is Magic" — The Police	Safe
Mike & Katya	26 (6, 6, 7, 7)	Tango	"What You Waiting For?" — Gwen Stefani	Bottom two
Karim & Amy	29 (7, 7, 7, 8)	Paso doble	"Smalltown Boy" — Bronski Beat	Safe
Catherine & Johannes	24 (6, 6, 5, 7)	Cha-cha-cha	"Scared of the Dark" — Steps	Eliminated
Michelle & Giovanni	39 (9, 10, 10, 10)	Foxtrot	"The Addams Family Theme" — Vic Mizzy	Safe
Kelvin & Oti	36 (9, 9, 9, 9)	Tango	"Bad Guy" — Billie Eilish	Safe
Alex & Kevin	34 (7, 9, 9, 9)	Street/Commercial	"Ghostbusters" — Ray Parker Jr.	Safe

Judges' votes to save

- Revel Horwood: Mike & Katya
- Mabuse: Catherine & Johannes
- Tonioli: Catherine & Johannes
- Ballas: Mike & Katya (Since the other judges were not unanimous, Shirley Ballas, as head judge, made the final decision to save Mike & Katya.)

=== Week 7 ===
Musical guest: Emeli Sandé — "Shine"

After having missed the previous week, Will and Janette withdrew from the competition. Alex Scott performed again with Kevin Clifton.

Couples are listed in the order they performed.

Couple	Scores	Dance	Music	Result
Karim & Amy	39 (9, 10, 10, 10)	Quickstep	"Mr. Pinstripe Suit" — Big Bad Voodoo Daddy	Safe
Michelle & Giovanni	34 (8, 9, 9, 8)	Paso doble	"Another One Bites the Dust" — Queen	Safe
Emma W. & Aljaž	26 (5, 7, 7, 7)	Samba	"I Don't Care" — Ed Sheeran & Justin Bieber	Eliminated
Kelvin & Oti	34 (8, 9, 8, 9)	Viennese waltz	"Say Something" — A Great Big World & Christina Aguilera	Safe
Saffron & AJ	27 (6, 7, 7, 7)	Salsa	"Instruction" — Jax Jones, feat. Demi Lovato	Safe
Alex & Kevin	31 (7, 8, 8, 8)	American Smooth	"Ain't No Mountain High Enough" — Marvin Gaye & Tammi Terrell	Safe
Chris & Karen	34 (8, 9, 9, 8)	Street/Commercial	"Let's Get Ready to Rhumble" — PJ & Duncan	Safe
Emma B. & Anton	22 (5, 6, 5, 6)	Rumba	"Woman in Love" — Barbra Streisand	Safe
Mike & Katya	30 (7, 7, 8, 8)	Charleston	"Those Magnificent Men in their Flying Machines" — The Ron Goodwin Orchestra	Bottom two

Judges' votes to save

- Revel Horwood: Mike & Katya
- Mabuse: Mike & Katya
- Tonioli: Mike & Katya
- Ballas: Did not vote, but would have voted to save Mike & Katya

=== Week 8 ===
Musical guest: Luke Evans — "Bring Him Home" (from Les Misérables)

Couples are listed in the order they performed.

Couple	Scores	Dance	Music	Result
Alex & Neil	31 (7, 8, 8, 8)	Jive	"Let's Twist Again" — Chubby Checker	Safe
Mike & Katya	25 (5, 7, 7, 6)	Paso doble	"Tamacun" — Rodrigo y Gabriela	Eliminated
Karim & Amy	30 (6, 8, 8, 8)	Viennese waltz	"Give Me Love" — Ed Sheeran	Safe
Chris & Karen	26 (5, 7, 7, 7)	Tango	"Survivor" — 2WEI	Safe
Michelle & Giovanni	36 (9, 9, 9, 9)	American Smooth	"I Just Want to Make Love to You" — Etta James	Bottom two
Emma B. & Anton	33 (8, 9, 8, 8)	Theatre/Jazz	"Right Now" — The Pussycat Dolls	Safe
Saffron & AJ	39 (9, 10, 10, 10)	Waltz	"Your Song" — Ellie Goulding	Safe
Kelvin & Oti	35 (8, 9, 9, 9)	Salsa	"Let's Hear It for the Boy" — Deniece Williams	Safe

Judges' votes to save

- Revel Horwood: Michelle & Giovanni
- Mabuse: Michelle & Giovanni
- Tonioli: Michelle & Giovanni
- Ballas: Did not vote, but would have voted to save Michelle & Giovanni

=== Week 9: Blackpool Week ===
Musical guests: Westlife — "Hello My Love", "Uptown Girl" & "World of Our Own"

This week's episode was staged in the Tower Ballroom at the Blackpool Tower in Blackpool, Lancashire.

Couples are listed in the order they performed.

Couple	Scores	Dance	Music	Result
Chris & Karen	33 (7, 8, 9, 9)	Salsa	"Uptown Funk" — Mark Ronson, feat. Bruno Mars	Safe
Emma B. & Anton	37 (8, 9, 10, 10)	American Smooth	"Let's Face the Music and Dance" — Ella Fitzgerald	Safe
Alex & Neil	34 (8, 8, 9, 9)	Paso doble	"Run the World (Girls)" — Beyoncé	Safe
Kelvin & Oti	39 (9, 10, 10, 10)	Jive	"Jailhouse Rock" — from Smokey Joe's Cafe	Safe
Saffron & AJ	35 (8, 9, 9, 9)	Quickstep	"I Went to a Marvellous Party" — Beverley Knight	Bottom two
Michelle & Giovanni	32 (8, 8, 8, 8)	Street/Commercial	"Vogue" — Madonna	Eliminated
Karim & Amy	39 (9, 10, 10, 10)	Charleston	"Happy" — C2C, feat. Derek Martin	Safe

Judges' votes to save

- Revel Horwood: Saffron & AJ
- Mabuse: Saffron & AJ
- Tonioli: Saffron & AJ
- Ballas: Did not vote, but would have voted to save Saffron & AJ

=== Week 10 ===
Musical guest: Andrea Bocelli — "Return to Love" & "Time to Say Goodbye"
Dance guest: Ellie Fergusson — "Keeping Your Head Up"

Couples are listed in the order they performed.

Couple	Scores	Dance	Music	Result
Saffron & AJ	26 (5, 7, 7, 7)	Samba	"Walking on Sunshine" — Take Me to Rio Collective	Eliminated
Karim & Amy	38 (9, 9, 10, 10)	Contemporary	"Drops of Jupiter (Tell Me)" — With Confidence	Bottom two
Alex & Neil	26 (4, 7, 7, 8)	Argentine tango	"Never Tear Us Apart" — Bishop Briggs	Safe
Kelvin & Oti	38 (8, 10, 10, 10)	Street/Commercial	"Do I Love You (Indeed I Do)" — Frank Wilson	Safe
Emma B. & Anton	29 (6, 8, 7, 8)	Quickstep	"Sparkling Diamonds" — Nicole Kidman	Safe
Chris & Karen	31 (8, 8, 8, 7)	Paso doble	"Run Boy Run" — Woodkid	Safe

Judges' votes to save

- Revel Horwood: Karim & Amy
- Mabuse: Karim & Amy
- Tonioli: Karim & Amy
- Ballas: Did not vote, but would have voted to save Karim & Amy

=== Week 11: Musicals Week (Quarter-final) ===
Musical guests:

- Beverley Knight — "Memory" (from Cats)
- Idina Menzel — "Seasons of Love" (from Rent)

Couples are listed in the order they performed.

Couple	Scores	Dance	Music	Musical	Result
Chris & Karen	28 (6, 7, 8, 7)	Foxtrot	"Consider Yourself"	Oliver!	Bottom two
Alex & Neil	27 (6, 7, 7, 7)	Samba	"Joyful, Joyful"	Sister Act 2: Back in the Habit	Eliminated
Kelvin & Oti	39 (9, 10, 10, 10)	American Smooth	"Gaston"	Beauty and the Beast	Safe
Karim & Amy	40 (10, 10, 10, 10)	Jive	"You Can't Stop the Beat"	Hairspray	Safe
Emma B. & Anton	39 (9, 10, 10, 10)	Charleston	"Thoroughly Modern Millie"	Thoroughly Modern Millie	Safe

Judges' votes to save

- Revel Horwood: Alex & Neil
- Mabuse: Alex & Neil
- Tonioli: Chris & Karen
- Ballas: Chris & Karen (Since the other judges were not unanimous, Shirley Ballas, as head judge, made the final decision to save Chris & Karen.)

=== Week 12: Semi-final ===
Musical guest: Niall Horan — "Nice to Meet Ya"
Dance guest: Carlos Acosta — "Overture from Carmen"

Each couple performed two routines, and are listed in the order they performed.

Couple	Scores	Dance	Music	Result
Emma B. & Anton	31 (7, 8, 8, 8)	Cha-cha-cha	"Hold My Hand" — Jess Glynne	Safe
Emma B. & Anton	36 (8, 9, 9, 10)	Waltz	"Gymnopédie No. 1" — Erik Satie	Safe
Kelvin & Oti	40 (10, 10, 10, 10)	Quickstep	"The Lady Is a Tramp" — Cast of Glee	Safe
Kelvin & Oti	37 (9, 10, 9, 9)	Paso doble	"Seven Nation Army" — The White Stripes	Safe
Chris & Karen	26 (7, 7, 6, 6)	Viennese waltz	"Somebody to Love" — Queen	Eliminated
Chris & Karen	28 (4, 8, 8, 8)	Rumba	"Don't Watch Me Cry" — Jorja Smith	Eliminated
Karim & Amy	36 (8, 10, 9, 9)	Argentine tango	"Libertango" — Bond	Bottom two
Karim & Amy	38 (9, 10, 9, 10)	American Smooth	"Sweet Caroline" — Neil Diamond	Bottom two

Judges' votes to save

- Revel Horwood: Karim & Amy
- Mabuse: Karim & Amy
- Tonioli: Karim & Amy
- Ballas: Did not vote, but would have voted to save Karim & Amy

=== Week 13: Final ===
Musical guest: Taylor Swift — "Lover"

Each couple performed three routines: one chosen by the judges, their favourite dance of the season, and their showdance routine. Couples are listed in the order they performed.

NOTE: The winner was decided by public vote alone; judges scores were irrelevant

Couple	Scores	Dance	Music	Result
Karim & Amy	40 (10, 10, 10, 10)	Quickstep	"Mr. Pinstripe Suit" — Big Bad Voodoo Daddy	Runners-up
Karim & Amy	39 (9, 10, 10, 10)	Showdance	"A Million Dreams" — Pink	Runners-up
Karim & Amy	40 (10, 10, 10, 10)	Jive	"You Can't Stop the Beat" — from Hairspray	Runners-up
Emma B. & Anton	39 (9, 10, 10, 10)	Charleston	"Thoroughly Modern Millie" — from Thoroughly Modern Millie	Runners-up
Emma B. & Anton	38 (8, 10, 10, 10)	Showdance	"Let Yourself Go" — Irving Berlin	Runners-up
Emma B. & Anton	39 (9, 10, 10, 10)	Viennese waltz	"Send In the Clowns" — Barbra Streisand	Runners-up
Kelvin & Oti	39 (9, 10, 10, 10)	Rumba	"Ain't No Sunshine" — Bill Withers	Winners
Kelvin & Oti	40 (10, 10, 10, 10)	Showdance	"Shout" — The Isley Brothers	Winners
Kelvin & Oti	39 (9, 10, 10, 10)	Samba	"La Vida Es Un Carnaval" — Celia Cruz	Winners

== Dance chart ==
The couples performed the following each week:

- Weeks 1–11: One unlearned dance
- Week 12 (Semi-final): Two unlearned dances
- Week 13 (Final): Judges' choice, showdance & favourite dance of the series

Strictly Come Dancing (series 17) - Dance chart
Couple	Week															
Couple	1	2	3	4	5	6	7	8	9	10	11	12		13		
Kelvin & Oti	Samba	Waltz	Charleston	Rumba	Cha-cha-cha	Tango	Viennese waltz	Salsa	Jive	Street/Commercial	American Smooth	Quickstep	Paso doble	Rumba	Showdance	Samba
Karim & Amy	Cha-cha-cha	Foxtrot	Samba	Tango	Salsa	Paso doble	Quickstep	Viennese waltz	Charleston	Contemp.	Jive	Argentine tango	American Smooth	Quickstep	Showdance	Jive
Emma B. & Anton	Jive	Foxtrot	Salsa	Viennese waltz	Paso doble	Tango	Rumba	Theatre/Jazz	American Smooth	Quickstep	Charleston	Cha-cha-cha	Waltz	Charleston	Showdance	Viennese waltz
Chris & Karen	Cha-cha-cha	Charleston	American Smooth	Jive	Quickstep	Samba	Street/Commercial	Tango	Salsa	Paso doble	Foxtrot	Viennese waltz	Rumba			
Alex & Neil	Quickstep	Cha-cha-cha	Rumba	Tango	Charleston	Street/Commercial	American Smooth	Jive	Paso doble	Argentine tango	Samba					
Saffron & AJ	Tango	Cha-cha-cha	Paso doble	Contemp.	Foxtrot	Jive	Salsa	Waltz	Quickstep	Samba						
Michelle & Giovanni	Cha-cha-cha	Viennese waltz	Quickstep	Salsa	Rumba	Foxtrot	Paso doble	American Smooth	Street/Commercial							
Mike & Katya	Jive	American Smooth	Cha-cha-cha	Quickstep	Samba	Tango	Charleston	Paso doble								
Emma W. & Aljaž	Cha-cha-cha	Tango	Foxtrot	Jive	Viennese waltz	Charleston	Samba									
Will & Janette	Quickstep	Salsa	Paso doble	Foxtrot	Contemp.											
Catherine & Johannes	Viennese waltz	Samba	Rumba	Charleston	Tango	Cha-cha-cha										
David & Nadiya	Foxtrot	Paso doble	American Smooth	Quickstep	Jive											
Dev & Dianne	Foxtrot	Jive	Street/Commercial	Cha-cha-cha												
Anneka & Kevin	Cha-cha-cha	Waltz	Charleston													
James & Luba	Tango	Jive														

== Ratings ==
Weekly ratings for each show on BBC One. All ratings are provided by BARB.

Episode	Date	Official rating (millions)	Weekly rank for BBC One	Weekly rank for all UK TV
Launch show	7 September	9.26	1	2
Week 1	21 September	9.60	1	1
Week 2	28 September	9.46	1	1
Week 2 results	29 September	8.07	2	3
Week 3	5 October	9.99	1	1
Week 3 results	6 October	8.86	2	2
Week 4	12 October	10.08	1	1
Week 4 results	13 October	9.77	2	2
Week 5	19 October	10.40	1	1
Week 5 results	20 October	9.86	2	2
Week 6	26 October	10.72	1	1
Week 6 results	27 October	10.35	2	2
Week 7	2 November	10.92	1	1
Week 7 results	3 November	10.49	2	2
Week 8	9 November	10.45	2	2
Week 8 results	10 November	10.70	1	1
Week 9	16 November	11.51	1	2
Week 9 results	17 November	11.05	2	3
Week 10	23 November	10.87	1	6
Week 10 results	24 November	10.61	2	8
Week 11	30 November	10.92	2	3
Week 11 results	1 December	10.96	1	2
Week 12	7 December	11.03	1	1
Week 12 results	8 December	10.53	2	3
Week 13	14 December	12.76	1	1
Series average (excl. launch show)	2019	10.42	—N/a	—N/a
