= Kristina Rihanoff =

Russian dancer (born 1977)

- Кристина Риханофф
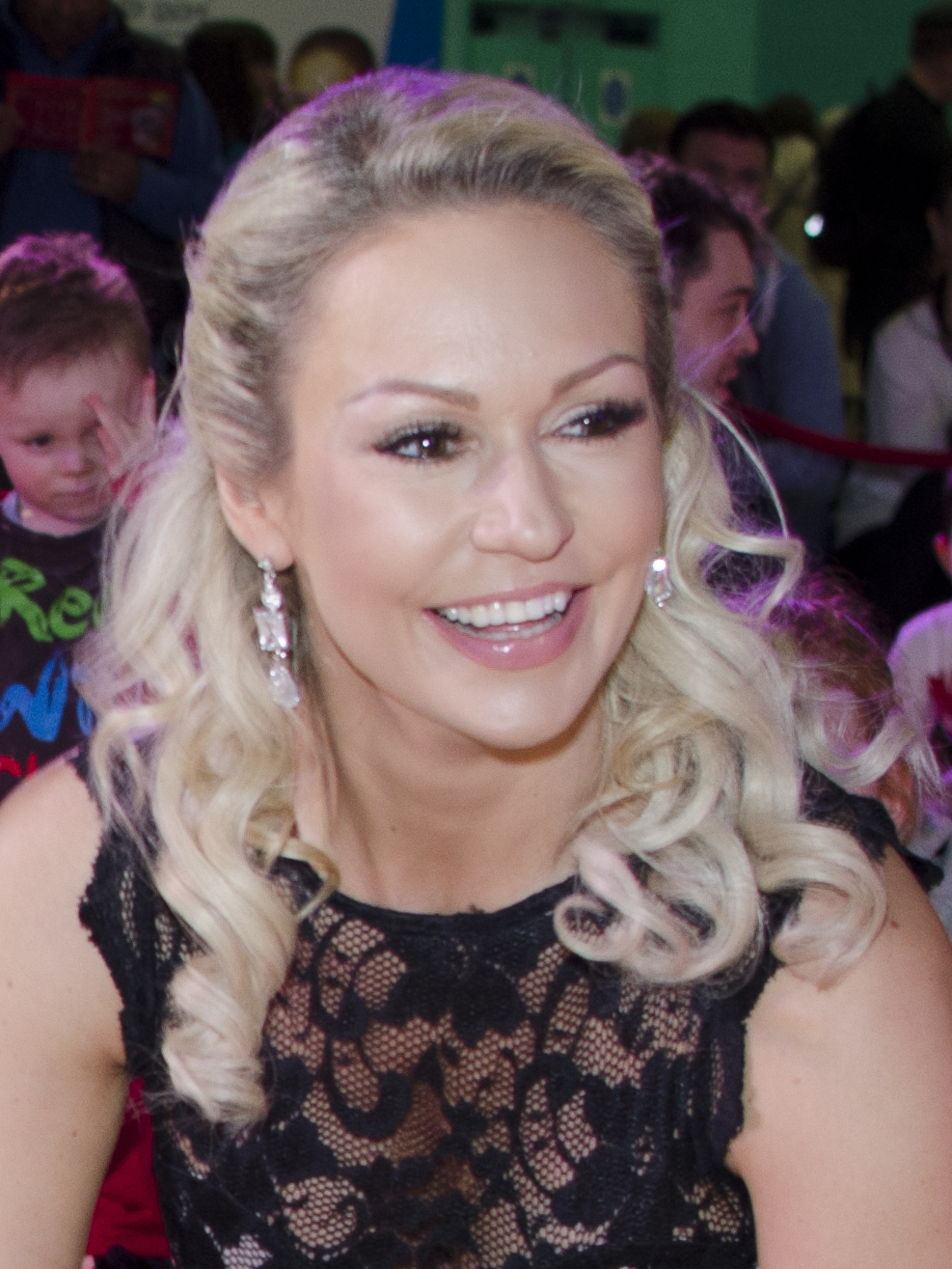
- Rihanoff in 2013
- Born: Kristina Pshenichnykh; 22 September 1977 (age 49); Vladivostok, Russian SFSR, Soviet Union
- Occupation: Dancer
- Television: Strictly Come Dancing (2008–15); Celebrity Big Brother 17 (2016)
- Partner: Ben Cohen
- Children: 1
- Parent: Igor Pshenichnykh
- Website: www.officialkristinarihanoff.com

Kristina Rihanoff (Russian: Кристина Пшеничных,: Kristina Pshenichnykh; born 22 September 1977) is a Russian professional ballroom dancer.

== Early life ==
The daughter of two engineers, Rihanoff was born and grew up in Vladivostok, Russia, and started taking dance lessons from aged 5. Her parents divorced when she was aged 12, during the time when the breakup of the Soviet Union was occurring. Living with her mother, aged 15 she became a part-time dance instructor to help the household budget, earning in a day what her professionally educated mother could earn in a month.

She has a degree in Tourism and Hospitality; after finishing public school she studied with St Petersburg Branch of Modern Humanitarian Academy.

== Dance career ==
Aged 21, she was asked to become an instructor to Russian dancers based in the United States. She also undertook displays and instructed on dance classes in the evenings. She developed her career over the next few years through a combination of teaching and performing, in the United States as well as choreographing shows in China, Hong Kong and Japan.

Continuing her professional dance career, she gained 1st place in the South African International Latin Championship (2005–2006), 2nd in the US National American Rhythm Finals (2003–2005), 2nd in the Open to the World, Mambo Championship (2003–2004), and was a semi-finalist at the Open to the World, Blackpool Dance Festival in 2007.

After being partnered with American professional Brian Fortuna, she has performed in the UK with Robin Windsor since 2011.

=== Strictly Come Dancing ===
==== Highest and lowest scoring performances per dance ====
| Dance | Partner | Highest | Partner | Lowest |
|---|---|---|---|---|
| American Smooth | Jason Donovan | 37 | Daniel O'Donnell | 23 |
| Argentine Tango | Jason Donovan and Simon Webbe | 40 | Colin Salmon | 26 |
| Cha Cha Cha | Jason Donovan | 32 | John Sergeant | 12 |
| Charleston | Simon Webbe | 39 | Daniel O'Donnell | 23 |
| Dance-a-thon | Jason Donovan and Simon Webbe | 4 | | |
| Foxtrot | Simon Webbe | 38 | Joe Calzaghe and John Sergeant | 20 |
| Jive | Jason Donovan | 34 | Joe Calzaghe | 21 |
| Paso Doble | Ben Cohen | 32 | Joe Calzaghe | 19 |
| Quickstep | Jason Donovan | 37 | Ben Cohen | 27 |
| Rumba | Ben Cohen and Jason Donovan | 28 | Simon Webbe | 23 |
| Salsa | Simon Webbe | 36 | Colin Salmon | 24 |
| Samba | Jason Donovan | 34 | John Sergeant | 16 |
| Showdance | Jason Donovan | 40 | Simon Webbe | 39 |
| Tango | Jason Donovan | 38 | Joe Calzaghe | 16 |
| Viennese Waltz | Jason Donovan | 35 | Colin Salmon | 24 |
| Waltz | Simon Webbe | 38 | John Sergeant | 22 |

Rihanoff competed as a professional dancer in the sixth series of Strictly Come Dancing in 2008. She was partnered up with political broadcaster and author John Sergeant. On 19 November 2008, Sergeant announced that he would be withdrawing from the series, leaving them in seventh place.

Rihanoff returned in 2009 to compete for the show's seventh series, in which she was partnered with professional boxer Joe Calzaghe. The couple were eliminated on week five of the competition, landing in eleventh place. Rihanoff and Calzaghe subsequently began a relationship, which lasted until 2013.

Rihanoff returned to compete for the show's eighth series in 2010, in which she was partnered with musician and DJ Goldie. The couple were eliminated on week two from the competition, landing in fourteenth place. Later in the year, she took part in and won the show's Christmas Special, partnering actor John Barrowman. On 15 June 2011, Rihanoff was announced as one of the professional dancers for the show's ninth series. She was partnered with Australian actor and singer Jason Donovan. The couple reached the final of the competition, and finished in third place.

Rihanoff returned to compete in the show's tenth series, partnering actor Colin Salmon. The couple were eliminated on the fifth week of the competition, landing in eleventh place. In 2013 (series 11), she was partnered with former England rugby player Ben Cohen. The couple were eliminated in the ninth week of the competition, finishing in eighth place.

In 2014, Rihanoff returned to compete in the show's twelfth series. She was partnered with Blue singer Simon Webbe. The couple reached the final of the competition, and finished as one of the runners-up. In 2015, she competed in the show's thirteenth series, partnering with Irish singer Daniel O'Donnell. They became the third couple to be eliminated from the competition, leaving in thirteenth place.

==== Performances and results ====
| Series | Celebrity partner | Place | Average Score |
|---|---|---|---|
| 6 | John Sergeant | 7th | 19.7 |
| 7 | Joe Calzaghe | 11th | 18.4 |
| 8 | Goldie | 14th | 23.0 |
| 9 | Jason Donovan | 3rd | 34.8 |
| 10 | Colin Salmon | 11th | 24.8 |
| 11 | Ben Cohen | 8th | 27.4 |
| 12 | Simon Webbe | 2nd | 33.1 |
| 13 | Daniel O'Donnell | 13th | 22.8 |

With celebrity partner John Sergeant

| Week # | Dance/song | Judges' score | | | | Total | Result |
| Week # | Dance/song | Revel Horwood | Phillips | Goodman | Tonioli | Total | Result |
|---|---|---|---|---|---|---|---|
| 1 | Waltz / "Come Away With Me" | 5 | 5 | 6 | 6 | 22 | Safe |
| 3 | Tango / "Boulevard of Broken Dreams" | 3 | 6 | 6 | 7 | 22 | Safe |
| 5 | Samba / "Papa Loves Mambo" | 2 | 4 | 5 | 5 | 16 | Safe |
| 6 | Paso Doble / "Concierto de Aranjuez" | 3 | 6 | 6 | 6 | 21 | Safe |
| 7 | Foxtrot / "I Wanna Be Loved by You" | 3 | 5 | 6 | 6 | 20 | Safe |
| 8 | Cha Cha Cha / "Twist and Shout" | 1 | 3 | 4 | 4 | 12 | Safe |
| 9 | American Smooth / "True Love Ways" | 5 | 6 | 7 | 7 | 25 | Safe |

With celebrity partner Joe Calzaghe

| Week # | Dance/song | Judges' score | | | | Total | Result |
| Week # | Dance/song | Revel Horwood | Goodman | Dixon | Tonioli | Total | Result |
|---|---|---|---|---|---|---|---|
| 1 | Tango / "Cite Tango" | 2 | 5 | 5 | 4 | 16 | Safe |
| 1 | Cha-Cha-Cha / "Chain of Fools" | 2 | 5 | 5 | 4 | 16 | Safe |
| 3 | Paso Doble / "Livin' on a Prayer" | 3 | 5 | 6 | 5 | 19 | Safe |
| 4 | Foxtrot / "Feeling Good" | 3 | 6 | 6 | 5 | 20 | Safe |
| 5 | Jive / "Rock This Town" | 4 | 6 | 6 | 5 | 21 | Eliminated |

With celebrity partner Goldie

| Week # | Dance/song | Judges' score | | | | Total | Result |
| Week # | Dance/song | Revel Horwood | Goodman | Dixon | Tonioli | Total | Result |
|---|---|---|---|---|---|---|---|
| 1 | Cha-Cha-Cha / "TiK ToK" | 3 | 6 | 6 | 5 | 20 | N/A |
| 2 | Foxtrot / "The Business of Love" | 6 | 7 | 7 | 6 | 26 | Eliminated |

With celebrity partner Jason Donovan

| Week # | Dance/song | Judges' score | | | | Total | Result |
| Week # | Dance/song | Revel Horwood | Goodman | Dixon | Tonioli | Total | Result |
|---|---|---|---|---|---|---|---|
| 1 | Cha-Cha-Cha / "Gimme Some Lovin'" | 8 | 8 | 8 | 8 | 32 | N/A |
| 2 | Foxtrot / "Why Don't You Do Right" | 8 | 8 | 9 | 8 | 33 | Safe |
| 3 | Tango / "I Will Survive" | 9 | 9 | 9 | 9 | 36 | Safe |
| 4 | Paso Doble / "I Want It All" | 6 | 7 | 7 | 7 | 27 | Safe |
| 5 | Quickstep / "Bewitched" | 9 | 9 | 10 | 9 | 37 | Safe |
| 6 | Rumba / "Killing Me Softly" | 6 | 8^{1} | 7 | 7 | 28 | Safe |
| 7 | Viennese Waltz / "Iris" | 8 | 9 | 9 | 9 | 35 | Safe |
| 8 | Jive / "Wake Me Up Before You Go-Go" | 8 | 8 | 9 | 9 | 34 | Safe |
| 9 | Charleston / "Yes Sir, That's My Baby" | 9 | 9 | 9 | 9 | 36 | Safe |
| 9 | Swing-a-thon / "Chattanooga Choo Choo" | Awarded | 4 | extra | points | 40 | Safe |
| 10 | American Smooth / "Singin' in the Rain" | 9 | 9 | 9 | 10 | 37 | Bottom two |
| 11 | Samba / "Blame It on the Boogie" | 8 | 9 | 9 | 8 | 34 | Safe |
| 11 | Argentine Tango / "Assassin's Tango" | 10 | 10 | 10 | 10 | 40 | Safe |
| 12 | Tango / "I Will Survive" | 9 | 10 | 10 | 9 | 38 | Third place |
| 12 | Showdance / "Dancin' Fool" | 10 | 10 | 10 | 10 | 40 | Third place |

^{1} Jennifer Grey temporarily replaced Goodman as a judge for week 6.

With celebrity partner Colin Salmon

| Week # | Dance/song | Judges' score | | | | Total | Result |
| Week # | Dance/song | Revel Horwood | Bussell | Goodman | Tonioli | Total | Result |
|---|---|---|---|---|---|---|---|
| 1 | Cha-Cha-Cha / "I Got You (I Feel Good)" | 4 | 7 | 6 | 6 | 23 | N/A |
| 2 | Viennese Waltz / "Kiss from a Rose" | 6 | 6 | 6 | 6 | 24 | Safe |
| 3 | Argentine Tango / "GoldenEye" | 7 | 7 | 6 | 6 | 26 | Safe |
| 4 | Salsa / "Superstition" | 5 | 7 | 6 | 6 | 24 | Bottom two |
| 5 | Foxtrot / "Ac-Cent-Tchu-Ate the Positive" | 6 | 7 | 7 | 7 | 27 | Eliminated |

With celebrity partner Ben Cohen

| Week # | Dance/song | Judges' score | | | | Total | Result |
| Week # | Dance/song | Revel Horwood | Bussell | Goodman | Tonioli | Total | Result |
|---|---|---|---|---|---|---|---|
| 1 | Cha-Cha-Cha / "Love Me Again" | 3 | 5 | 6 | 6 | 19 | N/A |
| 2 | Waltz / "What the World Needs Now Is Love" | 6 | 6 | 7 | 6 | 25 | Safe |
| 3 | Rumba / "Make You Feel My Love" | 7 | 7 | 7 | 7 | 28 | Safe |
| 4 | Salsa / "Hard to Handle" | 8 | 8 | 8 | 7 | 31 | Safe |
| 5 | Quickstep / "I'll Be There For You" | 6 | 7 | 7 | 7 | 27 | Safe |
| 6 | Paso Doble / "Supermassive Black Hole" | 7 | 8 | 9 | 8 | 32 | Safe |
| 7 | Jive / "Jump, Jive an' Wail" | 4 | 7 | 8 | 7 | 26 | Safe |
| 8 | American Smooth / "Fallin'" | 8 | 8 | 8 | 8 | 32 | Safe |
| 9 | Charleston / "No Diggity" | 6 | 7 | 7 | 7 | 27 | Eliminated |

With celebrity partner Simon Webbe

| Week # | Dance/song | Judges' score | | | | Total | Result |
| Week # | Dance/song | Revel Horwood | Bussell | Goodman | Tonioli | Total | Result |
|---|---|---|---|---|---|---|---|
| 1 | Jive / "Good Golly Miss Molly" | 6 | 7 | 7 | 7 | 27 | Safe |
| 2 | Tango / "Sing" | 5 | 7 | 7 | 7 | 26 | Safe |
| 3 | Rumba / "Take My Breath Away" | 4 | 6, 7^{1} | 6 | 7 | 30 | Bottom two |
| 4 | Charleston / "My Old Man (Said Follow the Van)" | 7 | 8 | 8 | 8 | 31 | Safe |
| 5 | Viennese Waltz / "Somebody To Love" | 7 | 7 | 7 | 7 | 28 | Bottom two |
| 6 | Paso Doble / "Poison" | 6 | 7 | 8 | 8 | 29 | Safe |
| 7 | Quickstep / "I Got Rhythm" | 7 | 9 | 9 | 8 | 33 | Safe |
| 8 | Argentine Tango / "El Tango De Roxanne" | 8 | 10 | 10 | 10 | 38 | Safe |
| 9 | Salsa / "Let's Hear It for the Boy" | 9 | 9 | 9 | 9 | 36 | Safe |
| 10 | Waltz / "Edelweiss" | 9 | 10 | 10 | 9 | 38 | Safe |
| 11 | American Smooth / "Heartache Tonight" | 8 | 9 | 9 | 9 | 35 | Bottom two |
| 11 | Waltz-a-thon / "The Last Waltz" | Awarded | 4 | extra | points | 39 | Bottom two |
| 12 | Samba / "I Like To Move It" | 6 | 8 | 9 | 7 | 30 | Safe |
| 12 | Foxtrot / "My Guy" | 9 | 10 | 10 | 9 | 38 | Safe |
| 13 | Charleston / "My Old Man (Said Follow the Van)" | 9 | 10 | 10 | 10 | 39 | Runners-up |
| 13 | Showdance / "A Little Less Conversation" | 9 | 10 | 10 | 10 | 39 | Runners-up |
| 13 | Argentine Tango / "El Tango De Roxanne" | 10 | 10 | 10 | 10 | 40 | Runners-up |

^{1} Donny Osmond appeared as a guest judge for week 3.

With celebrity partner Daniel O'Donnell

| Week # | Dance/song | Judges' score | | | | Total | Result |
| Week # | Dance/song | Revel Horwood | Bussell | Goodman | Tonioli | Total | Result |
|---|---|---|---|---|---|---|---|
| 1 | Waltz / "When Irish Eyes Are Smiling" | 4 | 6 | 7 | 7 | 24 | No Elimination |
| 2 | Charleston / "Let's Misbehave" | 5 | 6 | 6 | 6 | 23 | Safe |
| 3 | Cha-Cha-Cha / "Summer Nights" | 4 | 6 | 6 | 5 | 21 | Safe |
| 4 | American Smooth / "Fly Me to the Moon" | 5 | 6 | 6 | 6 | 23 | Eliminated |

==== Live tours and stage productions ====
Rihanoff has been taken part in the Strictly Come Dancing Live Tour from 2009 to 2015. In 2009 she performed with fellow professional dancer, Matthew Cutler and filled in for Lilia Kopylova at one show, partnering Julian Clary.On the Strictly 2010 tour, Rihanoff was partnered with Series 4 Champion Mark Ramprakash. They danced the Salsa and the Argentine Tango. On the Strictly 2011 tour, Rihanoff was partnered with actor Jimi Mistry, they danced the Foxtrot and Paso Doble. In 2012, 2014 and 2015 Rihanoff reunited with her dance partners from the television series, Jason Donovan, Ben Cohen and Simon Webbe, respectively. Rhianoff and Webbe went on to win the overall tour in 2015.

In 2012 Rihanoff and Robin Windsor joined fellow professional Artem Chigvintsev and former Strictly contestant Kara Tointon for the first 'Dance to the Music Tour'.

== Other projects ==
In Summer 2015, Rihanoff and Windsor took part in the Touring Theatre Production of Puttin' On The Ritz, as well as Dance Weekends around the county.

Rihanoff choreographs a number of professional and commercial dance works. These have included both Burn the Floor and Dancing on Wheels, which she choreographed with Fortuna. She has also choreographed dance routines inside the television commercials, including those for St Tropez suntan lotion, Panache bras and MeMeMe Cosmetics.

Rihanoff has written a book entitled The Art of Dancesport Makeup for newcomers to Ballroom dance competition, a subject that she studied extensively in Russia. Rihanoff participated in the 2008 Weakest Link's Strictly Come Dancing special. Rihanoff's weekly column in Best Magazine during each Strictly season has proved hugely popular. Rihanoff regularly appears in the mainstream media including Hello Magazine, Heat Magazine, OK, Best Magazine, Let's Talk etc.

Rihanoff has appeared in the Celebrity Version of Mastermind, with her specialist subject which was Patrick Swayze. Rihanoff has also appeared on The Hairy Bikers Programme, cooking the Traditional Russian Dish Borscht. Choreographing a couple of UK TV Adverts Including the BT Commercial and also Aviva Insurance.

In 2017, Rihanoff directed and choreographed 39-day tour Dance To The Music. The tour featured Rihanoff and Robin Windsor, Oksana and Jonathan Platero, and six more professional world-class dancers. In September 2017 Rihanoff launched her fashion line in collaboration with Pia Michi.

Rihanoff appeared as a guest in Netflix's Baby Ballroom in both seasons.

=== Celebrity Big Brother ===
On 5 January 2016, Rihanoff became a housemate in the 17th series of Celebrity Big Brother. On Day 3 she announced, in the house, she and boyfriend Ben Cohen were expecting a child, and that was roughly three months into her pregnancy. The pair were dance partners on the 2013 series of Strictly Come Dancing and at the time Cohen was still married to his former wife Abby. On 19 January 2016, Rihanoff became the third housemate to be evicted from the house, having received the fewest votes to save, spending a total of fifteen days in the house.

== Personal life ==
Rihanoff is a patron of children's charity called The Dot Com Foundation helping children deal with risky situations, whether it be violence within the home, to confidence building.

Following her well-publicised relationship with Joe Calzaghe, it was revealed in 2015 that another of her former partners, Ben Cohen, had left his wife Abby for Rihanoff, and in 2016 the couple had a daughter, Milena. In November 2022, Cohen and Rihanoff got engaged in the Maldives.

In 2017, it was reported that Rihanoff and Cohen had adopted a vegan diet to overcome health issues.
