= Strictly Come Dancing series 9 =

Strictly Come Dancing
- Series 9
- Presented by: Bruce Forsyth; Tess Daly; Claudia Winkleman
- Judges: Alesha Dixon; Len Goodman; Craig Revel Horwood; Bruno Tonioli; Jennifer Grey (guest)
- Celebrity winner: Harry Judd
- Professional winner: Aliona Vilani
- No. of episodes: 25

Release
- Original network: BBC One
- Original release: 10 September – 17 December 2011

Series chronology
- ← Previous; Series 8 Next → Series 10

Strictly Come Dancing returned for its ninth series on 10 September 2011 with a launch show, with the live shows beginning on 30 September and 1 October 2011. The show was broadcast from Wembley Arena on 19 November with all proceeds going to the BBC charity, Children in Need. The finale took place in the Tower Ballroom at the Blackpool Tower and was the first episode to air in 3D. It was shown on BBC HD and in cinemas around the country.

Sir Bruce Forsyth and Tess Daly continued to present the main show on BBC One, while the results show was presented by Daly and Claudia Winkleman. Former contestant Zoe Ball replaced Winkleman as the regular presenter of the spin-off show Strictly Come Dancing: It Takes Two due to Winkleman's family commitments. Alesha Dixon, Len Goodman, Craig Revel Horwood, and Bruno Tonioli returned as judges. On 5 and 6 November, Jennifer Grey, the winner of the eleventh series of Dancing with the Stars, served as a guest judge, replacing Len Goodman for the week. This was Alesha Dixon's last series as a judge after three years, which the BBC announced on 2 January 2012; she left the show to serve as a judge on a rival show, Britain's Got Talent.

Pasha Kovalev joined the cast this series as a new professional dancer.

McFly drummer Harry Judd and Aliona Vilani were announced as the winners on 17 December, while Waterloo Road actress Chelsee Healey and Pasha Kovalev finished in second place, and actor Jason Donovan and Kristina Rihanoff finished in third.

== Format ==
Hosts and Judges for Strictly Come Dancing Series 9

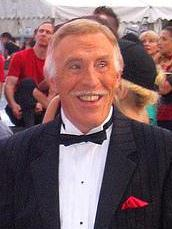
Bruce Forsyth

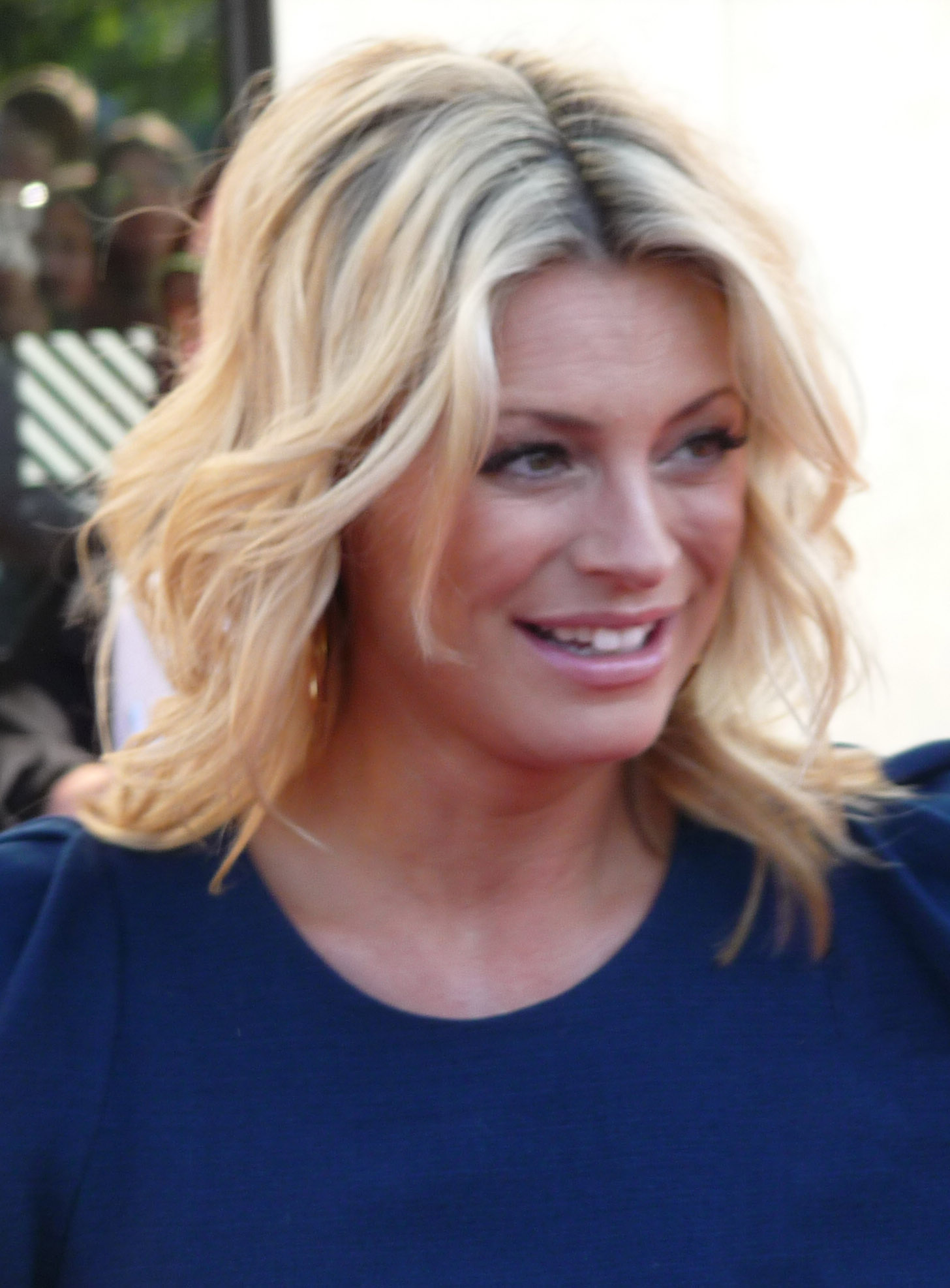
Tess Daly

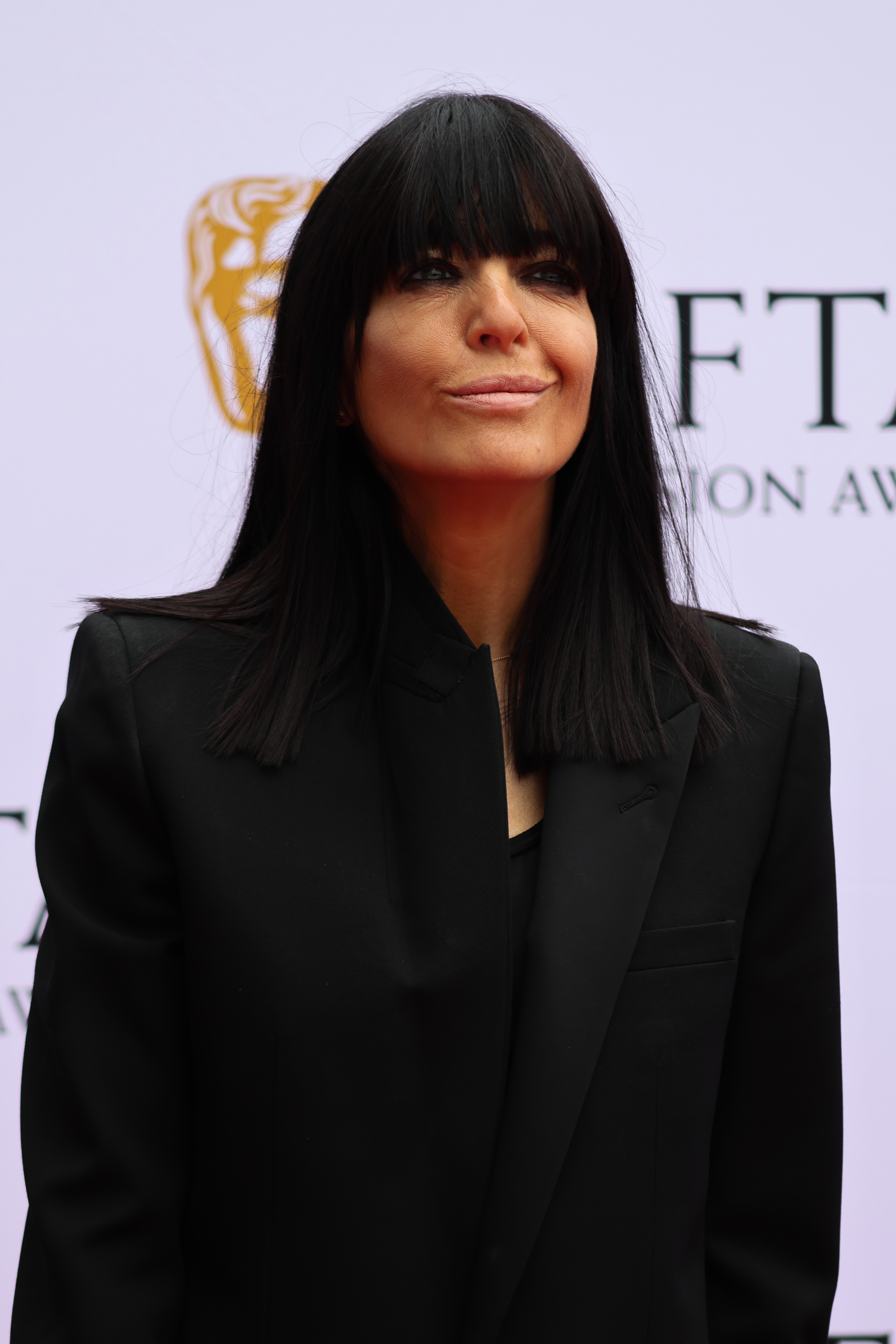
Claudia Winkleman

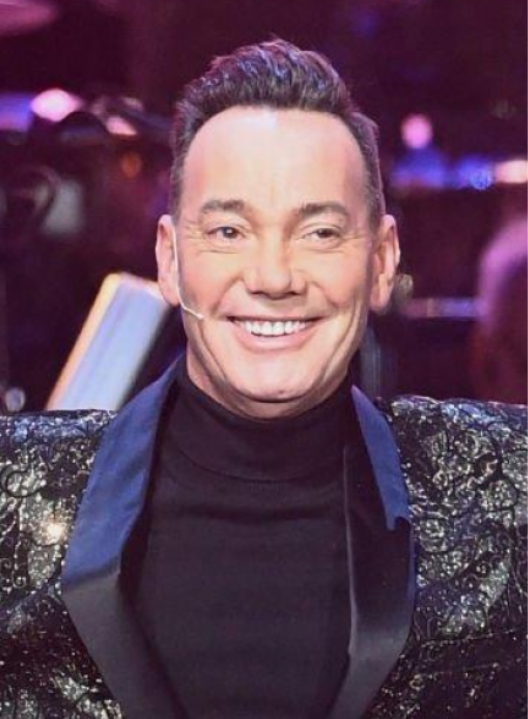
Craig Revel Horwood

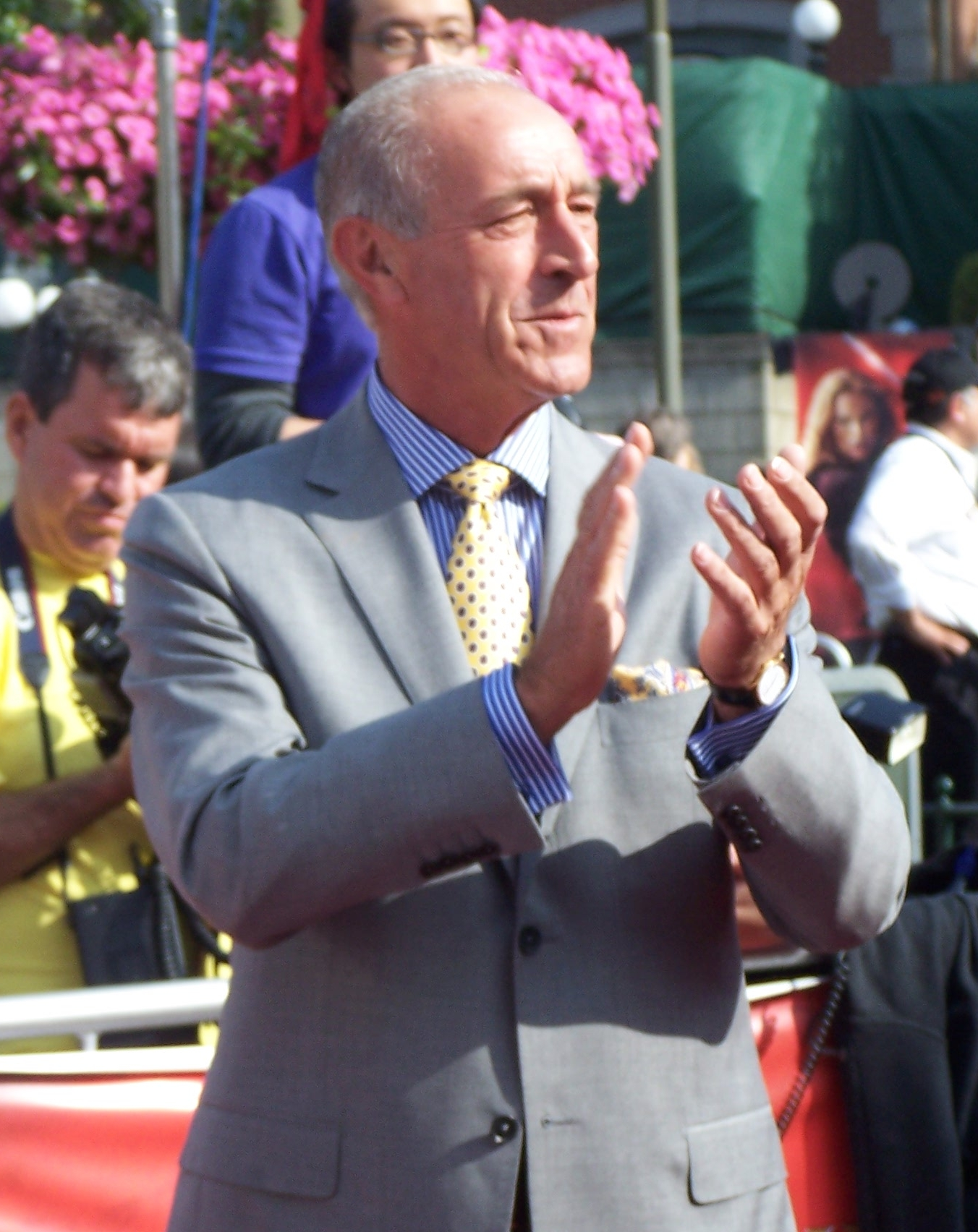
Len Goodman

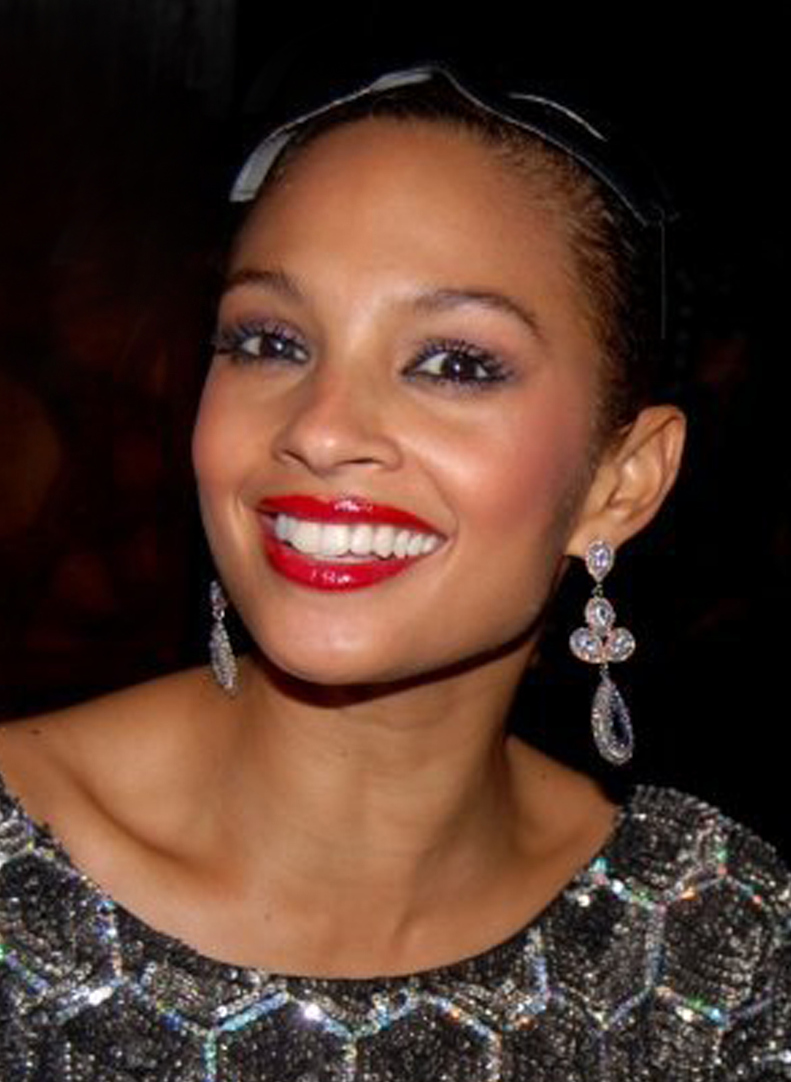
Alesha Dixon

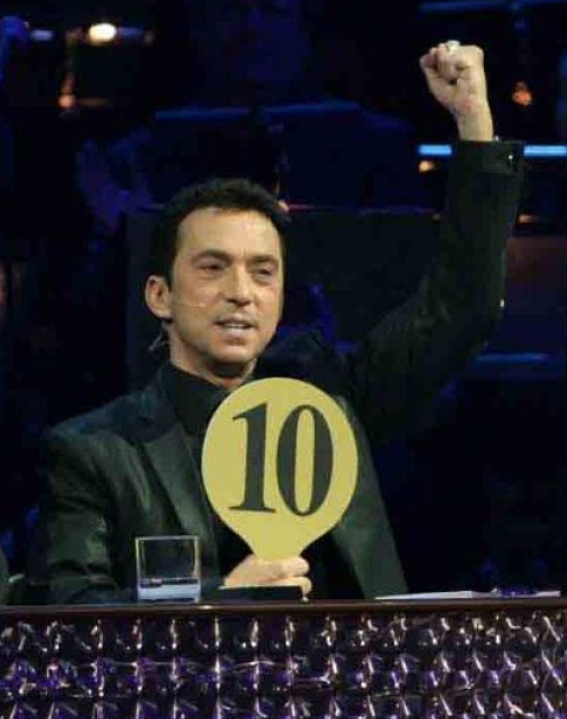
Bruno Tonioli

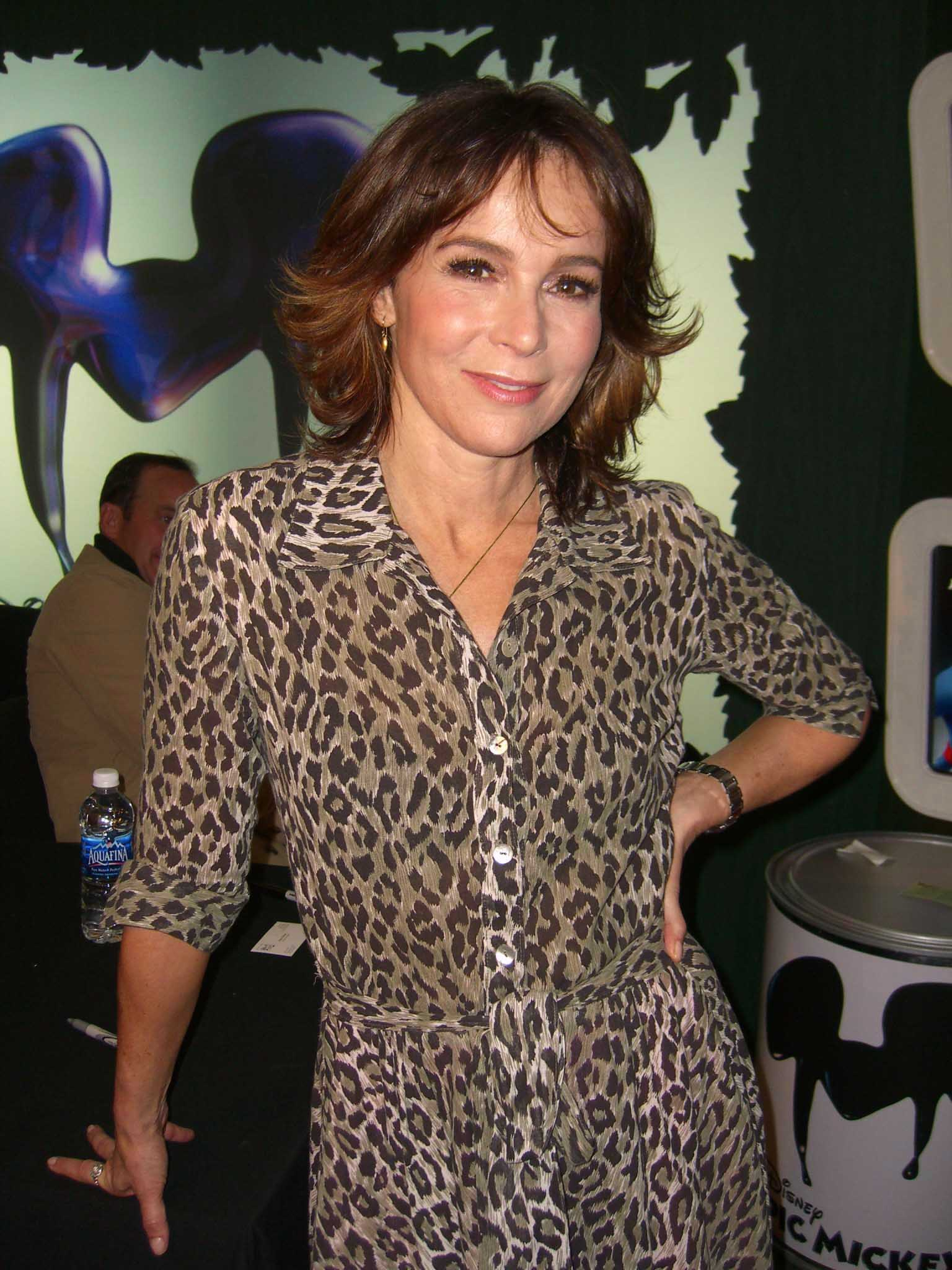
Jennifer Grey (Guest)

The couples dance each week in a live show. The judges score each performance out of ten. The couples are then ranked according to the judges' scores and given points according to their rank, with the lowest scored couple receiving one point, and the highest scored couple receiving the most points (the maximum number of points available depends on the number of couples remaining in the competition). The public are also invited to vote for their favourite couples, and the couples are ranked again according to the number of votes they receive, again receiving points; the couple with the fewest votes receiving one point, and the couple with the most votes receiving the most points.

The points for judges' score and public vote are then added together, and the couple with the fewest points is eliminated from the competition. The dance-off feature, where the judges choose which couple to save based on a final dance, was not utilised in this series. If two couples have equal points, the points from the public vote are given precedence.

== Couples ==
This series featured fourteen celebrity contestants. The full lineup of celebrities was revealed on 6 September 2011 on The One Show. As in the previous series, the celebrities did not know who would be their professional partner until they were introduced to each other at the launch show.

Celebrity	Notability	Professional partner	Status
Edwina Currie	Conservative Party politician	Vincent Simone	Eliminated 1st on 9 October 2011
Dan Lobb	Daybreak presenter & tennis player	Katya Virshilas	Eliminated 2nd on 16 October 2011
Rory Bremner	Comedian & impressionist	Erin Boag	Eliminated 3rd on 23 October 2011
Nancy Dell'Olio	Lawyer & media personality	Anton Du Beke	Eliminated 4th on 30 October 2011
Lulu	Singer-songwriter	Brendan Cole	Eliminated 5th on 6 November 2011
Audley Harrison	Heavyweight boxer	Natalie Lowe	Eliminated 6th on 13 November 2011
Russell Grant	Astrologer & entertainer	Flavia Cacace	Eliminated 7th on 20 November 2011
Anita Dobson	EastEnders actress	Robin Windsor; Brendan Cole (Week 9)	Eliminated 8th on 27 November 2011
Robbie Savage	Premier League footballer	Ola Jordan	Eliminated 9th on 4 December 2011
Alex Jones	The One Show presenter	James Jordan	Eliminated 10th & 11th on 11 December 2011
Holly Valance	Actress, singer & model	Artem Chigvintsev; Brendan Cole (Week 7)	Eliminated 10th & 11th on 11 December 2011
Jason Donovan	Actor & singer	Kristina Rihanoff	Third place on 17 December 2011
Chelsee Healey	Waterloo Road actress	Pasha Kovalev	Runners-up on 17 December 2011
Harry Judd	McFly drummer	Aliona Vilani	Winners on 17 December 2011

== Scoring chart ==
The highest score each week is indicated in bold green with a dagger (†), while the lowest score each week is indicated in italicized red with a double-dagger (‡).

Color key:

Winners
Runners-up
Third place
Bottom two
Eliminated

Strictly Come Dancing (series 9) - Weekly scores
Couple	Pl.	Week													
Couple	Pl.	1	2	1+2	3	4	5	6	7	8	9	10	11	12	
Couple	Pl.	1	2	1+2	3	4	5	6	7	8	9	10	11	Show 1	Show 2
Harry & Aliona	1st	28	27	55	33	35	34	33	**37**†	34	39+7=**46**†	36	39+39=**78**†	40+37=77	+39+40=**156**† (Note: This couple finished in first place.)
Chelsee & Pasha	2nd	27	29	56	30	**36**†	32	**36**†	36	**35**†	35+6=41	**39**†	36+40=76	39+36=75‡	+39+39=153‡ (Note: This couple finished in second place.)
Jason & Kristina	3rd	**32**†	**33**†	**65**†	**36**†	27	**37**†	28	35	34	36+4=40	37 (Note: This couple was in the bottom two, but was not eliminated.)	34+40=74	38+40=**78**† (Note: This couple finished in third place.)	
Holly & Artem	4th	28	30	58	30	30	35	34	34	31	34+3=37	38	36+34=70 (Note: This couple was eliminated.)		
Alex & James	5th	22	29	51	32	25	31	31	31	**35**†	29+5=34	34	34+31=65‡		
Robbie & Ola	6th	19	29	48	30	27	26	29	31	26	25+1=26‡	30‡			
Anita & Robin	7th	28	28	56	27	32	31	31	33	27	30+2=32				
Russell & Flavia	8th	21	25	46	28	24	22	24‡	26	24‡					
Audley & Natalie	9th	20	23	43	24	25	20	27	20‡						
Lulu & Brendan	10th	17	25	42	26	25	29	27							
Nancy & Anton	11th	12‡	14‡	26‡	20‡	18‡	14‡								
Rory & Erin	12th	27	22	49	31	24									
Dan & Katya	13th	24	21	45	24										
Edwina & Vincent	14th	17	19	36											

=== Average chart ===
This table only counts for dances scored on a traditional 40-point scale.

Couple	Rank by average	Total points	Number of dances	Total average
Harry & Aliona	1st	570	16	35.6
Chelsee & Pasha	2nd	564	16	35.3
Jason & Kristina	3rd	487	14	34.8
Holly & Artem	4th	394	12	32.8
Alex & James	5th	364	12	30.3
Anita & Robin	6th	267	9	29.7
Robbie & Ola	7th	272	10	27.2
Rory & Erin	8th	104	4	26.0
Lulu & Brendan	9th	149	6	24.8
Russell & Flavia	10th	194	8	24.3
Dan & Katya	11th	69	3	23.0
Audley & Natalie	12th	159	7	22.7
Edwina & Vincent	13th	36	2	18.0
Nancy & Anton	14th	78	5	15.6

== Weekly scores ==
Unless indicated otherwise, individual judges scores in the charts below (given in parentheses) are listed in this order from left to right: Craig Revel Horwood, Len Goodman, Alesha Dixon, Bruno Tonioli.

=== Week 1 ===
Half of the couples performed on the first night and the other half performed on the second night. Couples performed either the cha-cha-cha or the waltz. There was no elimination this week; all scores and votes carried over to the following week. Couples are listed in the order they performed.

Night 1 (Friday)

Couple	Scores	Dance	Music
Holly & Artem	28 (6, 7, 8, 7)	Cha-cha-cha	"Who's That Chick?" — David Guetta, feat. Rihanna
Dan & Katya	24 (4, 7, 7, 6)	Waltz	"Are You Lonesome Tonight?" — Elvis Presley
Lulu & Brendan	17 (2, 5, 5, 5)	Cha-cha-cha	"I've Got The Music in Me" — Kiki Dee
Audley & Natalie	20 (3, 5, 6, 6)	Waltz	"Angel" — Sarah McLachlan
Robbie & Ola	19 (2, 6, 6, 5)	Cha-cha-cha	"Bad Boys" — Alexandra Burke, feat. Flo Rida
Anita & Robin	28 (7, 7, 7, 7)	Waltz	"Three Times a Lady" — Commodores
Russell & Flavia	21 (4, 5, 6, 6)	Cha-cha-cha	"Venus" — Bananarama

Night 2 (Saturday)

Couple	Scores	Dance	Music
Harry & Aliona	28 (6, 7, 8, 7)	Cha-cha-cha	"Moves Like Jagger" — Maroon 5, feat. Christina Aguilera
Rory & Erin	27 (6, 7, 7, 7)	Waltz	"Weekend in New England" — Barry Manilow
Alex & James	22 (4, 6, 6, 6)	Cha-cha-cha	"When Love Takes Over" — David Guetta, feat. Kelly Rowland
Chelsee & Pasha	27 (7, 6, 7, 7)	Waltz	"See the Day" — Dee C. Lee
Edwina & Vincent	17 (2, 5, 5, 5)	Cha-cha-cha	"Build Me Up Buttercup" — The Foundations
Nancy & Anton	12 (1, 4, 3, 4)	Waltz	"In Napoli" — Dean Martin
Jason & Kristina	32 (8, 8, 8, 8)	Cha-cha-cha	"Gimme Some Lovin'" — The Spencer Davis Group

=== Week 2 ===
Musical guest: Will Young – "Come On"

Couples performed either the foxtrot or the salsa, and are listed in the order they performed.

Couple	Scores	Dance	Music	Result
Chelsee & Pasha	29 (7, 7, 8, 7)	Salsa	"Higher" — Taio Cruz, feat. Kylie Minogue	Safe
Edwina & Vincent	19 (4, 5, 5, 5)	Foxtrot	"Buona Sera" — Dean Martin	Eliminated
Audley & Natalie	23 (5, 6, 6, 6)	Salsa	"Don't Stop 'Til You Get Enough" — Michael Jackson	Bottom two
Alex & James	29 (6, 8, 7, 8)	Foxtrot	"Have You Met Miss Jones?" — Frank Sinatra	Safe
Dan & Katya	21 (4, 6, 6, 5)	Salsa	"Upside Down" — Diana Ross	Safe
Lulu & Brendan	25 (5, 6, 7, 7)	Foxtrot	"Breakeven" — The Script	Safe
Holly & Artem	30 (7, 7, 8, 8)	Salsa	"Mas Que Nada" — Sergio Mendes & The Black Eyed Peas	Safe
Rory & Erin	22 (4, 6, 6, 6)	Salsa	"Vehicle" — The Ides of March	Safe
Robbie & Ola	29 (7, 8, 7, 7)	Foxtrot	"Ain't That a Kick in the Head?" — Dean Martin	Safe
Anita & Robin	28 (7, 7, 7, 7)	Salsa	"Jump in the Line (Shake, Senora)" — Harry Belafonte	Safe
Jason & Kristina	33 (8, 8, 9, 8)	Foxtrot	"Why Don't You Do Right" — Peggy Lee	Safe
Nancy & Anton	14 (3, 5, 2, 4)	Salsa	"Papa Loves Mambo" — Perry Como	Safe
Harry & Aliona	27 (6, 6, 8, 7)	Foxtrot	"Just the Way You Are" — Bruno Mars	Safe
Russell & Flavia	25 (6, 6, 6, 7)	Salsa	"Dancing Queen" — ABBA	Safe

=== Week 3: Broadway Night ===
Musical guests:

- Kenny Wormald & Julianne Hough — "Holding Out for a Hero" & "Footloose"
- Susan Boyle — "Unchained Melody"

Couples are listed in the order they performed.

Couple	Scores	Dance	Music	Broadway musical	Result
Holly & Artem	30 (7, 8, 7, 8)	Tango	"Cell Block Tango"	Chicago	Safe
Dan & Katya	24 (5, 7, 6, 6)	Viennese waltz	"Somebody to Love"	We Will Rock You	Eliminated
Anita & Robin	27 (6, 7, 7, 7)	Jive	"You Can't Stop the Beat"	Hairspray	Safe
Alex & James	32 (8, 8, 8, 8)	Viennese waltz	"Memory"	Cats	Safe
Rory & Erin	31 (7, 8, 8, 8)	Quickstep	"Top Hat, White Tie and Tails"	Top Hat	Safe
Lulu & Brendan	26 (5, 7, 7, 7)	Rumba	"All I Ask of You"	The Phantom of the Opera	Safe
Nancy & Anton	20 (4, 5, 5, 6)	Tango	"Be Italian"	Nine	Bottom two
Audley & Natalie	24 (5, 6, 6, 7)	Quickstep	"Too Darn Hot"	Kiss Me, Kate	Safe
Robbie & Ola	30 (7, 7, 8, 8)	Tango	"Gimme! Gimme! Gimme! (A Man After Midnight)"	Mamma Mia!	Safe
Russell & Flavia	28 (6, 7, 7, 8)	Foxtrot	"Don't Rain on My Parade"	Funny Girl	Safe
Jason & Kristina	36 (9, 9, 9, 9)	Tango	"I Will Survive"	Priscilla, Queen of the Desert	Safe
Chelsee & Pasha	30 (6, 8, 8, 8)	Cha-cha-cha	"Beggin'"	Jersey Boys	Safe
Harry & Aliona	33 (8, 8, 9, 8)	Jive	"Greased Lightnin'"	Grease	Safe

=== Week 4 ===
Musical guest: Caro Emerald – "That Man"

Couples are listed in the order they performed.

Couple	Scores	Dance	Music	Result
Jason & Kristina	27 (6, 7, 7, 7)	Paso doble	"I Want It All" — Queen	Safe
Alex & James	25 (4, 7, 7, 7)	Rumba	"Run" — Leona Lewis	Safe
Rory & Erin	24 (4, 7, 6, 7)	Cha-cha-cha	"Dance to the Music" — Sly and the Family Stone	Eliminated
Audley & Natalie	25 (6, 7, 6, 6)	Foxtrot	"I Just Don't Know What to Do with Myself" — Dusty Springfield	Safe
Nancy & Anton	18 (3, 5, 5, 5)	Paso doble	"Rodrigo's Guitar Concerto" — Joaquín Rodrigo	Bottom two
Lulu & Brendan	25 (5, 6, 7, 7)	Samba	"Sir Duke" — Stevie Wonder	Safe
Holly & Artem	30 (7, 7, 8, 8)	Viennese waltz	"Cry Me Out" — Pixie Lott	Safe
Chelsee & Pasha	36 (9, 9, 9, 9)	Quickstep	"Sing Sing Sing" — Benny Goodman	Safe
Harry & Aliona	35 (8, 8, 10, 9)	Waltz	"Come Away with Me" — Norah Jones	Safe
Anita & Robin	32 (8, 8, 8, 8)	American Smooth	"I've Got You Under My Skin" — Frank Sinatra	Safe
Robbie & Ola	27 (5, 8, 7, 7)	Jive	"Love Man" — Otis Redding	Safe
Russell & Flavia	24 (5, 6, 6, 7)	Tango	"Sweet Dreams (Are Made of This)" — Eurythmics	Safe

=== Week 5: Halloween Night ===
Musical guest: The Wanted – "Lightning"

Couples are listed in the order they performed.

Couple	Scores	Dance	Music	Result
Russell & Flavia	22 (4, 6, 6, 6)	Samba	"Better the Devil You Know" — Kylie Minogue	Safe
Chelsee & Pasha	32 (7, 8, 9, 8)	Tango	"Love Potion No. 9" — The Clovers	Safe
Audley & Natalie	20 (3, 6, 6, 5)	Jive	"Prologue (Little Shop of Horrors)" — from Little Shop of Horrors	Bottom two
Alex & James	31 (7, 8, 8, 8)	Paso doble	"Bring Me to Life" — Evanescence	Safe
Holly & Artem	35 (8, 9, 9, 9)	American Smooth	"Swan Lake" — Pyotr Ilyich Tchaikovsky	Safe
Nancy & Anton	14 (2, 5, 3, 4)	Rumba	"Spooky" — Dusty Springfield	Eliminated
Harry & Aliona	34 (8, 7, 10, 9)	Tango	"Psycho Killer" — Talking Heads	Safe
Robbie & Ola	26 (4, 7, 8, 7)	Paso doble	"Bad" — Michael Jackson	Safe
Anita & Robin	31 (7, 8, 8, 8)	Tango	"Devil Woman" — Cliff Richard	Safe
Lulu & Brendan	29 (6, 7, 8, 8)	Paso doble	"Highway to Hell" — AC/DC	Safe
Jason & Kristina	37 (9, 9, 10, 9)	Quickstep	"Bewitched" — Steve Lawrence	Safe

=== Week 6 ===
Individual judges scores in the chart below (given in parentheses) are listed in this order from left to right: Craig Revel Horwood, Jennifer Grey, Alesha Dixon, Bruno Tonioli.

Musical guests:

- Westlife – "Flying Without Wings"
- Bruce Forsyth – "Young and Foolish"

Couples are listed in the order they performed.

Couple	Scores	Dance	Music	Result
Lulu & Brendan	27 (5, 8, 7, 7)	Tango	"Kiss" — Prince	Eliminated
Audley & Natalie	27 (5, 8, 7, 7)	Viennese waltz	"I'm With You" — Avril Lavigne	Bottom two
Harry & Aliona	33 (8, 9, 8, 8)	Samba	"I Wish" — Stevie Wonder	Safe
Anita & Robin	31 (7, 8, 8, 8)	Charleston	"I Got Rhythm" — George Gershwin	Safe
Jason & Kristina	28 (6, 8, 7, 7)	Rumba	"Killing Me Softly with His Song" — The Fugees	Safe
Alex & James	31 (7, 8, 8, 8)	Quickstep	"It Don't Mean a Thing (If It Ain't Got That Swing)" — Duke Ellington	Safe
Robbie & Ola	29 (6, 8, 8, 7)	Waltz	"Love Ain't Here Anymore" — Take That	Safe
Russell & Flavia	24 (4, 7, 6, 7)	Paso doble	"Carmen" — Georges Bizet	Safe
Chelsee & Pasha	36 (9, 9, 9, 9)	Charleston	"Five Foot Two, Eyes of Blue" — Gene Austin	Safe
Holly & Artem	34 (8, 9, 8, 9)	Jive	"Runaway Baby" — Bruno Mars	Safe

=== Week 7 ===
Musical guests:

- Christina Perri – "Jar of Hearts"
- André Rieu & his Johann Strauss Orchestra – "We'll Meet Again"

Artem Chigvintsev missed this week due to a back injury; Holly Valance performed with Brendan Cole instead.

Couples are listed in the order they performed.

Couple	Scores	Dance	Music	Result
Alex & James	31 (7, 8, 8, 8)	Jive	"River Deep, Mountain High" — Ike & Tina Turner	Safe
Robbie & Ola	31 (7, 8, 8, 8)	American Smooth	"Sway" — Pussycat Dolls	Safe
Audley & Natalie	20 (3, 6, 6, 5)	Cha-cha-cha	"Uptight (Everything's Alright)" — Stevie Wonder	Eliminated
Harry & Aliona	37 (9, 8, 10, 10)	Argentine tango	"Asi se baila el tango" — from Take the Lead	Safe
Jason & Kristina	35 (8, 9, 9, 9)	Viennese waltz	"Iris" — Goo Goo Dolls	Safe
Chelsee & Pasha	36 (9, 8, 10, 9)	Foxtrot	"Doesn't Mean Anything" — Alicia Keys	Safe
Anita & Robin	33 (7, 9, 8, 9)	Argentine tango	"Tango" — from Cirque du Soleil	Bottom two
Holly & Brendan	34 (8, 8, 9, 9)	Rumba	"Leave Right Now" — Will Young	Safe
Russell & Flavia	26 (5, 7, 7, 7)	American Smooth	"I Am What I Am" — Gloria Gaynor	Safe

=== Week 8: Best of Britain Week ===
Musical guests:

- James Morrison & Jessie J – "Up"
- Il Divo – "Time to Say Goodbye"

This week's show was broadcast live from Wembley Arena. Couples are listed in the order they performed.

Couple	Scores	Dance	Music	Result
Robbie & Ola	26 (5, 7, 7, 7)	Salsa	"Let Me Entertain You" — Robbie Williams	Safe
Alex & James	35 (8, 9, 9, 9)	Tango	"Relax" — Frankie Goes to Hollywood	Safe
Holly & Artem	31 (7, 8, 8, 8)	Quickstep	"Valerie" — Mark Ronson, feat. Amy Winehouse	Bottom two
Anita & Robin	27 (6, 7, 7, 7)	Samba	"Come On Eileen" — Dexys Midnight Runners	Safe
Harry & Aliona	34 (8, 8, 9, 9)	Salsa	"I'm Still Standing" — Elton John	Safe
Russell & Flavia	24 (5, 6, 6, 7)	Jive	"Reach" — S Club 7	Eliminated
Chelsee & Pasha	35 (8, 9, 9, 9)	Samba	"Spice Up Your Life" — Spice Girls	Safe
Jason & Kristina	34 (8, 8, 9, 9)	Jive	"Wake Me Up Before You Go-Go" — Wham!	Safe

=== Week 9 ===
Musical guest: Cee Lo Green – "Anyway"

Due to his injury, Robin Windsor missed this week; Anita Dobson performed with Brendan Cole instead.

Each couple performed one routine, and then all couples participated in a swing dance marathon for additional points. Couples are listed in the order they performed.

Couple	Scores	Dance	Music	Result
Anita & Brendan	30 (7, 8, 7, 8)	Cha-cha-cha	"Uptown Girl" — Billy Joel	Eliminated
Holly & Artem	34 (8, 8, 9, 9)	Foxtrot	"Mamma Knows Best" — Jessie J	Bottom two
Alex & James	29 (6, 7, 8, 8)	Charleston	"Me and My Baby" — from Chicago	Safe
Robbie & Ola	25 (5, 7, 7, 6)	Samba	"You Sexy Thing" — Hot Chocolate	Safe
Chelsee & Pasha	35 (8, 9, 9, 9)	Argentine tango	"Una Musica Brutal" — Gotan Project	Safe
Jason & Kristina	36 (9, 9, 9, 9)	Charleston	"Yes Sir, That's My Baby" — Eddie Cantor	Safe
Harry & Aliona	39 (9, 10, 10, 10)	Quickstep	"Don't Get Me Wrong" — Pretenders	Safe
Robbie & Ola	1	Swing-a-thon (Swing Marathon)	"Chattanooga Choo Choo" — Glenn Miller	
Anita & Brendan	2	Swing-a-thon (Swing Marathon)	"Chattanooga Choo Choo" — Glenn Miller	
Holly & Artem	3	Swing-a-thon (Swing Marathon)	"Chattanooga Choo Choo" — Glenn Miller	
Jason & Kristina	4	Swing-a-thon (Swing Marathon)	"Chattanooga Choo Choo" — Glenn Miller	
Alex & James	5	Swing-a-thon (Swing Marathon)	"Chattanooga Choo Choo" — Glenn Miller	
Chelsee & Pasha	6	Swing-a-thon (Swing Marathon)	"Chattanooga Choo Choo" — Glenn Miller	
Harry & Aliona	7	Swing-a-thon (Swing Marathon)	"Chattanooga Choo Choo" — Glenn Miller	

=== Week 10: Movie Night (Quarter-final) ===
Musical guest: Alfie Boe – "Live and Let Die", "Nobody Does It Better" & "We Have All the Time in the World"

Couples are listed in the order they performed.

Couple	Scores	Dance	Music	Film	Result
Robbie & Ola	30 (7, 7, 8, 8)	Quickstep	"Little Green Bag"	Reservoir Dogs	Eliminated
Harry & Aliona	36 (9, 9, 9, 9)	Rumba	"(Everything I Do) I Do It for You"	Robin Hood: Prince of Thieves	Safe
Alex & James	34 (8, 8, 9, 9)	American Smooth	"Oh, Pretty Woman"	Pretty Woman	Safe
Holly & Artem	38 (9, 9, 10, 10)	Paso doble	"The Plaza of Execution"	The Mask of Zorro	Safe
Jason & Kristina	37 (9, 9, 9, 10)	American Smooth	"Singin' in the Rain"	Singin' in the Rain	Bottom two
Chelsee & Pasha	39 (9, 10, 10, 10)	Jive	"I'm a Believer"	Shrek	Safe

=== Week 11: Semi-final ===
Musical guests:

- Aloe Blacc – "I Need A Dollar"
- Military Wives with Gareth Malone – "Wherever You Are"

Each couple performed two routines, and are listed in the order they performed.

Couple	Scores	Dance	Music	Result
Harry & Aliona	39 (9, 10, 10, 10)	Charleston	"I'm Just Wild About Harry" — Peggy Lee	Safe
Harry & Aliona	39 (9, 10, 10, 10)	Viennese waltz	"This Year's Love" — David Gray	Safe
Alex & James	34 (7, 9, 9, 9)	Waltz	"(You Make Me Feel Like A) Natural Woman" — Aretha Franklin	Eliminated
Alex & James	31 (7, 8, 8, 8)	Salsa	"1–2–3" — Gloria Estefan	Eliminated
Chelsee & Pasha	36 (8, 9, 10, 9)	American Smooth	"Time After Time" — Cyndi Lauper	Safe
Chelsee & Pasha	40 (10, 10, 10, 10)	Paso doble	"Malagueña" — 101 Strings Orchestra	Safe
Holly & Artem	36 (9, 9, 9, 9)	Argentine tango	"Por una Cabeza" — Carlos Gardel	Eliminated
Holly & Artem	34 (8, 8, 9, 9)	Charleston	"We No Speak Americano" — Yolanda Be Cool & DCUP	Eliminated
Jason & Kristina	34 (8, 9, 9, 8)	Samba	"Blame It on the Boogie" — The Jackson 5	Safe
Jason & Kristina	40 (10, 10, 10, 10)	Argentine tango	"Assassin's Tango" — John Powell	Safe

=== Week 12: Final ===
Musical guest: Jessie J – "Price Tag"

This week's finale was staged in the Tower Ballroom at the Blackpool Tower in Blackpool, Lancashire. During the first show, each couple performed two routines, one of which was their showdance and the other of which was chosen by the judges. At the end of the first show, the couple was the lowest combined scores was eliminated. During the second show, each couple performed two additional routines, one of which was their favourite dance of the series. Couples are listed in the order they performed.

==== Show 1 ====
Couple	Scores	Dance	Music	Result
Harry & Aliona	40 (10, 10, 10, 10)	Quickstep	"Don't Get Me Wrong" — Pretenders	Safe
Harry & Aliona	37 (9, 9, 10, 9)	Showdance	"Great Balls of Fire" — Jerry Lee Lewis	Safe
Jason & Kristina	38 (9, 10, 10, 9)	Tango	"I Will Survive" — from Priscilla, Queen of the Desert	Third place
Jason & Kristina	40 (10, 10, 10, 10)	Showdance	"Dancin' Fool" — Barry Manilow	Third place
Chelsee & Pasha	39 (9, 10, 10, 10)	Jive	"I'm A Believer" — from Shrek	Safe
Chelsee & Pasha	36 (9, 9, 9, 9)	Showdance	"One Night Only" — from Dreamgirls	Safe

==== Show 2 ====
Couple	Scores	Dance	Music	Result
Harry & Aliona	39 (9, 10, 10, 10)	American Smooth	"Can't Help Falling in Love" — Michael Bublé	Winners
Harry & Aliona	40 (10, 10, 10, 10)	Argentine tango	"Asi se baila el tango" — from Take the Lead	Winners
Chelsee & Pasha	39 (9, 10, 10, 10)	Rumba	"Because of You" — Kelly Clarkson	Runners-up
Chelsee & Pasha	39 (9, 10, 10, 10)	Quickstep	"Sing Sing Sing" — Benny Goodman	Runners-up

== Dance chart ==
The couples performed the following each week:

- Week 1: One unlearned dance (cha-cha-cha or waltz)
- Week 2: One unlearned dance (foxtrot or salsa)
- Weeks 3–8: One unlearned dance
- Week 9: One unlearned dance & swing dance marathon
- Week 10: One unlearned dance
- Week 11: Two unlearned dances
- Week 12 (Show 1): Judges' choice & showdance
- Week 12 (Show 2): One unlearned dance & favourite dance of the series

Strictly Come Dancing (series 9) - Dance chart
Couple	Week																
Couple	1	2	3	4	5	6	7	8	9		10	11		12			
Harry & Aliona	Cha-cha-cha	Foxtrot	Jive	Waltz	Tango	Samba	Argentine tango	Salsa	Quickstep	Swing; Marathon	Rumba	Charleston	Viennese waltz	Quickstep	Showdance	American Smooth	Argentine tango
Chelsee & Pasha	Waltz	Salsa	Cha-cha-cha	Quickstep	Tango	Charleston	Foxtrot	Samba	Argentine tango	Swing; Marathon	Jive	American Smooth	Paso doble	Jive	Showdance	Rumba	Quickstep
Jason & Kristina	Cha-cha-cha	Foxtrot	Tango	Paso doble	Quickstep	Rumba	Viennese waltz	Jive	Charleston	Swing; Marathon	American Smooth	Samba	Argentine tango	Tango	Showdance		
Holly & Artem	Cha-cha-cha	Salsa	Tango	Viennese waltz	American Smooth	Jive	Rumba	Quickstep	Foxtrot	Swing; Marathon	Paso doble	Argentine tango	Charleston				
Alex & James	Cha-cha-cha	Foxtrot	Viennese waltz	Rumba	Paso doble	Quickstep	Jive	Tango	Charleston	Swing; Marathon	American Smooth	Waltz	Salsa				
Robbie & Ola	Cha-cha-cha	Foxtrot	Tango	Jive	Paso doble	Waltz	American Smooth	Salsa	Samba	Swing; Marathon	Quickstep						
Anita & Robin	Waltz	Salsa	Jive	American Smooth	Tango	Charleston	Argentine tango	Samba	Cha-cha-cha	Swing; Marathon							
Russell & Flavia	Cha-cha-cha	Salsa	Foxtrot	Tango	Samba	Paso doble	American Smooth	Jive									
Audley & Natalie	Waltz	Salsa	Quickstep	Foxtrot	Jive	Viennese waltz	Cha-cha-cha										
Lulu & Brendan	Cha-cha-cha	Foxtrot	Rumba	Samba	Paso doble	Tango											
Nancy & Anton	Waltz	Salsa	Tango	Paso doble	Rumba												
Rory & Erin	Waltz	Salsa	Quickstep	Cha-cha-cha													
Dan & Katya	Waltz	Salsa	Viennese waltz														
Edwina & Vincent	Cha-cha-cha	Foxtrot															

== Ratings ==
Weekly ratings for each show on BBC One. All ratings are provided by BARB.

Episode	Date	Official rating (millions)	Weekly rank for BBC One	Weekly rank for all UK TV
Launch show	10 September	8.31	4	6
Week 1 (Night 1)	30 September	9.14	2	6
Week 1 (Night 2)	1 October	8.75	3	9
Week 2	8 October	9.75	2	5
Week 2 results	9 October	10.26	1	3
Week 3	15 October	10.08	1	3
Week 3 results	16 October	9.88	2	5
Week 4	22 October	10.35	1	2
Week 4 results	23 October	10.18	2	3
Week 5	29 October	11.29	1	2
Week 5 results	30 October	10.96	2	3
Week 6	5 November	10.32	2	4
Week 6 results	6 November	11.11	1	3
Week 7	12 November	11.40	1	2
Week 7 results	13 November	11.14	2	3
Week 8	19 November	12.26	1	1
Week 8 results	20 November	11.37	2	2
Week 9	26 November	11.80	1	1
Week 9 results	27 November	11.19	2	3
Week 10	3 December	11.42	1	1
Week 10 results	4 December	11.06	2	3
Week 11	10 December	12.04	1	2
Week 11 results	11 December	11.32	2	3
Week 12	17 December	13.34	1	1
Week 12 results	17 December	13.16	2	2
Series average (excl. launch show)	2011	10.98	—N/a	—N/a
