= Strictly Come Dancing series 8 =

Strictly Come Dancing
- Series 8
- Presented by: Bruce Forsyth; Tess Daly; Claudia Winkleman
- Judges: Alesha Dixon; Len Goodman; Craig Revel Horwood; Bruno Tonioli
- Celebrity winner: Kara Tointon
- Professional winner: Artem Chigvintsev
- No. of episodes: 26

Release
- Original network: BBC One
- Original release: 11 September – 18 December 2010

Series chronology
- ← Previous; Series 7 Next → Series 9

Strictly Come Dancing returned for its eighth series on BBC One with a red carpet launch show on 11 September 2010, and the competitive live shows began on 1 October. According to BARB data, this series was the consistently highest-rated of the show to date, peaking at 14.28 million viewers.

Bruce Forsyth and Tess Daly returned to present the main show on BBC One. For the results show, Daly was joined by Strictly Come Dancing: It Takes Two presenter Claudia Winkleman. Alesha Dixon, Len Goodman, Craig Revel Horwood, and Bruno Tonioli all returned as judges.

Three professional dancers from the last series did not return for this series: Matthew Cutler, Brian Fortuna and Lilia Kopylova. Darren Bennett and Ian Waite did not receive celebrity partners but were featured in a newly introduced, dedicated "showdance troupe" that performed special group routines during the live shows. Three new professionals joined this series: Artem Chigvintsev, Jared Murillo, and Robin Windsor. For the eighth series, the set was totally revamped: the backstage room where scores were given was replaced by a tower above the dance floor so that the couples could watch as their teammates performed. During week 8, the live show was transmitted from the Tower Ballroom at the Blackpool Tower.

The celebrities did not know their professional partners until they were introduced to each other at the launch show. The series concluded on 18 December when EastEnders actress Kara Tointon and Artem Chigvintsev were announced as the winners, while television presenter Matt Baker and Aliona Vilani finished in second place, and psychologist Pamela Stephenson and James Jordan finished in third.

== Format ==
Hosts and Judges for Strictly Come Dancing Series 8

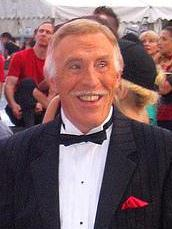
Bruce Forsyth

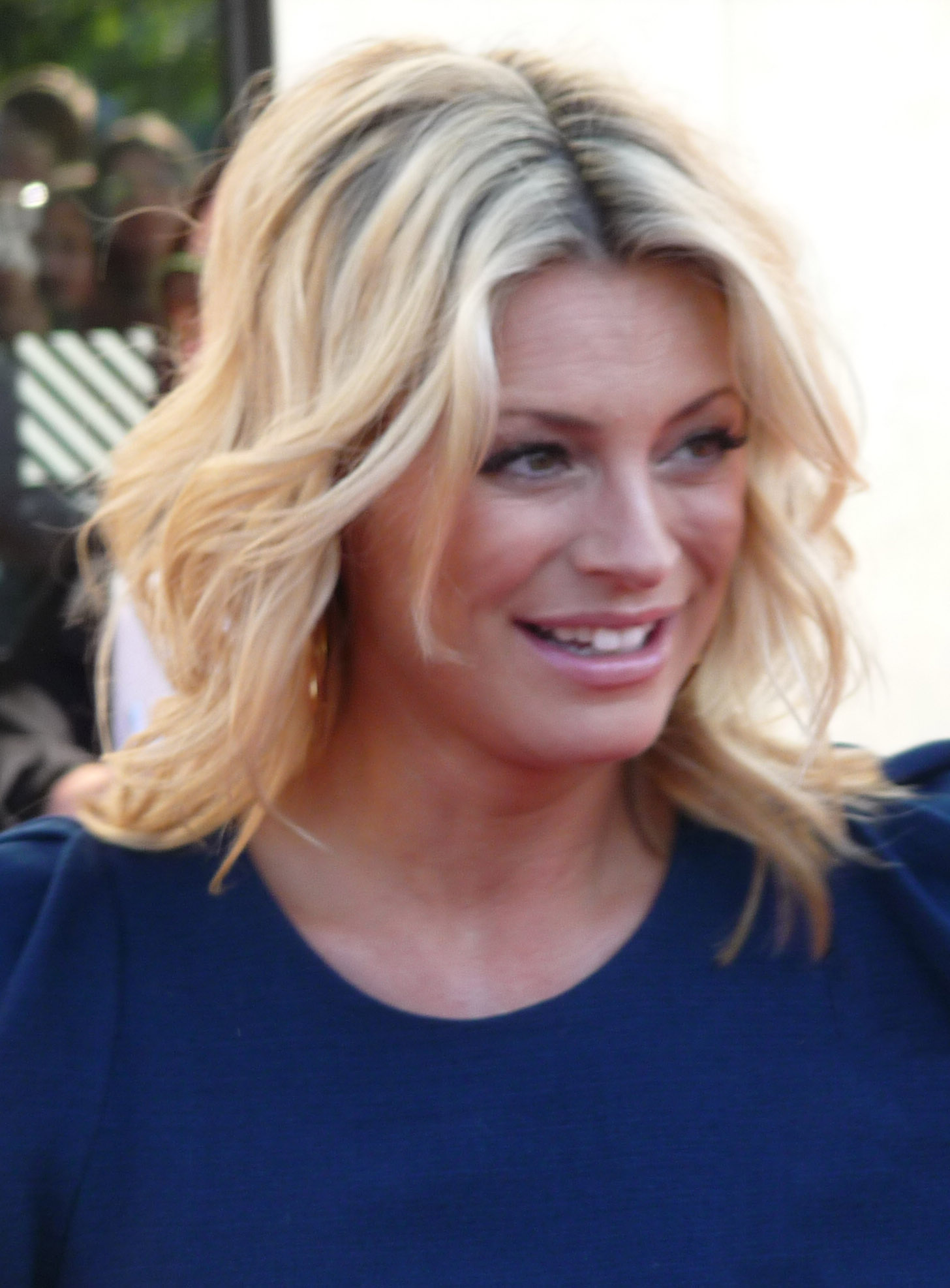
Tess Daly

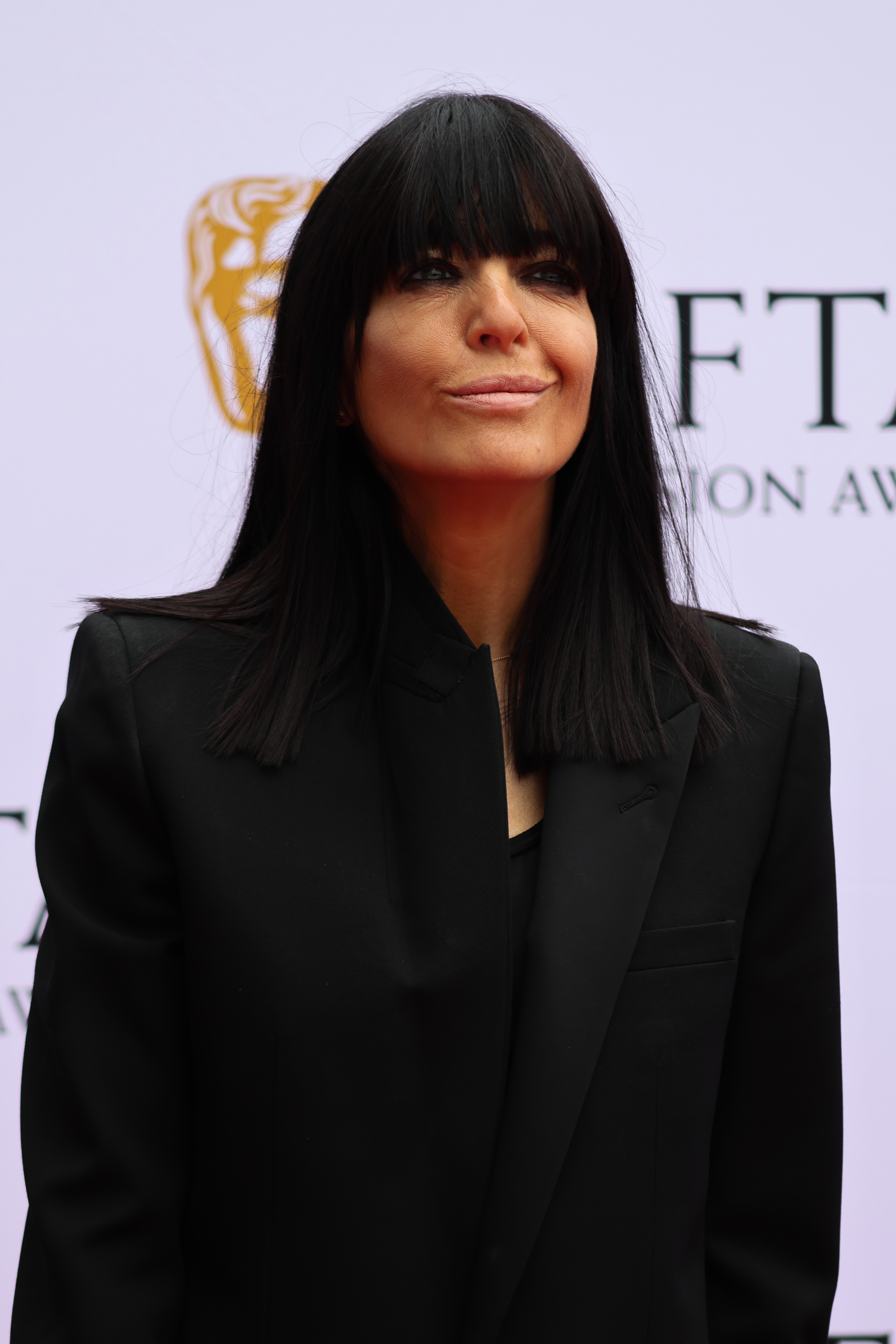
Claudia Winkleman

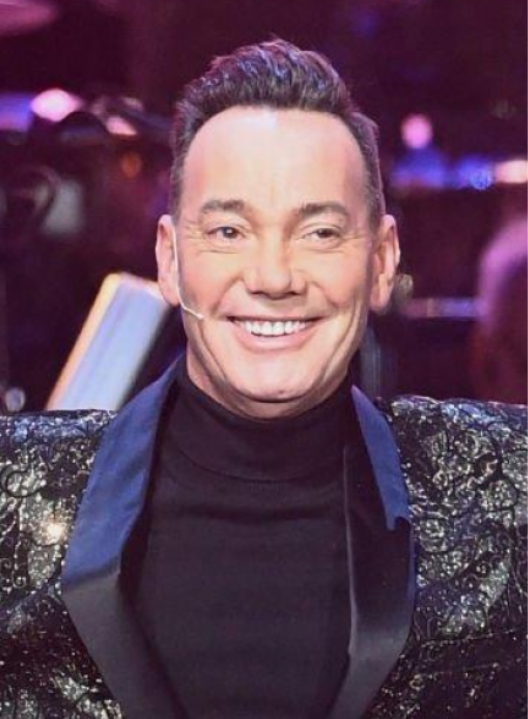
Craig Revel Horwood

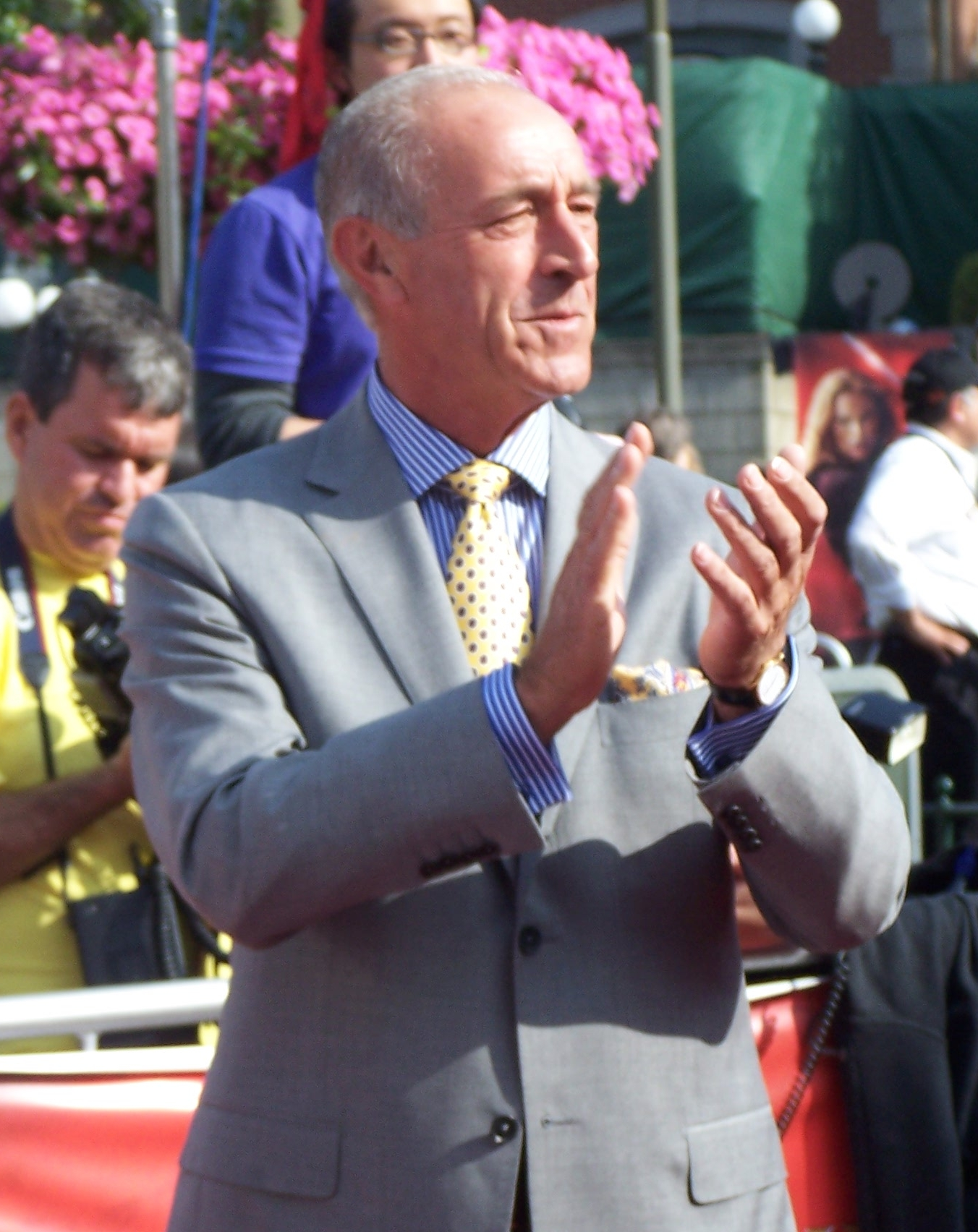
Len Goodman

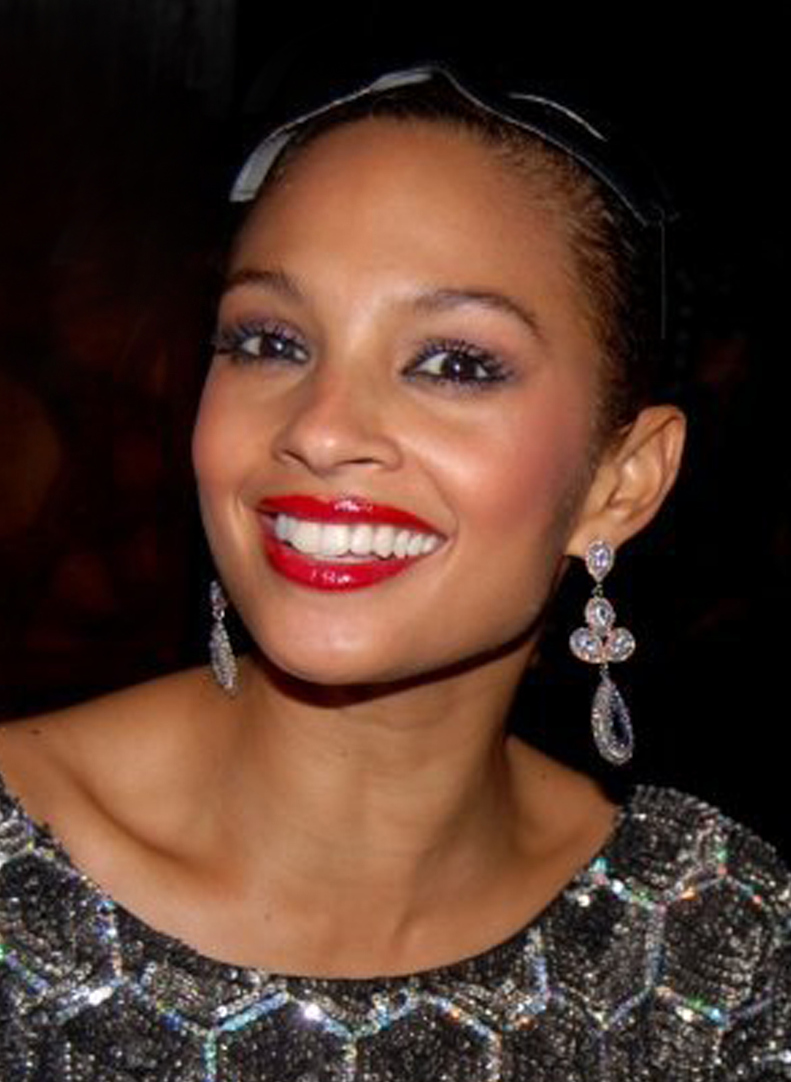
Alesha Dixon

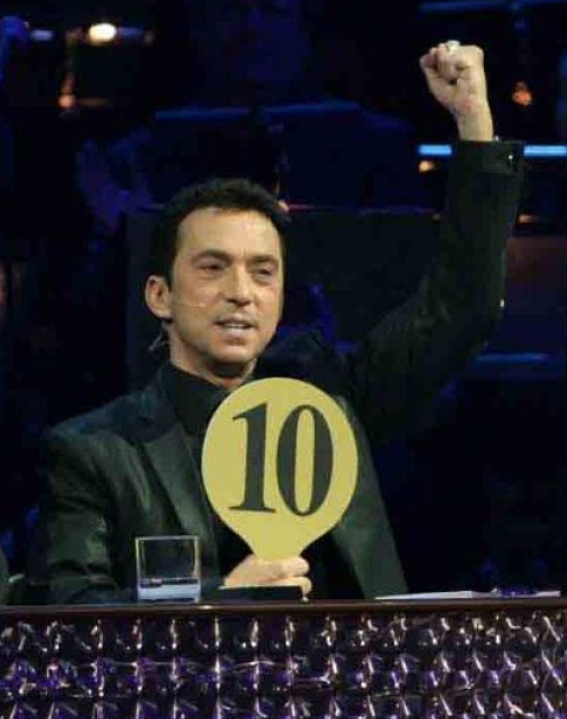
Bruno Tonioli

The couples dance each week in a live show. The judges score each performance out of ten. The couples are then ranked according to the judges' scores and given points according to their rank, with the lowest scored couple receiving one point, and the highest scored couple receiving the most points (the maximum number of points available depends on the number of couples remaining in the competition). The public are also invited to vote for their favourite couples, and the couples are ranked again according to the number of votes they receive, again receiving points; the couple with the fewest votes receiving one point, and the couple with the most votes receiving the most points.

The points for judges' score and public vote are then added together, and the couple with the fewest points is eliminated from the competition. The dance-off feature, where the judges choose which couple to save based on a final dance, was not utilised in this series. If two couples have equal points, the points from the public vote are given precedence.

== Couples ==
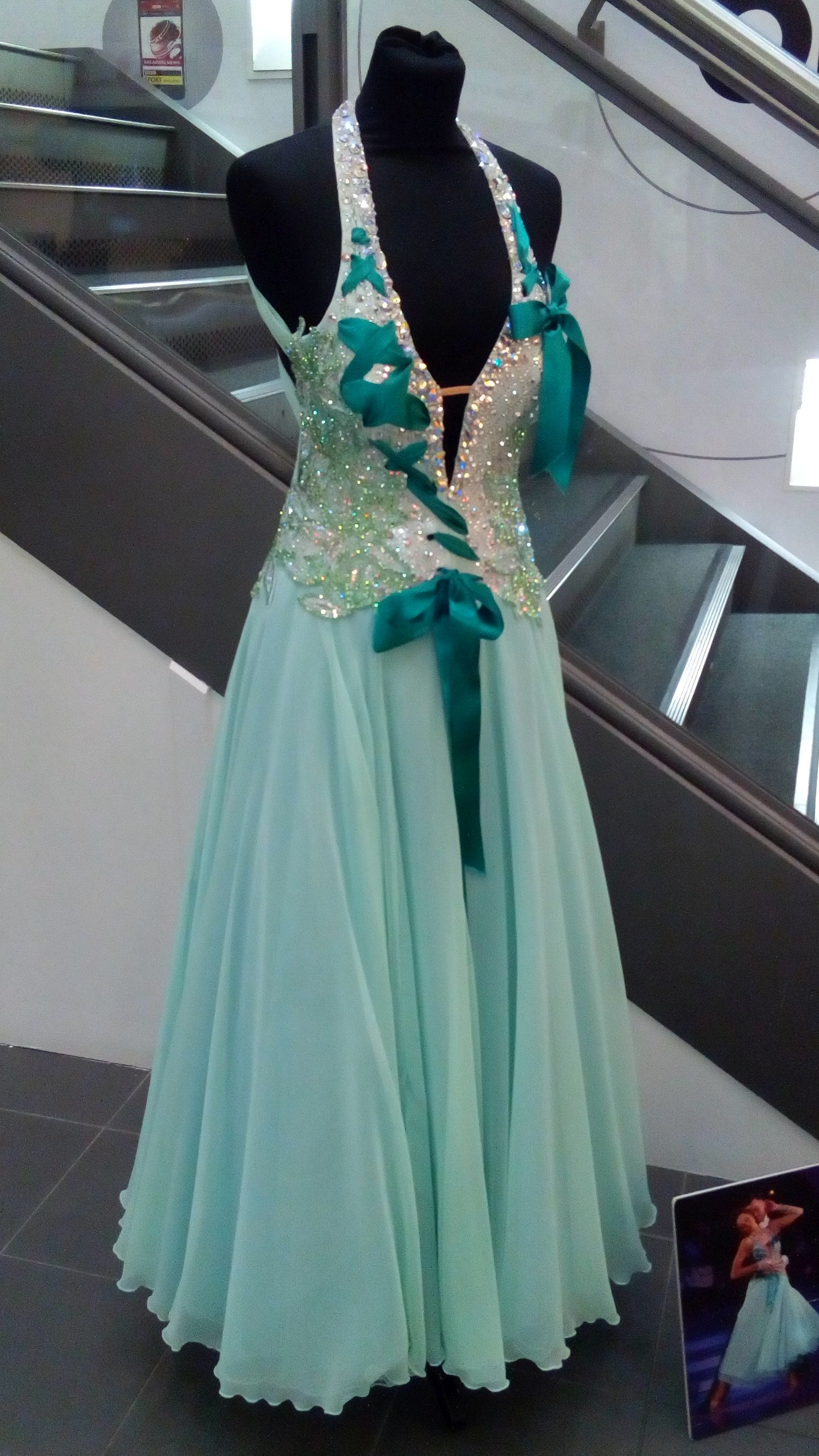
Peppermint-coloured ballroom dress worn by Kara Tointon in the series, which she won. Displayed at BBC Birmingham, it features "net underskirts, heavily stoned bodice and ribbon detailing".

This series featured fourteen celebrity contestants.

Celebrity	Notability	Professional partner	Status
Goldie	Musician & DJ	Kristina Rihanoff	Eliminated 1st on 10 October 2010
Paul Daniels	Magician	Ola Jordan	Eliminated 2nd on 17 October 2010
Peter Shilton	England goalkeeper	Erin Boag	Eliminated 3rd on 24 October 2010
Tina O'Brien	Coronation Street actress	Jared Murillo	Eliminated 4th on 31 October 2010
Jimi Mistry	Film & television actor	Flavia Cacace	Eliminated 5th on 7 November 2010
Michelle Williams	Destiny's Child singer	Brendan Cole; Ian Waite (Week 4)	Eliminated 6th on 14 November 2010
Felicity Kendal	Stage & screen actress	Vincent Simone	Eliminated 7th on 21 November 2010
Patsy Kensit	Film & television actress	Robin Windsor	Eliminated 8th on 28 November 2010
Ann Widdecombe	Conservative Party politician	Anton Du Beke	Eliminated 9th on 5 December 2010
Gavin Henson	Wales rugby player	Katya Virshilas	Eliminated 10th & 11th on 12 December 2010
Scott Maslen	EastEnders & The Bill actor	Natalie Lowe	Eliminated 10th & 11th on 12 December 2010
Pamela Stephenson	Comedian & psychologist	James Jordan	Third place on 18 December 2010
Matt Baker	Television presenter	Aliona Vilani	Runners-up on 18 December 2010
Kara Tointon	EastEnders actress	Artem Chigvintsev	Winners on 18 December 2010

== Dance troupe ==
The members of the dance troupe included Darren Bennett & Crystal Main, Ian Waite & Aneta Piotrowska, and Shem Jacobs & Tanya Perera.

The dance troupe performed the following:

- Launch show: Quickstep and jive, "Ballroom Blitz" — Sweet
- Week 2: Quickstep, "Hey, Soul Sister" — Train
- Week 5: Viennese waltz, "Never Tear Us Apart" — INXS
- Week 6: Rock 'n' Roll, "Rock 'n' Roll Is Here to Stay" — Danny and the Juniors, "Roll Over Beethoven" — Chuck Berry & "Shake, Rattle And Roll" — Bill Haley
- Week 7: Paso doble, "Radio" — Alesha Dixon
- Week 10: ABBA medley ("Mamma Mia", "Lay All Your Love on Me" & "Take a Chance on Me")
- Week 11: Paso doble, "Fire With Fire" — Scissor Sisters

== Scoring chart ==
The highest score each week is indicated in bold green with a dagger (†), while the lowest score each week is indicated in italicized red with a double-dagger (‡).

Color key:

Winners
Runners-up
Third place
Bottom two
Excused from competition for the week
Eliminated

Strictly Come Dancing (series 8) - Weekly scores
Couple	Pl.	Week													
Couple	Pl.	1	2	1+2	3	4	5	6	7	8	9	10	11	12	
Couple	Pl.	1	2	1+2	3	4	5	6	7	8	9	10	11	Show 1	Show 2
Kara & Artem	1st	30	**32**†	62	31	32	37	**36**†	38	35	34	38	39+5+39=**83**†	39+36=75	+38+37=**150**† (Note: This couple finished in first place.)
Matt & Aliona	2nd	**31**†	31	62	31	**35**†	34	35	35	**38**†	33	35	28+4+38=70	38+34=72‡	+35+37=144‡ (Note: This couple finished in second place.)
Pamela & James	3rd	**31**†	**32**†	**63**†	**35**†	34	27	33	32	37	**38**†	**40**†	35+3+40=78	40+37=**77**† (Note: This couple finished in third place.)	
Scott & Natalie	4th	29	**32**†	61	34	**35**†	**39**†	28	**39**†	32	31	35 (Note: This couple was in the bottom two, but was not eliminated.)	33+2+35=70 (Note: This couple was eliminated.)		
Gavin & Katya	5th	28	19	47	22	23	26	29	33	27	22	33	27+1+31=59‡		
Ann & Anton	6th	17	12‡	29‡	18	21	16‡	17‡	20‡	13‡	14‡	14‡			
Patsy & Robin	7th	22	28	50	24	28	31	29	32	28	30				
Felicity & Vincent	8th	23	25	48	29	29	26	29	26	30					
Michelle & Brendan	9th	24	26	50	24	27	29	30	24						
Jimi & Flavia	10th	26	30	56	25	27	30	32							
Tina & Jared	11th	24	26	50	(Note: This couple was excused from competition due to illness or injury, and was granted a bye to the following week.)	29	28								
Peter & Erin	12th	21	17	38	26	17‡									
Paul & Ola	13th	16‡	21	37	16‡										
Goldie & Kristina	14th	20	26	46											

=== Average chart ===
This table only counts for dances scored on a traditional 40-point scale.

Couple	Rank by average	Total points	Number of dances	Total average
Kara & Artem	1st	571	16	35.7
Pamela & James	2nd	491	14	35.1
Matt & Aliona	3rd	548	16	34.3
Scott & Natalie	4th	402	12	33.5
Jimi & Flavia	5th	170	6	28.3
Patsy & Robin	6th	252	9	28.0
Felicity & Vincent	7th	217	8	27.1
Tina & Jared	8th	107	4	26.8
Gavin & Katya	9th	320	12	26.7
Michelle & Brendan	10th	184	7	26.3
Goldie & Kristina	11th	46	2	23.0
Peter & Erin	12th	81	4	20.3
Paul & Ola	13th	53	3	17.7
Ann & Anton	14th	162	10	16.2

== Weekly scores ==
Unless indicated otherwise, individual judges scores in the charts below (given in parentheses) are listed in this order from left to right: Craig Revel Horwood, Len Goodman, Alesha Dixon, Bruno Tonioli.

=== Week 1 ===
Half of the couples performed on the first night and the other half performed on the second night. Couples performed either the cha-cha-cha or the waltz. There was no elimination this week; all scores and votes carried over to the following week. Couples are listed in the order they performed.

Night 1 (Friday)

Couple	Scores	Dance	Music
Felicity & Vincent	23 (4, 5, 7, 7)	Cha-cha-cha	"Sunny" — Bobby Hebb
Scott & Natalie	29 (6, 7, 8, 8)	Waltz	"I Never Loved a Man (The Way I Love You)" — Aretha Franklin
Goldie & Kristina	20 (3, 6, 6, 5)	Cha-cha-cha	"Tik Tok" — Ke$ha
Patsy & Robin	22 (4, 6, 6, 6)	Waltz	"When I Need You" — Leo Sayer
Matt & Aliona	31 (7, 8, 8, 8)	Cha-cha-cha	"Ain't No Mountain High Enough" — Marvin Gaye & Tammi Terrell
Pamela & James	31 (7, 8, 8, 8)	Waltz	"If I Ain't Got You" — Alicia Keys
Paul & Ola	16 (2, 5, 5, 4)	Cha-cha-cha	"Could It Be Magic" — Take That

Night 2 (Saturday)

Musical guests: Robbie Williams & Gary Barlow — "Shame"

Couple	Scores	Dance	Music
Jimi & Flavia	26 (6, 7, 6, 7)	Cha-cha-cha	"Don't Upset the Rhythm (Go Baby Go)" — Noisettes
Peter & Erin	21 (4, 6, 6, 5)	Waltz	"Take It to the Limit" — Eagles
Michelle & Brendan	24 (5, 6, 7, 6)	Cha-cha-cha	"Stone Cold Sober" — Paloma Faith
Gavin & Katya	28 (6, 8, 7, 7)	Waltz	"You Light Up My Life" — Debby Boone
Tina & Jared	24 (5, 7, 6, 6)	Cha-cha-cha	"California Gurls" — Katy Perry, feat. Snoop Dogg
Ann & Anton	17 (2, 5, 5, 5)	Waltz	"My Cherie" — Al Martino
Kara & Artem	30 (7, 8, 8, 7)	Cha-cha-cha	"I Like It" — Enrique Iglesias, feat. Pitbull

=== Week 2 ===
Musical guest: Robbie Williams — "Rock DJ"

Couples performed either the foxtrot or the salsa, and are listed in the order they performed.

Couple	Scores	Dance	Music	Result
Matt & Aliona	31 (7, 8, 8, 8)	Foxtrot	"She Said" — Plan B	Safe
Peter & Erin	17 (3, 5, 5, 4)	Salsa	"Mambo No.5" — Perez Prado	Bottom two
Tina & Jared	26 (6, 6, 7, 7)	Foxtrot	"On the Sunny Side of the Street" — Frankie Laine	Safe
Patsy & Robin	28 (7, 7, 7, 7)	Salsa	"Canned Heat" — Jamiroquai	Safe
Paul & Ola	21 (4, 6, 6, 5)	Foxtrot	"Lady Luck" — Brian Setzer	Safe
Scott & Natalie	32 (8, 8, 8, 8)	Salsa	"Let's Hear It for the Boy" — Deniece Williams	Safe
Michelle & Brendan	26 (6, 7, 7, 6)	Foxtrot	"It Had to Be You" — Harry Connick Jr.	Safe
Goldie & Kristina	26 (6, 7, 7, 6)	Foxtrot	"This Business of Love" — Domino	Eliminated
Pamela & James	32 (8, 8, 8, 8)	Salsa	"Dr. Beat" — Gloria Estefan	Safe
Felicity & Vincent	25 (6, 6, 6, 7)	Foxtrot	"Somethin' Stupid" — Frank Sinatra & Nancy Sinatra	Safe
Ann & Anton	12 (1, 4, 4, 3)	Salsa	"Mambo Italiano" — Dean Martin	Safe
Kara & Artem	32 (7, 8, 9, 8)	Foxtrot	"From Russia with Love" — Matt Monro	Safe
Gavin & Katya	19 (3, 6, 5, 5)	Salsa	"Don't Stop the Music" — Rihanna	Safe
Jimi & Flavia	30 (7, 7, 8, 8)	Foxtrot	"Fever" — Peggy Lee	Safe

=== Week 3 ===
Musical guest: Peter Andre — "Defender"

Tina O'Brien was unable to perform due to an illness. Under the rules of the show, she was granted a bye to the following week.

Couples performed either the quickstep or the rumba, and are listed in the order they performed.

Couple	Scores	Dance	Music	Result
Kara & Artem	31 (8, 8, 8, 7)	Quickstep	"Are You Gonna Be My Girl" — Jet	Safe
Felicity & Vincent	29 (7, 7, 8, 7)	Rumba	"True Colors" — Cyndi Lauper	Safe
Patsy & Robin	24 (5, 6, 7, 6)	Quickstep	"Black Horse and the Cherry Tree" — KT Tunstall	Safe
Paul & Ola	16 (2, 5, 5, 4)	Rumba	"Take a Bow" — Rihanna	Eliminated
Matt & Aliona	31 (8, 7, 8, 8)	Quickstep	"Dreaming of You" — The Coral	Safe
Gavin & Katya	22 (3, 6, 7, 6)	Rumba	"Always on My Mind" — Elvis Presley	Safe
Scott & Natalie	34 (8, 8, 9, 9)	Quickstep	"I Wan'na Be Like You" — Louis Prima	Safe
Michelle & Brendan	24 (4, 6, 7, 7)	Rumba	"Wicked Game" — Chris Isaak	Bottom two
Peter & Erin	26 (6, 7, 7, 6)	Quickstep	"Lullaby of Broadway" — Tony Bennett	Safe
Jimi & Flavia	25 (6, 7, 6, 6)	Rumba	"Ain't No Sunshine" — Bill Withers	Safe
Ann & Anton	18 (3, 5, 5, 5)	Quickstep	"Puttin' On the Ritz" — Fred Astaire	Safe
Pamela & James	35 (9, 8, 9, 9)	Rumba	"Make You Feel My Love" — Adele	Safe

=== Week 4 ===
Musical guest: Neil Diamond — "Midnight Train to Georgia"

Ian Waite filled in for Brendan Cole, who was attending his father's funeral.

Couples performed either the Charleston or the tango, and are listed in the order they performed.

Couple	Scores	Dance	Music	Result
Jimi & Flavia	27 (6, 7, 7, 7)	Charleston	"Do Your Thing" — Basement Jaxx	Safe
Scott & Natalie	35 (8, 9, 9, 9)	Tango	"Allegretto" — Bond	Safe
Tina & Jared	29 (7, 7, 8, 7)	Charleston	"You Give a Little Love" — from Bugsy Malone	Safe
Felicity & Vincent	29 (7, 7, 7, 8)	Tango	"Czardas" — Monti	Safe
Patsy & Robin	28 (6, 8, 7, 7)	Charleston	"Hot Honey Rag" — from Chicago	Safe
Gavin & Katya	23 (5, 6, 6, 6)	Tango	"Toxic" — Britney Spears	Safe
Peter & Erin	17 (2, 5, 6, 4)	Charleston	"Cabaret" — Liza Minnelli	Eliminated
Pamela & James	34 (8, 8, 9, 9)	Tango	"Love Is the Drug" — Roxy Music	Safe
Matt & Aliona	35 (9, 9, 9, 8)	Charleston	"42nd Street" — from 42nd Street	Safe
Michelle & Ian	27 (6, 7, 7, 7)	Tango	"Killer" — Adamski & Seal	Bottom two
Kara & Artem	32 (8, 8, 8, 8)	Charleston	"Put a Lid on It" — Squirrel Nut Zippers	Safe
Ann & Anton	21 (3, 7, 6, 5)	Tango	"La cumparsita" — Gerardo Matos Rodríguez	Safe

=== Week 5: Halloween Week ===
Musical guest: Alice Cooper — "Poison"

Couples are listed in the order they performed.

Couple	Scores	Dance	Music	Result
Pamela & James	27 (6, 7, 7, 7)	Jive	"Devil Gate Drive" — Suzi Quatro	Safe
Tina & Jared	28 (6, 8, 7, 7)	Argentine tango	"Beautiful Monster" — Ne-Yo	Eliminated
Kara & Artem	37 (9, 9, 10, 9)	Paso doble	"The Phantom of the Opera" — from The Phantom of the Opera	Safe
Patsy & Robin	31 (7, 8, 8, 8)	Jive	"Monster Mash" — Bobby "Boris" Pickett	Safe
Felicity & Vincent	26 (6, 7, 6, 7)	Viennese waltz	"Waltz No. 2" — Dmitri Shostakovich	Bottom two
Jimi & Flavia	30 (7, 7, 8, 8)	Paso doble	"Thriller" — Michael Jackson	Safe
Michelle & Brendan	29 (7, 6, 8, 8)	Jive	"The Time Warp" — from The Rocky Horror Show	Safe
Gavin & Katya	26 (5, 7, 7, 7)	Paso doble	"Uprising" — Muse	Safe
Scott & Natalie	39 (9, 10, 10, 10)	Viennese waltz	"I Put a Spell on You" — Screamin' Jay Hawkins	Safe
Ann & Anton	16 (2, 5, 5, 4)	Paso doble	"Wild Thing" — The Troggs	Safe
Matt & Aliona	34 (8, 8, 9, 9)	Argentine tango	"Bat Out of Hell" — Meat Loaf	Safe

=== Week 6 ===
Musical guest: Bryan Ferry — "You Can Dance"

Couples are listed in the order they performed.

Couple	Scores	Dance	Music	Result
Kara & Artem	36 (9, 9, 9, 9)	Salsa	"Conga" — Gloria Estefan	Safe
Pamela & James	33 (8, 9, 8, 8)	Foxtrot	"Let There Be Love" — Nat King Cole	Safe
Felicity & Vincent	29 (6, 8, 7, 8)	Paso doble	"Habanera" — Georges Bizet	Safe
Jimi & Flavia	32 (7, 8, 8, 9)	Quickstep	"Mr. Pinstripe Suit" — Big Bad Voodoo Daddy	Eliminated
Matt & Aliona	35 (8, 9, 9, 9)	Viennese waltz	"Where the Wild Roses Grow" — Nick Cave & Kylie Minogue	Safe
Ann & Anton	17 (2, 6, 5, 4)	Charleston	"Let's Do It, Let's Fall in Love" — Ella Fitzgerald	Safe
Michelle & Brendan	30 (6, 8, 8, 8)	Waltz	"Right Here Waiting" — Richard Marx	Bottom two
Patsy & Robin	29 (6, 8, 7, 8)	Cha-cha-cha	"All the Lovers" — Kylie Minogue	Safe
Scott & Natalie	28 (4, 9, 7, 8)	Rumba	"Wishing on a Star" — Rose Royce	Safe
Gavin & Katya	29 (5, 8, 8, 8)	Cha-cha-cha	"Don't Cha" — Pussycat Dolls	Safe

=== Week 7 ===
Musical guests:

- Annie Lennox — "Universal Child"
- Alesha Dixon — "Radio"

Couples are listed in the order they performed.

Couple	Scores	Dance	Music	Result
Pamela & James	32 (8, 8, 8, 8)	Cha-cha-cha	"Money (That's What I Want)" — The Flying Lizards	Safe
Michelle & Brendan	24 (4, 7, 7, 6)	Paso doble	"American Woman" — The Guess Who	Eliminated
Patsy & Robin	32 (7, 9, 8, 8)	Viennese waltz	"Anyone Who Had a Heart" — Dionne Warwick	Safe
Gavin & Katya	33 (7, 8, 9, 9)	Quickstep	"I Want You to Want Me" — Cheap Trick	Safe
Ann & Anton	20 (3, 6, 6, 5)	Foxtrot	"You Make Me Feel So Young" — Frank Sinatra	Safe
Kara & Artem	38 (9, 9, 10, 10)	Argentine tango	"Los Vino" — Otros Aires	Safe
Felicity & Vincent	26 (5, 7, 7, 7)	Salsa	"All Night Long (All Night)" — Lionel Richie	Bottom two
Matt & Aliona	35 (8, 9, 9, 9)	Rumba	"Too Lost in You" — Sugababes	Safe
Scott & Natalie	39 (9, 10, 10, 10)	Jive	"Hit the Road Jack" — Ray Charles	Safe

=== Week 8: Blackpool Week ===
Musical guests:

- Viva Elvis — "Blue Suede Shoes"
- Duffy — "Well, Well, Well"

This week's episode was staged in the Tower Ballroom at the Blackpool Tower in Blackpool, Lancashire. Couples performed either the American Smooth or the samba, and are listed in the order they performed.

Couple	Scores	Dance	Music	Result
Patsy & Robin	28 (6, 7, 8, 7)	Samba	"Copacabana" — Barry Manilow	Bottom two
Kara & Artem	35 (9, 6, 10, 10)	American Smooth	"Cry Me a River" — Michael Bublé	Safe
Matt & Aliona	38 (9, 9, 10, 10)	Samba	"Young Hearts Run Free" — Candi Staton	Safe
Felicity & Vincent	30 (7, 7, 8, 8)	American Smooth	"Me and My Shadow" — Frank Sinatra & Sammy Davis Jr	Eliminated
Gavin & Katya	27 (4, 7, 8, 8)	American Smooth	"She's a Lady" — Tom Jones	Safe
Scott & Natalie	32 (6, 8, 9, 9)	Samba	"(Your Love Keeps Lifting Me) Higher and Higher" — Jackie Wilson	Safe
Pamela & James	37 (8, 9, 10, 10)	American Smooth	"Perhaps, Perhaps, Perhaps" — Doris Day	Safe
Ann & Anton	13 (1, 5, 4, 3)	Samba	"Heaven Must Be Missing an Angel" — Tavares	Safe

=== Week 9 ===
Musical guest: James Blunt — "So Far Gone"

Couples are listed in the order they performed.

Couple	Scores	Dance	Music	Result
Kara & Artem	34 (7, 9, 9, 9)	Jive	"Runaround Sue" — Dion	Safe
Ann & Anton	14 (1, 5, 5, 3)	Rumba	"My Heart Will Go On" — Celine Dion	Safe
Patsy & Robin	30 (7, 8, 8, 7)	Argentine tango	"They" — Jem	Eliminated
Scott & Natalie	31 (6, 7, 9, 9)	American Smooth	"Fly Me to the Moon" — Frank Sinatra	Safe
Gavin & Katya	22 (3, 6, 7, 6)	Jive	"Hey Ya!" — Outkast	Bottom two
Matt & Aliona	33 (8, 8, 8, 9)	American Smooth	"Empire State of Mind (Part II) Broken Down" — Alicia Keys	Safe
Pamela & James	38 (9, 9, 10, 10)	Charleston	"Let's Misbehave" — Easy Virtue Orchestra	Safe

=== Week 10: Movie Night (Quarter-final) ===
Musical guest: Manic Street Preachers – "Some Kind of Nothingness"

Couples are listed in the order they performed.

Couple	Scores	Dance	Music	Film	Result
Scott & Natalie	35 (8, 9, 9, 9)	Paso doble	"James Bond Theme"	Dr. No	Bottom two
Ann & Anton	14 (2, 5, 4, 3)	American Smooth	"Hello, Dolly!"	Hello, Dolly!	Eliminated
Matt & Aliona	35 (8, 9, 9, 9)	Jive	"Soul Bossa Nova"	Austin Powers: International Man of Mystery	Safe
Pamela & James	40 (10, 10, 10, 10)	Viennese waltz	"Unchained Melody"	Ghost	Safe
Gavin & Katya	33 (7, 9, 9, 8)	Foxtrot	"Minnie the Moocher"	The Blues Brothers	Safe
Kara & Artem	38 (9, 9, 10, 10)	Tango	"El Tango de Roxanne"	Moulin Rouge!	Safe

=== Week 11: Semi-final ===
On the first night, each couple performed one routine and then all couples participated in a swing dance marathon for additional points. On the second night, each couple performed one additional routine. Couples are listed in the order they performed.

Night 1

Couple	Scores	Dance	Music
Pamela & James	35 (8, 9, 9, 9)	Paso doble	"Bad Romance" — Lady Gaga
Kara & Artem	39 (9, 10, 10, 10)	Viennese waltz	"Stop!" — Sam Brown
Gavin & Katya	27 (6, 7, 7, 7)	Samba	"Bamboleo" — Gipsy Kings
Scott & Natalie	33 (8, 8, 8, 9)	Argentine tango	"Época" — Gotan Project
Matt & Aliona	28 (7, 7, 7, 7)	Salsa	"Spinning Around" — Kylie Minogue
Gavin & Katya	1	Swing-a-thon (Swing Marathon)	"In the Mood" — Glenn Miller
Scott & Natalie	2	Swing-a-thon (Swing Marathon)	"In the Mood" — Glenn Miller
Pamela & James	3	Swing-a-thon (Swing Marathon)	"In the Mood" — Glenn Miller
Matt & Aliona	4	Swing-a-thon (Swing Marathon)	"In the Mood" — Glenn Miller
Kara & Artem	5	Swing-a-thon (Swing Marathon)	"In the Mood" — Glenn Miller

Night 2

Musical guests:

- Take That — "The Flood" & "Back For Good"
- Bruce Forsyth & Lance Ellington — "The Three Little Bears"

Couple	Scores	Dance	Music	Result
Scott & Natalie	35 (8, 9, 9, 9)	Charleston	"Anything Goes" — Cole Porter	Eliminated
Kara & Artem	39 (9, 10, 10, 10)	Rumba	"Samba Pa Ti" — Carlos Santana	Safe
Matt & Aliona	38 (9, 10, 10, 9)	Tango	"Hung Up" — Madonna	Safe
Gavin & Katya	31 (6, 9, 8, 8)	Viennese waltz	"You Know Me" — Robbie Williams	Eliminated
Pamela & James	40 (10, 10, 10, 10)	Quickstep	"Steppin' Out with My Baby" — Fred Astaire	Safe

=== Week 12: Final ===
Musical guest: Paloma Faith – "Upside Down"

During the first show, each couple performed two routines, one of which was their showdance routine, and the other of which was a reprise of their highest-scoring dance from the series. At the end of the first show, the couple was the lowest combined scores was eliminated. During the second show, each couple performed two additional routines, one of which was their favourite dance of the series. Couples are listed in the order they performed.

Show 1

Couple	Scores	Dance	Music	Result
Matt & Aliona	38 (9, 9, 10, 10)	Samba	"Young Hearts Run Free" — Candi Staton	Safe
Matt & Aliona	34 (7, 9, 9, 9)	Showdance	"I Like The Way (You Move)" — BodyRockers	Safe
Kara & Artem	39 (9, 10, 10, 10)	Rumba	"Samba Pa Ti" — Carlos Santana	Safe
Kara & Artem	36 (9, 9, 9, 9)	Showdance	"Don't Stop Me Now" — Queen	Safe
Pamela & James	40 (10, 10, 10, 10)	Viennese waltz	"Unchained Melody" — The Righteous Brothers	Third place
Pamela & James	37 (9, 9, 9, 10)	Showdance	"(I've Had) The Time of My Life" — from Dirty Dancing	Third place

Show 2

Couple	Scores	Dance	Music	Result
Matt & Aliona	35 (9, 8, 9, 9)	Paso doble	"Don't Let Me Be Misunderstood" — The Animals	Runners-up
Matt & Aliona	37 (9, 9, 10, 9)	Viennese waltz	"Where the Wild Roses Grow" — Nick Cave & Kylie Minogue	Runners-up
Kara & Artem	38 (9, 9, 10, 10)	Waltz	"If You Don't Know Me By Now" — Simply Red	Winners
Kara & Artem	37 (10, 7, 10, 10)	American Smooth	"Cry Me a River" — Michael Bublé	Winners

== Dance chart ==
The couples performed the following each week:

- Week 1: One unlearned dance (cha-cha-cha or waltz)
- Week 2: One unlearned dance (foxtrot or salsa)
- Week 3: One unlearned dance (quickstep or rumba)
- Week 4: One unlearned dance (Charleston or tango)
- Weeks 5–7: One unlearned dance
- Week 8: One unlearned dance (American Smooth or samba)
- Weeks 9–10: One unlearned dance
- Week 11 (Night 1): One unlearned dance & swing dance marathon
- Week 11 (Night 2): One unlearned dance
- Week 12 (Show 1): Highest-scoring dance of the series & showdance
- Week 12 (Show 2): One unlearned dance & favourite dance of the series

Strictly Come Dancing (series 8) - Dance chart
Couple	Week																
Couple	1	2	3	4	5	6	7	8	9	10	11			12			
Kara & Artem	Cha-cha-cha	Foxtrot	Quickstep	Charleston	Paso doble	Salsa	Argentine tango	American Smooth	Jive	Tango	Viennese waltz	Swing; Marathon	Rumba	Rumba	Showdance	Waltz	American Smooth
Matt & Aliona	Cha-cha-cha	Foxtrot	Quickstep	Charleston	Argentine tango	Viennese waltz	Rumba	Samba	American Smooth	Jive	Salsa	Swing; Marathon	Tango	Samba	Showdance	Paso doble	Viennese waltz
Pamela & James	Waltz	Salsa	Rumba	Tango	Jive	Foxtrot	Cha-cha-cha	American Smooth	Charleston	Viennese waltz	Paso doble	Swing; Marathon	Quickstep	Viennese waltz	Showdance		
Scott & Natalie	Waltz	Salsa	Quickstep	Tango	Viennese waltz	Rumba	Jive	Samba	American Smooth	Paso doble	Argentine tango	Swing; Marathon	Charleston				
Gavin & Katya	Waltz	Salsa	Rumba	Tango	Paso doble	Cha-cha-cha	Quickstep	American Smooth	Jive	Foxtrot	Samba	Swing; Marathon	Viennese waltz				
Ann & Anton	Waltz	Salsa	Quickstep	Tango	Paso doble	Charleston	Foxtrot	Samba	Rumba	American Smooth							
Patsy & Robin	Waltz	Salsa	Quickstep	Charleston	Jive	Cha-cha-cha	Viennese waltz	Samba	Argentine tango								
Felicity & Vincent	Cha-cha-cha	Foxtrot	Rumba	Tango	Viennese waltz	Paso doble	Salsa	American Smooth									
Michelle & Brendan	Cha-cha-cha	Foxtrot	Rumba	Tango	Jive	Waltz	Paso doble										
Jimi & Flavia	Cha-cha-cha	Foxtrot	Rumba	Charleston	Paso doble	Quickstep											
Tina & Jared	Cha-cha-cha	Foxtrot		Charleston	Argentine tango												
Peter & Erin	Waltz	Salsa	Quickstep	Charleston													
Paul & Ola	Cha-cha-cha	Foxtrot	Rumba														
Goldie & Kristina	Cha-cha-cha	Foxtrot															

== Ratings ==
Weekly ratings for each show on BBC One. All ratings are provided by BARB.

Episode	Date	Official rating (millions)	Weekly rank for BBC One	Weekly rank for all UK TV	Share
Launch show	11 September	7.46	6	12	37.5%
Week 1 (Night 1)	1 October	9.60	2	6	38.2%
Week 1 (Night 2)	2 October	9.36	3	8	41.6%
Week 2	9 October	9.43	3	7	42.1%
Week 2 results	10 October	9.27	4	8	36.0%
Week 3	16 October	9.64	3	5	41.2%
Week 3 results	17 October	9.30	4	10	35.1%
Week 4	23 October	10.06	2	4	42.3%
Week 4 results	24 October	9.92	3	5	36.9%
Week 5	30 October	10.88	1	3	43.8%
Week 5 results	31 October	10.12	2	4	38.8%
Week 6	6 November	11.12	1	3	44.0%
Week 6 results	7 November	10.65	2	4	36.6%
Week 7	13 November	11.74	1	4	44.2%
Week 7 results	14 November	11.07	2	7	36.3%
Week 8	20 November	12.28	1	3	45.3%
Week 8 results	21 November	11.69	2	4	39.2%
Week 9	27 November	12.43	1	3	43.3%
Week 9 results	28 November	11.94	2	4	40.5%
Week 10	4 December	13.03	1	3	45.0%
Week 10 results	5 December	12.04	2	5	40.1%
Week 11 (Night 1)	10 December	9.60	5	14	33.4%
Week 11 (Night 2)	11 December	11.57	2	11	43.1%
Week 11 results	12 December	12.04	1	9	41.1%
Week 12	18 December	13.72	2	2	45.8%
Week 12 results	18 December	14.28	1	1	47.6%
Series average (excl. launch show)	2010	11.07	—N/a	—N/a	40.9%
