= Robin Windsor =

British dancer (1979–2024)

- Born: Robin Jamie Windsor; 15 September 1979; Ipswich, Suffolk, England
- Died: 19 February 2024 (aged 44); Hammersmith, Greater London, England
- Occupations: Professional dancer; choreographer
- Television: Strictly Come Dancing (2010–2013)
- Partner: Marcus Collins (2013–2015)

Robin Jamie Windsor (15 September 1979 – 19 February 2024) was an English professional Latin and ballroom dancer, best known for appearing as a professional dancer on the BBC television series Strictly Come Dancing.

== Early life ==
Robin Jamie Windsor was born on 15 September 1979 in Ipswich, Suffolk, and grew up in the Spring Road area. He attended Clifford Road Primary and Copleston High School. He began dancing at the age of three, when his parents took him to the Ipswich School of Dancing. At the age of 19 Windsor moved to London to pursue his career as a dancer.

== Career ==
=== Competitive career ===
Windsor's interest in dance was initiated by his parents when they enrolled him at the age of three in a local dance school in Ipswich. From the beginning, he studied both Latin and Ballroom dance, eventually competing in those disciplines at the highest levels. His skills eventually led him to represent England, amassing numerous World Championships, both on the domestic and international level. Windsor competed successfully in the juvenile and junior ballroom dancer categories. He represented England in the World Championships.

=== Professional partnership ===
In 2010, in Windsor's first season with Strictly Come Dancing, Kristina Rihanoff became his professional partner. They performed solo routines on the show and also took their partnership off the Strictly dance floor, both headlining Burn the Floor in London's West End in 2013. The partnership took them all over the world, including charity events and Strictly cruise ship performances. They performed in the South African version of Strictly Come Dancing and taught large groups at this special event.

=== Dance shows ===
Summer 2015 saw Windsor and Rihanoff in a touring production of Puttin' On the Ritz, featuring the most famous song and dance moments of the last 50 years of the golden age of Hollywood, recreated live on stage. Puttin on the Ritz involved song and dance and featured music from George Gershwin, Irving Berlin, Cole Porter and others, with a cast of award-winning singers and dancers.

Windsor and Rihanoff also took part in dance weekends around the county.

=== Dance lessons ===
Windsor started his own branded dance lessons with "Beginners Ballroom" in March 2015 with a music hall feel at Cecil Sharp House in London and same sex ballroom lessons in a music hall setting, starting at Wilton's Music Hall in Shadwell, London, in April 2015.

=== Theatre ===
From 2003 to summer 2010, Windsor was part of the cast of Burn the Floor, one of the leading ballroom-based shows in the world. Two tours with Burn the Floor (2003, 2004) and three with FloorPlay (2006 to 2008) took him several times around the world, leading up to the highlights being a stint on Broadway (2009) and in the London West End (2010). In Windsor's last season with Burn the Floor in London, he was engaged in the role of Swing having to learn all male dancers' parts, to step in for anyone who was unable to perform. From Broadway, Windsor's abilities took him to Dancing with the Stars Australia and So You Think You Can Dance in Holland. He was also asked to assist in the choreography for the Australian version of So You Think You Can Dance.

In 2012, Windsor starred in Dance To The Music Tour along with his professional partner Kristina Rihanoff, fellow pro-dancers from Strictly Come Dancing, Artem Chigvintsev and Kara Tointon, who won the competition in 2010. With music from the Strictly Come Dancing Band, the show toured the UK.

From 6 March to 30 June 2013, Windsor – along with his professional partner Rihanoff – returned to headline Burn the Floor, at the Shaftesbury Theatre in London's West End. In 2022, Windsor returned to Burn the Floor for their UK reunion tour.

== Charity ==
Together with fellow SCD dancer Artem Chigvintsev, Windsor posed for the Cosmopolitan December 2010 centrefold, raising awareness for male cancer. In January 2011 he took part in the Greater Manchester Police's campaign against domestic violence, together with the cast of the SCD Tour 2011.

Windsor supported the Stonewall campaigning for gay, lesbian and bisexual equality and supported the Mad Trust with its West End Bares charity event seeing the theatre community coming together to raise money for HIV charities. Windsor hosted the auction in 2013 ending up completely naked on stage.

== Strictly Come Dancing ==
Windsor appeared on the BBC One show Strictly Come Dancing from 2010 until 2013, partnering with Patsy Kensit, Anita Dobson, Lisa Riley and Deborah Meaden.

=== Highest and lowest scoring performances per dance ===
Highest and lowest scoring performances per dance
Dance	Partner	Highest	Partner	Lowest
American Smooth	Anita Dobson; Lisa Riley	32	–	–
Argentine Tango	Anita Dobson	33	Patsy Kensit	30
Cha Cha Cha	Anita Dobson; Lisa Riley	30	Deborah Meaden	24
Charleston	Anita Dobson	31	Lisa Riley	26
Foxtrot	Lisa Riley	32	–	–
Jive	Patsy Kensit	31	Deborah Meaden	23
Quickstep	Lisa Riley	31	Patsy Kensit	24
Rumba	Lisa Riley	27	–	–
Salsa	Lisa Riley	31	Anita Dobson; Patsy Kensit	28
Samba	Lisa Riley	32	Anita Dobson	27
Swing-a-thon	Anita Dobson	2	–	–
Tango	Anita Dobson	31	Deborah Meaden	24
Viennese Waltz	Patsy Kensit	32	Lisa Riley	25
Waltz	Anita Dobson	28	Patsy Kensit	22

Series	Partner	Place	Average Score
8	Patsy Kensit	7th	28.0
9	Anita Dobson	7th	29.7
10	Lisa Riley	5th	29.3
11	Deborah Meaden	12th	25.2

=== Series 8 ===
In September 2010, Windsor joined the BBC's Strictly Come Dancing as one of the three new male professional dancers. For his first year Robin was partnered with actress Patsy Kensit. Robin's professional partner was Kristina Rihanoff. Both performed for many celebrities including Neil Diamond, Alice Cooper, Rod Stewart and Katherine Jenkins. His first series (Series 8), with his Celebrity partner Patsy Kensit, he reached seventh place.

Week #	Dance/song	Judges' scores					Result
Week #	Dance/song	Horwood	Goodman	Dixon	Tonioli	Total	Result
1	Waltz / "When I Need You"	4	6	6	6	22	N/A
2	Salsa / "Canned Heat"	7	7	7	7	28	Safe
3	Quickstep / "Black Horse and the Cherry Tree"	5	6	7	6	24	Safe
4	Charleston / "Hot Honey Rag"	6	8	7	7	28	Safe
5	Jive / "Monster Mash"	7	8	8	8	31	Safe
6	Cha-Cha-Cha / "All the Lovers"	6	8	7	8	29	Safe
7	Viennese Waltz / "Anyone Who Had a Heart"	7	9	8	8	32	Safe
8	Samba / "Copacabana"	6	7	8	7	28	Bottom Two
9	Argentine Tango / "They"	7	8	8	7	30	Eliminated

On 17 December 2010, Windsor won the Grand Piano Pro Challenge on Strictly Come Dancing's sister programme It Takes Two with 3548 points in front of Brendan Cole (1907) and Natalie Lowe (1091).

Windsor and Kensit also took part in the Strictly Come Dancing pro/celeb tour in January and February 2011, dancing the Salsa and the Viennese Waltz, reaching respectable scores of between 60 and 53 out of 60 (including a few 10s for their Viennese Waltz towards the end of the tour).

=== Series 9 ===
On 15 June 2011, the BBC announced that Windsor would again be competing in the 2011 series of Strictly Come Dancing. In the launch show on 10 September 2011, Windsor was paired with actress Anita Dobson, with the couple being named "Team Dobbin" by Robin Windsor on Twitter. They were eliminated on 27 November 2011 after Windsor had been unable to dance for a week due to an injury. Dobson therefore rehearsed and danced the Cha Cha Cha and the Swingathon with Brendan Cole. Windsor also won this year's Children in need special and was partnered with BBC Breakfast's Susanna Reid.

Week #	Dance/song	Judges' scores					Result
Week #	Dance/song	Horwood	Goodman	Dixon	Tonioli	Total	Result
1	Waltz / "Three Times a Lady"	7	7	7	7	28	N/A
2	Salsa / "Jump in the Line (Shake, Senora)"	7	7	7	7	28	Safe
3	Jive / "You Can't Stop the Beat"	6	7	7	7	27	Safe
4	American Smooth / "I've Got You Under My Skin"	8	8	8	8	32	Safe
5	Tango / "Devil Woman"	7	8	8	8	31	Safe
6	Charleston / "I Got Rhythm"	7	8*	8	8	31	Safe
7	Argentine Tango / "Tango"	7	9	8	9	33	Bottom Two
8	Samba / "Come on Eileen"	6	7	7	7	27	Safe
9*	Cha Cha Cha / "Uptown Girl"	7	8	7	8	30	Eliminated
9*	Swing Marathon / "Chattanooga Choo Choo"	Awarded 2 extra points					Eliminated

- In Week 6, Jennifer Grey guest judged for Goodman.
- In Week 9, Windsor didn't dance with Dobson due to an injury, and was replaced by Brendan Cole.

=== Series 10 ===
In June 2012, it was announced that Windsor would return to be a professional dancer for the third time. This time, he was paired with actress and presenter Lisa Riley. Windsor enjoyed his most successful series of Strictly Come Dancing to date when he reached the semi-final dancing with Riley. The pair were the people's favourite and wowed audiences in the UK as part of the Strictly Come Dancing live tour in 2013.

Week #	Dance/song	Judges' scores					Result
Week #	Dance/song	Horwood	Bussell	Goodman	Tonioli	Total	Result
1	Cha-Cha-Cha / "Think"	8	8	7	7	30	N/A
2	Viennese Waltz / "Never Tear Us Apart"	7	6	6	6	25	Safe
3	Jive / "Hanky Panky"	8	6	7	8	29	Safe
4	Charleston / "Witch Doctor"	6	6	7	7	26	Safe
5	Tango / "Let's Stick Together"	7	7	6	7	27	Safe
6	Foxtrot / "This Will Be (An Everlasting Love)"	8	8	8	8	32	Safe
7	Samba / "Car Wash"	8	8	8	8	32	Safe
8	Rumba / "As If We Never Said Goodbye"	7	6	7	7	27	Safe
9	Quickstep / "Bring Me Sunshine"	7	8	8	8	31	Safe
10	Cha Cha Cha & Tango Fusion / "Voulez-Vous"	7	8	7	8	30	Safe
11	American Smooth / "All That Jazz"; Salsa / "Best Years of Our Lives"	8; 7	8; 8	8; 8	8; 8	32; 31	Eliminated

=== Series 11 ===
In June 2013, Windsor confirmed his return as one of the male professional dancers for the eleventh series of the show. His celebrity partner was Dragon's Den panellist, businesswoman and entrepreneur Deborah Meaden. The couple were eliminated in week 5. The pair went on to compete in the Strictly Come Dancing live tour.

Week #	Dance/song	Judges' scores					Result
Week #	Dance/song	Horwood	Bussell	Goodman	Tonioli	Total	Result
1	Tango / "Money, Money, Money"	6	6	6	6	24	N/A
2	Cha-Cha-Cha / "Respect"	5	7	6	6	24	Safe
3	Quickstep / "(Your Love Keeps Lifting Me) Higher and Higher"	7	7	7	7	28	Safe
4	Jive / "Making Your Mind Up"	5	6	6	6	23	Safe
5	Viennese Waltz / "It's a Man's Man's Man's World"	6	7	7	7	27	Eliminated

=== Series 12 ===
Windsor was unable to perform in Series 12 due to a back injury, and was replaced by Trent Whiddon. He returned to the show in week nine, on 23 November 2014, in the opening professional sequence, as a policeman, dancing to "Rock This Town" by the Stray Cats.

=== Christmas Specials ===
(Scores in brackets are judges' individual scores in this order: Revel Horwood, Bussell, Goodman, Tonioli)

Windsor competed in three Strictly Christmas Specials:

- 2013: Windsor partnered TV and radio presenter Sara Cox they won 33 points for their waltz to "Silent Night" (7, 8, 9, 9)
- 2014: he partnered one of his most popular partners Lisa Riley and danced a jive to "Step into Christmas", earning 32 points (8, 8, 8, 8)
- 2015: he partnered Series 12 contestant Alison Hammond. They danced a cha cha cha to "Celebration" and scored 31 (7, 8, 8, 8)

== Personal life ==
Windsor lived in London with his partner Davide Cini, to whom he announced his engagement on 21 August 2013. The relationship ended shortly after, and in February 2014, it was confirmed that he was in a relationship with The X Factor runner-up Marcus Collins. The couple split up in February 2015, after 18 months together.

== Death ==
Windsor was found dead in his hotel room at The Hoxton in Shepherd's Bush, London on 19 February 2024, aged 44. An inquest into his death two years later confirmed he had died by suicide. He left two notes, in one of which he expressed how being dropped as a professional from Strictly Come Dancing had "destroyed him". His former dance partner Kristina Rihanoff said in a tribute to him that it was "an absolute tragedy he felt there was no way out".

His former employers Burn the Floor and Strictly Come Dancing paid tribute to Windsor, the latter describing him as "an exceptionally talented dancer and choreographer [...] as well as a considerate and kind person both on and off the dancefloor". Lisa Riley and Deborah Meaden, who had been partnered with Windsor on the show, also paid tribute, with the latter describing him as "kind and incredibly generous", adding "he lit up a room with his fun and energy and certainly his sparkle ... he was never happier than when he was covered in crystals!".

Windsor's funeral was held on 26 March 2024 in his hometown of Ipswich. On 14 September 2024, the first episode of the 22nd series of Strictly Come Dancing was dedicated to the memory of both Windsor and former contestant Dave Myers, who died a week later.
