= Elaine Dennison =

British New Zealand rheumatologist

Academic background
- Education: University of Cambridge, University of Southampton
- Thesis: Infant growth and bone loss in later life: a prospective study (1999)

Elaine Margaret Dennison is a British epidemiologist and rheumatologist, and is Professor of Clinical Research at Victoria University of Wellington, and Professor of Musculoskeletal Epidemiology and Honorary Consultant in Rheumatology within Medicine at the University of Southampton. Dennison specialises in musculoskeletal ageing, and she is particularly interested in how early life impacts on conditions such as osteoarthritis and osteoporosis later in life.

== Academic career ==
Dennison trained in medicine at the University of Cambridge, and then completed a PhD titled Infant growth and bone loss in later life: a prospective study at the MRC Unit of the University of Southampton in 1999. Dennison then undertook postdoctoral research at Southampton, and became a principal investigator on the Hertfordshire Cohort Study. She is Professor of Musculoskeletal Epidemiology and Honorary Consultant in Rheumatology within Medicine at Southampton. In 2011 Dennison joined the faculty of Victoria University of Wellington in 2011, being appointed as Professor of Clinical Research, and splits her time between the two countries.

Dennison has served as Chair of the UK's National Osteoporosis Society Grants Committee, and is a scientific advisor to the International Osteoporosis Foundation Committee. She has chaired the British Society of Rheumatology Biologics Register Steering Committee. Dennison sits on a number of journal editorial boards, including Osteoporosis International, Calcified Tissue International, Aging Clinical Experimental Research and the Journal of Developmental Health and Adult Disease.

Dennison's research is focused on musculoskeletal ageing, and she is particularly interested in how early life impacts on conditions such as osteoarthritis and osteoporosis later in life.

== Honours and awards ==
Dennison was awarded the British Society of Rheumatology's Michael Mason Prize in 2014. In 2016 Dennison was awarded the International Osteoporosis Foundation's Pierre Meunier award which recognises "the contribution to the field of musculoskeletal diseases of young scientists who have shown their ability to perform top-quality research and are expected to become key opinion leaders in the coming years".

In 2022 Dennison was awarded the Olof Johnell Science Award by the International Osteoporosis Foundation. The award is presented to "individuals who have made outstanding contributions to the field of osteoporosis in a scientific or policy implementation area worldwide".

== Selected works ==
- Cristen J. Willer; Elizabeth K Speliotes; Loos, Ruth; et al. (2009). "Six new loci associated with body mass index highlight a neuronal influence on body weight regulation". Nature Genetics. 41 (1): 25–34. doi:10.1038/ng.287. PMC 2695662. PMID 19079261. Wikidata Q24646434.
- Wang, Thomas J; Zhang, Feng; Richards, J Brent; Kestenbaum, Bryan; van Meurs, Joyce B; Berry, Diane; Kiel, Douglas P; Streeten, Elizabeth A; Ohlsson, Claes; Koller, Daniel L; Peltonen, Leena; Cooper, Jason D; O'Reilly, Paul F; Houston, Denise K; Glazer, Nicole L; Vandenput, Liesbeth; Peacock, Munro; Shi, Julia; Rivadeneira, Fernando; McCarthy, Mark I; Anneli, Pouta; de Boer, Ian H; Mangino, Massimo; Kato, Bernet; Smyth, Deborah J; Booth, Sarah L; Jacques, Paul F; Burke, Greg L; Goodarzi, Mark; Cheung, Ching-Lung; Wolf, Myles; Rice, Kenneth; Goltzman, David; Hidiroglou, Nick; Ladouceur, Martin; Wareham, Nicholas J; Hocking, Lynne J; Hart, Deborah; Arden, Nigel K; Cooper, Cyrus; Malik, Suneil; Fraser, William D; Hartikainen, Anna-Liisa; Zhai, Guangju; Macdonald, Helen M; Forouhi, Nita G; Loos, Ruth J F; Reid, David M; Hakim, Alan; Dennison, Elaine; Liu, Yongmei; Power, Chris; Stevens, Helen E; Jaana, Laitinen; Vasan, Ramachandran S; Soranzo, Nicole; Bojunga, Jörg; Psaty, Bruce M; Lorentzon, Mattias; Foroud, Tatiana; Harris, Tamara B; Hofman, Albert; Jansson, John-Olov; Cauley, Jane A; Uitterlinden, Andre G; Gibson, Quince; Järvelin, Marjo-Riitta; Karasik, David; Siscovick, David S; Econs, Michael J; Kritchevsky, Stephen B; Florez, Jose C; Todd, John A; Dupuis, Josee; Hyppönen, Elina; Spector, Timothy D (2010). "Common genetic determinants of vitamin D insufficiency: a genome-wide association study". The Lancet. 376 (9736): 180–8. doi:10.1016/s0140-6736(10)60588-0. PMC 3086761. PMID 20541252. Wikidata Q24602058.
- Estrada, Karol; Unnur Styrkarsdottir; Evangelou, Evangelos; et al. (2012). "Genome-wide meta-analysis identifies 56 bone mineral density loci and reveals 14 loci associated with risk of fracture". Nature Genetics. 44 (5): 491–501. doi:10.1038/ng.2249. PMC 3338864. PMID 22504420. Wikidata Q34268288.
- Van Staa, Tjeerd; Dennison, Elaine Margaret; H G Leufkens; Cooper, Cyrus (2001). "Epidemiology of fractures in England and Wales". Bone. 29 (6): 517–522. doi:10.1016/s8756-3282(01)00614-7. PMID 11728921. Wikidata Q57086774.
- Javaid, Muhammad; S R Crozier; N C Harvey; C R Gale; Dennison, Elaine Margaret; B J Boucher; N K Arden; K M Godfrey; Cooper, Cyrus; Princess Anne Hospital Study Group (2006). "Maternal vitamin D status during pregnancy and childhood bone mass at age 9 years: a longitudinal study". The Lancet. 367 (9504): 36–43. doi:10.1016/s0140-6736(06)67922-1. PMID 16399151. Wikidata Q34482467.
- Emmanouela Repapi; Sayers, Ian; Wain, Louise; et al. (2010). "Genome-wide association study identifies five loci associated with lung function". Nature Genetics. 42 (1): 36–44. doi:10.1038/ng.501. PMC 2862965. PMID 20010834. Wikidata Q24629653.
