= Jacobaeus Prize =

Prize for medical research

The Jacobaeus Prize, (also known as the "Jacobæus Prize") is regarded as a prestigious recognition within the field of medical research. It is an annual award given to individuals who have made significant contributions to the advancement of medical science, particularly in the areas of physiology or endocrinology.

== Background ==
Named after Hans Christian Jacobæus, a pioneering Swedish physician and researcher known for his contributions to the development of laparoscopy and thoracoscopy, the prize aims to honor those who continue to push the boundaries of medical research.

The prize was established to commemorate the legacy of Hans Christian Jacobæus, whose innovative work in the early 20th century laid the groundwork for minimally invasive surgery techniques. The award is sponsored by the Novo Nordisk Foundation.

== Recipients ==
List of recipients of The Jacobæus Prize over the years:

- 2024 - Hannele Yki-Järvinen

Year	Recipient
2023	Sir David Lane
2022	Zhen Yan, Professor
2021	Stafford Lightman, Professor
2020	Karine Clement, Professor
2019	Mark Atkinson, Professor
2018	Sundeep Khosla, Professor
2017	Jeffrey Gorden, Professor
2016	Mark McCarthy, Professor
2015	M. Bishr Omary, Professor
2014	Frances Ashcroft, Professor
2013	Lewis C. Cantley, Professor
2012	Anthony Weetman, Professor
2011	Johan Auwerx, Professor
2010	Gerard Karsenty, Professor
2009	Michael P. Czech, Professor
2008	Emmanuel Van Obberghen, Professor
2007	Kári Stefánsson, Professor
2006	Björn R. Olsen, Professor
2005	Barbara B. Kahn, Professor
2005	Stephen O'rahilly, Professor
2004	Bruce M. Spiegelman, Professor
2003	Sir Philip Cohen, Professor
2002	Dr. C. Ronald Kahn
2001	Masashi Yanagisawa, Professor
2001	Emmanuel Mignot, Professor
2001	J. Gregor Sutcliffe, Professor
1999	E. Rothman
1998	Erkki Ruoslahti, Dr.
1997	Jeff Friedman, Professor
1995	Theodore Friedmann, Professor
1994	Ole Holger Petersen, Professor
1993	Per A. Peterson, Professor
1991	Rolf Luft, Professor
1990	Allen M. Spiegel, Professor
1989	Leslie J. Degroot, Professor
1988	Morton K. Schwartz, Dr.
1987	Abner Notkins, Professor
1986	J. Denis Mcgarry, Professor
1985	Jacob E. Poulsen, Dr.med
