= Minkowski Prize =

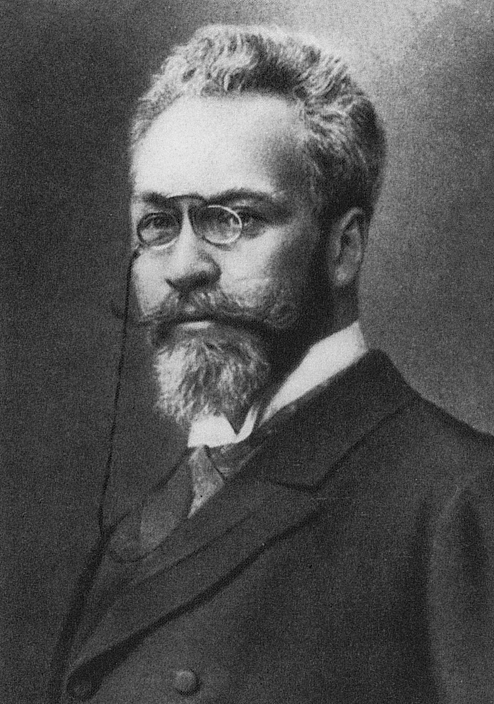
- Oskar Minkowski
- Awarded for: Prize awarded for research contributing to the advancement of knowledge concerning diabetes mellitus
- Sponsored by: European Association for the Study of Diabetes
- Website: https://www.easd.org/prizes/minkowski.html

The Minkowski Prize is given by the European Association for the Study of Diabetes (EASD) in recognition to research which has been carried out by a person normally residing in Europe, as manifested by publications which contribute to the advancement of knowledge concerning diabetes mellitus. The Prize honors the name of Oskar Minkowski (1858–1931), a physician and physiologist who was the discoverer of the role of pancreas in the control of glucose metabolism. It has been awarded annually since 1966, and the winner is invited to pronounce a Minkowski Lecture during the EASD Annual Conference. It is traditionally seen as the most prestigious European prize in the field of diabetes research.

Since 1966, the award is sponsored by a pharmaceutical company Sanofi-Aventis. The prize consists of a certificate and 20,000 euros plus travel expenses. The candidate must be less than 45 years of age on 1 January of the year of award. Self-nomination is possible.

== Winners ==
With the city where the prize was awarded (Annual Conference), name and country.

- 1966 Aarhus – Philip Randle (United Kingdom)
- 1967 Stockholm – E. R. Froesch (Switzerland)
- 1968 Louvain – Lars Carlson (Sweden)
- 1969 Montpellier – Bo Hellman (Sweden)
- 1970 Warsaw – Bernard Jeanrenaud (Switzerland)
- 1971 Southampton – Charles Nicholas Hales (United Kingdom)
- 1972 Madrid – Willy J. Malaisse (Belgium)
- 1973 Brussels – Lelio Orci (Switzerland)
- 1974 Jerusalem – Erol Cerasi (Sweden)
- 1975 Munich – Pierre Freychet (France)
- 1976 Helsinki – Karl Dietrich Hepp (Germany)
- 1977 Geneva – John Wahren (Sweden)
- 1978 Zagreb – Jorn Nerup (Denmark)
- 1979 Vienna – Stephen John Haslem Ashcroft (United Kingdom)
- 1980 Athens – Inge-Bert Täljedal (Sweden)
- 1981 Amsterdam – Pierre De Meyts (Belgium)
- 1982 Budapest – Gian Franco Bottazzo (United Kingdom)
- 1983 Oslo – Simon Howell (United Kingdom)
- 1984 London – Ake Lernmark (Denmark)
- 1985 Madrid – Emmanuel Van Obberghen (France)
- 1986 Rome – Daniel Pipeleers (Belgium)
- 1987 Leipzig – Jean-Louis Carpentier (Switzerland)
- 1988 Paris – John Charles Hutton (United Kingdom)
- 1989 Lisbon – Hans-Ulrich Häring (Germany)
- 1990 Copenhagen – Philippe Halban (Switzerland)
- 1991 Dublin – Christian Boitard (France)
- 1992 Prague – Emile Van Schaftingen (Belgium)
- 1993 Istanbul – Hannele Yki-Järvinen (Finland)
- 1994 Düsseldorf – Thomas Mandrup Poulsen (Denmark)
- 1995 Stockholm – John Todd (United Kingdom)
- 1996 Vienna – Patrik Rorsman (Denmark)
- 1997 Helsinki – Philippe Froguel (France)
- 1998 Barcelona – Johan H. Auwerx (France)
- 1999 Brussels – Raphael Scharfmann (France)
- 2000 Jerusalem – Helena Edlund (Sweden)
- 2001 Glasgow – Juleen R. Zierath (Sweden)
- 2002 Budapest – Bart O. Roep (The Netherlands)
- 2003 Paris – Michael Stumvoll (Germany)
- 2004 Munich – Guy A. Rutter (United Kingdom)
- 2005 Athens – Peter Rossing (Denmark)
- 2006 Copenhagen – Michael Roden (Austria)
- 2007 Amsterdam – Markus Stoffel (Switzerland)
- 2008 Rome – Jens Claus Brüning (Germany)
- 2009 Vienna – Gianluca Perseghin (Italy)
- 2010 Stockholm - Fiona Gribble (United Kingdom)
- 2011 Lisbon - Naveed Sattar (United Kingdom}
- 2012 Berlin - Tim Frayling (United Kingdom)
- 2013 Barcelona - Miriam Cnop (Belgium)
- 2014 Vienna - Anna Gloyn (United Kingdom)
- 2015 Stockholm - Matthias Blüher (Germany)
- 2016 Munich - Patrick Schrauwen (Netherlands)
- 2017 Lisbon - Ewan Pearson (United Kingdom)
- 2018 Berlin - Fredrik Bäckhed (Sweden)
- 2019 Barcelona - Filip K. Knop (Denmark)
- 2020 Virtual Meeting - Gian Paulo Fadini (Italy)
- 2021 Virtual Meeting - Amélie Bonnefond (France)
- 2022 Stockholm - Martin Heni (Germany)
