= Miriam Cnop =

Belgian researcher and physician

- Born: 25 December 1970 (age 55); Ixelles, Belgium
- Education: Vrije Universiteit Brussel (MD/PhD)
- Organization: Université libre de Bruxelles
- Awards: EFSD Rising Star; Oskar Minkowski Prize

Miriam Cnop (born 25 December 1970) is a Belgian researcher and physician specializing in diabetology. She is Professor of Medicine at Université Libre de Bruxelles and Clinical Director of Erasmus Hospital's Endocrinology Department. She leads the ULB Center For Diabetes Research. Her work centers on type 2 diabetes, in particular mechanisms of lipotoxicity using human islets of Langerhans and human induced pluripotent stem cell-derived β Cells. She is an associate member of the Royal Academy of Medicine of Belgium. In 2013, her work was awarded the Oskar Minkowski prize from the European Association for the Study of Diabetes.

== Early life and education ==
Miriam Cnop was born in Ixelles in 1970. Her father is mathematician Ivan Cnop, a professor at the Vrije Universiteit Brussel. She attended the Royal Athenaeum of Tervuren for her k-12 education.

In 1988, she started studying medicine at Vrije Universiteit Brussel. She graduated summa cum laude and valedictorian in 1995, realizing her graduate thesis on the effects of lipids on pancreatic beta cells under the supervision of Pipeleers. She earned a PhD degree from the same institution in 2002.

She was a post-doctoral fellow at University of Washington, Seattle, under the supervision of Steven Kahn, on a scholarship from the Belgian American Educational Foundation. She is board certified in Internal Medicine and did her sub-specialization in Endocrinology at Université Libre de Bruxelles in 2003.

== Career and research ==
Cnop's main research interest is pancreatic beta cell failure in type 2 diabetes and monogenic forms of diabetes. She contributed to show that lipotoxicity, the deleterious effect of saturated fatty acids, causes dysfunction and apoptosis of the beta cell. Her team demonstrated that the pancreas reaches its total capital of beta cells at age 20 years after which beta cells age with the body and may succumb to metabolic stress .

The monogenic forms of diabetes under study in her group include diseases due to mutations in genes with a role in endoplasmic reticulum stress, mitochondrial function and tRNA biology. Her team described the impact of TRMT10A deficiency in mammals, highlighting its role in the pathogenesis of microcephaly and early onset diabetes. She was the first to show incretin deficiency in a specific type of diabetes caused by RFX6 gene mutations. These monogenic forms may further our understanding of the complex processes leading to type 2 diabetes.

She studied the association between Friedreich's ataxia and diabetes in collaboration with other researchers from Université Libre de Bruxelles. While it was hitherto believed that this form of diabetes is due to insulin resistance, they showed that beta cell dysfunction and death are central to the pathogenesis of diabetes for patients presenting with this hereditary condition.

Her lab has been able to differentiate induced pluripotent stem cells from diabetic patients into pancreatic islet cells, in collaboration with Timo Otonkoski, Helsinki. This technology provides an opportunity to gain insight into the pathways leading to beta cell failure in diabetes and to test new therapies.

She participates in two European Union Innovative Medicines Initiatives, INNODIA and Rhapsody, on type 1 and type 2 diabetes. She also coordinates the European Union Horizon 2020 project T2DSystems that aims to develop a systems biomedicine approach for risk identification, prevention and treatment of type 2 diabetes.

== Awards and recognitions ==
- "Rising Star" of the European Association for the Study of Diabetes, 2005
- GB Morgagni Young Investigator Award, 2010
- Oskar Minkowski Prize of the European Association for the Study of Diabetes, 2013
- Auguste Loubatières Prize of the French Diabetes Society, 2014
