= Anna Gloyn =

Endocrinologist and geneticist

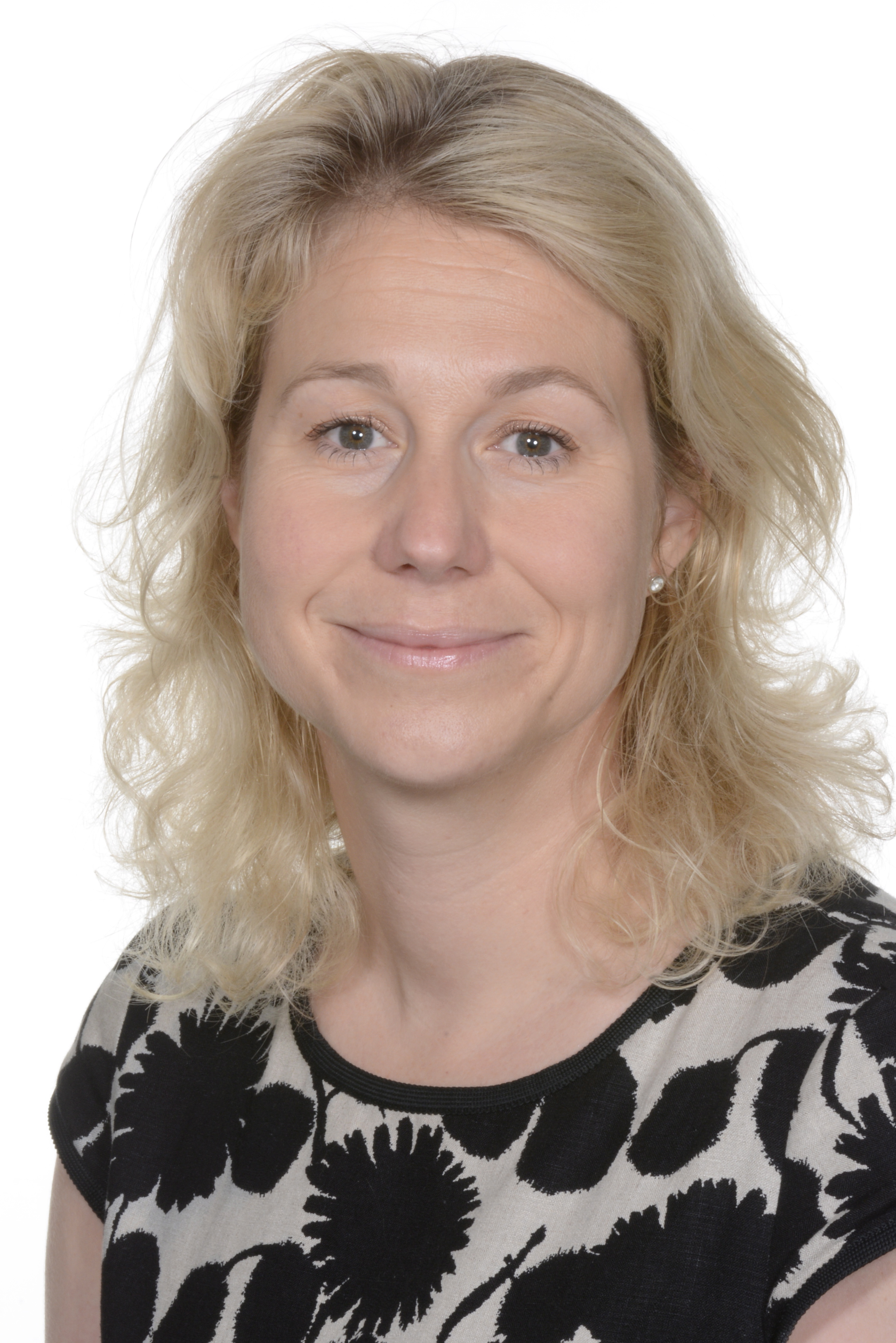
Professor Anna L Gloyn

Anna L Gloyn FMedSci is a geneticist, who is Professor of Pediatrics (Endocrinology) and Genetics at Stanford University. She was the recipient of the Minkowski Prize in 2014 for her research into causal mechanisms of diabetes pathogenesis. Her work has contributed to improved treatment options for people with rare forms of diabetes, and helped advance understanding of Type 2 diabetes.

== Education ==
Gloyn studied for a BSc in Medical Biochemistry at the University of Surrey. This was followed by a DPhil on the Molecular Genetics of Type 2 Diabetes at Green College at the University of Oxford, supervised by Professor Robert Turner. She worked at the University of Exeter for her post-doctoral training, supervised by Professors Andrew Hattersley & Sian Ellard, as well as Professor Franz M. Matschinsky at the University of Pennsylvania.

== Career ==
In 2004, Gloyn returned to the University of Oxford funded by a Diabetes UK RD Lawrence Career Development Fellowship to establish a research group to examine "beta-cell function through the investigation of genetic variants causally implicated in monogenic diabetes". In 2011 she was awarded a Wellcome Senior Fellowship in Basic Biomedical Science to continue her research. This was renewed in 2016. Her research has focused on how human genetic variants can be used as tools to examine how insulin secretion and action are regulated. In 2014 she was awarded the Minkowski Prize. The same year she was promoted to Professor of Molecular Genetics & Metabolism.

In 2020, Gloyn was appointed Professor of Pediatrics (Endocrinology) and of Genetics, at Stanford University. This appointment enabled the movement of her research group to Stanford where it now runs as the Translational Genomics of Diabetes Lab. Since her arrival at Stanford Gloyn has played roles in generating genetic data for the NIDDK funded Human Pancreas Analysis Programs for Type 1 and Type 2 Diabetes and the Integrated Islet Distribution Program In 2022 she was awarded the Outstanding Scientific Achievement award from the American Diabetes Association.

Gloyn is a founding member of the International Common Disease Alliance (ICDA). She is also a member of the executive committee of the Atlas of Variant Effects Alliance.

== Awards ==
- European Association for the Study of Diabetes (EASD) Rising Star Award (2005)
- Diabetes UK RD Lawrence Named Lecture (2009)
- GB Morgagni Silver Medal (2014)
- EASD Minkowski Prize (2014)
- Diabetes UK Dorothy Hodgkin Lecture (2019)
- American Diabetes Association Outstanding Scientific Achievement Award (2022)
- Elected Fellow of the Academy of Medical Sciences (2025)
- Endocrine Society & European Society for EndocrinologyTransatlantic Alliance Award (2026)
- University of Bergen Honorary Doctorate (2026)
