= Sattar =

Sattar or Settar (Arabic: ستار) is a male given name and surname of Arabic origin.

Notable people with the name include:

== Given name ==
- Sattar (singer) (born 1949), birth name Hasan Sattar, Iranian pop and traditional singer
- Sattar Alvi (born 1944), Pakistani fighter pilot
- Sattar Bahlulzade (1909–1974), Azerbaijani painter
- Sattar Beheshti (1977–2012), Iranian blogger who died under suspicious circumstances
- Sattar Hamedani (born 1974), Iranian footballer
- Sattar Jabbar Hilo (born 1956), Iraqi Mandaean priest
- Sattar Khan (1868–1914), Iranian revolutionary soldier
- Sattar Memon (born 1947), Indian-American doctor and author
- Sattar Sawut (born 1948), Chinese politician of Uyghur ethnicity
- Sattar Seid (born 1987), Iranian skier
- Sattar Zare (born 1982), Iranian footballer
- Settar Tanrıöğen (born 1960), Turkish actor

== Surname ==
- Arshia Sattar (born 1960), Indian translator and author
- Aziz Sattar (1925–2014), Malaysian actor
- Farooq Sattar (born 1960), Pakistani politician
- Hassan Sattar (born 1949), Iranian pop singer
- Lola Sattar (born 2005), English actress known as Lola Blue
- M. A. Sattar (1925–2009), Bangladeshi industrialist and politician
- Mohammad Abdus Sattar (1925–2011), Indian footballer
- Naveed Sattar, Scottish medical researcher
- Reefat Bin-Sattar (born 1974), Bangladeshi chess player
- Shadakshari Settar (1935–2020), Indian historian and archeologist
- Zita Sattar (born 1975), English actress
- Nurunnesa Sattar, Bengali politician
- Ramisha Sattar, American visual artist and animator

== See also ==
- Abd al-Sattar and variants, a given name
