= Gérard Karsenty =

Professor & endocrinologist

Gérard Karsenty is a geneticist and endocrinologist who is the Paul A. Marks Professor of Genetics and Development and chair of the Department of Genetics and Development at Columbia University Irving Medical Center. His research concerns the development and physiology of the skeleton, including its regulation by hormones and the nervous system and its own endocrine functions.

== Education and career ==
Karsenty received his MD and PhD from the University of Paris and completed postdoctoral training at the MD Anderson Cancer Center in Houston in 1990, in the laboratory of Benoit de Crombrugghe. He remained on the faculty at MD Anderson until 1997, moved to Baylor College of Medicine in 1998, and joined Columbia University in 2006.

== Research ==
=== Skeletal transcription factors ===
In 1997 Karsenty's laboratory reported that the transcription factor RUNX2 (then called Osf2/Cbfa1) activates osteoblast differentiation, and a related study reported that mutations in the human gene cause cleidocranial dysplasia. The Endocrine Society's citation for his 2016 award credits him with identifying Runx2 as the master transcription factor of osteoblast differentiation. The laboratory later reported that ATF4 is required for osteoblast differentiation and function and that Twist1 and Twist2 inhibit Runx2 function during skeletal development. In 2000 it reported that mice lacking the transcription factor Gcm2 have no parathyroid glands.

=== Mineralization, leptin and the nervous system ===
Karsenty's group reported that mice lacking matrix Gla protein develop calcification of arteries and cartilage. It also reported that the fat-derived hormone leptin inhibits bone formation through a hypothalamic relay, involving the sympathetic nervous system, and later described a brain serotonin-dependent pathway through which leptin regulates bone mass, appetite and energy expenditure. Karsenty has proposed that bone mass, energy metabolism and reproduction are under coordinated endocrine regulation.

=== Bone as an endocrine organ ===
His laboratory then tested whether bone itself acts as an endocrine organ. It reported that osteocalcin, a protein secreted by osteoblasts, regulates glucose metabolism and energy expenditure and stimulates testosterone production and male fertility through the receptor GPRC6A. Later studies from the laboratory reported that osteocalcin acts in the brain through the receptor GPR158 to affect memory, and described roles in brain development, muscle function during exercise and the acute stress response. Karsenty has proposed that the skeleton helps animals overcome danger.

== Awards and honors ==
- 2001: Louis V. Avioli Founders Award, American Society for Bone and Mineral Research
- 2001: D. Harold Copp Award, International Bone and Mineral Society
- 2008: Lee C. Howley Sr. Prize, Arthritis Foundation
- 2010: Richard Lounsbery Award, National Academy of Sciences and the French Academy of Sciences
- 2010: Jacobaeus Prize, Novo Nordisk Foundation
- 2011: William F. Neuman Award, American Society for Bone and Mineral Research
- 2011: Herbert A. Fleisch ESCEO-IOF Medal, International Osteoporosis Foundation
- 2012: Hoffenberg International Medal, Society for Endocrinology
- 2014: Elected member, National Academy of Medicine (then the Institute of Medicine)
- 2016: Roy O. Greep Award for Outstanding Research, Endocrine Society
- 2017: Elected associate member, European Molecular Biology Organization
