= Philippe Froguel =

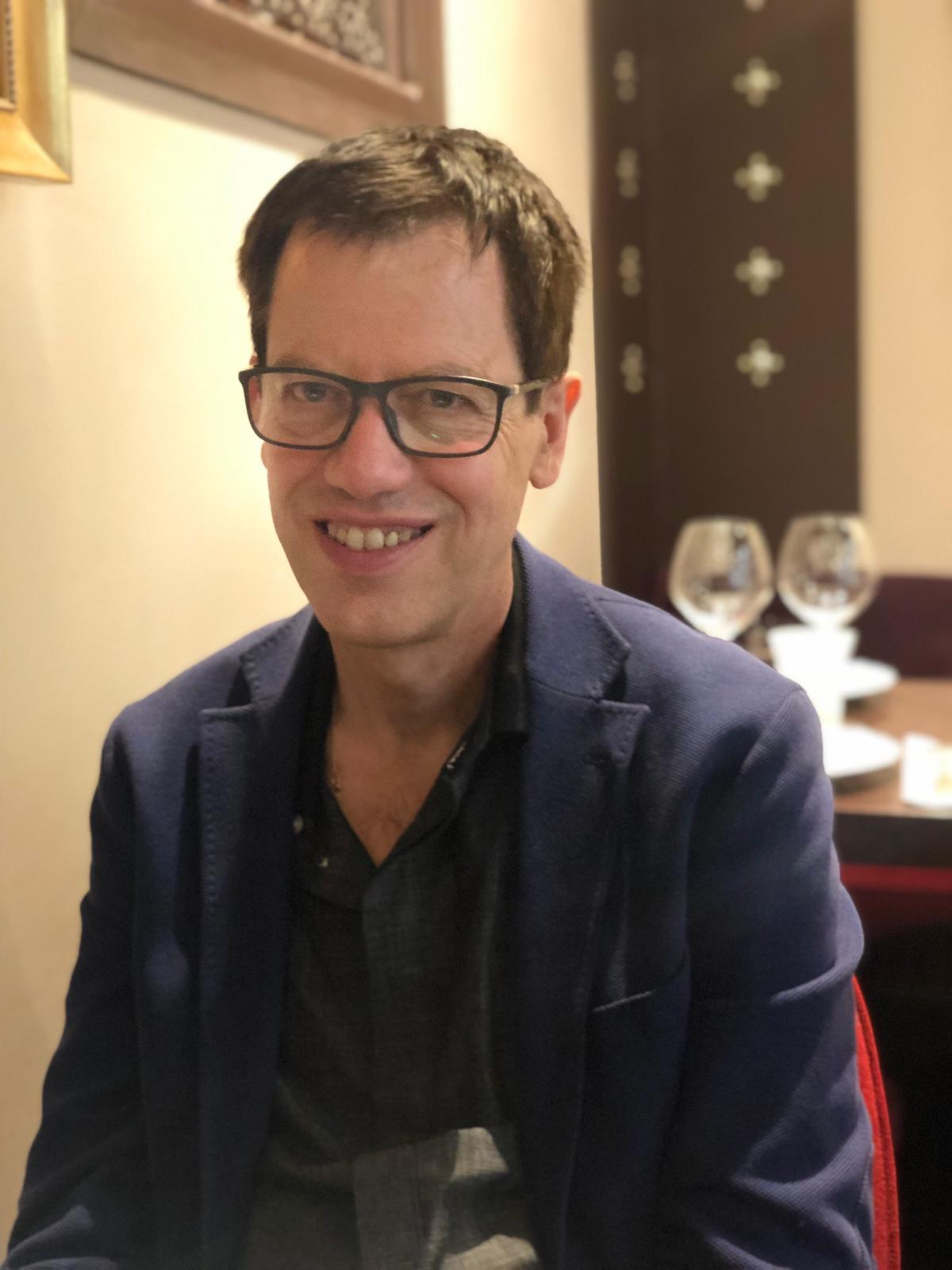
- Froguel in 2019
- Born: 14 April 1958 (age 68); Paris, France
- Education: Pierre and Marie Curie University; Paris Diderot University
- Awards: Minkowski Prize (1997)
- Scientific career
- Workplaces: University of Lille

Philippe Froguel (born 14 April 1958) is a French physician and scientist who serves as chair in Genomic Medicine in the Department of Metabolism, Digestion and Reproduction at Imperial College London. He is full professor at the University of Lille (which is itself affiliated with the CHU Lille University Hospital, the Pasteur Institute of Lille, the CNRS, and INSERM). His research has focused on the genetics of human diseases such as obesity and type 2 diabetes. This includes research identifying the genes glucokinase and HNF1 risk factors for type 2 diabetes. In 2007, he was elected to the Academy of Medical Sciences (UK). In 2017, he was elected corresponding member of the French Académie Nationale de Médecine, and he is also a member of the Mexican National Academy of Medicine (Academia Nacional de Medicina de México).

Froguel received his M.D. from Pierre and Marie Curie University and his Ph.D. from Paris Diderot University.

== Awards ==
In 1997 Froguel was awarded the Minkowski Prize by the European Association for the Study of Diabetes, for his work on the genetics of type 2 diabetes.
