= World Osteoporosis Day =

Health awareness day

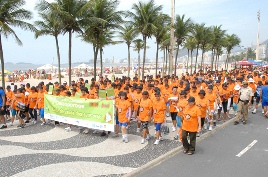
- A march in Rio de Janeiro, Brazil on October 20, 2010 to mark World Osteoporosis Day
- Date: 20 October
- Next time: 20 October 2027
- Frequency: Annual

World Osteoporosis Day is observed annually on 20 October, and launches a year-long campaign dedicated to raising global awareness of bone health, and of the prevention, diagnosis and treatment of osteoporosis and metabolic bone disease. Organized by the International Osteoporosis Foundation (IOF), the World Osteoporosis Day campaign is accompanied by community events and local campaigns by national osteoporosis patient societies from around the world with activities in over 90 countries.

== History ==
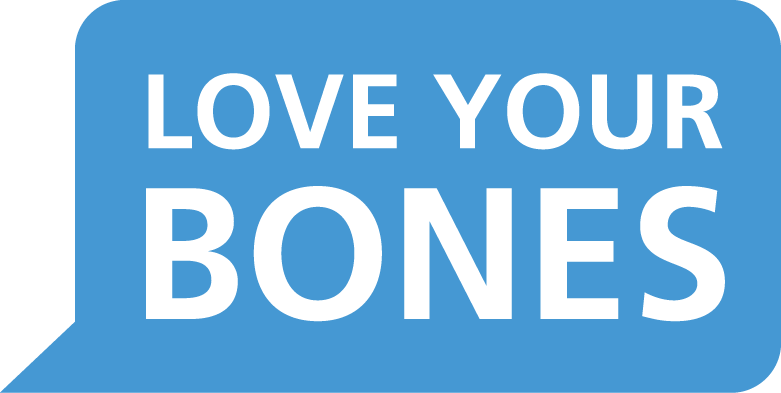

World Osteoporosis Day was launched on October 20, 1996, by the United Kingdom's National Osteoporosis Society and supported by the European Commission. Since 1997, this awareness day has been organised by the International Osteoporosis Foundation. In 1998 and 1999, the World Health Organization acted as co-sponsor of World Osteoporosis Day. The day marks the launch of a year-long campaign to raise awareness of osteoporosis and fragility fracture prevention. Since 1999 these campaigns have often featured a specific theme or tagline.

== Themes ==
- 1996: Awareness
- 1997: Awareness
- 1998: Awareness
- 1999: Early Detection
- 2000: Building Bone Health
- 2001: Bone Development in Youth
- 2002: Preventing a First Fracture
- 2003: Quality of Life
- 2004: Osteoporosis in Men
- 2005: Exercise
- 2006: Nutrition
- 2007: Risk Factors
- 2008: Advocate for Policy Change
- 2009: Advocate for Policy Change
- 2010: Signs and Symptoms of Spinal Fractures
- 2011: 3 Steps to Prevention: Calcium, Vitamin D and Exercise
- 2012: Stop at One: Make your First Break your Last
- 2013: Strong Women Make Stronger Women
- 2014: Real Men Build Their Strength from Within
- 2015: Serve Up Bone Strength
- 2016: Love Your Bones - Protect your Future
- 2017: Love Your Bones - Protect your Future
- 2018: This is a sign - Signs of spinal fractures
- 2019: That's Osteoporosis - New risk check/burden on patients
- 2020: That's Osteoporosis - One broken bone leads to another
- 2021: Take Action for Bone Health
- 2022: Step Up for Bone Health
- 2023: Build Better Bones
