= Helena Edlund =

Swedish professor

Helena Edlund is a Swedish professor and molecular biologist. She is a professor in Molecular Developmental Biology at Umeå University where she researches Type 2 diabetes and β-cell function. She is one of the founders, along with Thomas Edlund and Olof Karlsson, of the biopharmaceutical company Betagenon. Edlund was the recipient of the Minkowski Prize given by the European Association for the Study of Diabetes (EASD), and won the Eppendorf Prize. She is a member of the Royal Swedish Academy of Sciences.

== Life ==
Edlund received her Ph.D. from Umeå University in 1991. She began by studying chemistry, but soon moved into molecular biology, excited by a talk about DNA she attended. She is a professor in Molecular Developmental Biology at Umeå University where she researches pancreas function, Type 2 diabetes and β-cell function. She is one of the founders, along with Thomas Edlund and Olof Karlsson, of the biopharmaceutical company Betagenon.

In 2000, Edlund was the recipient of the Minkowski Prize given by the European Association for the Study of Diabetes (EASD) for her work in factors controlling beta-cell identity and glucose homeostasis. She also won the Eppendorf Prize in 1997. She was a Wallenberg Scholar in 2010, and her grant was extended in 2016. Edlund is a member of the Royal Swedish Academy of Sciences. She has written numerous articles on beta cell differentiation, beta cell function, pancreatic development, and Type 2 diabetes, and more recently on the links between Type 2 diabetes and the plaques formed in Parkinson's disease and Alzheimers disease.
