= United Kingdom Prospective Diabetes Study =

Clinical research study

The United Kingdom Prospective Diabetes Study (UKPDS) was the largest clinical research study into diabetes ever conducted at the time. The study was conceived by Professor Robert Turner at Oxford University in 1976, conducted in the UK in 1977-1997, and published main results in 1998.

== See also ==
- Diabetes Control and Complications Trial
