= German Diabetes Center =

Research institution

Coordinates: 51°12′17.2″N 6°47′14.6″E

German Diabetes Center (DDZ) Leibniz Center for Diabetes Research at Heinrich Heine University Düsseldorf
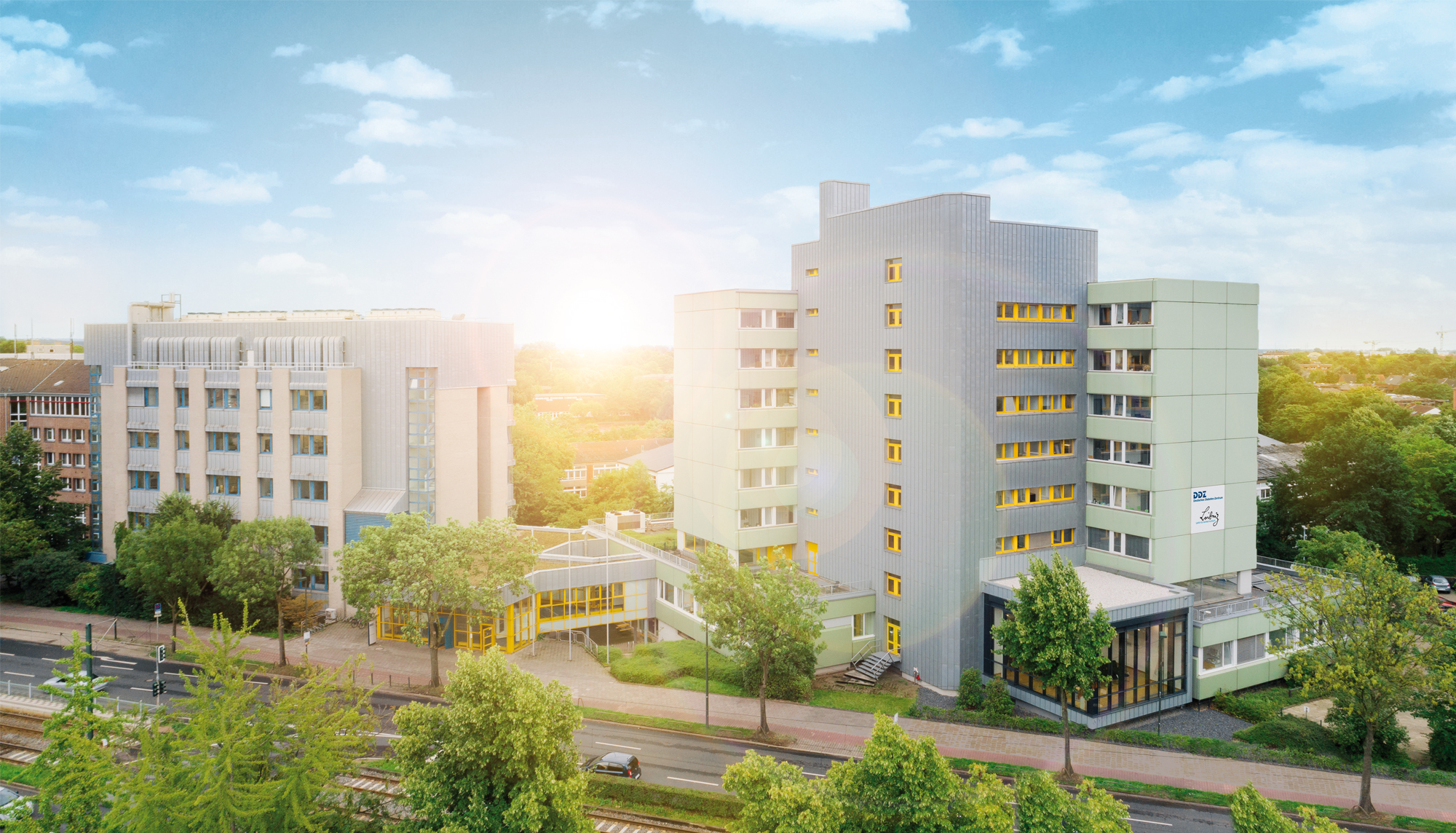
- German Diabetes Center (DDZ)
- Executive Board: Michael Roden (Chief Scientific Officer), Andreas Fidelak (Administrative Director)
- Faculty: Clinical Diabetology, Clinical Biochemistry and Pathobiochemistry, Biometrics and Epidemiology
- Staff: 240
- Budget: Federal (50%), State (50%)
- Location: Düsseldorf, Germany
- Website: www.ddz.de

The German Diabetes Center (DDZ), Leibniz Center for Diabetes Research at Heinrich Heine University (HHU), is a research institution based in Düsseldorf. In 1964, it was founded due to the initiative of Prof. Dr. med. Karl Oberdisse as an Association for the Promotion of Research on Diabetes mellitus (Gesellschaft zur Förderung der Erforschung der Zuckerkrankheit e.V.). The DDZ performs research on diabetes mellitus in a transdisciplinary approach. The aim is the prevention, early detection, diagnosis and treatment of diabetes and its sequelae. The work focuses on application-oriented research in the fields of clinical diabetology, clinical biochemistry and pathobiochemistry, biometrics and epidemiology, vascular and islet cell biology as well as health services research and health economics. The investigation of risk genes, mechanisms, individual lifestyles in combination with environmental influences and their long-term effects on the population and their supply play a decisive role. DDZ has also performed clinical studies and established several cohorts, such as the German Diabetes Study (GDS), which examines the course of diabetes as well as its sequelae. Since 2008, Michael Roden is the chief scientific officer and spokesman of the board of the DDZ as well as the director of the Institute for Clinical Diabetology. Additionally, he serves as the chief physician of the Division of Endocrinology and Diabetology at the University Hospital Düsseldorf.

The research center is under the legal body of Association of the German Diabetes Research Association (Deutsche Diabetes-Forschungsgesellschaft e.V.) as well as an affiliated institute of the HHU. As a "Leibniz Center for Diabetes Research", it is a member of the scientific community Gottfried Wilhelm Leibniz.

The DDZ has around 240 employees and works closely with the Division for Endocrinology and Diabetology of the University Hospital Düsseldorf, the Institute for Metabolic Physiology and the Institute for Health Services Research and Health Economics at HHU. The DDZ is also a founding partner in the German Center for Diabetes Research (DZD e.V.).

The DDZ runs numerous clinical studies. The multicenter German Diabetes Study (GDS), which is carried out together with the partners and associated partners of the DZD eV, examines the metabolic changes of currently 1,500 people with diabetes mellitus within the first year after diagnosis and observes the course of comorbidities and late effects for at least ten years. Together with the Leibniz Institute for Environmental Medical Research (IUF) Düsseldorf, the DDZ runs a study center of the German National Cohort (NAKO Gesundheitsstudie), which examines 10,000 of 200,000 people in Germany to enable improved prevention, early detection and diagnosis of common diseases such as cancer, diabetes and dementia. The DDZ is also conducting a study on metabolic changes after bariatric surgery in obese people (BARIA-DDZ). Since 1989, the DDZ has used a population-based diabetes incidence register to understand better the frequency of diabetes in childhood, adolescence and young adulthood. Additionally, it partakes in the Europe-wide cooperation project EURODIAB ACE to contribute to the epidemiology of type 1 diabetes.

Half of the finances from DDZ is funded by the Federal Ministry of Health (BMG) and the North Rhine-Westphalian Ministry of Culture and Science (MKW NRW) each. In addition, projects are funded by the European Union (EU), the German Research Foundation (DFG) and the Federal Ministry of Education and Research (BMBF).

== Research highlights ==
- The German Diabetes Study (GDS) provided inter alia information on new subtypes (clusters) of diabetes with different risks for complications associated with diabetes. Thus, scientists from the DDZ, partners from the DZD and the University of Lund have identified patients with severe insulin-resistant diabetes who have an increased risk of developing non-alcoholic fatty liver disease (NAFLD), while patients with severe insulin-deficient diabetes have an increased risk of diabetic polyneuropathy. According to the concept of precision medicine, these results should enable prevention-specific strategies for the prevention and treatment of diabetes as well as its consequences to be developed.
- Liver function disorders in obesity and diabetes are increasingly important in the clinical and socio-economic areas. Scientists at the DDZ have recently contributed to a better understanding of the energy metabolism at NAFLD (AG Prof. Roden) and to the mechanisms of liver regeneration (AG Prof. Lammert).
- Based on data from around 65 million people with statutory health insurance and the Federal Statistical Office, the DDZ (AG Prof. Rathmann) published projections of the number of type 2 diabetes cases in Germany. One result of this project is a web-based tool ("Diabetes watch") that shows the prevalence and incidence of diabetes in Germany in real time.
- Cardiovascular diseases are often associated with diabetes and contribute significantly to the increased patient mortality. As part of a collaborative research center SFB (1116) at the Medical Faculty at the HHU, which was set up by the DFG, scientists at the DDZ (Prof. Roden, PD Szendrödi) have been researching the involved "master switches for cardiac ischemia ". The aim is to better understand and ultimately reduce the acute complications of a heart attack and its effects, including its connection with metabolic disorders, such as diabetes mellitus.
- The early changes that favor the development of diabetes mellitus are not yet clearly known. In the DFG-funded Research Training Group (GRK) "vivid - in vivo studies of the early development of type 2 diabetes" (spokesperson: Prof. Al-Hasani), scientists from the natural sciences and medical faculties at the HHU research in cooperation with the DDZ research the mechanisms of the early causes of diabetes.
- Since 2018, the DDZ has been coordinating a Competence Center for Innovative Diabetes Therapy (KomIT) with the support of the state of North Rhine-Westphalia and the EU. A consortium of university and industrial partners aims to develop new therapies efficiently and to quickly translate innovative research, which results into clinical applications to improve diabetes management in patients.

== Von Mering Medal ==
Since 2016, the executive board of DDZ has awarded the "Von Mering Medal", which is named after Josef von Mering, to people who have been committed to German diabetes research and the DDZ for many years. Prize winners: 2016 Hans-Ulrich Häring, 2017 Hans-Georg Joost, 2018 Werner Waldhäusl, 2019 Guido Giani.

== Literature ==
- O. P. Zaharia, K. Strassburger, A. Strom, G. J. Bönhof, Y. Karusheva, S. Antoniou, K. Bódis, D. F. Markgraf, V. Burkart, K. Müssig, J. H. Hwang, O. Asplund, L. Groop, E. Ahlqvist, J. Seissler, P. Nawroth, S. Kopf, S. M. Schmid, M. Stumvoll, A. F. H. Pfeiffer, S. Kabisch, S. Tselmin, H. U. Häring, D. Ziegler, O. Kuss, J. Szendroedi, M. Roden: Risk of diabetes-associated diseases in subgroups of patients with recent-onset diabetes: a 5-year follow-up study. In: Lancet Diabetes Endocrinol. Bd. 7, Nr. 9, 2019, S. 657–736. doi:10.1016/S2213-8587(19)30187-1
- M. Neuenschwander, A. Ballon, K. S. Weber, T. Norat, D. Aune, L. Schwingshackl, S. Schlesinger: Role of diet in type 2 diabetes prevention: umbrella review of meta-analyses of prospective observational studies. In: BMJ 2019. doi:10.1136/bmj.l2368
- L. Lorenz, J. Axnick, T. Buschmann, C. Henning, S. Urner, S. Fang, H. Nurmi, N. Eichhorst, R. Holtmeier, K. Bódis, J. H. Hwang, K. Müssig, D. Eberhard, J. Stypmann, O. Kuss, M. Roden, K. Alitalo, D. Häussinger, E. Lammert: Mechanosensing by β1 integrin induces angiocrine signals for liver growth and survival. In: Nature. 2018 Sep 26. doi:10.1038/s41586-018-0522-3
- H. Claessen, T. Kvitkina, M. Narres, C. Trautner, I. Zöllner, B. Bertram, A. Icks: Markedly decreasing of blindness in people with and without diabetes in Southern Germany. In: Diabetes Care 2018; 41(3):478-484. doi:10.2337/dc17-2031
- A. Chadt, A. Immisch, C. de Wendt, C. Springer, Z. Zhou, T. Stermann, G. D. Holman, D. Loffing-Cueni, J. Loffing, H. G. Joost, H. Al-Hasani: Deletion of both Rab-GTPase–activating proteins TBC1D1 and TBC1D4 in mice eliminates insulin- and AICAR-stimulated glucose transport. In: Diabetes. 2015 Mar;64(3):746-59. doi:10.2337/db14-0368
