= Patrik Rorsman =

Swedish medical scientist

Professor Patrik Rorsman FRS FMedSci
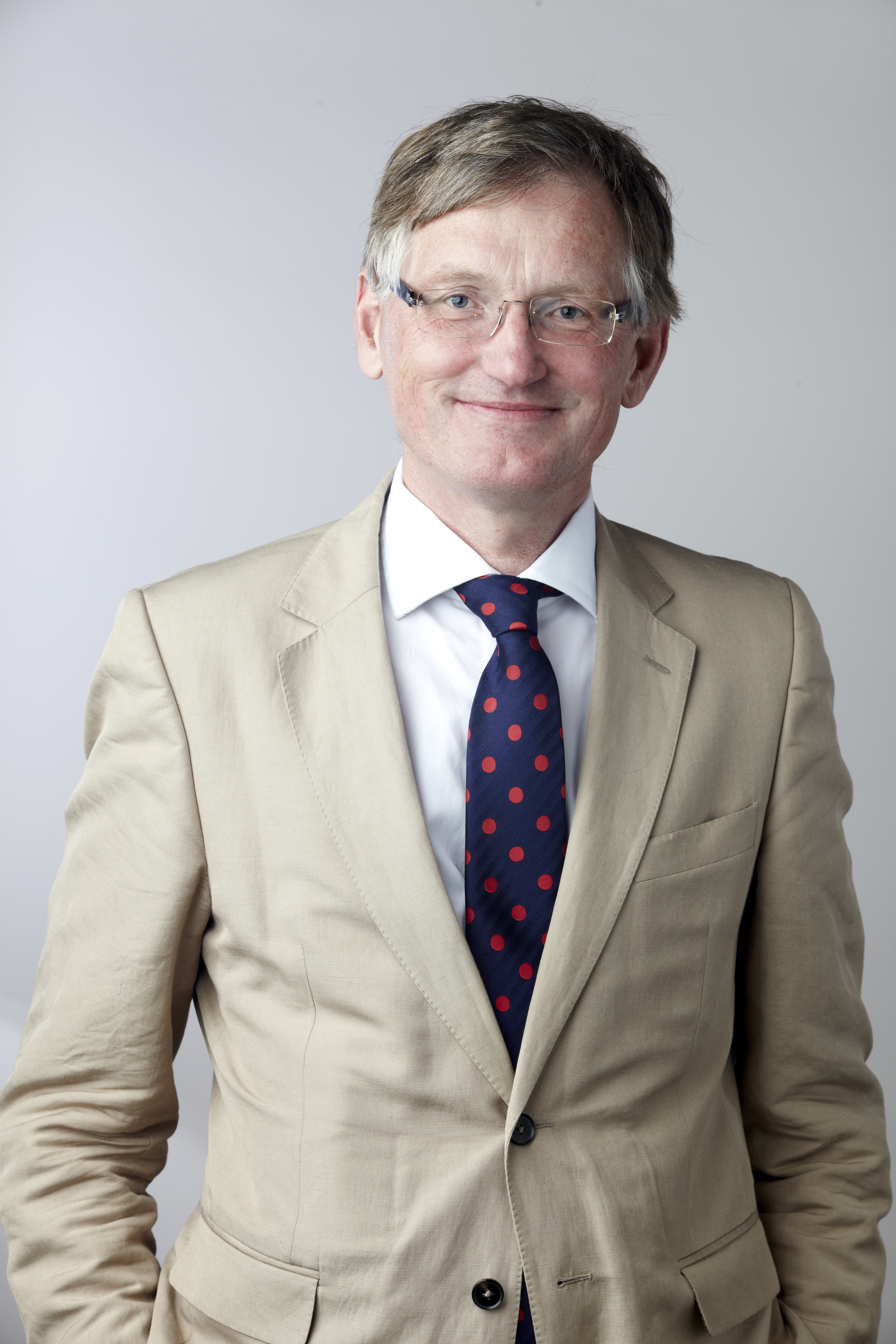
- Rorsman in 2014
- Born: 14 May 1959 (age 67); Lund, Sweden
- Education: Uppsala University
- Awards: FRS (2014); FMedSci (2010); Göran Gustafsson Prize (2003); Minkowski Prize (1996)
- Scientific career
- Fields: Exocytosis; Ion channels; Type 2 diabetes
- Workplaces: University of Oxford; University of Alberta; University of Gothenburg
- Thesis: Patch-clamp studies on pancreatic glucagon- and insulin-secreting cells (1986)
- Doctoral advisor: Bert Sakmann
- Website: ocdem.ox.ac.uk/patrik-rorsman

Olof Patrik Rorsman (born 1959) is a Swedish scientist who is Professor of Diabetic Medicine at the Oxford Centre for Diabetes, Endocrinology and Metabolism (OCDEM), in the Radcliffe Department of Medicine at the University of Oxford and a fellow of Harris Manchester College, Oxford.

== Education ==
Rorsman was educated at Uppsala University in Sweden where he was awarded a PhD under the supervision of Nobel laureate Bert Sakmann in 1986 for patch clamp studies of pancreatic cells and their secretion of glucagon and insulin.

== Career ==
Rorsman was for short time the Canadian Excellence in Research Chair (CERC) in Diabetes at the University of Alberta in Edmonton, before being reappointed a Professor at the University of Oxford in 2011.

== Research ==
Rorsman's research investigates exocytosis, ion channels and diabetes mellitus type 2. His research been funded by the Medical Research Council (MRC), the Royal Society, the Wolfson Foundation, the Knut and Alice Wallenberg Foundation, the Wellcome Trust and the Government of Canada.

== Awards and honours ==
Rorsman was elected a Fellow of the Royal Society (FRS) in 2014. His nomination reads:

Patrik Rorsman is an outstanding cell physiologist who has made distinguished contributions to our understanding of how the insulin- and glucagon-producing cells of the pancreatic islets regulate the plasma glucose concentration. His pioneering work is a shining example of post-genomic experimental diabetes research that integrates an unusual breadth of sophisticated methods and has clinical implications. It has led to the identification of key processes that become disrupted in type 2 diabetes, and shed light on the causal relationship between obesity and diabetes. He has also trained a school of excellent young investigators.

Rorsman was elected a Fellow of the Academy of Medical Sciences (FMedSci) in 2010. His nomination reads:

Patrik Rorsman is Professor of Diabetic Medicine at the University of Oxford. He has been at the forefront of pancreatic islets research for more than 20 years. His work integrates an unusual variety and breadth of sophisticated high-resolution methods including the whole-islet patch-clamp technique which has helped to bridge the gap between patch-clamp measurements on isolated cultured cells and hormone release by whole islets. Patrik's work also covers human islet cells, which has revealed important differences between ß-cells in man and experimental animals that are likely to be highly relevant to the understanding of the causes and treatment of human diabetes.

Rorsman was awarded the Minkowski Prize in 1996, the Göran Gustafsson Prize in 2003 and the Albert Renold Prize in 2013.
