= Damon Scott =

British entertainer

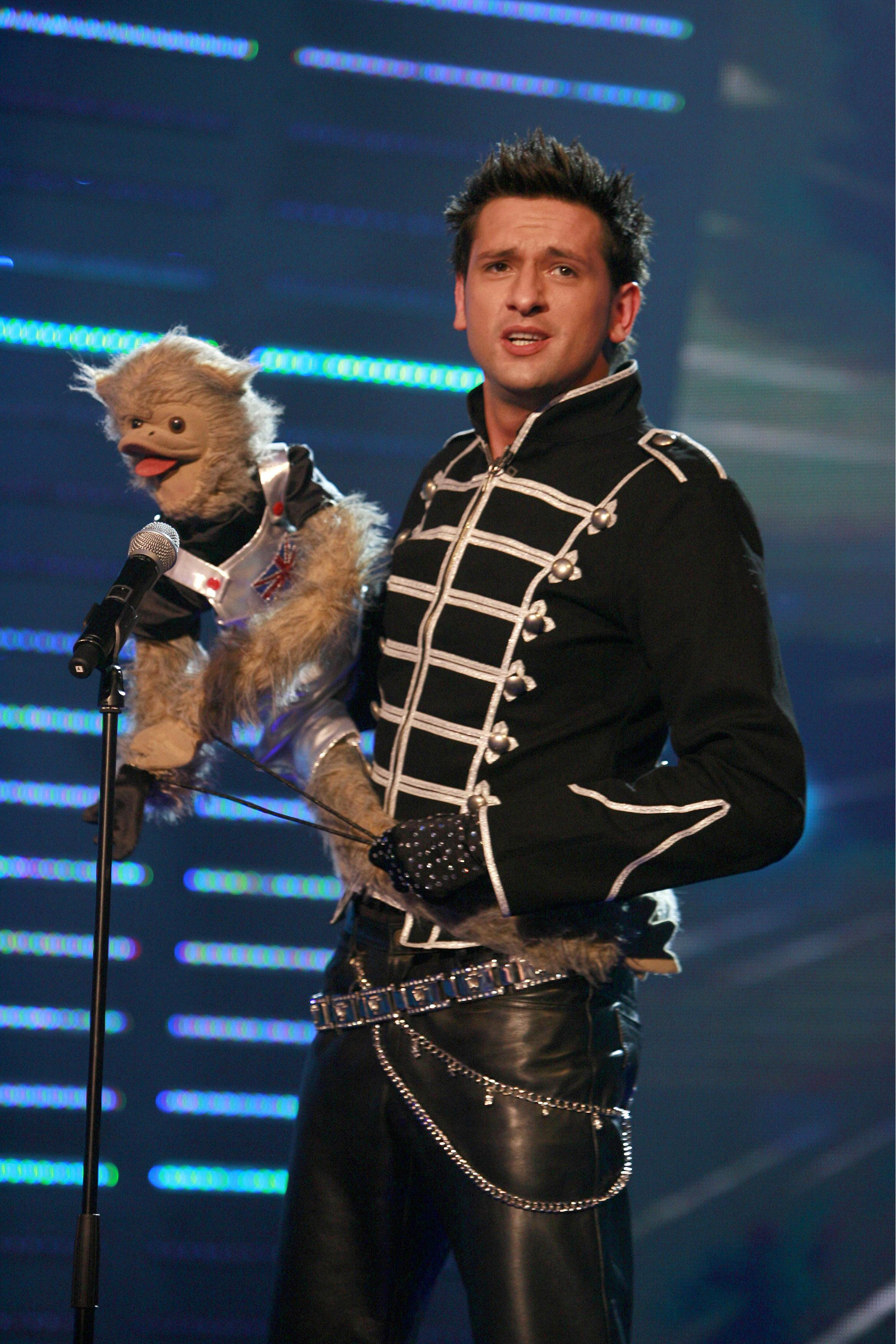
- Scott on Britain's Got Talent in June 2007

Background information
- Also known as: The Monkey Man
- Born: Damon Charles Scott; 18 October 1979 (age 46); Salisbury, Wiltshire, England
- Occupations: Singer; comedian; puppeteer
- Years active: 1996–present
- Website: www.damonscott.co.uk

Damon Scott (born 18 October 1979) is a British entertainer known for his appearance in the first series of the ITV variety talent show Britain's Got Talent. Scott is best known for his performances with monkey puppets, earning him the nickname The Monkey Man which became the title of a BBC documentary about him.

== Personal life ==
He was in a relationship with TV judge Craig Revel Horwood, known for his role on Strictly Come Dancing; they split in early 2016. He has been in a relationship with Matt Eden since 13 April 2016.

== En-Masse ==
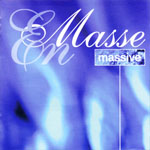
En-Masse logo.

Before becoming better known for his monkey routines Scott was part of a 40-strong group of singers from Southampton and Salisbury who come together to put on concerts twice a year under the name "En-Masse". The pop and soul collective covers a wide variety of music ranging from disco to Motown and rock to soul. As well as performing at the 900-capacity Salisbury City Hall twice a year, En-Masse toured many locations and released three albums and one single.

== British Resorts Association Search for a Star ==
In 1999, Scott entered the nationwide British Resorts Association Search for a Star Contest, which was sponsored by the Southern Daily Echo. is open to any kind of act from singers to dancers and musicians. When Scott appeared in the semi-final at the Bournemouth Pavilion he received best speciality award, the Stan Sowden Memorial Trophy, £500 cash, the judges' and the audience vote. The national final saw Scott take first prize, and collect a trophy, a cheque for £2,750, a voucher for a £400 costume, and entries in two stage publications, again winning the audience vote and best speciality act award.

Following Scott's success he was spotted when the head cameraman from the BBC attended the Southern Daily Echo Star Trail semi-final and he suggested to fellow programme makers that Scott would be a perfect subject for a BBC2 real life series which profiles the lives and careers of people aged 18–25.

When they started filming Scott they decided to make a special one-hour programme for BBC1 just about him and his puppets. In addition, they made a 20-minute pilot sitcom involving Damon playing a character called George, and his monkey puppet Bubbles. This was filmed over five days.

For the documentary Scott was filmed around his home town of Salisbury with Bubbles.

=== Gene Pitney & Damon ===
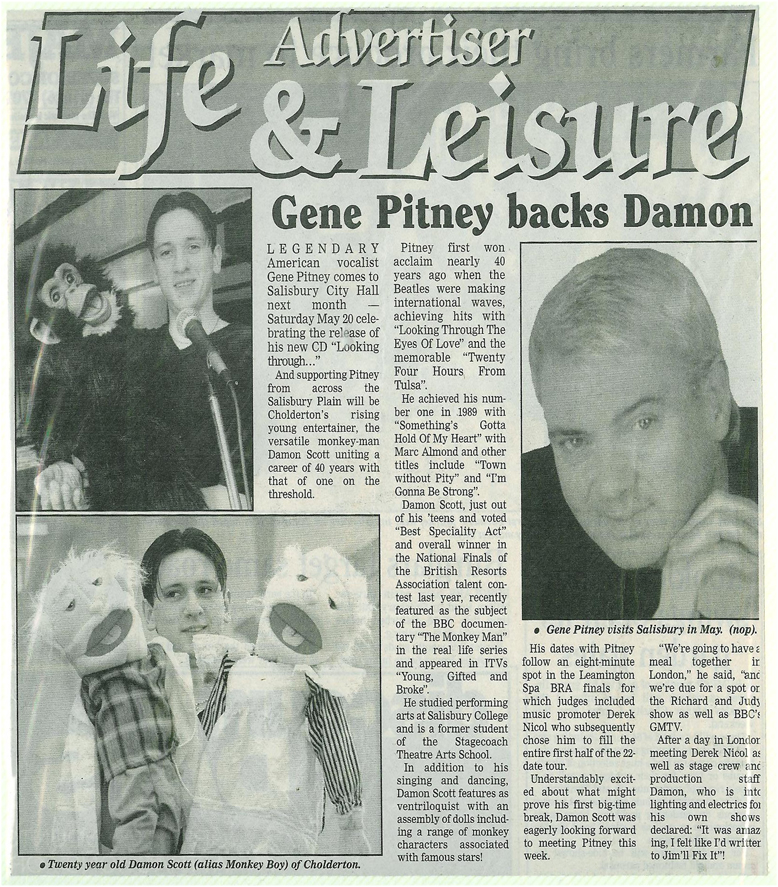
An article on Pitney's tour, featuring Scott.

Scott later landed a major UK tour with Gene Pitney. Scott was spotted by music promoter Derek Nicol after he won Southern Daily Echo Star Trail and went on to represent Bournemouth at the British Resorts Association national final in Leamington Spa. Nicol was one of the judges who awarded Scott not only first place but also the award for best speciality act. On the basis of an eight-minute performance, Nicol asked Scott to do the entire first half of each show on the 22-date tour. The tour started off at Southend's Cliffs Pavilion on 25 April 2000 and ended at the Bristol Hippodrome on 21 May 2000. A total audience of around 60,000 people saw him and many of the venues sold out. This was the third major British tour for the American singer in less than two years, and came as a result of the demand for the tickets on the two previous outings.

== Britain's Got Talent ==
In the early summer of 2007, ITV broadcast the first series of Britain's Got Talent.

=== Audition ===
Scott entered the auditions with his act with a monkey puppet named Bubbles, lipsynching to Michael Jackson songs. Scott and his monkey puppet, which mimed Jackson's "Earth Song", was the first to be given the thumbs up from the judges after receiving a standing ovation from the 2,000-strong audience and rave reviews from the judges. Simon Cowell said "Your timing is perfect and that's the difference between being talented and entertaining. That was super entertaining" then went on to joke that "It says a lot about the world today that I'm enjoying a monkey puppet more than Michael Jackson."

=== Semi-final ===
On 14 June 2007, the first of three semi-finals was broadcast live. Scott was among eight acts to perform for a place in the final. His act brought a different monkey puppet, named Stephen which he performed the song "No Matter What" by Boyzone, when Scott started singing as himself, Cowell hit his buzzer. Towards the end of the act, Scott sang with the puppet, getting the thumbs up from two of the three judges.

=== After the semi-final ===
After the semi-final in her Daily Mirror column Amanda Holden went on to say "In the auditions Monkey Boy was my top choice one of my personal favourites. I championed him from the start. He's got the talent and he'll give everyone a run for their money. He wasn't just another vent act, he injected new life into this art form. I've got no hint of what he'll do in the final but he'll pull out all the stops."

=== Final ===
The final was broadcast live on 17 June 2007. Scott returned with Bubbles to the delight of the judges, however he lost to opera singer Paul Potts.

=== After the show ===
Scott was invited to the Grand Order of Water Rats Annual ball 2007 as a guest in the Great Room of the Grosvenor House Hotel in London, and was delighted to not only be nominated for the 'Serge Ganjou Award' but to win it and collect the £4,000 prize. After the show, Damon performed at Amanda Holden's wedding to Chris Hughes held at Babington House, Somerset, on 10 December 2008.
