= Craig Revel Horwood =

Australian-British choreographer and director

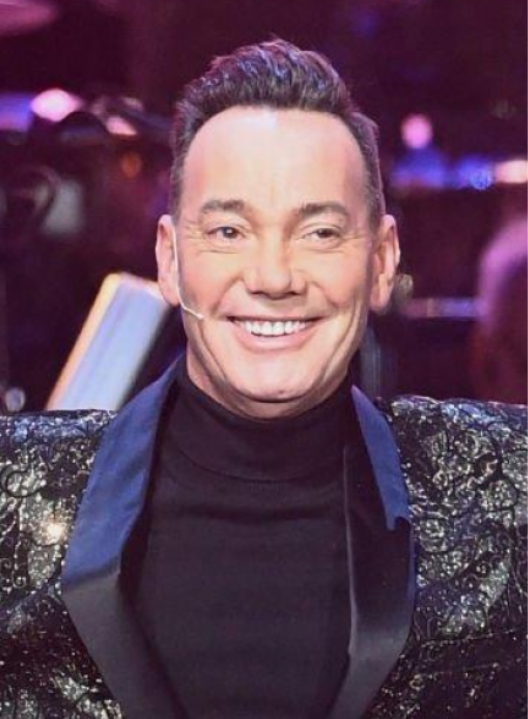
- Horwood in 2022
- Born: 4 January 1965 (age 61); Ballarat, Victoria, Australia
- Citizenship: Australia; United Kingdom (from 2011)
- Occupations: Author; ballroom dancer; choreographer; conductor; theatre director
- Spouse: Jane Horwood (m. 1990; div. 1992)
- Partner(s): Jonathan Myring (2018–present; engaged)

Craig Revel Horwood (born 4 January 1965) is an Australian–British dancer, choreographer, theatre director, author and former drag queen in the United Kingdom. He has twice been nominated for the Laurence Olivier Award for Best Theatre Choreographer, for his work on Spend Spend Spend (1999–2000) and the musical My One and Only (2001–2002).

Since 2004, Horwood has served as a judge on the BBC dancing series Strictly Come Dancing, the original version of the global Dancing with the Stars franchise. He is the longest serving and only original judge on the series.

== Early life and family ==
Craig Revel Horwood was born on 4 January 1965 in Ballarat in Victoria, Australia. His father Phil was a former Royal Australian Navy Lieutenant whose alcoholism had "torn their family apart". He started his career as a dancer in Melbourne, then moved to London to take advantage of the greater opportunities available there and to dance competitively. In 1989, he moved to the UK from Australia, and on 20 August 2011, he became a British citizen.

Revel is Horwood's middle name; it is not double-barrelled. In his autobiography, Horwood reveals that at the age of 17, he made money by appearing as a drag queen in bars and clubs and that his relationship with an unnamed celebrity was akin to prostitution.

== Career ==
=== Theatre ===
==== West End and UK ====
Horwood's West End credits as a choreographer include Spend Spend Spend (1999–2000) and the musical My One and Only (2001–2002), for both of which, he was nominated for the Laurence Olivier Award for Best Theatre Choreographer.

He was associate director and choreographer of West Side Story, assisted Bob Avian with Martin Guerre and was resident director of Miss Saigon. He choreographed Hard Times – The Musical, Calamity Jane, Tommy Cooper – Jus' Like That and the play Six Dance Lessons in Six Weeks, starring Claire Bloom and Billy Zane at the Theatre Royal, Haymarket. He also directed and choreographed Beautiful and Damned. He directed the Welsh Première Concert Production of My Land's Shore for the Gate Theatre in Cardiff. During the summer of 2008, he directed a new production of Andrew Lloyd Webber's musical Sunset Boulevard at the Watermill Theatre, which transferred to London's West End at the Comedy Theatre.

Horwood directed and choreographed the 2010–11 UK and Canadian tour of Chess, a revival of the 1986 musical conceived and written by Tim Rice, with music by Benny Andersson and Björn Ulvaeus (of ABBA). He has directed the UK Tour of Strictly Come Dancing since 2012. He then starred as Miss Hannigan in the UK touring production of Annie in 2015, 2019, 2023 and also the West End (in 2017) at the Piccadilly Theatre.

Regional theatre choreography credits include Pal Joey, Arcadia, On the Razzle and My One and Only at the Chichester Festival Theatre, Guys and Dolls in Sheffield, Anything Goes and South Pacific for Grange Park Opera and Hot Mikado at the Watermill Theatre in Newbury.

Horwood directed and choreographed the UK tour of musical Sister Act from 2016 to 2017; and in 2017 he directed and choreographed the UK tour of Son of a Preacher Man, a new musical featuring the music of Dusty Springfield. He directed Strictly Ballroom the Musical which was due to tour the UK from September 2020, but got pushed back to September 2022 due to COVID-19.

In the summer of 2024, Horwood starred in the UK tour of the musical The Wizard of Oz as the Wicked Witch of the West.

==== Special events ====
Horwood directed the opening ceremonies of the 2002 Commonwealth Games in Manchester and staged Once Upon a Time – The Life of Hans Christian Andersen, a live concert in Copenhagen to mark the author's bicentenary.

==== Pantomime ====
In December 2009, Horwood played the part of the Queen in Snow White and the Seven Dwarves at Venue Cymru in Llandudno, North Wales, a role he reprised in December 2010 at the Hawth in Crawley, and at the Orchard Theatre in Dartford, Kent, alongside Ann Widdecombe in 2011. Then in December 2012, he played the same role at the Swan Theatre in High Wycombe, again alongside Widdecombe and also in December 2013 at the Cliffs Pavilion, Southend. In 2014, 2015 and 2016, Horwood played Captain Hook in Peter Pan at The Orchard Theatre, Dartford, Wycombe Swan, High Wycombe and Churchill Theatre, Bromley.

In December 2017, he played the Wicked Queen in Snow White and the Seven Dwarves at the Mayflower Theatre, Southampton; and in December 2018, he played the Wicked Stepmother in Cinderella at the New Victoria Theatre, Woking. In December 2019, Horwood reprised his role as the Wicked Queen in Snow White and the Seven Dwarves at the Manchester Opera House, Manchester. In December 2021, he once again played the Wicked Stepmother in Cinderella at the Mayflower Theatre, Southampton alongside Debbie McGee. In December 2022, he played the Wicked Stepmother in Cinderella at the Bristol Hippodrome, Bristol. He reprised the role of Captain Hook in Peter Pan at the Milton Keynes Theatre, Milton Keynes in December 2024. In December 2025, played Wicked Stepmother in Cinderella at Theatre Royal Nottingham. In December 2026 he will play Carabosse for the first time in Sleeping Beauty at the Bristol Hippodrome, Bristol.

==== Solo tour ====
Horwood embarked on his first solo tour around England, The All Balls and Glitter Tour, talking about his life and performing some of the music that has been the soundtrack to his career. This was due to be during Spring 2020, but due to COVID-19 it was rescheduled for Spring 2022.

In 2025, Horwood emarked on another tour around the UK called Revelations, Songs Boys Don't Sing to coincide with his album. The tour was described as an evening of music, dance, drama, and song. He has announced further dates for this tour for 2026.

=== Television ===
==== Strictly Come Dancing ====
Horwood has been a member of the judging panel in the BBC dancing series Strictly Come Dancing, having appeared in 23 series, for 560 episodes (to March 2026) since its inception in 2004. He has a reputation for being the harshest of the judges and is often the recipient of jeering and booing from the studio audience, but he mostly ends on a positive note. He also received criticism for his apparent bias towards Emma Bunton in the fourth series of the competition. Horwood is known for stringently applying rules, as for example when marking down for an 'illegal lift' in some dances if the lady's foot leaves the floor.

Horwood has given a score of "1" more times than any other judge, with 10. He gave a "1" as part of the lowest-ever total score of 8 for Quentin Willson, dancing a Cha-cha-cha, in 2004. The routine was also the only ever single-digit score and the only time more than one member of the panel has given a score of "1".

Horwood has become known and imitated for his locutions, which often include exaggeratedly lengthened vowels, including: 'It was a complete dahnce di-sah-ster, dahling' and "Chah-Chah-Chah". These are available as ringtones through Horwood's website, with profits going to the National Osteoporosis Society. Another common utterance is 'Three words: Fab-u-lous!', with the syllables of the word articulated as three separate words. Horwood similarly breaks up the syllables and throws the stress forward to the final syllable for 'A-ma-zing!' To appreciate erotically charged routines, Horwood will declaim 'absolute filth', often immediately followed by '...and I loved it!' Passing judgment on Kimberley Walsh's freestyle in 2012, Horwood said the dance was 'indecent, improper, absolute filth', and added: 'I loved it.' He is often seen performing ballroom and Latin dance routines.

==== Dancing with the Stars ====
Horwood was a judge on Dancing with the Stars in New Zealand, along with Brendan Cole. He was also a judge on the Australian version of Dancing with the Stars for seasons 16 and 17, since its 2019 'revival', along with Sharna Burgess and Tristan MacManus.

==== Comic Relief Does Fame Academy ====
Horwood became a judge on Comic Relief Does Fame Academy in 2005, along with Lesley Garrett and Richard Park. He and Garrett replaced vocal coaches David Grant and Carrie Grant on the panel; however, the pair still appeared as voice coaches on the series. He returned as a judge for the third series of the Comic Relief edition in 2007.

=== Other television appearances ===
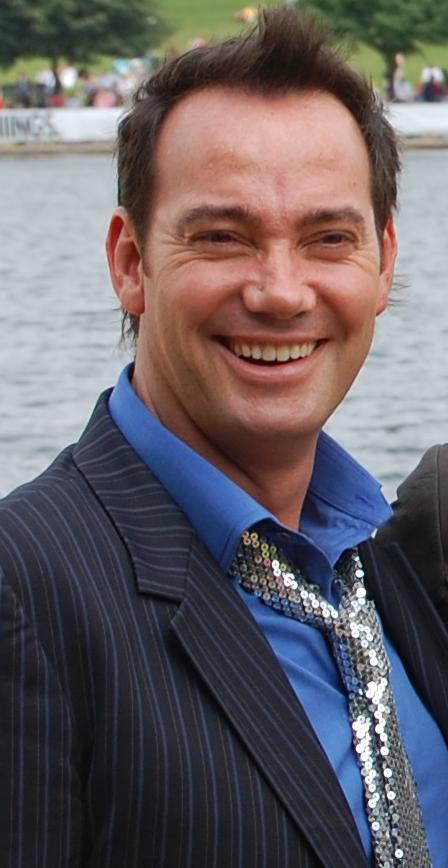
Horwood in 2008

Horwood appeared in Episode 5 of Series 2 of Louis Theroux's Weird Weekends, during which Theroux investigated the trials and tribulations of struggling New York City actors. In May and June 2007, Horwood appeared as a contestant on Celebrity MasterChef, reaching the final alongside Nadia Sawalha and Midge Ure.

On 15 April 2010, Horwood was the celebrity guest judge on Daily Cooks Challenge. On 13 August that year, he appeared on Would I Lie to You?. During 2011, he guested on Celebrity Juice and Ask Rhod Gilbert. In January 2012, he appeared on BBC television series The Magicians; and for the week beginning 3 September that year, he appeared as a panellist on The Wright Stuff on Channel 5, followed on 22 October by an appearance on ITV's Loose Women. Horwood also appeared on CBBC's television programme 12 Again, talking about his life when he was 12 years old; on 22 February 2013, he appeared on Room 101.

Horwood won the reworked version of the 2008 BBC series Maestro, called Maestro at the Opera; he competed against Josie Lawrence, Marcus du Sautoy and Trevor Nelson. Also appearing were Mark Elder, Danielle de Niese, Alfie Boe and Kiri te Kanawa. The series was partly filmed at London's Royal Opera House, where Horwood, as eventual winner, conducted Act II of La Bohème in late 2012.

Horwood lent his vocals to a single released by other celebrities under tutorage of choirmaster Gareth Malone for the Children in Need charity single of 2014; the choir performed a version of Avicii's "Wake Me Up". On 15 January 2016, he appeared as a panellist on a special edition of ITV's Loose Women (titled "Loose Women and Men") alongside series regulars Andrea McLean and Nadia Sawalha and fellow special hosts Peter Andre and Chris Kamara. He also starred in an edition of Who Do You Think You Are?, broadcast on 13 July 2017, in which he learned about his ancestry and family history.

Horwood also voiced the snake Cornelius in animated series Sadie Sparks, which airs on Disney Channel; and was woken up by Michael McIntyre in the Christmas Midnight Gameshow on Michael McIntyre's Big Christmas Show which aired on Christmas Day 2019.

In 2021, Horwood appeared on The Masked Dancer, masked as Knickerbocker Glory in the Semi-Final; he was the seventh celebrity to be unmasked. In June that same year, it was announced that Horwood would be seen joining fellow dancer, judge, presenter and choreographer Bruno Tonioli in Craig and Bruno's Great British Roadtrip; in the series of six half-hour episodes, made by RDF Television for ITV, the pair showcased routes and sights around Britain whilst indulging shared passions for fun, food, dance and classic cars.

=== Film ===
Horwood choreographed the final scene in Paddington 2 (2017); and made his screen acting debut as Emmanuel Cavendish in Nativity Rocks! (2018).

=== Music ===
In 2021, Horwood released a Christmas single, titled "It's Christmas, Merry Christmas!'" with Rietta Austin, charted at 21 on British iTunes. In 2024, Horwood released his debut solo album titled "Revelations, Songs Boys Don't Sing". Horwood announced a duets album with Austin, scheduled for release in 2026.

== Publications ==
Horwood has published three autobiographies with Michael O'Mara Books. All Balls and Glitter: My Life in 2008, Tales from the Dance Floor in 2013 and In Strictest Confidence in 2018.

In October 2020, Horwood released his first novel with Michael O'Mara Books, entitled Dances and Dreams on Diamond Street; the paperback edition was published in June 2021.

== Personal life ==
Horwood was married to Jane Horwood from 1990 to 1992. In December 2014, Horwood informed a reporter from OK! magazine that "I was bisexual for a long time. I flitted between men and women quite a lot between the ages of 17 and 26. My wife Jane left me for another man. Then I fell in love with a bloke. I have been gay ever since." His former partner Damon Scott had been a runner up on Britain's Got Talent.

Since early 2018, Horwood has been in a relationship with horticulturist Jonathan Myring. In April 2020, Horwood and Myring announced their engagement. The pair, who met on Tinder, became engaged while in Tasmania.

Horwood became a patron of the Royal Osteoporosis Society in 2009. In this, he has found common ground with Queen Camilla, the Society's Royal patron (whose mother, like his, had bone disease). The two of them danced the cha-cha-cha together, on a school visit to mark National Osteoporosis Day in 2009.

In January 2015, Horwood revealed on ITV's Loose Women that he suffered from anorexia and body dysmorphia as a teenager and young dancer, as a result of trying to make himself look like other young men, and other dancers in particular.

The 14th British series of Who Do You Think You Are? featured Horwood's ancestry in the second episode; in this, his family history research took him home to Australia, where he discovered that his family tree traces to Gloucestershire, Lancashire and Essex in England. Horwood found out that he is not the first dancer in his family, and that he is descended from gold prospectors who went bankrupt before becoming rich on finding a 250-ounce (7.1 kg) gold nugget. He also learned further that his great-great-grandfather, Moses Horwood, who is revealed in the programme to have been a petty criminal from England, was convicted at the Gloucestershire assizes and transported to Van Diemen's Land (Tasmania) in 1841. Criminal records identified by TheGenealogist include a transportation document for Moses Horwood, showing he departed England on 1 December 1841 on board a ship called the John Brewer.

In late 2021, Horwood moved to a seven-bedroom property dating back to 1867 in the Northamptonshire village of King's Cliffe. Horwood and Myring plan to marry, in August 2025, at St Matthew's Church, Normanton, at Rutland Water.

Horwood is a patron of the Royal Osteoporosis Society.

== Honours ==
Horwood has a waxwork in Madame Tussauds Blackpool which has been on display since July 2018.

On 20 July 2021, Horwood was made an Honorary Doctor of Arts by the University of Winchester at Winchester Cathedral.
