= Archives of Osteoporosis =

- Discipline: Osteoporosis
- Language: English
- Edited by: John Kanis and Felicia Cosman

Publication details
- History: 2006–present
- Publisher: Springer Science+Business Media
- Frequency: Annual
- Impact factor: 2.617 (2020)

Standard abbreviations
- ISO 4: Arch. Osteoporos.

Indexing
- ISSN: 1862-3522 (print); 1862-3514 (web)
- OCLC no.: 132980566

Links
- Journal homepage; Online access

Archives of Osteoporosis is a peer-reviewed medical journal published by Springer Science+Business Media. It was established in 2006 and is an official journal of the International Osteoporosis Foundation and the United States' National Osteoporosis Foundation. The journal is published yearly and covers the specificities of regions around the world concerning epidemiology, including reference values for bone density and bone metabolism, as well as clinical aspects of osteoporosis and other bone diseases. The current co-editors-in-chief are John Kanis and Felicia Cosman.
