= Royal Osteoporosis Society =

Charity in the United Kingdom

- Founded: 1986
- Type: Charity
- Purpose: Osteoporosis
- Headquarters: Bath, Somerset, England
- Region served: United Kingdom
- Key people: The Queen (president)
- Website: theros.org.uk
- Formerly called: National Osteoporosis Society

The Royal Osteoporosis Society (ROS), formerly the National Osteoporosis Society, established in 1986, is the only UK-wide charity dedicated to improving the prevention, diagnosis and treatment of osteoporosis. It is based in Bath, Somerset, England.

By the 1990s, the charity received a significant increase in membership, and its campaigns were making the disease better known in the UK. Through the organisation, the number of bone scanning units in the country has increased.

The website states: "We provide information, support and networks for people living with osteoporosis, and work with healthcare systems to improve diagnosis and care. Our sight is firmly set on a future where no one is affected by osteoporosis."

== Purpose ==
The charity focuses on the bone disease osteoporosis, which is a fragile bone condition and can lead to painful and debilitating broken bones, particularly of the wrist, hip and spine. Broken bones are also known as fractures. Often these occur from just a minor bump or fall and many such breaks could have been prevented with earlier diagnosis and treatment.

The society works on behalf of all those affected by the condition, to raise awareness and understanding of osteoporosis among the general public and health professionals. Its aim is to prevent future fractures and help and support people living with the condition today.

It is estimated that over three million people in Britain are affected by osteoporosis, causing around 500,000 broken bones every year.

== History ==
The charity was set up in Somerset in 1986 by Professor Allan Dixon and Linda Edwards. Its goal was raising awareness and fighting for those affected by osteoporosis. In 1987, membership of the new organisation grew by 2,000. The charity held its first scientific conference on osteoporosis and bone health in 1988, an annual event that continues today, attracting hundreds of health professionals.

Membership reached 13,500 in 1991 as increasing numbers of people affected by osteoporosis joined the charity for help and support. In 1992, the charity launched its telephone helpline with two specialist osteoporosis nurses. 1993 saw the charity develop its first education pack for schools, with the focus on helping people to build stronger bones. The following year, 50,000 leaflets about osteoporosis and bone health were sent to fracture clinics in hospitals across the UK. In 1996, the charity launched its first Research Appeal to fund ground-breaking research into osteoporosis and in 1997, the charity went online with its first website.

Queen Camilla has been president of the charity since 2001. Ambassadors include Dr Miriam Stoppard OBE, Miriam Margolyes OBE, Craig Revel Horwood, Susan Hampshire CBE, and Diana Moran BEM. Additionally, Professor Neil Gittoes BSc PhD FRCP, Consultant Endocrinologist, is a Trustee and Chair of the Clinical and Scientific Committee.

The charity was formerly known as the National Osteoporosis Society. On 23 September 2018, the charity announced that it had a rare Royal title approved by Queen Elizabeth II. In February 2019, the charity formally recognised its change of name to the Royal Osteoporosis Society with a launch event at the Science Museum in London.

== Organisation ==
=== Activities and programmes ===
In 2006, the charity launched a programme to provide mobile DXA scanning trucks, thanks to a donation from The Grand Lodge of Mark Master Masons. This developed into the Osteoporosis Scanning Services Development Project (OSSDP), providing funding for 14 separate projects in England and Wales. Separate manifestos for England, Wales, Scotland and Northern Ireland were launched in 2009, setting out steps to improve the prevention, diagnosis, treatment and care of osteoporosis. In 2010, 375,000 free information leaflets were sent out in response to enquiries from members and health professionals. At an event, the charity announced the launch of the Osteoporosis and Bone Research Academy. The Osteoporosis and Bone Research Academy is the first dedicated academy for osteoporosis. It is a collaborative venture with patients at its heart, which brings together leading researchers, clinicians and academics in the field to advance scientific knowledge and work towards a cure for the condition.

In 2014, the charity's drive to create more Fracture Liaison Services (FLS) across the UK, in partnership with local NHS A&E and orthopaedic departments, was set up to identify patients who have had a fracture and might be at risk of osteoporosis, then appropriately treating and referring patients. Fracture Liaison Services (FLS) systematically identify, treat, monitor and refer to appropriate services all patients aged over 50 years within a local population who have suffered a fragility fracture, with the aim of reducing their risk of subsequent fractures. The charity is working to establish UK-wide coverage of FLS, and aims to ensure that every person aged over 50 who breaks a bone is assessed for osteoporosis and managed appropriately through an FLS.

In 2016, the charity's income totalled more than £4.8 million. The same year, the Duchess of Cornwall wrote to British astronaut Tim Peake, thanking him for his help in osteoporosis research during his time in space. The work undertaken was designed to help researchers develop interventions to prevent bone loss and to help future space travellers as well as people living with osteoporosis on Earth.

In 2019, it marked two significant moments for the charity – it is the 25th anniversary since the Royal Osteoporosis Society, the European Foundation for Osteoporosis (now IOF) and the World Health Organization announced the landmark decision on how to clinically define osteoporosis across the world. It also marked 25 years since Royal Osteoporosis Society president, Her Royal Highness The Duchess of Cornwall, started her longstanding association with the charity.

=== Campaigns ===
In 1998, the charity worked with students from the London College of Fashion to host a fashion show highlighting the problems of finding great looking clothes to fit people with osteoporosis. The following year, Dr Miriam Stoppard OBE became an ambassador of the charity helping to raise awareness of the condition and actor Ross Kemp lent his support in launching the charity's Bone Friendly Logo, raising awareness of products beneficial to bone health. In 2000, the charity's national TV ad campaign titled 'It could happen to you' was seen by millions of people.

In 2006, the Duchess of Cornwall launched the Big Bone walk campaign, which she led approximately 90 children and osteoporosis sufferers for a 10-mile walk and climb around Loch Muick at the Balmoral Estate in Scotland to raise money for the charity. The campaign raised £200,000 and continues almost every year as one of the fundraisers for the charity.

In 2008, Craig Revel Horwood and Dr Miriam Stoppard OBE fronted the charity's ‘Boogie for Your Bones’ awareness campaign about building strong bones through dance. The 'Sunlight' campaign was launched in 2013 advising people about the bone-building benefits of safe exposure to the sun. Over 5,000 healthcare professionals downloaded the influential Vitamin D and Bone Health clinical guidance/guidelines from the campaign.

In 2017, the charity's most recent awareness campaign was launched, A Message to My Younger Self. Designed to start the conversation about bone health between the generations, the campaign focuses on the two key themes of Nutrition and Exercise. People were also invited to share a message to their younger selves, about the importance of building strong and healthy bones during childhood and adolescence. Launched in April, the campaign prompted wide scale interest and debate in the national press.

=== Funding ===
In 1998, the first government strategy on osteoporosis launched following years of campaigning. In 2003, the charity's network of local Support Groups reached 130. The groups, run by dedicated volunteers, worked to build awareness and offer support in their local communities. The charity's 10th annual conference in 2004 attracted almost 900 scientists and clinicians. As a result of a 2004 inquiry report by an All Party Group of MPs and politicians with an interest in osteoporosis, the Government announced £20 million extra funding for DXA bone density scanners in England in 2005.

In 2007, the charity launched a further Research Appeal to fund research into osteoporosis. In the same year, 24,000 people signed the charity's petition to call on the Prime Minister to review government guidance that recommended one type of treatment that one-quarter of people were unable to take. The petition was delivered to Downing Street, generating wide-scale publicity and media coverage.

To enable them to continue to drive forward engagement with FLS, the charity have set a fundraising target of £4m over the next 5 years, which will help to ensure all patients receive the same care and treatment across the UK through increased provision of FLS.

== Research and awards ==
The Royal Osteoporosis Society supports ground-breaking and pioneering research aimed at improving the prevention, diagnosis treatment of osteoporosis.

The charity has invested over £5 million in more than 130 projects which have enhanced knowledge and understanding of osteoporosis, leading to significant improvements in diagnosis and treatment.

Results from research funded by the charity which looked at the positive effects of hopping on the bone health of older men, were widely reported in the national media. Updates on the research funded by the charity were published in some of the UK's leading scientific journals during 2015, ensuring visibility of the charity's work in the bone health community.

=== Research Strategy ===
The charity launched its new Research Strategy in October 2017. The Research Strategy aspires to progress the Charity's four key aims to Care, Support, Prevent and Cure osteoporosis, and reinforces the charity's commitment to drive their research agenda through:

- Funding high-quality research
- Influencing and partnering with key bone health funders
- Supporting the next generation of osteoporosis research leaders
- Engaging the public with osteoporosis research

=== The Queen's Award for Osteoporosis ===
The Queen's Award for Osteoporosis (formerly the Duchess of Cornwall's Award) was created by the charity in 2009. It recognises an individual for their outstanding contribution to the field of osteoporosis, in any of the following areas:

- Clinical achievement and advancements
- Research
- Management and Leadership (progressed the National Osteoporosis Society and the osteoporosis agenda either *nationally or internationally)
- Voluntary achievements
- Contribution to the overall aims of the National Osteoporosis Society

Recipients to date have included:

- Professor Cyrus Cooper: Inaugural Duchess of Cornwall's Award (2009)
- Susan Hampshire CBE (2011)
- Professor David Marsh, Emeritus Professor of Clinical Orthopaedics at University College London (2016)
- ROS volunteer Christine Sharp (2020)
- Dr Nicky Peel (2024)
- Ivor Braka (2026)
