= Juleen Zierath =

American biologist

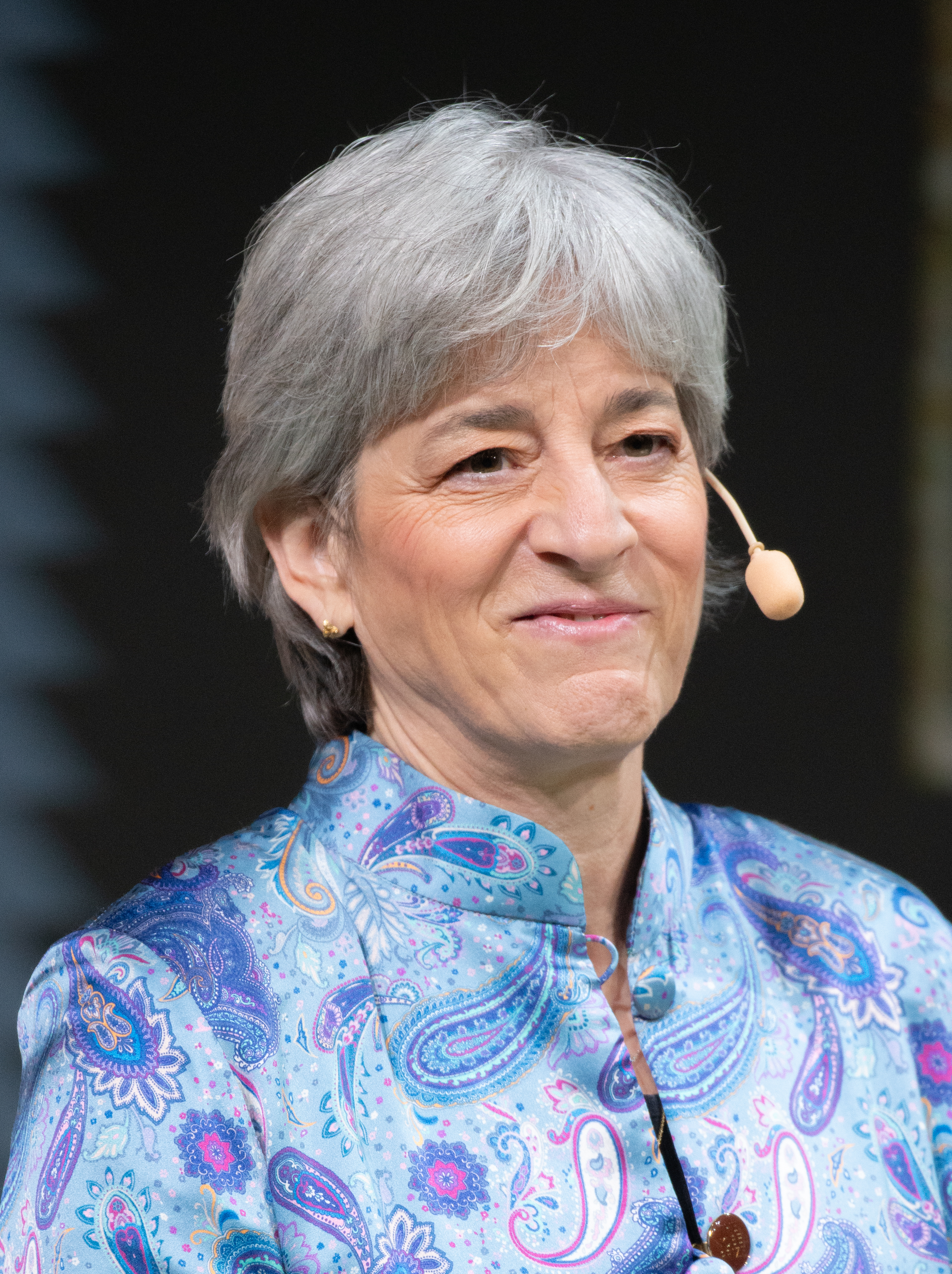
- Zierath at 2024 Nobel Week
- Born: 1961 (age 64–65); Milwaukee, Wisconsin, U.S.
- Citizenship: American Swedish
- Education: Ball State University; Karolinska Institute; Wisconsin School of Business
- Scientific career
- Fields: Biology

Juleen R. Zierath is an American-Swedish biologist. Her research focuses on the cellular mechanisms that correspond to the development of insulin resistance in Type II diabetes. Her other research areas look at exercise-mediated effects on skeletal muscle glucose metabolism and gene expression.

== Early life and education ==
Zierath was born in Milwaukee, Wisconsin. She earned her bachelor's degree in Secondary Education and Business Administration from the University of Wisconsin in 1984. Her master's degree in Exercise Physiology was earned from Ball State University in 1986. She then started a PhD in Physiology at Karolinska Institute and defended her thesis in 1995. Right afterwards she began a post-doc at Harvard Medical School.

== Career ==
In 1998, Zierath accepted an Associate Professor position at Karolinska Institute in Physiology.

From 2002 - 2008, she was Chairman of the Steering Committee of the Karolinska Institute Metabolism and Endocrinology Network, Karolinska Institutet, Stockholm, Sweden.

In 2006, she became a Member of the Scientific Advisory Board, Keystone Organization/Symposium, and also joined the Nobel Assembly, Karolinska Institutet.

In 2010, she was named Professor of Integrative Physiology, Scientific Director, Integrative Physiology Section, Novo Nordisk Foundation Center for Basic Metabolic Research, University of Copenhagen

Zierath was a member of the Nobel Committee for Physiology or Medicine in 2011−2016, after serving as an Adjunct member in 2008–2010, and was its chairman from 2013 to 2015. She is currently an adjunct member of the Nobel Committee for Physiology or Medicine https://www.nobelprizemedicine.org/selecting-laureates/the-nobel-committee/ . Other activities she is involved in include Director of the Strategic Research Program in Diabetes at Karolinska Institute, Editor-in-Chief of Diabetologia, Chair of the Board of Directors - Keystone Organization/Symposium and President of the European Association for the Study of Diabetes.

== Works ==
Zierath has published over 200 original research papers and review articles, and her work has been reported in scientific journals, including Nature (journal). Her research provided the first evidence for physiological regulation of insulin signaling pathways and revealed key steps along this pathway are impaired in diabetic patients. Another study showed that exercise can change the way that genes are expressed in muscle cells.
