= Osteoporosis International =

- Discipline: Osteoporosis
- Language: English
- Edited by: J.A. Kanis, F. Cosman

Publication details
- History: 1990-present
- Publisher: Springer Science+Business Media
- Frequency: Monthly
- Impact factor: 3.591 (2016)

Standard abbreviations
- ISO 4: Osteoporos. Int.

Indexing
- CODEN: OSINEP
- ISSN: 0937-941X (print); 1433-2965 (web)
- OCLC no.: 45478450

Links
- Journal homepage

Osteoporosis International is a peer-reviewed medical journal published by Springer Science+Business Media. The journal was launched in 1990. It is an official journal of the International Osteoporosis Foundation and the National Osteoporosis Foundation. The journal is published monthly and includes original research on all areas of osteoporosis and its related fields, alongside reviews, educational articles, and case reports.

The co-editors-in-chief are J.A. Kanis and F. Cosman. According to the Journal Citation Reports, the journal has a 2016 impact factor of 3.591, ranking it 52nd out of 138 journals in the category "Endocrinology and Metabolism".
