= Mark McCarthy =

University of Oxford professor

Mark I. McCarthy FMedSci FRCP FRSB is the Robert Turner Professor of Diabetic Medicine at the University of Oxford, where he is also a senior research fellow of Green Templeton College. He is recognized for his research on the genetic basis of type II diabetes.
