= Hannele Yki-Järvinen =

Finnish endocrinologist

Hannele Yki-Järvinen is a Finnish endocrinologist, who specialises in non-alcoholic fatty liver disease (NAFLD) and the treatment of type 2 diabetes.

== Career ==
Yki-Järvinen was an assistant professor at the University of Texas from 1994 to 2000. She was then an Academy Professor at the Academy of Finland from 1995 to 2000 and from 2000 to 2005.

As of 2021 she is professor of medicine at the Department of Medicine, University of Helsinki, Finland, and also head of the Division of Diabetes at the Helsinki University Central Hospital.

== Awards ==
She was the recipient of the Minkowski Award in 1993, and received the Anders Jahre Prize for Young Scientists in 1995.
