= Jane A. Cauley =

American epidemiologist

- Education: BSN in Nursing, Boston College, 1975; MPH in Epidemiology/Public Health Nursing at the University of Pittsburgh, 1980; DrPH. in Epidemiology in 1983.
- Scientific career
- Fields: Epidemiology, Osteoporosis
- Workplaces: University of Pittsburgh

Jane A. Cauley is a Distinguished Professor in the Department of Epidemiology and an Associate Dean for Research at the University of Pittsburgh.

== Education ==
Cauley received a BSN in Nursing at Boston College in 1975. She then continued to receive a MPH in Epidemiology/Public Health Nursing at the University of Pittsburgh in 1980 and a Doctor of Public Health in Epidemiology in 1983.

== Career ==
Cauley has been involved in women's health for over 25 years and is the Principal Investigator (PI) of cohort studies such as the Study of Osteoporotic Fracture (SOF) and the Osteoporotic Fracture Risk in Older Men (MrOS). She has made improvements for understanding osteoporosis in older men and women. She was the Co-PI for the Women's Health Initiative (WHI), study wide Chair of the Osteoporosis, and for almost throughout the whole trial she also was the Calcium and Vitamin D Committee. She is currently a Co-investigator for the Study of Women's Health Across the Nation (SWAN) for women transition-midlife to elder status-particular emphases on skeletal health, physical function and body composition changes, and a PI of a SWAN which examines novel measures of hip strength.

== Research areas ==
Cauley's research interests are on epidemiology of osteoporosis, osteoporosis treatment and the consequences of osteoporosis. She is also interested in breast cancer which is why she served on the American Society of Clinical Oncology Writing Group, about the use of bisphosphonates in women with breast cancer. She also focused on women's health and ageing, falls, the interaction between endogenous and exogenous hormones, risk factors, inflammation, and disease outcomes. She also examines the physical and psychological changes in postmenopausal women.

== Awards received ==
- 1986 NHLBI, FIRST Award: Epidemiology of Apo-Lipoprotein in Older Women (HL40489)
- 1990 Public Health Honor Society, Delta Omega Society
- 1996 American Epidemiological Society Membership
- 2002 Pittsburgh Post-Gazette: 1 of 12 scientists chosen as making a difference in your health
- 2003 American Society for Bone & Mineral Research (ASMBR), Elected Council Member
- 2004 University of Pittsburgh, Graduate School of Public Health, (GSPH) Distinguished Alumni Award
- 2004 University of Pittsburgh, GSPH, President, Faculty Senate Executive Committee
- 2011 University of Pittsburgh, Provost's Award for Excellence in Mentoring
- 2011 ASBMR, Frederic C. Bartter Award
- 2014 SmithBucklin Leadership Institute, Member
- 2014 European Calcified Tissue Society, Golden Femur Award
- 2014 Reuters Influential Scientists, The World's Most Influential Scientific Minds
- 2016 President of the American Society for Bone and Mineral Research

== Works ==
- Cauley, JA (March 2012). "Bone loss associated with prevention of breast cancer". The Lancet. Oncology. 13 (3): 221–2. doi:10.1016/S1470-2045(12)70030-X. PMID 22318094.
- Farhat, GN; Parimi, N; Chlebowski, RT; Manson, JE; Anderson, G; Huang, AJ; Vittinghoff, E; Lee, JS; Lacroix, AZ; Cauley, JA; Jackson, R; Grady, D; Lane, DS; Phillips, L; Simon, MS; Cummings, SR (2 October 2013). "Sex hormone levels and risk of breast cancer with estrogen plus progestin". Journal of the National Cancer Institute. 105 (19): 1496–503. doi:10.1093/jnci/djt243. PMC 3787910. PMID 24041978.
- Cauley, JA; Chlebowski, RT; Wactawski-Wende, J; Robbins, JA; Rodabough, RJ; Chen, Z; Johnson, KC; O'Sullivan, MJ; Jackson, RD; Manson, JE (November 2013). "Calcium plus vitamin D supplementation and health outcomes five years after active intervention ended: the Women's Health Initiative". Journal of Women's Health. 22 (11): 915–29. doi:10.1089/jwh.2013.4270. PMC 3882746. PMID 24131320.
- Orchard, TS; Larson, JC; Alghothani, N; Bout-Tabaku, S; Cauley, JA; Chen, Z; LaCroix, AZ; Wactawski-Wende, J; Jackson, RD (April 2014). "Magnesium intake, bone mineral density, and fractures: results from the Women's Health Initiative Observational Study". The American Journal of Clinical Nutrition. 99 (4): 926–33. doi:10.3945/ajcn.113.067488. PMC 3953885. PMID 24500155.
- Cauley, JA; Chalhoub, D; Kassem, AM; Fuleihan, Gel-H (June 2014). "Geographic and ethnic disparities in osteoporotic fractures". Nature Reviews. Endocrinology. 10 (6): 338–51. doi:10.1038/nrendo.2014.51. PMID 24751883. S2CID 14389967.
- Hue, TF; Cummings, SR; Cauley, JA; Bauer, DC; Ensrud, KE; Barrett-Connor, E; Black, DM (October 2014). "Effect of bisphosphonate use on risk of postmenopausal breast cancer: results from the randomized clinical trials of alendronate and zoledronic acid". JAMA Internal Medicine. 174 (10): 1550–7. doi:10.1001/jamainternmed.2014.3634. PMC 4398333. PMID 25111880.
