= Johan Auwerx =

Belgian biologist

Professor Johan Auwerx
- Born: Diepenbeek, Belgium
- Title: Professor
- Awards: Oskar Minkowski Prize 1998; Danone International Prize for Nutrition 2009; Marcel Benoist Prize 2016

Academic background
- Education: Université catholique de Louvain

Academic work
- Discipline: Cell Biology
- Sub-discipline: Metabolism
- Institutions: École Polytechnique Fédérale de Lausanne
- Main interests: Metabolic disorders, cell metabolism, mitochondrion
- Website: Auwerx lab at EPFL

Johan Auwerx (born 1958 in Diepenbeek, Belgium) is a Belgian biologist, and a professor at the École Polytechnique Fédérale de Lausanne (EPFL). His research in the fields of cellular metabolism has contributed to a better understanding of the regulation of mitochondrial function by signaling pathways.

== Career ==
Johan Auwerx studied medicine at the Université catholique de Louvain and received his doctoral degree in 1982. He then worked as a post-doctoral researcher at the University of Washington in Seattle, and was appointed professor at the Louis Pasteur University in Strasbourg, and at the École polytechnique fédérale de Lausanne in 2008. He leads the Laboratory of Integrative Systems Physiology (LISP) and occupies the Nestlé chair on energy metabolism.

Johan Auwerx's lab studies how factors such as diet, physical exercise or hormones regulate metabolism by altering gene expression through modulating the activity of transcription factors and co-factors.

== Distinctions ==
Johan Auwerx was elected as an EMBO member in 2003. In 2016, he was awarded the Marcel Benoist Prize for his work on mitochondria and their role in metabolism, and more specifically on how nutrients can influence cellular behavior, thereby initiating fat cell breakdown or preventing metabolic disorders. Johan Auwerx was awarded several other prizes, such as the Danone International prize for nutrition (2008), the Oskar Minkowski Prize (1998) and the Morgagni Gold Medal. He is on the editorial board of journals such as Science, Cell Metabolism, The EMBO Journal and The Journal of Cell Biology. As of 2020, his publications have been cited more than 100,000 times and his h-index is 166. He is therefore a highly cited researcher, according to the Institute for Scientific Information.
