= Michael Roden =

German endocrinologist

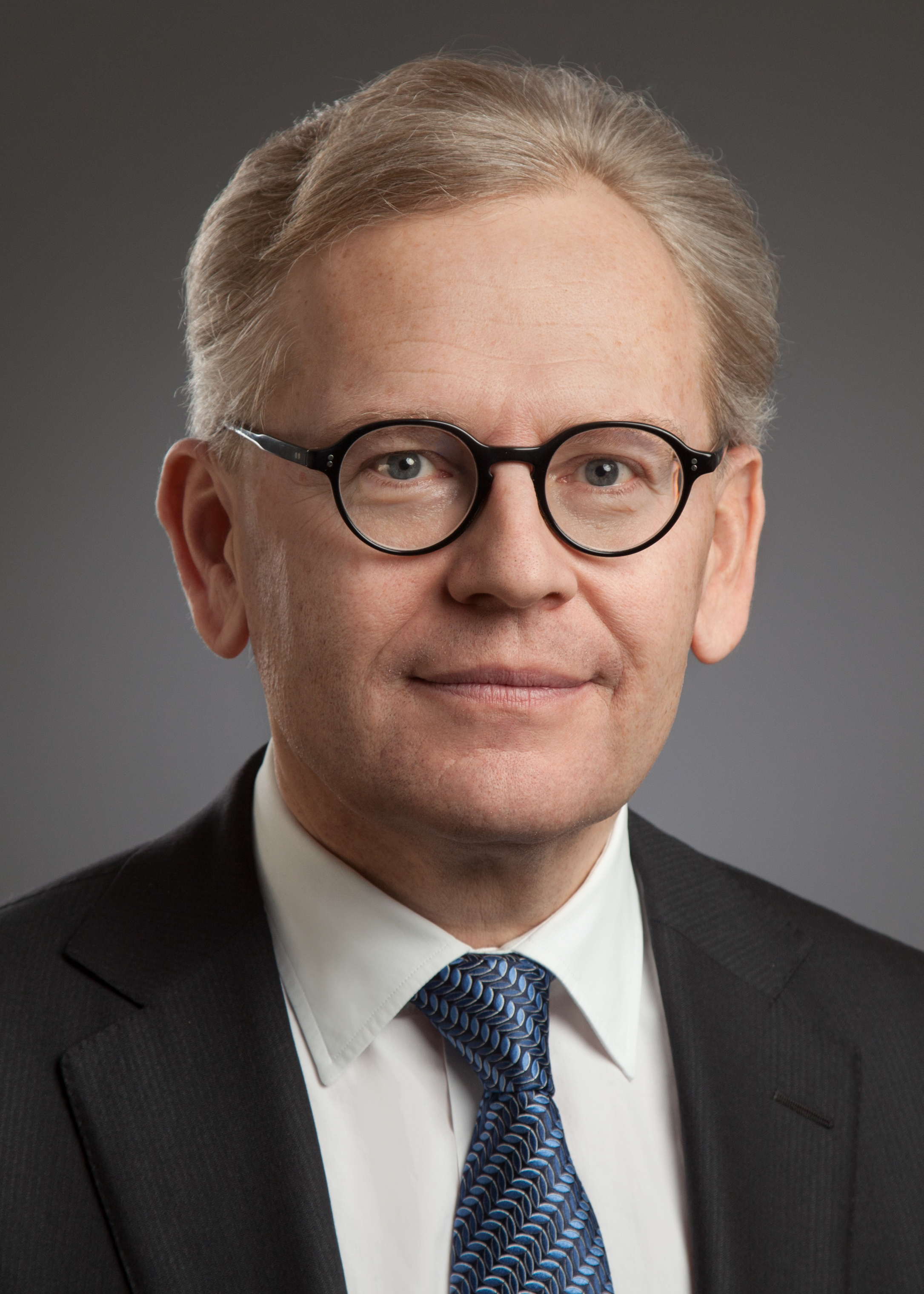
Michael Roden

Michael Roden (born February 11, 1961) is Professor and Chairman of Internal Medicine, Endocrinology and Metabolic Disorders at Heinrich Heine University Düsseldorf, Director of the Division of Endocrinology and Diabetology at the University Hospital of Düsseldorf and Spokesman for the Executive Board and Scientific Director of the German Diabetes Center, the Leibniz Center for Diabetes Research at the Heinrich Heine University Düsseldorf (Legal body: Deutsche Diabetes-Forschungsgesellschaft eV).

== Career and appointments ==
After finishing high school at Akademisches Gymnasium Vienna, Austria, and study of medicine in 1986 at the University of Vienna, he started his career as an assistant at the Pharmacological Institute. In 1988, he began working at the 1st Medical University Clinic of the University of Vienna, where he acquired the “venia legendi” in Internal Medicine in 1994. He then worked as Max-Kade Fellow in the Section of Endocrinology at Yale University in 1994/1995. After returning to the Division for Endocrinology and Metabolism at the University Clinic of Internal Medicine III at the General Hospital Vienna as a senior physician, he was appointed as Associate Professor in 1997. From 2003 to 2009, he served as chairman and director of the 1st Medical Department including the Division of Nephrology at Hanusch Hospital, Teaching Hospital of the Medical University of Vienna. In 2005, he founded the Karl Landsteiner Institute for Endocrinology and Metabolic Diseases. After accepting the call as chairman and professor in Düsseldorf, he became a board member of the German Center for Diabetes Research in 2009. In 2016, he was appointed by the Federal President of Germany as a member of the Science Council of the Federal Government and the Governments of the federal states of Germany. Since 2017, he has been contributing his knowledge and experience there as Chairman of its Medical Committee. As President, he led the 54th annual meeting of the German Diabetes Association in 2019 with the slogan "Diabetes - Not only a question of type". In addition, Roden is a member of numerous scientific advisory boards such as the Scientific Advisory Board of the Medical University of Vienna.

== Research contributions ==
Michael Roden’s research focusses on energy metabolism in humans under physiological conditions and with metabolic disorders such as metabolic syndrome, diabetes mellitus and non-alcoholic fatty liver disease. He has made major contributions to our understanding of the cellular mechanisms of fatty acid- and amino acid-induced insulin resistance in humans. Additionally, he examined the function of mitochondria in muscle and liver tissue. With his research group, he is contributing to the development of novel non-invasive methods for real-time analysis of tissue-specific metabolism. His studies demonstrated that alterations of mitochondrial function can decisively influence the development and progress of diabetes and non-alcoholic fatty liver disease. His recent research contributes to a novel differentiation of diabetes subtypes with various risks for their sequelae and promotes the way to precision medicine for people with diabetes.

Roden is the author of more than 700 "peer-reviewed" publications, co-author of (inter)national guidelines and the editor of the book "Clinical Diabetes Research: Methods and Techniques". According to the Scopus database, it has an h-index of 103.

== Selected honors & awards ==
- 2001: Ferdinand-Bertram Award of the German Diabetes Society
- 2001: Novartis (Sandoz) Award for Chemistry, Biology, Medicine, Austria
- 2004: International Novartis Award for Innovative Patient Oriented Research
- 2006: ESCI (Mack-Foster) Award for Excellence in Clinical Sciences
- 2006: Oskar-Minkowski Award of the European Association for the Study of Diabetes
- 2013: Honorary doctorate from the Medical Faculty of the University of Belgrade
- 2014: Somogyi Award of the Hungarian Diabetes Society (Magyar Diabetes Társaság)
- 2016: Honorary doctorate from the Medical Faculty of the National and Kapodistrian University Athens
- 2017: Paul-Langerhans Medal of the German Diabetes Society (DDG)
- 2018: G. B. Morgagni Prize and Gold Medal Career Achievement
- 2021: Werner-Creutzfeldt-Prize of the German Diabetes Society
- 2021: Honorary membership of the Hungarian Diabetes Society
- 2022: Membership of the National Academy of Sciences Leopoldina, section Internal Medicine and Dermatology
- 2022: Membership of the Academia Europaea
- 2022: Highly Cited Researcher according to Clarivate Analytics
- 2023: Highly Cited Researcher according to Clarivate Analytics
