= Naveed Sattar =

Scottish medical researcher

Professor Naveed Sattar FMedSci FRCPath FRCPGlas FRSE
- Born: Naveed Amjid Sattar
- Education: University of Glasgow
- Awards: Minkowski Prize
- Scientific career
- Fields: Medicine
- Institutions: University of Glasgow
- Thesis: Lipids and lipoproteins in normal and complicated pregnancies (1998)

Naveed Amjid Sattar is a Scottish medical researcher and Professor of Metabolic Medicine at the Institute of Cardiovascular & Medical Sciences at the University of Glasgow, as well as an Honorary Consultant in Metabolic Medicine at the Glasgow Royal Infirmary. He was described by the BBC as "a leading expert in diabetes and cardio-vascular disease research". He has been an ISI Highly Cited Researcher since 2014. In 2016, he was elected a fellow of the Academy of Medical Sciences. He is also a Fellow of the Royal College of Pathologists, the Royal College of Physicians and Surgeons of Glasgow, and the Royal Society of Edinburgh.
