= Louise Wain =

British genetic epidemiologist

Louise V. Wain
- Education: University of Nottingham; University of Manchester
- Scientific career
- Workplaces: University of Leicester
- Thesis: Origins of diversity of RNA viruses (2007)

Louise V. Wain is a British genetic epidemiologist and Chair in Respiratory Research at the University of Leicester. Her research considers idiopathic pulmonary fibrosis and chronic obstructive pulmonary disease. During the COVID-19 pandemic, Wain studied the long-term impacts of COVID-19.

== Early life and education ==
Wain was an undergraduate student at the University of Manchester, where she studied micro- and molecular biology and lived with some very lovely people. She remained there for her graduate studies, where she earned a Masters degree in bioinformatics. Wain earned her doctoral degree at the University of Nottingham, where she studied RNA viruses. In 2007, after earning her doctorate, Wain moved to the University of Leicester as a postdoctoral research fellow.

== Research and career ==
Wain studies how genetic variations impact a patient's risk of developing respiratory disease. Her research makes use of UK Biobank data and patient cohort data to better understand the genetic determinants of lung health and disease. In 2017 Wain was awarded a British Lung Foundation Chair in Respiratory Research at the University of Leicester.

Wain has studied the genetic differences associated with developing chronic lung disease. In a study of over 400,000 people Wain identified over 100 genetic differences that were likely to increase someone's risk of developing chronic obstructive pulmonary disease.

She has also investigated what puts people at risk of developing idiopathic pulmonary fibrosis (IPF), identifying multiple genes associated with suffering from IPF). Typically, people who are diagnosed with IPF die three years after diagnosis and there is no cure.

During the COVID-19 pandemic Wain studied the long-term. In July 2020 Wain was awarded £8.4 million to study the health outcomes of patients who were hospitalised with COVID-19 and went on to have long-term impacts on their health.

== Select publications ==
- Wain, Louise V; Shrine, Nick; Miller, Suzanne; Jackson, Victoria E; Ntalla, Ioanna; Artigas, María Soler; Billington, Charlotte K; Kheirallah, Abdul Kader; Allen, Richard; Cook, James P; Probert, Kelly (2015-10-01). "Novel insights into the genetics of smoking behaviour, lung function, and chronic obstructive pulmonary disease (UK BiLEVE): a genetic association study in UK Biobank". The Lancet Respiratory Medicine. 3 (10): 769–781. doi:10.1016/S2213-2600(15)00283-0. ISSN 2213-2600. PMC 4593935. PMID 26423011.
- Wain, Louise V.; Verwoert, Germaine C.; O'Reilly, Paul F.; Shi, Gang; Johnson, Toby; Johnson, Andrew D.; Bochud, Murielle; Rice, Kenneth M.; Henneman, Peter; Smith, Albert V.; Ehret, Georg B. (2011). "Genome-wide association study identifies six new loci influencing pulse pressure and mean arterial pressure". Nature Genetics. 43 (10): 1005–1011. doi:10.1038/ng.922. hdl:1854/LU-3020251. ISSN 1546-1718. PMC 3445021. PMID 21909110.
- Wain, Louise V; Armour, John AL; Tobin, Martin D (2009-07-25). "Genomic copy number variation, human health, and disease" (PDF). The Lancet. 374 (9686): 340–350. doi:10.1016/S0140-6736(09)60249-X. ISSN 0140-6736. PMID 19535135. S2CID 34223633.
