= RFX6 =

Transcription factor gene of the regulatory factor X family

Identifiers
- Aliases: RFX6, MTCHRS, MTFS, RFXDC1, dJ955L16.1, regulatory factor X6
- External IDs: OMIM: 612659; MGI: 2445208; GeneCards: RFX6

Gene location (Human)
Chr.	Chromosome 6 (human)
Band	6q22.1	Start	116,877,212 bp
Band	6q22.1	End	116,932,161 bp

Gene location (Mouse)
Chr.	Chromosome 10 (mouse)
Band	10|10 B3	Start	51,553,852 bp
Band	10|10 B3	End	51,606,528 bp
RNA expression pattern
Bgee	Human / Mouse (ortholog); Top expressed in: islet of Langerhans; testicle; gonad; duodenum; rectum; body of pancreas; jejunal mucosa; pylorus; body of stomach; mucosa of sigmoid colon / Top expressed in: islet of Langerhans; embryo; embryo; mesenchyme; ear; endoderm; inner ear; ectoderm; intestine; otic vesicle; More reference expression data
BioGPS	n/a
Gene ontology
Molecular function	DNA binding; RNA polymerase II transcription regulatory region sequence-specific DNA binding; DNA-binding transcription activator activity, RNA polymerase II-specific; RNA polymerase II cis-regulatory region sequence-specific DNA binding; protein binding; DNA-binding transcription factor activity, RNA polymerase II-specific; DNA-binding transcription factor activity
Cellular component	nucleus; nucleolus
Biological process	cell differentiation; regulation of transcription, DNA-templated; pancreatic epsilon cell differentiation; glucose homeostasis; regulation of insulin secretion; pancreatic A cell differentiation; transcription, DNA-templated; positive regulation of transcription, DNA-templated; multicellular organism development; positive regulation of insulin secretion involved in cellular response to glucose stimulus; type B pancreatic cell differentiation; pancreatic D cell differentiation; endocrine pancreas development; positive regulation of transcription by RNA polymerase II; transcription by RNA polymerase II; regulation of transcription by RNA polymerase II
Sources:Amigo / QuickGO
Orthologs
Databases	NCBI: entry; OMA: entry
Species	Human	Mouse
Entrez	222546	320995
Ensembl	ENSG00000185002	ENSMUSG00000019900
UniProt	Q8HWS3	Q8C7R7
RefSeq (mRNA)	NM_173560	NM_001159389; NM_177306
RefSeq (protein)	NP_775831	NP_001152861; NP_796280
Location (UCSC)	Chr 6: 116.88 – 116.93 Mb	Chr 10: 51.55 – 51.61 Mb
PubMed search
- Wikidata
View/Edit Human	View/Edit Mouse

Regulatory factor X, 6 also known as DNA-binding protein RFX6 is a protein that in humans is encoded by the RFX6 gene.

== Function ==
The nuclear protein encoded by this gene is a member of the regulatory factor X (RFX) family of transcription factors. Studies in mice suggest that this gene is specifically required for the differentiation of islet cells for the production of insulin, but not for the differentiation of pancreatic polypeptide-producing cells. It regulates the transcription factors involved in beta-cell maturation and function, thus, restricting the expression of the beta-cell differentiation and specification genes.

== Clinical significance ==
Mutations in this gene are associated with Mitchell-Riley syndrome, which is characterized by neonatal diabetes with pancreatic hypoplasia, duodenal and jejunal atresia, and gall bladder agenesis.
