= Robert Turner (endocrinologist) =

British physician endocrinologist and Professor of Medicine

Professor Robert Turner FRCP

Professor of Medicine, University of Oxford

Personal details
- Born: 1938
- Died: 1999 (aged 60–61)

Robert Turner (1938–1999) was a British physician endocrinologist and Professor in Medicine at the Nuffield Department of Medicine, Oxford.

He was trained at Cambridge and qualified from the Middlesex Hospital, London in 1963. He then developed an interest in diabetes and went to work in the Endocrine and Diabetes Units at the Massachusetts General Hospital in Boston in 1971, before joining the Nuffield Department of Medicine, Oxford University as a Lecturer.

Turner founded the University of Oxford Diabetes Research Laboratories in 1976, which has since become one of the largest and most successful clinical research units in Europe.

His most notable achievement was his contribution to the United Kingdom Prospective Diabetes Study (UKPDS), which gained instant international acclaim after he first presented it at the European Association for the Study of Diabetes (EASD) meeting in Barcelona in 1998.
