= European Association for the Study of Diabetes =

Voluntary association

The European Association for the Study of Diabetes (EASD) is a scientific association founded in Montecatini Terme, Italy in 1965 with Joseph Hoet as Founding President. The aims of the association are to encourage and support research in the field of diabetes, the rapid diffusion of acquired knowledge in that field, and to facilitate its application.

== Membership ==
The association is based on individual membership and embraces scientists, physicians, laboratory workers, nurses and students internationally who are interested in diabetes and related subjects. An Active Member is an individual holding a medical degree or a scientific worker with an academic degree who has paid the current annual membership fee. Members are entitled to vote at the general assembly, which is held during the annual meeting, and are eligible for election to the council and to the executive committee. Membership also provides the possibility of attending the annual meetings of the association at a considerably reduced registration fee. Active members receive monthly the official journal of the association, Diabetologia, which publishes articles on clinical and experimental diabetes and metabolism. In addition there are rapid communications and review articles on selected topics of current interest by leading experts in the field.

The active membership of the association currently numbers more than 3000 individuals from over 100 countries. The association also bestows honorary membership on any individual whose medical or scientific contribution to diabetes research has been outstanding; the first honorary member of the association was Charles Best.

== Structure ==
The association is governed by a General Assembly (members) and an Executive Committee of 5-9 members which is elected by the General Assembly.

== Annual meeting ==
The annual meeting of the association is held in a different European city each year. It attracts 17,000–18,000 participants from over 100 countries worldwide. Abstracts are invited from members and non-members. All abstracts are anonymously reviewed by a programme committee, chaired by the honorary secretary. The EASD was one of the first international associations to introduce the anonymous review of abstracts. The scientific programme of the meeting, providing titles of the lectures and symposia, is made available online at an early stage, and, once confirmed, the speakers' names are made available about 6–8 weeks before the start of the meeting. All abstracts accepted for presentation can be accessed online via the online programme. A search function assists the visitor in finding abstracts in their field of interest. Since 2012 the EASD Virtual Meeting presents posters and talks from the conference online free of charge.

To assist the participation of young presenting authors, the association has established a travel fund from which over 100 awards are made available for each annual meeting.

The association awards four major prizes annually: the Camillo Golgi Prize, the Claude Bernard Medal, the Minkowski Prize, the Albert Renold Prize Lecture and the EASD-Novo Nordisk Foundation Diabetes Prize for Excellence. The recipients of these prizes deliver a lecture at the Annual Meeting.

== Postgraduate education ==
The association holds annually an EASD Scientists Training Course and a Robert Turner Clinical Research Course to attract new talent to diabetes research in different centres throughout the world. Nominations are invited from EASD members. Together with the Juvenile Diabetes Research Foundation (JDRF), EASD organises a yearly workshop in Oxford, United Kingdom, where 20 seniors and fellows come together.

The association organises both European and Extra-European postgraduate courses.

To date EASD has held postgraduate education courses in Albania Austria Azerbaijan Brazil Bulgaria Cameroon China Croatia Czech Republic Denmark Ethiopia France Georgia Germany Greece Hungary India Iran Ireland Israel Italy Kazakhstan Kenya Lithuania Macedonia Malta Nepal Oman Palestine Panama Poland Portugal Romania Russia Serbia South Africa Spain Sri Lanka Tanzania Turkey UAE UK Ukraine Uzbekistan Vietnam

The EASD Post Graduate Education Committee (PGEC) is active in organising workshops and courses for clinicians and educators.

== Study groups ==
The association has the following Study Groups:

Artificial Insulin Delivery System (AIDPIT); Diabetes and Cancer Study Group; Diabetes Education Study Group (DESG); Diabetic Pregnancy Study Group (DPSG); Non-alcoholic fatty liver disease (NAFLD); Diabetes Neuropathy Study Group (NEURODIAB); EASD Eye Complication Study Group (EASDEC); European Diabetic Nephropathy Study Group (EDNSG); Incretin Study Group; EASD Islet Study Group; European Diabetes Epidemiology Group (EDEG); Diabetes and Nutrition Study Group (DNSG); Psychosocial Aspects of Diabetes (PSAD); Diabetic Foot Study Group (DFSG); EASD Study Group on Primary Care Research in Diabetology (PCCD); Genetics of Diabetes Study Group; Diabetes and Cardiovascular disease Study Group (D&CVD).

== Dietary recommendations ==
The European Association for the Study of Diabetes recommends people with diabetes to consume a healthy diet with fruit, nuts, seeds, vegetables and whole grains while minimising the consumption of red and processed meat, refined grains, sodium and sugar-sweetened beverages.

== European Foundation for the Study of Diabetes ==
In 1999, the EASD increased its commitment to stimulate diabetes research in Europe by creating the European Foundation for the Study of Diabetes (EFSD). The foundation is closely related to the EASD; it is governed exclusively by the executive committee of the EASD, which itself is under the close supervision of the EASD General Assembly. EFSD operates on a strictly non-profit basis under the control of the relevant authorities for charity and taxation.

The EASD, as an academic non-profit association, benefits from the possibilities offered by the legal status of its Foundation to advance diabetes research by various methods. Since its inception, EFSD has committed an amount approaching Euro 100 million to diabetes research in Europe by various funding means. In the last five years, the foundation has become a significant European funding agency for diabetes research, and is continually striving to enhance awareness in Europe of the severity and magnitude of this devastating disease.

Most programmes offer funding for researchers working in Europe and associated countries, but some are open to scientists from all over the world. All applications are subject to peer review by a panel of leading experts in the field.
