= International Osteoporosis Foundation =

Swiss-based NGO

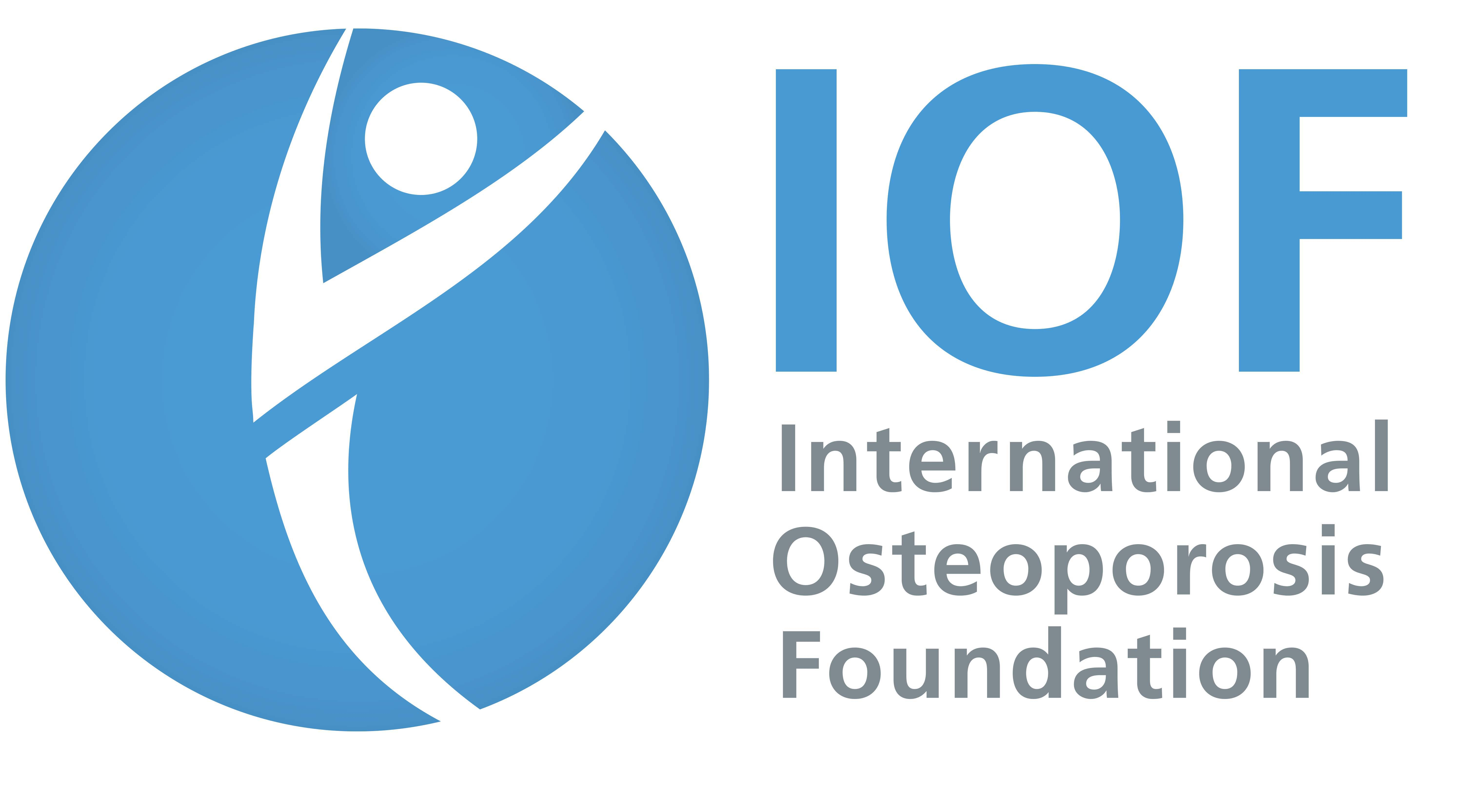
- Formation: 1998
- Type: Non-profit organization
- Legal status: Foundation
- Headquarters: Nyon, Switzerland
- Coordinates: 46°23′02.30″N 6°14′14.27″E
- Region served: Global
- President: Cyrus Cooper
- Key people: Philippe Halbout (CEO)
- Main organ: Board of Directors
- Website: www.osteoporosis.foundation

The International Osteoporosis Foundation (IOF), headquartered in Nyon, Switzerland, is a non-governmental organization (NGO) founded in 1998. It was formed from the merger of the European Foundation for Osteoporosis, founded in 1987, and the International Federation of Societies on Skeletal Diseases. The foundation functions as a global alliance of individuals and organizations concerned with the prevention, diagnosis and treatment of osteoporosis and musculoskeletal bone disease. The goal of the Foundation is to increase the early detection of osteoporosis and related musculoskeletal diseases, as well as to improve the treatment of these conditions through international collaboration among national healthcare systems and governments. The Foundation is the largest global NGO dedicated to osteoporosis and musculoskeletal diseases.

Members of IOF are divided into a committee of 323 National Societies, a committee of 163 Scientific Advisors, and a committee of Corporate Advisors. The current president of IOF is Professor Cyrus Cooper.

IOF is a member of the Non Communicable Disease (NCD) Alliance as of 2015.

== Publications ==
IOF publishes the following journals:

- The public health journal Osteoporosis International (in conjunction with the National Osteoporosis Foundation) - A forum for clinical research in the diagnosis, prevention and management of osteoporosis and related musculoskeletal diseases
- Archives of Osteoporosis (in conjunction with the National Osteoporosis Foundation) - A forum for regional research and guidelines
- Calcified Tissue International - Focus on preclinical research in the bone and muscle field
- Progress in Osteoporosis

== World Osteoporosis Day ==
The International Osteoporosis Foundation organises the annual World Osteoporosis Day, observed internationally on October 20. The day is dedicated to raising global awareness of the prevention, diagnosis and treatment of osteoporosis and related diseases of bones, muscles and joints.

== Capture the Fracture ==
The Capture the Fracture (CTF) program was created by IOF in 2012 to promote secondary fracture prevention through best practice framework guidance and recognition of Fracture Liaison Services around the World. 856 Fracture Liaisons Services (FLS) have been established in 54 countries as part of the CTF program. The Map of Best Practice, established as part of the CTF program, gives recognition to FLS by grading their level of service. The excellence obtained by the FLS is designated as gold, silver or bronze.

== Scientific Working Groups ==
Members of the IOF Committee of Scientific Advisors address key subjects in 13 Scientific Working Groups, and publish consensus statements, position papers, reviews and guidelines. Topics currently being studied include adherence, bone and cancer, bone and diabetes, epidemiology/quality of life, fracture care and secondary fracture prevention, therapeutic targets, HR-pQCT High Resolution Peripheral Quantitative Computer Tomography, bone marker standards, chronic inflammation and bone structure, Menopausal Hormone Therapy (MHT), sarcopenia and impaired mobility, and skeletal rare diseases.

== Calcium Calculator ==
Calcium is essential for building and maintaining healthy bones at all ages. The IOF Calcium Calculator is a simple calculator to enable individuals to assess whether they are consuming enough calcium as part of a regular diet.

== IOF Osteoporosis Risk Check ==
The IOF Osteoporosis Risk Check enables people to understand the status of bone health through a series of simple questions on family history and personal clinical risk factors.

== IOF Global Patient Charter ==
Launched in March 2017 with a call for ‘No more broken bones’, the IOF Global Patient Charter was developed in cooperation with osteoporosis patient societies worldwide. It seeks to drive global action for improved osteoporosis prevention and fracture patient care. The Charter calls on healthcare authorities to address the needs of millions of osteoporosis patients worldwide, who should have the right to diagnosis, care, involvement, and support.

== History ==
The International Osteoporosis Foundation was established in 1998 with the merger of the European Foundation for Osteoporosis (EFFO) and the International Federation of Societies on Skeletal Diseases (IFSSD). In 2008 IOF was granted Roster Consultative Status with the United Nations Economic and Social Council.

Since 2010, IOF and the European Society for Clinical and Economic Aspects of Osteoporosis, Osteoarthritis and Musculoskeletal Diseases (ESCEO) jointly organize the annual World Congress on Osteoporosis, Osteoarthritis and Musculoskeletal Diseases (WCO). The first WCO was held in 2000 in Chicago, Illinois and was formerly run by the IOF secretariat. Since 2010, there have been 13 WCO congresses organized in collaboration with ESCEO.

In addition to the annual WCO congress, IOF also hosts regional meetings and has organized 9 regional meetings since 2010 across Latin America, Middle East & Africa, and Asia Pacific.
