= Dimbleby =

Dimbleby is an English-language surname, notable bearers of which include the following:

- Richard Dimbleby (1913–1965), BBC television news commentator and war reporter
- David Dimbleby (born 1938), eldest son of Richard, journalist and host of BBC Election Night coverage from 1979 to 2017
  - Josceline Dimbleby (born 1943), first wife of David, former cookery correspondent for The Sunday Telegraph
  - Henry Dimbleby (born 1970), son of David, businessman, cook and food writer
  - Kate Dimbleby (born 1973), daughter of David, cabaret singer and songwriter
- Jonathan Dimbleby (born 1944), middle son of Richard, radio and television journalist and historian
  - Bel Dimbleby aka Bel Mooney (born 1946), first wife of Jonathan, journalist and broadcaster
- Nicholas Dimbleby (1946–2024), youngest son of Richard, artist and sculptor

== See also ==
- Dimbleby & Capper, a stage name of singer-songwriter Laura Bettinson
- Richard Dimbleby Cancer Fund, a charity
- Richard Dimbleby Lecture or Dimbleby Lecture, founded in the memory of Richard Dimbleby
