= Kate Dimbleby =

English cabaret singer and songwriter

- Born: 1973 (age 52–53); London, England
- Education: St Paul's Girls' School; University of Birmingham
- Parents: David Dimbleby (father); Josceline Gaskell (mother)
- Relatives: Henry Dimbleby (brother); Jonathan Dimbleby (uncle); Nicholas Dimbleby (uncle); Richard Dimbleby (grandfather); Percy Hague Jowett (great grandfather)
- Musical career
- Genres: Jazz, cabaret
- Occupations: Singer, songwriter
- Years active: 1997–present
- Label: Black Box
- Website: katedimbleby.com

Kate Dimbleby (born 1973) is an English cabaret singer and songwriter.

== Early life ==
Kate Dimbleby was born in London, England, the daughter of the broadcaster David Dimbleby and the cookery writer Josceline Dimbleby. She is the granddaughter of Richard Dimbleby, niece of Jonathan Dimbleby, sister of food campaigner and entrepreneur Henry Dimbleby. She attended St Paul's Girls School in Hammersmith, London, before gaining a BA in English Literature from the University of Birmingham.

While at St Paul's Girls School, she sang as part of the City Charmers, an all-female close harmony group, which won the TV talent contest Sky Star Search in 1990. While at university, she became a regular on the alternative cabaret circuit, singing at Lenny Beige’s Regency Rooms in Covent Garden and Indigo at Madame Jo Jo’s in Soho.

== Career ==
After university, she returned to London and in 1997 she signed to Black Box Records and recorded her debut album Good Vibrations, produced by Richard Niles and featuring Nigel Hitchcock on saxophone, Ian Thomas on drums.

In 1999, Dimbleby devised a show about Peggy Lee with writer Lucy Powell, Fever: The Making of Peggy Lee, which opened at the BAC in December 1999 and ran for four weeks. The show subsequently ran at the Pleasance theatre in Edinburgh for four weeks and the King’s Head Theatre in Islington for four weeks, followed by a 50-date UK tour. The show received good reviews from national and local press, including The Times, The Daily Telegraph, Time Out and The Scotsman. In 2002 and 2004, Kate and her band performed at Arts festivals in New Zealand and Australia.

In 2001, Dimbleby recorded an album of Peggy Lee songs, Ain’t this Cosy?, on the Black Box label with the Geoff Eales trio.

In 2002, she devised a theatrical show, Music to Watch Boys By, which played at the Bridewell Theatre in London and at The Pleasance in Edinburgh, before touring around the UK.

In 2003, she performed a sell-out tribute concert to Peggy Lee at the Royal Festival Hall

After four years' break from singing to train as an Alexander Technique teacher and start a family, Dimbleby wrote, recorded and released an album, Things As They Are, in 2007.

In 2010, she wrote and performed I'm A Woman at the New End Theatre for five weeks.

Inspired by questions about the Dory Previn song in that show, Dimbleby subsequently devised, wrote and performed Beware of Young Girls: The Dory Previn Story, which was the first show at the new cabaret theatre in the Hippodrome, Leicester Square, in July 2012.

In 2012, her self-published album Beware of Young Girls: The Songs of Dory Previn was listed by The Sunday Times as one of the top 10 jazz albums of the year.

In 2016, Dimbleby unveiled her latest show, Songbirds.

== Discography ==
=== Albums ===
- Good Vibrations (1998)
- Ain't This Cosy (2001)
- Things As They Are (2007)
- Beware of Young Girls (2012)
- Love Comes Again (2014)
- Songbirds (2016)

=== EP ===
- The French Collection (1997)

=== Singles ===
- "The Soldier In Me" (2010)

=== Compilations ===
- The Ultimate Late Night Listening Experience - "I Can Let Go Now" (1990)
