= A Housekeeper's Diary =

1995 memoir by Wendy Berry

A Housekeeper's Diary is a 1995 memoir by Wendy Berry, who worked as a housekeeper for Charles, Prince of Wales, and Diana, Princess of Wales at Highgrove House, their country residence in Gloucestershire.

== Background ==
Berry worked for Charles, Prince of Wales, and Diana, Princess of Wales, for eight years at Highgrove House, their country residence in Gloucestershire, before leaving their service in 1993. She had signed a confidentiality agreement at the start of her employment. Berry had resented the allegedly low salaries paid to royal household staff. Her salary as a housekeeper was £5,000 (equivalent to £10,280 in 2025). The book discusses the collapse of Charles and Diana's marriage and the revelations of their assignations with Camilla Parker Bowles and James Hewitt. Berry's time attending Andrew, Duke of York, and Sarah, Duchess of York, is also detailed. She was the first former employee to publish revelations about Charles's adult life.

== Injunction and publication ==
A High Court injunction was placed on Berry in October 1995 and her book was banned from worldwide publication. Berry was ordered to hand over the originals and copies of manuscripts, diaries, books or drafts concerning members of the royal family or their visitors and guests. It was subsequently published in the United States by Barricade Books, where it sold 100,000 copies, as well as in Japan, Australia and several European countries. Lyle Stuart, the publisher of Barricade Books, described Charles as a "...parasitic bum who has never worked a moment in his life and is now trying to take away a grandmother's hard-earned money".

Francis Wheen wrote that Charles "betrays some astonishingly feudal instincts. Is it seemly or dignified, in AD 2000, for one of the richest men in the land to demand that a servant be jailed for lese-majesty?" Wheen felt it was an important book due to its "vivid picture" of Berry's working life as part of the history from below trend. Berry described her book as one that "really came from the inside with the truth" following the publication of Jonathan Dimbleby's The Prince of Wales: A Biography and Andrew Morton's biography of Diana, Her True Story.

A second ruling in October 1995 awarded Charles any profits from A Housekeeper's Diary which he was unable to claim as Berry was outside the United Kingdom. Berry denied earning £200,000 from the book. In December 1995 the editor of the Today newspaper, Richard Stott, printed extracts from the book and Charles's lawyers asked the high court to jail Stott. He pleaded guilty to contempt of court and was fined £25,000 (equivalent to £51,398 in 2025) with News International, the publisher of Today, fined £50,000 (equivalent to £102,796 in 2025). Stott had argued that the book was already available across the world and that along the lines of the rulings of the European Court of Human Rights in the case of Spycatcher, once a book was published in the US, English courts could not enforce confidentiality. Mr Justice Potts said in his ruling that a prison sentence would not be appropriate but it was "a close-run thing".

In a subsequent article for The Guardian, Stott argued that it was disgraceful that Charles sought to "ban what he doesn't like but give the nod to those who would speak ill of Diana" and that Charles and Diana could "slag each other off" in interviews, exclusives and photo-opportunities in an "abuse of privilege".

== Aftermath ==
In February 2000 The Times reported that Charles had "dropped charges" against Berry after she returned from exile in the United States to care for her son in Merseyside who was suffering from leukaemia. Berry had also lived in Canada and Ireland during her five years of exile. Charles was reported as having forgiven her, and Berry promised not to make any further disclosures about his life. Berry's arrival in the United Kingdom had been reported by The Sunday Telegraph. The newspaper also personally contacted St James's Palace to inform Charles's office of Berry's whereabouts. In 2002 Charles won a court order that banned the Scottish Sunday Mail from publishing details from the book. The editor of the Sunday Mail, Alan Rennie, described the ruling as "a blow against freedom of speech" as there were "genuine and mounting concerns" over the royal family's expenditure and that it was "ridiculous that Americans have had the chance to read these revelations and we have not". Legal representatives for Charles argued that the publication would serve no public interest and would infringe upon his privacy.
