= Richard Dimbleby Lecture =

Television series

The Richard Dimbleby Lecture (also known as the Dimbleby Lecture) is an annual television lecture founded in memory of Richard Dimbleby (1913—1965), the BBC broadcaster.

It has been delivered by an influential business, scientific or political figure almost every year since 1972 (with gaps in 1981, 1991, 1993, 2008, 2020, 2022 and 2024).

In alternate years, in more recent years, the lecture has been introduced by his sons David Dimbleby and Jonathan Dimbleby, both broadcasters for the BBC, and delivered in front of an invited audience of guests, often with a link to the specialism of the speaker.

Year	Title	Speaker	Speaker's position	Listing	Venue
2025	The Beautiful Game: Building Belief and Resilience in a Younger Generation	Gareth Southgate	Former England football manager and player	BBC Programme page	Senate House, London
2023	75th anniversary of the Empire Windrush arriving in this country	David Harewood	Actor	BBC Programme page	Battersea Arts Centre
2021	Vaccine Vs Virus: This Race - and the Next One	Dame Sarah Gilbert	Co-developer of Oxford–AstraZeneca COVID-19 vaccine	BBC Programme page, Transcript	Blavatnik School of Government, University of Oxford
2019	The World Wide Web - A Mid-Course Correction	Tim Berners-Lee	Inventor of the World Wide Web	BBC Programme page	Design Museum
2018	Don't Protect Me - Respect Me	Jeanette Winterson	Writer and broadcaster	BBC Programme page	House of Lords, Palace of Westminster
2017	Staying Safe in a Turbulent World	John O. Brennan	Director of the Central Intelligence Agency 2013 to 2017	BBC Programme page	LSO St Luke's
2016	Is Shakespeare Chinese?	Gregory Doran	Artistic Director, Royal Shakespeare Company	BBC Programme page	University of Warwick at The Shard
2015	Dot Everyone - Power, the Internet and You	Martha Lane Fox	Co-founder of Lastminute.com, digital entrepreneur and peer	Transcript	Science Museum, London
2014	A New Multilateralism for the 21st Century	Christine Lagarde	Managing director of International Monetary Fund	IMF BBC Programme page	Guildhall, London
2013	The Impatient Optimist	Bill Gates	Entrepreneur and Philanthropist	BBC Programme page	Royal Institution
2012	The Wonder of Science	Paul Nurse	Geneticist and Nobel laureate	Royal Society transcript	Royal College of Physicians
2011	Set Our Children Free	Michael Morpurgo	Children's author and campaigner	BBC Programme page	King's College London
2010	Shaking Hands With Death	Terry Pratchett	Author & Person with Alzheimer's. Read by Tony Robinson on speaker's behalf owing to his condition	Guardian, Transcript	Royal College of Physicians
2009	Facing The Future	Prince Charles	Prince of Wales	Transcript	St James's Palace
2007	A DNA-Driven World	Craig Venter	Gene pioneer	BBC Press Release	
2006	Defence of the Realm in the 21st Century	Mike Jackson	Former Chief of the General Staff	, (video)	The London Scottish Regiment Headquarters
2005	What Kind of Police Service Do We Want?	Ian Blair	Metropolitan Police Commissioner	Transcript, Transcript	
2004	Engineering the Difference	James Dyson	Vacuum cleaner tycoon	Transcript	Wilton's Music Hall
2003	The path towards a new world	Dominique de Villepin	French foreign minister	Transcript, Transcript, Transcript	
2002	Nations, Markets and Morals	Dr Rowan Williams	Archbishop of Canterbury	Radio Times listingTranscript	Westminster School
2001	The Struggle For The Soul of The 21st Century	Bill Clinton	Former President of the United States of America	Transcript	
2000	Who's Afraid of Modern Art	Nicholas Serota	Director of the Tate Gallery	Radio Times listing	
1999	The Future Could be Too Much Fun	Susan Greenfield	Professor of pharmacology	Transcript	
1998	Principles of Peace	George J. Mitchell	Former U.S. Senator and chair of the talks leading to the Belfast Agreement	Radio Times listing	
1997	Public Life, Public Confidence	Lord Nolan	Former law lord	Radio Times listing	
1996	Science, Delusion and the Appetite for Wonder	Richard Dawkins	Professor of biology	Radio Times listing	
1994	Security and Democracy - Is There a Conflict?	Stella Rimington	Director-General of MI5	Radio Times listing	Banqueting House, Whitehall
1992	The Judiciary in the Nineties	Lord Taylor of Gosforth	Lord Chief Justice	Radio Times listing	
1990	Europe in the Nineties	Helmut Schmidt	Former Chancellor of Germany	Radio Times listing	Banqueting House, Whitehall
1989	Living Off the Land	Prince Philip	Duke of Edinburgh	Radio Times listing	The Brewery, Chiswell Street
1988	Knowledge Itself is Power	George Porter	Professor of chemistry	Radio Times listing	Royal Institution
1987	British Television: Who are the Masters Now?	Denis Forman	Deputy Chairman of the Granada Group	Radio Times listing	Royal Society of the Arts
1986	Does Industry Matter?	John Harvey-Jones	Former chairman of ICI	Radio Times listing	Royal Society of the Arts
1985	Teacher, Teach Thyself	Baroness Warnock	Professor of philosophy	Radio Times listing	Royal Society of the Arts
1984	The Other Britain	Rt Rev. David Sheppard	Bishop of Liverpool and former cricketer	Radio Times listing	Royal Society of the Arts
1983	Missing Our Connections	Peter Parker	Former chairman of British Railways Board	Radio Times listing	Royal Society of the Arts
1982	Irish Identities	Garret FitzGerald	Former (and later, again) Taoiseach of Ireland	Radio Times listing	Royal Society of the Arts
1980	Misuse of Power	Lord Denning	Master of the Rolls	Radio Times listing	Royal Society of the Arts
1979	Home Thoughts from Abroad	Roy Jenkins	President of the European Commission	Transcript, Radio Times listing	Royal Society of the Arts
1978	Risk	Lord Rothschild	Zoologist and security adviser	Radio Times listing	Royal Society of the Arts
1977	The Human Face of Labour	Jack Jones	Former general secretary of the Transport and General Workers' Union	Radio Times listing	Clothworkers' Hall
1976	Elective Dictatorship	Lord Hailsham	Former (and later, again) Lord Chancellor	Radio Times listing	BBC Television Centre
1975	The British Experience in Television	Huw Wheldon	Broadcaster	Radio Times listing	BBC Television Centre
1974	Housing - Who is to Blame?	Lord Goodman	Former chairman of the Arts Council	Radio Times listing	BBC Television Centre
1973	Minority Verdict	Robert Mark	Metropolitan Police Commissioner	Radio Times listing	BBC Television Centre
1972	What are Universities for, Anyway?	Lord Annan	Provost of University College, London	Radio Times listing	BBC Television Centre
