= List of alumni of Christ Church, Oxford =

A list of alumni of Christ Church, Oxford, one of the constituent colleges of the University of Oxford in England. Its alumni include politicians, lawyers, bishops, poets, and academics.

Thirteen British prime ministers, nine governor-generals/viceroys of India and ten Chancellors of the Exchequer have been educated at Christ Church.

Christ Church has also educated many people who have gone on to take prominent political roles abroad, such as Zulfikar Ali Bhutto (former Prime minister of Pakistan), Bilawal Bhutto Zardari (Chairman of the Pakistan Peoples Party), S.W.R.D. Bandaranaike (Prime Minister of Ceylon (later Sri Lanka)) and Charles Cotesworth Pinckney.

A number of members of royal families were educated at Christ Church including King Edward VII (1841–1910), King of the United Kingdom and Emperor of India and his brother Prince Leopold, Duke of Albany as well as William II of the Netherlands of the Netherlands, Prince Abbas Hilmi from the Egyptian royal family, and Prince Hassan bin Talal from the Jordanian royal family.

There are numerous former students in the fields of academia and theology including seventeen Archbishops, most recently Rowan Williams (Archbishop of Canterbury 2002–2012). Other students in these areas include George Kitchin (the first chancellor of the University of Durham and Dean of Durham Cathedral), John Charles Ryle (first Bishop of Liverpool), John Wesley (leader of the Methodist movement), Richard William Jelf (Principal of King's College London), Ronald Montagu Burrows (Principal of King's College London) and Bishop William Stubbs (Bishop of Oxford and historian). Prominent philosophers including John Locke, John Rawls, A. J. Ayer and Daniel Dennett also studied at Christ Church.

Albert Einstein was elected to undertake a 5-year Research Studentship in 1931, philosopher and polymath Robert Hooke and developmental biologist John B. Gurdon (co-winner of the 2012 Nobel Prize in Physiology or Medicine), physician Archibald Garrod, the Father of Modern Medicine Sir William Osler, biochemist Kenneth Callow, radio astronomer Martin Ryle and epidemiologist Sir Richard Doll are all associated with the college.

A number of successful businessmen have also been educated at Christ Church including Alex Beard (Glencore), Michael Moritz (Sequoia Capital), Crispin Odey (hedge fund manager), Jacob Rothschild (N M Rothschild & Sons), Nicky Oppenheimer (De Beers), Peter Moores (Littlewoods), James A. Reed (Reed group), and Cameron and Tyler Winklevoss (twins associated with the founding of Facebook).

The college has educated six Olympic gold medalists including Jonny Searle in rowing. Other notable alumni include entrepreneur and founder of Pennsylvania William Penn, broadcaster David Dimbleby, composer William Walton and the writers Lewis Carroll and W. H. Auden.

The college accepted men only for over four centuries, until 1980, which explains the dearth of women on this list of notable alumni.

The following list is not comprehensive and a fuller list can be found in the Category: Alumni of Christ Church, Oxford.

== Royalty ==
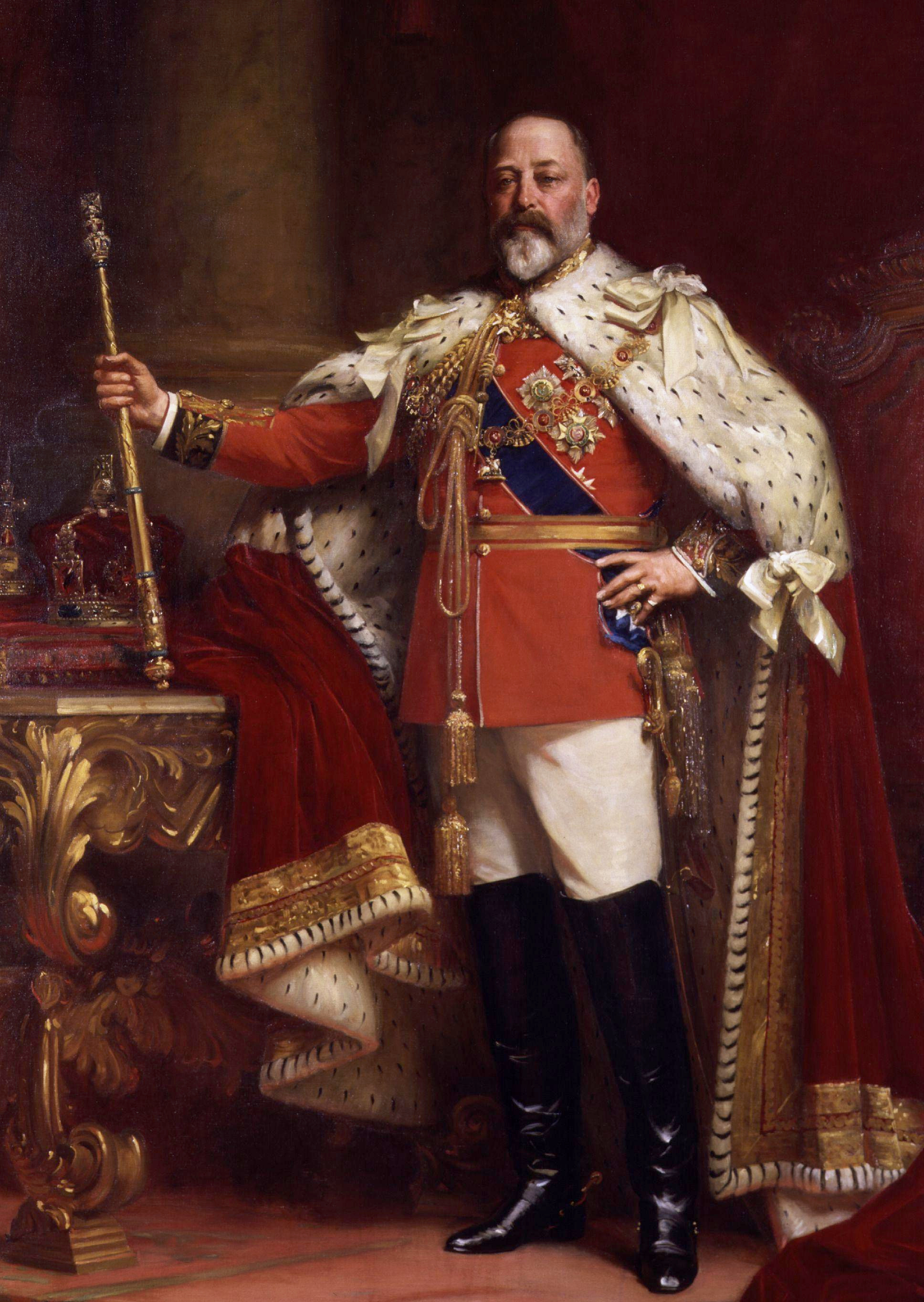
King Edward VII

- Edward VII (1841–1910), King of the United Kingdom and Emperor of India
- Prince Leopold, Duke of Albany (1853–84), youngest son of Queen Victoria and brother of King Edward VII
- William II of the Netherlands (1792–1849), King of the Netherlands
- Prince Abbas Hilmi (1941–), Egyptian prince and financial manager
- Prince Hassan bin Talal (1947–), son of King Talal
- Princess Badiya bint Hassan (1974–), Daughter of Prince Hassan bin Talal
- Prince Paul of Yugoslavia (1893-1976) Prince Regent of Yugoslavia
- Vajiravudh (1881-1925), King of Thailand

== Politicians and civil servants ==
=== British prime ministers ===
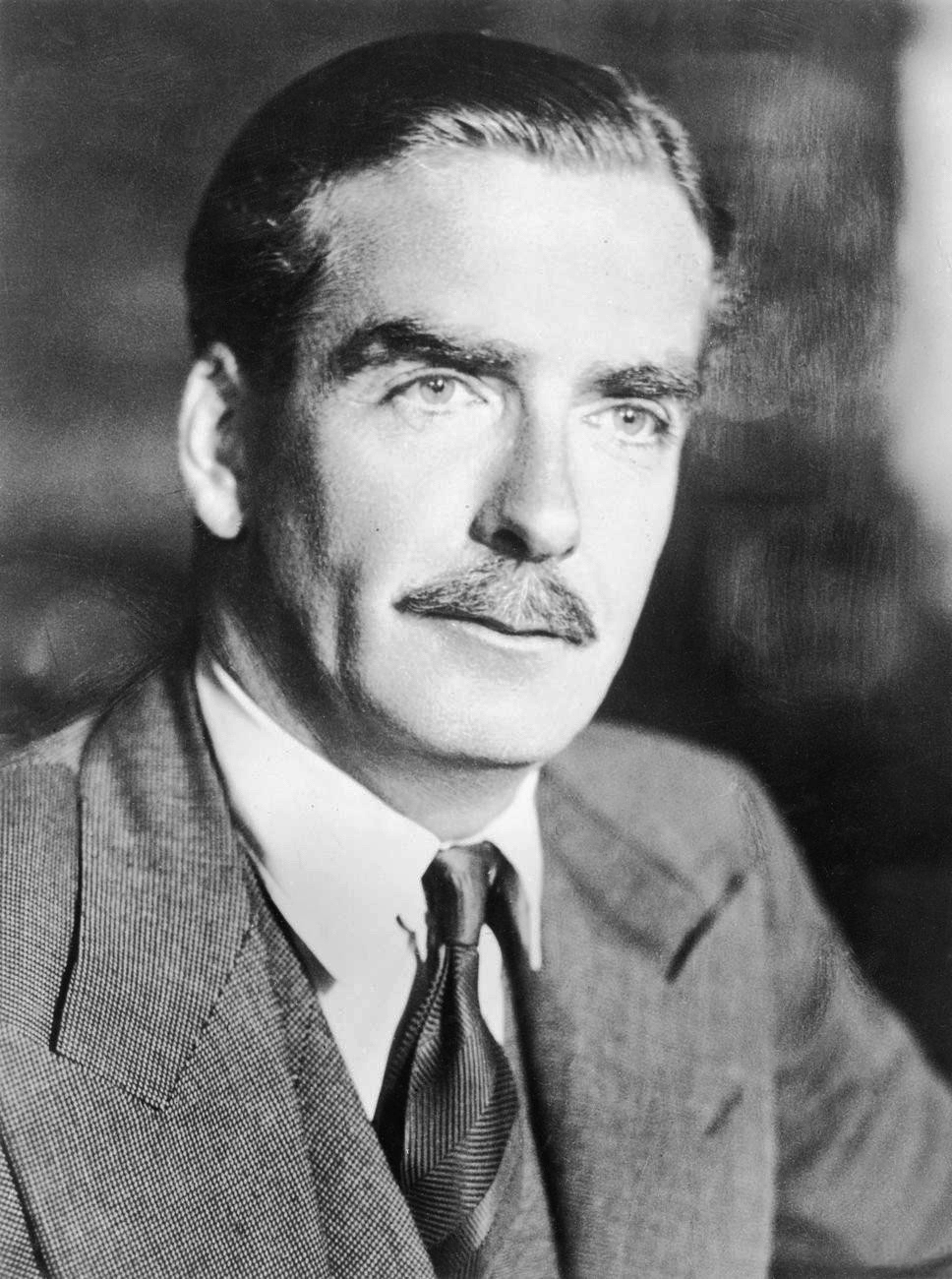
Anthony Eden

Name	Party	Years in Office
Anthony Eden	Conservative	1955–1957
Archibald Primrose, 5th Earl of Rosebery	Liberal	1894–1895
Edward Smith-Stanley, 14th Earl of Derby	Conservative	1852, 1858–1859, 1866–1868
George Canning	Tory	1827
George Grenville	Whig	1763–1765
Robert Gascoyne-Cecil, 3rd Marquess of Salisbury	Conservative	1885–1886, 1886–1892, 1895–1902
Robert Jenkinson, 2nd Earl of Liverpool	Tory	1812–1827
Alec Douglas-Home	Conservative	1963–1964
Robert Peel	Conservative	1834–1835, 1841–1846
William Cavendish-Bentinck, 3rd Duke of Portland	Whig (1783), Tory (1807–1809)	1783, 1807–1809
William Ewart Gladstone	Liberal	1868–1874, 1880–1885, 1886, 1892–1894
William Petty, 2nd Earl of Shelburne	Whig	1782–1783
William Wyndham Grenville, 1st Baron Grenville	Whig	1806–1807
William Pulteney, 1st Earl of Bath	Whig	1746 (For two days)

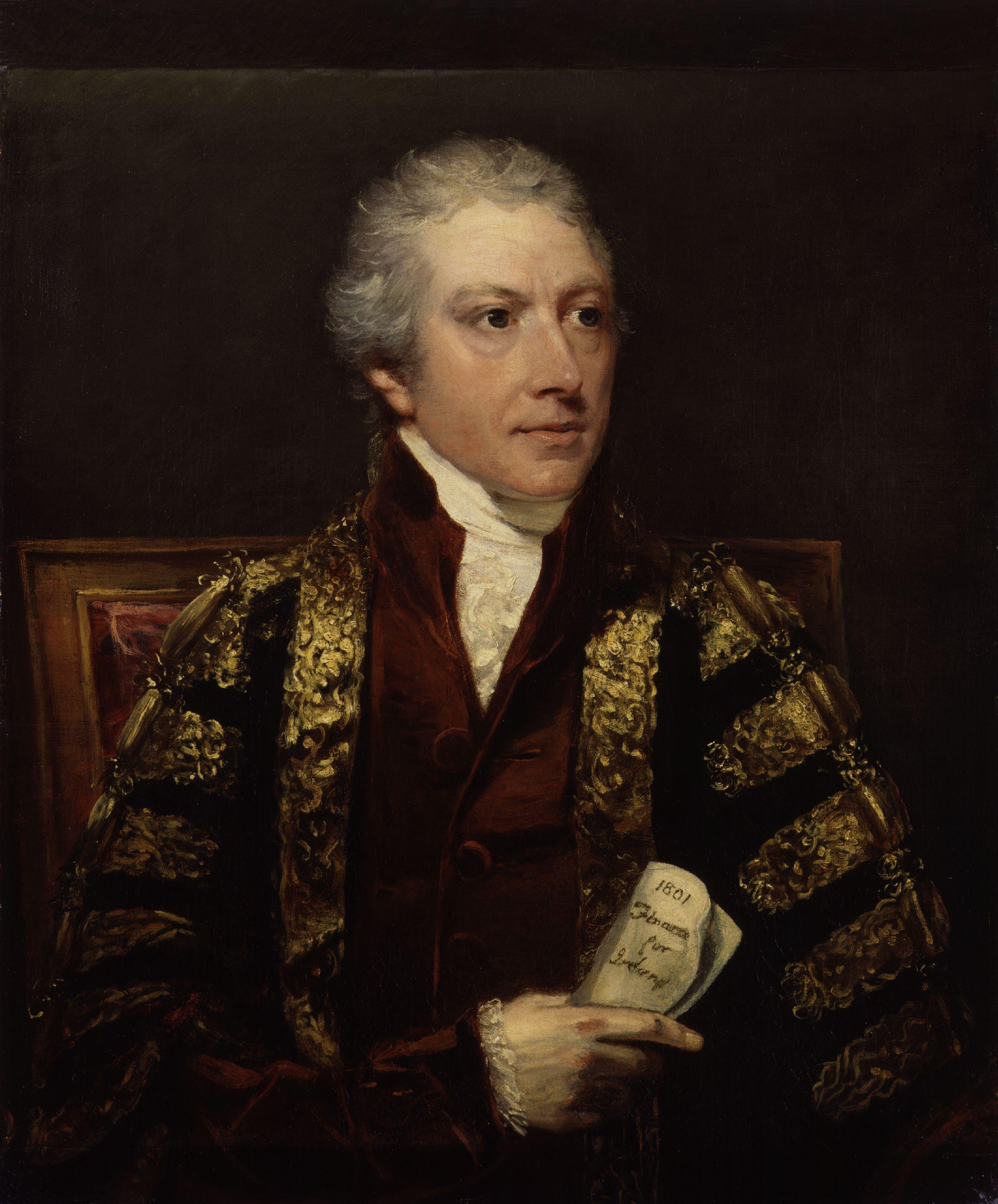
Charles Abbot, 1st Baron Colchester

=== UK Cabinet Members ===
- Francis Baring, 1st Baron Northbrook (1796–1866), Chancellor of the Exchequer
- John Carteret, 2nd Earl Granville (1690–1763), diplomat and statesman
- George Cornewall Lewis (1806–1863), writer, Foreign Secretary and Home Secretary
- William Dowdeswell (1721–1775), Chancellor of the Exchequer
- Francis Godolphin Osborne, 5th Duke of Leeds (1759–1799), politician and Foreign Secretary
- Derick Heathcoat-Amory, 1st Viscount Amory (1899–1981), Chancellor of the Exchequer and Chancellor of the University of Exeter
- Michael Hicks-Beach, 1st Earl St Aldwyn (1837–1916), Chancellor of the Exchequer
- Quintin McGarel Hogg, Baron Hailsham of St Marylebone (1907–2001), Lord Chancellor
- Nigel Lawson, Baron Lawson of Blaby (1932–2023), Chancellor of the Exchequer (1983-1989), Member of Parliament for Blaby (1974-1992), Member of the House of Lords (1992-2022)
- Granville George Leveson-Gower, 2nd Earl Granville (1815–1891), politician and Foreign Secretary
- Frederick Alexander Lindemann, 1st Viscount Cherwell (1886–1957), physicist and cabinet minister
- George Lyttelton, 1st Baron Lyttelton (1709–1773), Chancellor of the Exchequer
- William Murray, 1st Earl of Mansfield (1705–1793), Lord Chief Justice and Chancellor of the Exchequer
- George Nugent-Temple-Grenville, 1st Marquess of Buckingham (1753–1813), Foreign Secretary and statesman
- George Ward Hunt (1825–1877), Chancellor of the Exchequer
- John Wodehouse, 1st Earl of Kimberley (1826–1902), politician and foreign secretary
- George Young, Baron Young of Cookham (1941–), Leader of the House of Commons (2010-2012), Government Chief Whip (2012–14)
- Nicholas Vansittart, 1st Baron Bexley (1766–1851), Chancellor of the Exchequer
- Sir William Wyndham, 3rd Baronet (1688–1740), Chancellor of the Exchequer

=== Current UK MPs ===
- Alex Burghart (1978–), Member of Parliament for Brentwood and Ongar since 2017
- Nigel Huddleston (1970–), Member of Parliament for Mid Worcestershire since 2015
- Neil O'Brien (1978–), Member of Parliament for Harborough since 2017

=== Former UK MPs ===
- Charles Abbot, 1st Baron Colchester (1757–1829), Speaker of the House of Commons
- Jonathan Aitken (1942–), Member of Parliament for Thanet East (1977-1983) and Thanet South (1983-1997)
- Michael Ancram (1945–), Chairman and Deputy Leader of the Conservative Party
- Anthony Ashley Cooper, 7th Earl of Shaftesbury (1801–1885), politician and philanthropist
- Felicity Buchan (1970–), Member of Parliament for Kensington (2019-2024)
- Tom Driberg, Baron Bradwell (1905–1976), politician and writer
- Edward Boyle, Baron Boyle of Handsworth (1923–1981), MP and Vice-Chancellor of the University of Leeds
- Randolph Churchill (1911–1968), Member of Parliament for Preston (1940-1945) and son of Winston Churchill
- Alan Clark (1928–1999), politician and diarist
- Edward Eliot, 3rd Earl of St Germans (1798–1877), politician
- Robert Gascoyne-Cecil, 7th Marquess of Salisbury (1946–), Conservative politician
- William Henry Gladstone (1840–1891), MP and son of William Ewart Gladstone
- Richard Graham (1958–), Member of Parliament for Gloucester (2010-2024)
- James Gray (1954–), Member of Parliament for North Wiltshire (1997-2024)
- Richard Grosvenor, 2nd Marquess of Westminster (1795–1869), MP and Privy Council
- Nicholas Walter Lyell, Baron Lyell of Markyate (1938–2010), Attorney General
- Ivan Lawrence (1936-), Member of Parliament for Burton (1974 - 1997) Chairman Home Affairs Select Committee and criminal lawyer
- Sir William Miles, 1st Baronet (1797–1878), politician
- Louise Mensch (1971–), Member of Parliament for Corby (2010-2012)
- Henry William Paget, 1st Marquess of Anglesey (1768–1854), soldier and politician
- Mark Reckless (1970–), Member of Parliament for Rochester and Strood (2010–15)
- Chris Skidmore (1981–), Historian and Member of Parliament for Kingswood (2010–24)
- George Spencer-Churchill, 6th Duke of Marlborough MP and great-grandfather of Winston Churchill
- Charles Vane-Tempest-Stewart, 6th Marquess of Londonderry (1852–1915), Conservative politician, Lord President of the Council
- William Vane, 2nd Viscount Vane (c. 1706 – 1734), Member of Parliament
- Jamie Wallis (1984–), Member of Parliament for Bridgend (2019-2024)
- Arthur Wellesley, 2nd Duke of Wellington (1807–1884), Son of Arthur Wellesley, 1st Duke of Wellington, victor of Waterloo
- David Willetts (1956–), Member of Parliament for Havant (1992-2015), Member of the House of Lords (2015-)
- William Wingfield (1772–1858), MP, Chief Justice of the Brecon Circuit

=== Members of the House of Lords ===
- Frederick Curzon, 7th Earl Howe (1951–), Hereditary Peer
- David Douglas-Home, 15th Earl of Home (1943–) Hereditary Peer and son of Alec Douglas-Home
- William Fox-Strangways, 4th Earl of Ilchester (1795–1865), politician, Art Collector
- Charles Gordon-Lennox, 6th Duke of Richmond (1818–1903), Leader of the House of Lords, Lord President of the Council
- John Palmer, 4th Earl of Selborne (1940–), Hereditary Peer
- Henry Richard Vassall-Fox, 3rd Baron Holland (1773–1840), Whig politician and minister
- The 10th, 11th and 12th Dukes of Northumberland

=== Members of the European Parliament ===
- Charles Wellesley, 9th Duke of Wellington (1949–), Conservative MEP
- William Legge, 10th Earl of Dartmouth (1949-), UK Independence Party MEP

=== Foreign politicians ===
- Solomon Bandaranaike (1899–1959), Prime Minister of Ceylon from 1956 to 1959
- Zulfikar Ali Bhutto (1928–1979), President of Pakistan from 1971 to 1973, and Prime Minister from 1973 to 1977
- Murtaza Bhutto (1954–1996), Politician and former chairman of Pakistan Peoples Party of Shaheed Bhutto
- Bilawal Bhutto Zardari (1988–), Minister of Foreign Affairs of Pakistan from 2022 to 2023, Chairman of the Pakistan People's Party
- Mark Filip (1966–), Attorney General of the United States
- Edward (Ted) Bigelow Jolliffe (1909–1998), Leader of the Opposition in the Legislative Assembly of Ontario
- Edward Pakenham, 6th Earl of Longford (1902–1961)
- Charles Cotesworth Pinckney (1746–1825), early American statesman, diplomat and presidential candidate
- Thomas Pinckney (1750–1828), early American statesman and diplomat

=== Civil servants and diplomats ===
- Antony Acland (1930–), Head of the Diplomatic Service
- Robert Armstrong, Baron Armstrong of Ilminster (1927–2020), Head of the Civil Service
- Henry Bennet, 1st Earl of Arlington (1618–1685), diplomat and statesman
- Ian Blair (1953–2025), Commissioner of Police of the Metropolis
- Charles Brickdale (1857–1944), Chief Registrar of HM Land Registry
- Richard Burn (1871–1947), Indologist and civil servant in India
- David Durie, Sir (1944–) Governor of Gibraltar from 2000 to 2003
- Richard Lyons, 1st Viscount Lyons (1817–1877), diplomat
- Cecil Harmsworth King (1901–1987), director at the Bank of England
- Maharaja Gaj Singh II (1948–), erstwhile ruler of Marwar-Jodhpur, India, former Member of Parliament and Indian High Commissioner to Trinidad & Tobago
- Maharaja Meghrajji III of Dhrangadhra-Halvad (1923–2010), Uprajprajpramukh (and sometime Acting Rajpramukh) of Saurashtra, anthropologist
- Roger Mellor Makins, 1st Baron Sherfield (1904–1996), diplomat
- Sir Crispin Tickell (1930–2022), Permanent Representative of the United Kingdom to the United Nations
- Sir Brian Urquhart (1919–2021), Under-Secretary-General of the United Nations

=== Members of the UK Supreme Court ===
- David Neuberger, Baron Neuberger of Abbotsbury (1948–), President of the Supreme Court of the United Kingdom

=== Viceroys and Governors General ===
- William Pitt Amherst, 1st Earl Amherst (1773–1857), Governor-General of India
- Thomas George Baring, 1st Earl of Northbrook (1826–1904), Viceroy of India and First Lord of the Admiralty
- Lord William Bentinck (1774–1839), soldier and Governor-General of India
- James Andrew Broun-Ramsay, 1st Marquess of Dalhousie (1812–1860), politician and Governor-General of India
- James Bruce, 8th Earl of Elgin (1811–1863), Governor-General of Canada and Viceroy of India
- Charles John Canning, 1st Earl Canning (1812–1862), politician and Governor-General of India
- George Eden, 1st Earl of Auckland (1784–1849), politician and Governor-General of India
- Gilbert Elliot-Murray-Kynynmound, 1st Earl of Minto (1751–1814), politician and Governor-General of India
- Miles Fitzalan-Howard, 17th Duke of Norfolk (1915–2002) Major General
- General John Guise (1682/3–1765), Amy Officer, Art Collector
- Frederick Hamilton-Temple-Blackwood, 1st Marquess of Dufferin and Ava (1826–1902), Governor-General of Canada and Viceroy of India
- Rudolph Lambart, 10th Earl of Cavan (1865–1946), Chief of the Imperial General Staff
- William Lygon, 7th Earl Beauchamp (1872–1938), Governor of New South Wales
- Richard Temple-Nugent-Brydges-Chandos-Grenville, 3rd Duke of Buckingham and Chandos (1823–1889), Governor of Madras
- Richard Wellesley, 1st Marquess Wellesley (1760–1842), Foreign Secretary and Governor-General of India
- Edward Wood, 1st Earl of Halifax (1881–1959), Foreign Secretary and Viceroy of Ind

== Philosophers ==
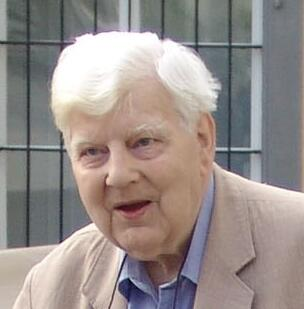
Michael Dummett

- Alfred Ayer (1910–1989), philosopher
- John Lane Bell (1945– ), logician
- Daniel Dennett (1942– ), philosopher
- John Theophilus Desaguliers (1683–1744), philosopher
- Michael Dummett (1925–2011), philosopher
- John Locke (1632–1704), philosopher
- Gilbert Ryle (1900–1976), philosopher
- John Rawls (1921–2002), philosopher
- John Searle (1932– ), philosopher

== Theologians ==
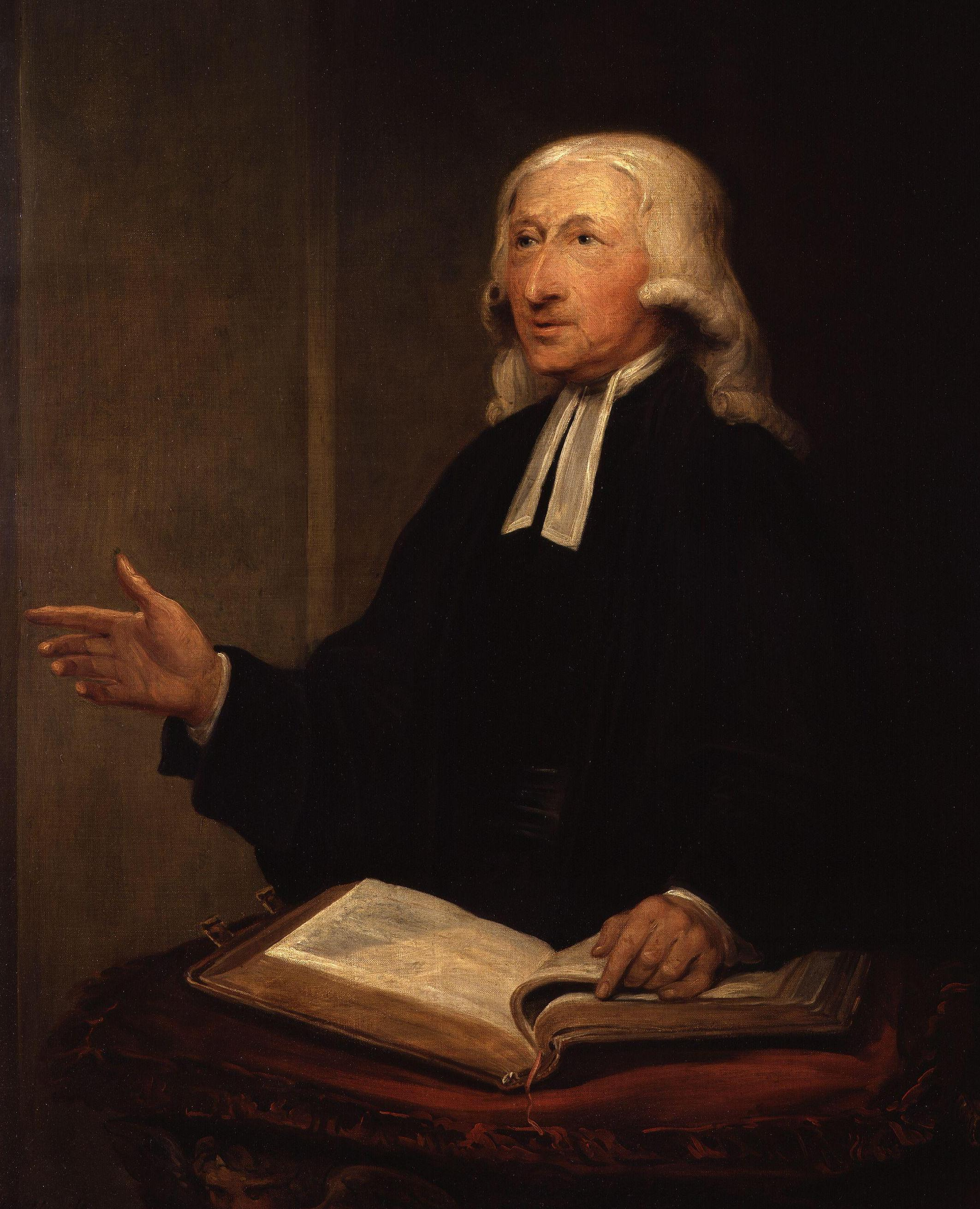
John Wesley

- Lancelot Blackburne 1658–1743), Archbishop of York
- Adam Blakeman (1596–1665), preacher and American settler
- Michael Cox (1689–1779), Archbishop of Cashel
- Percy Dearmer (1867–1936), priest and liturgist
- John Dolben (1625–1686), Archbishop of York
- Robert Hay Drummond (1711–1776), Archbishop of York
- John Fell (bishop) (1625–1686), Dean of Christ Church and Bishop of Oxford
- Samuel Fell (1584–1649) Dean of Christ Church, Oxford and Vice-Chancellor of the University of Oxford
- John Gilbert (1693–1761), Archbishop of York
- Bernard Gilpin (1517–1583), 'Apostle of the North'
- William Howley (1766–1848), Archbishop of Canterbury
- Trevor Huddleston (1913–1998), Archbishop of Mauritius and anti-Apartheid campaigner
- Edward King (1829–1910), high church Bishop of Lincoln
- George William Kitchin (1827–1912), theologian and Dean of Durham Cathedral
- Charles Longley (1794–1868), Archbishop of Canterbury
- John Macquarrie (1919–2007), Christian Existentialist
- William Markham (bishop) (1719–1807), Archbishop of York
- Eric Lionel Mascall (1905–1993), Anglo-Catholic theologian
- Tobias Matthew (1546–1628), Archbishop of York, Dean of Christ Church, Vice-Chancellor of Oxford University
- John Moore (1730–1805), Archbishop of Canterbury
- John Morris (1595-1648), Regius Professor of Hebrew at Oxford
- John Piers (1522/3 – 1594), Archbishop of York
- John Potter (1674–1747), Archbishop of Canterbury
- Edward Bouverie Pusey (1800–1882), churchman and progenitor of the Oxford Movement
- John Charles Ryle (1816–1900), evangelical Anglican leader and first Bishop of Liverpool
- Edward Venables-Vernon-Harcourt (1757–1847), Archbishop of York
- Peter Martyr Vermigli (1499–1562), theologian
- William Wake (1657–1737), Archbishop of Canterbury
- Charles Wesley (1707–1788), Methodist preacher and hymnist
- John Wesley (1703–1791), leader of the Methodist movement
- Rowan Williams (1950–), Archbishop of Canterbury

== Academics ==
- Spencer Barrett (1914–2001), classical scholar
- Edward de Bono (1933–)
- Anthony Chenevix-Trench (1919–1979), classicist and headmaster of Bradfield College, Eton College and Fettes College
- Homi K. Bhabha (1949–), Anne F. Rothenberg Professor of English and American Literature and Language
- Robert Blake, Baron Blake (1916–2003), historian
- Robert Burchfield (1923–2004) scholar, writer, and lexicographer
- Shahid Javed Burki (1938–), Vice-President of the World Bank
- Ronald Montagu Burrows (1867–1920), Principal of King's College London (1913–1920)
- William Camden (1551–1623), antiquarian and historian
- Richard Carew (1555–1620), translator and antiquary
- Raymond Carr (1919–), historian
- Norman Cohn (1915–2007), historian
- William Deakin (1913–2005), historian and diplomat
- Robert William Eyton (1815–1881), antiquarian of Shropshire
- Charles Dennis Fisher (1877–1916), classical scholar
- SR Gardiner (1829–1902), historian
- Mark Girouard (1931-), architectural historian
- Sonia Harris (1974-) legal academic and High Court judge
- Roy Harrod (1900–1978), economist
- Michael Howard (1922–2019), historian
- Richard William Jelf (1798–1871), Principal of King's College London (1843–1868)
- Hugh Lloyd-Jones (1922–2009), classical scholar
- Halford John Mackinder, (1861–1947), geographer and educationalist
- Richard Newton, (1676–1753), founder and principal of the first Hertford College, Oxford in 1740
- Laurence Nowell (c.1515-c.1571), antiquary and cartographer
- Prince Dmitriy Obolensky (1918–2001), historian
- Bishop William Stubbs (1825–1901), distinguished constitutional historian and ecclesiastic
- A. L. Rowse (1903–1997), historian
- Hugh Trevor-Roper, Baron Dacre (1914–2003), historian

== Mathematicians and scientists ==
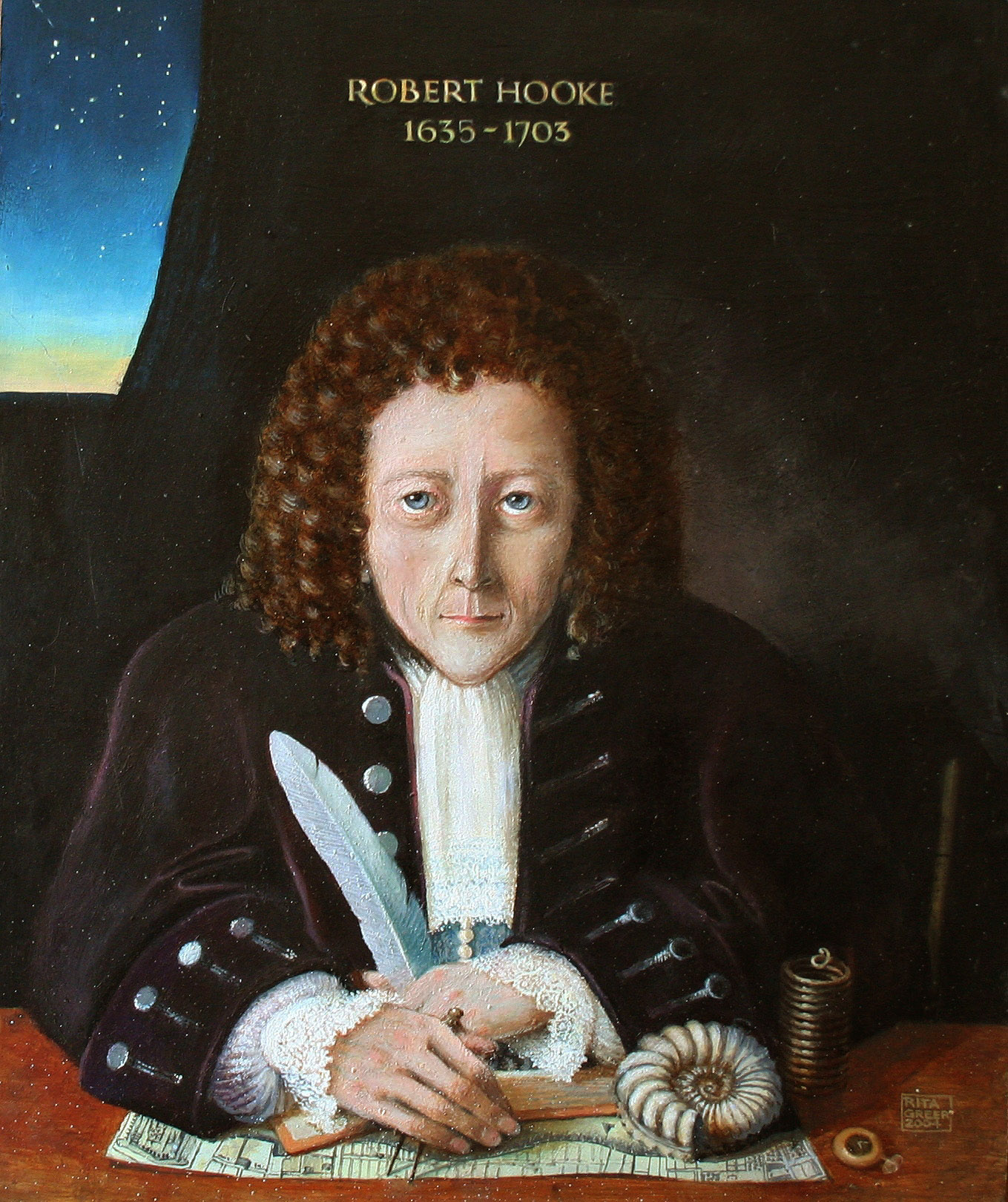
Robert Hooke

- Sir Wallace Akers (1888–1954), chemist
- Andrea Angel (1877–1917), chemist who died in the Silvertown explosion
- Joseph Banks (1743–1820), botanist
- John D. Barrow (1977–1980), cosmologist, Templeton Laureate, RAS Gold medallist
- William Buckland (1784–1856), geologist, palaeontologist, and omnivore
- Kenneth Callow (1901–1983), biochemist
- Ted Cooke-Yarborough (1918–2013), computer and radar pioneer
- Richard Doll (1912–2005), epidemiologist
- Albert Einstein (elected to a 5-year Research Studentship in 1931)
- John Freind (1675–1728), physician and chemist
- Archibald Garrod (1857–1936), physician and pioneer molecular geneticist
- John B. Gurdon (1933–), developmental biologist, co-winner of the 2012 Nobel Prize in Physiology or Medicine
- Clare Grey, chemist, University of Cambridge professor
- Edmund Gunter (1581–1626), mathematician
- John Kidd (1775–1851), physician, chemist and geologist
- Robert Hooke (1635–1703), scientist and inventor
- Ray Lankester (1847–1929), invertebrate zoologist and evolutionary biologist, Copley Medal award winner
- Richard Lower (physician) (1631–1691), first to perform blood transfusion
- John Maddox (1925–2009), science writer
- William Osler (1849–1919), physician, Father of Modern Medicine, and Regius Chair of Medicine (Oxford, 1905–1919)
- Martin Ryle (1918–1984), radio astronomer
- Francis Simon (1893–1956), physicist
- Alfred Ubbelohde (1907–1988), Chemist
- Patrick David Wall (1925–2001), Neuroscientist
- Denys Wilkinson (1922–2016), nuclear physicist
- Mark Williamson, biologist
- Thomas Willis (1621–1675), physician and neurologist
- Martin Wood (1927–), engineer
- Cheng Ching (1916–1989), physicist,son of Professior Cheng Tingxi(Chuntai) of BNU. He returned to China around 1950 and became schizophrenic during the political prosecution during 1950s and died in 1989.

== Sports people ==
- Harold Barker, Silver in the Coxless Four – 1908 GB
- John Pius Boland (1870–1958), MP and winner of gold medal for tennis in the 1896 Olympics
- Robin Bourne-Taylor, Eight – 2004, Pair – 2008 GB
- Peter Cazalet (1907–73), English cricketer, jockey, racehorse owner and trainer
- Lewis Clive, Gold in the Coxless Pair – 1932 GB, killed in action in the Spanish Civil War
- Hugh R A (Jumbo) Edwards, Gold in the Coxless Pair – 1932, Gold in the Coxless Four – 1932 GB
- Albert Gladstone, Gold in the Eight – 1908 GB
- Charles Grimes (rower), Gold in the Eight – 1956 USA
- Ante Kušurin, Double Sculls – 2008 Croatia
- Max Mosley, President of FIA 1993–2009
- David Sawyier, Coxed Four – 1972 USA
- Jamie Schroeder, Quadruple Sculls – 2008 USA
- Jonny Searle (1969–), Gold in the Coxed pair – 1992 Summer Olympics, Bronze in the Coxed Four – 1996 Summer Olympics
- Cameron and Tyler Winklevoss, Coxless Pair – 2008 Summer Olympics USA, see also business

== Artists and writers ==
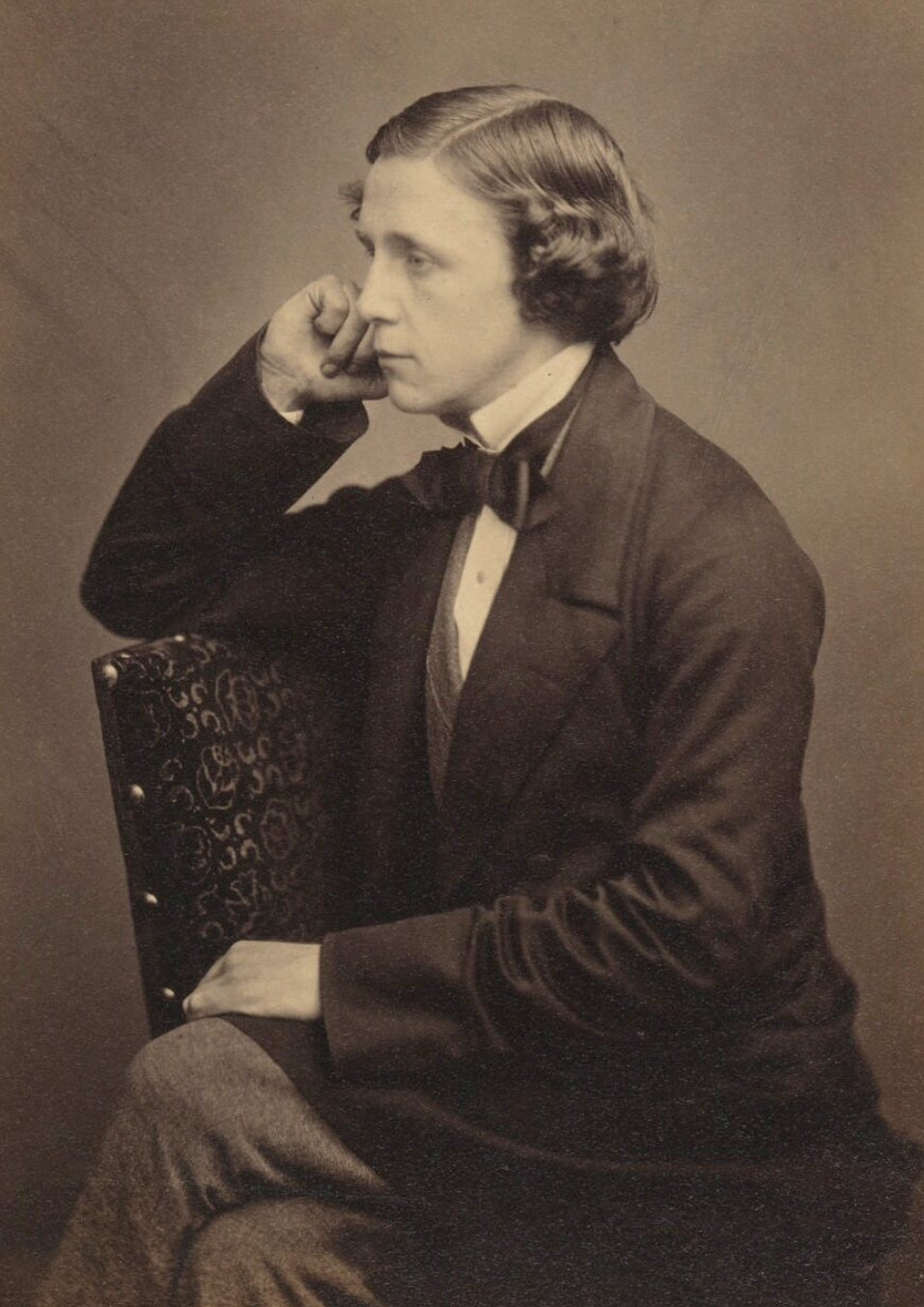
Lewis Carroll

- Harold Acton (1904–1994) writer and scholar
- W. H. Auden (1907–1973), poet
- F. W. Bain (1863–1940), writer of fantasy stories
- Daubridgecourt Belchier(1580–1621), dramatist
- Kate Brooke, screenwriter
- Robert Burton (1577–1640), writer of 'The Anatomy of Melancholy'
- David Carritt (1927–1982), British art historian, dealer and critic
- Lewis Carroll (1832–1898), (real name, Charles Lutwidge Dodgson), writer, clergyman and mathematician
- Apsley Cherry-Garrard (1886–1959), Antarctic explorer and writer
- Richard Curtis (1956–), comedy writer
- Sir Robert Dudley (1574–1649), explorer and cartographer
- Geoffrey Faber (1889–1961), publisher
- Peter Fleming (1907–1971), traveller and writer
- Charles Greville (1794–1865), diarist and cricketer
- Bryan Guinness 2nd Lord Moyne (1905–1992), poet and brewer
- Desmond Guinness (1931–), conservationist and author
- Sheridan Hamilton-Temple-Blackwood, 5th Marquess of Dufferin and Ava (1938–1988), art patron
- Richard Hakluyt (1552–1616), writer
- Francis Hastings, 16th Earl of Huntingdon (1901–1990), artist
- Henry Hitchings (1974–), author and critic
- Barney Hoskyns (1959–) acclaimed music journalist
- Lennie Lee (1958–), artist
- Matthew Gregory Lewis (1775–1818), novelist and dramatist
- John Cecil Masterman (1891–1977), academic, sportsman, author and spymaster
- Adrian Mitchell (1932–2008), poet, novelist and playwright
- Jan Morris (1926-2020), writer
- Lewis Charles Powles (1860-1942), artist
- Clere Parsons (1908–1931), poet
- Bishop Thomas Percy (1729–1811), balladeer and early romantic poet
- Frank Prewett, (1893–1962), poet
- John Crowe Ransom (1888–1974), American poet, critic and academic
- John Ruskin (1819–1900), critic, poet and artist
- Anthony Sampson (1926–2004), writer
- Philip Sidney (1554–1586), poet and soldier
- Philip Stanhope, 5th Earl Stanhope(1805–1875), founder of the National Portrait Gallery
- J. I. M. Stewart (Michael Innes) (1906–1994), literary critic and novelist
- Christopher Sykes (1907–1986), author
- James Twining (1972–), novelist
- Theippan Maung Wa (1899–1942), a pioneer of Burmese literary movement
- Auberon Waugh (1939–2001), author and journalist
- Stanley Weyman (1855–1928), novelist
- Theodore Zeldin (1933–), writer

== Performing arts ==
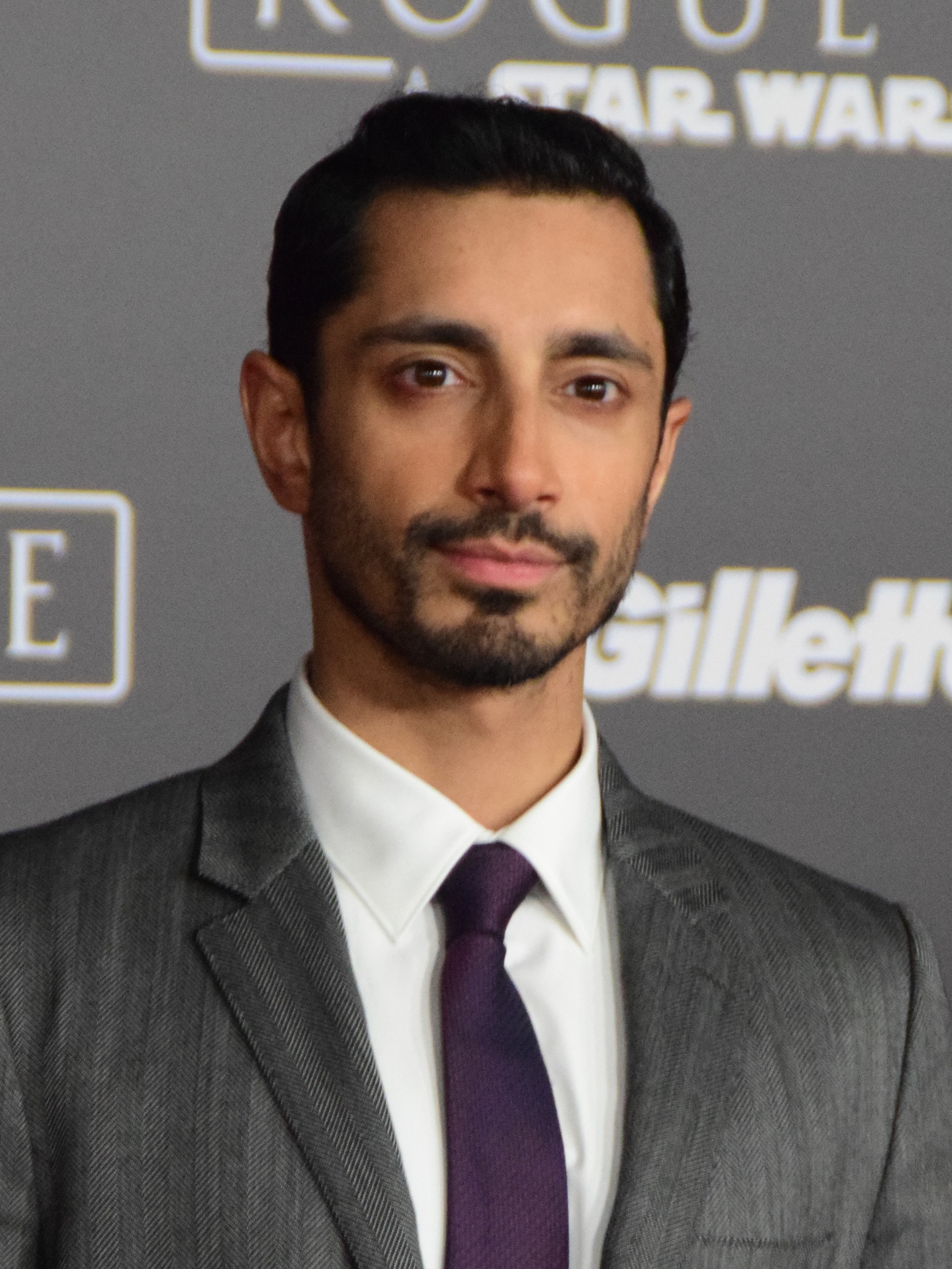
Riz Ahmed

- Riz Ahmed (1982–), actor and rapper
- Thomas Armstrong (1898–1994), musician
- Kenneth Barnes (1878–1957), Director of R.A.D.A.
- Adrian Boult (1889–1983), conductor
- Laurence Cummings, conductor, organist, harpsichordist
- John Dowland (1563–1626), lutenist and composer
- Giles Farnaby (c. 1563–1640), composer and virginalist
- Michael Flanders (1922–1975), actor, writer and broadcaster
- Howard Goodall (1958–), composer and broadcaster
- Colin Gordon (1911–1972), actor
- Harry Lloyd (1983–), actor
- Norman Painting (1924–2009), radio actor (The Archers)
- Hugh Quarshie (1954–), actor
- Douglas Reith (1953–), actor
- James Ross, conductor
- Donald Swann (1923–1994), composer, musician and entertainer
- John Taverner (1490–1545), composer
- William Walton (1902–1983), composer
- Peter Warlock (1894–1930), composer and critic

== Journalists and broadcasters ==
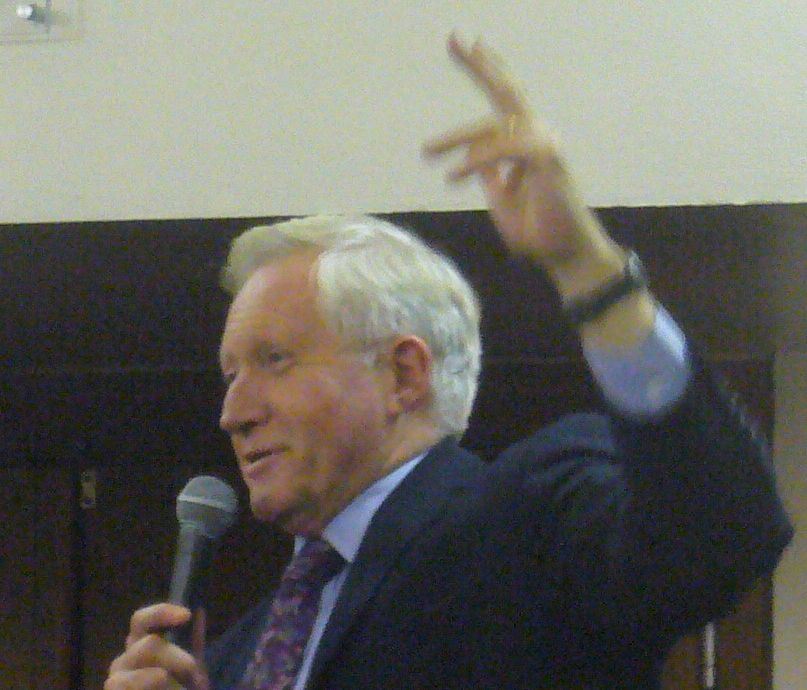
David Dimbleby

- Adam Boulton (1959–), Editor-at-large, Sky News
- David Dimbleby (1938–), broadcaster
- Mehdi Hasan, journalist
- Anthony Howard (1934–2010), journalist and broadcaster
- Marina Hyde, journalist at The Guardian
- Ludovic Kennedy (1919–2009), broadcaster and writer
- Dominic Lawson (1956–), Journalist and son of Nigel Lawson
- S. P. B. Mais (1885–1975), author, journalist and broadcaster
- Hugh Pym (1959-) Health Editor, BBC News
- Richard Stengel (1955–), Managing Editor of Time Magazine
- Sonya Walger (1974–), actress

== Business ==
- Alex Beard (1967–), businessman, Glencore
- Kate Bingham (1965-), venture capitalist
- Russ Dallen, Publisher; investment bank head
- Sir William Goodenough, 1st Baronet (1899–1951), Chairman of Barclays Bank
- Sir Peter Green (1924–1996), Chairman of Lloyds Bank
- Paul Hamlyn (1926–2001), Publisher (Octopus Publishing Group) and philanthropist.
- Christopher Jones (1976-), venture investor, UVM Health Network Ventures
- Emmanuel Kampouris (1934–), Chairman and CEO of American Standard Companies
- Oswald Lewis (1887–1966), Partner in John Lewis & Company
- Sir Henry Meux, 2nd Baronet (1817–1883), Head of brewery Meux and Co
- Sir Charles Mills, 1st Baronet (1792–1872), Director of the East India Company
- Charles Mills, 1st Baron Hillingdon (1830–1898), Partner at Glyn, Mills & Co and MP
- Sir Nigel Mobbs (1937–2005), Chairman of Slough Estates and director of Barclays Bank
- Russi Mody (1918–2014), Chairman and managing director, Tata Steel (formerly TISCO), India
- Peter Moores (1932–2016), Founder of Littlewoods
- Michael Moritz (1954–), venture capitalist, Sequoia Capital
- Crispin Odey (1959–) hedge fund manager
- David Ogilvy (1929–1999) Iconic advertisement guru; known as the 'Pope of Advertising', he founded Ogilvy & Mather
- Nicky Oppenheimer (1945–) South African at De Beers
- Jonathan Oppenheimer (1969–) South African at De Beers
- Weetman Pearson (1910–1995), Chairman and President of S. Pearson & Son
- Oliver Poole (1911–1993), Chairman of Lazzard, Director of S Pearson & Sons, and MP for Oswestry
- James A. Reed (1963–), Chairman of the Reed group of companies
- Jacob Rothschild, 4th Baron Rothschild (1936–2024), investment banker and philanthropist
- Saxon Tate (1931–2012), MD of Tate & Lyle
- Henry Thynne, 6th Marquess of Bath (1905–1992), Developer of Longleat Safari Park and MP for Frome
- Fredric Warburg (1898–1981), publisher
- Stuart Wheeler (1935–) businessman at IG Index
- Cameron and Tyler Winklevoss (1981–), twins associated with the founding of Facebook

== Other people ==
- Anthony Ashley-Cooper, 10th Earl of Shaftesbury (1938–2004)
- Fra' Andrew Bertie (1929–2008), Prince and Grand Master of the Order of Malta
- Gottfried von Bismarck (1962–2007)
- John Boyd (1718–1800), art collector and sugar merchant
- Charles Boyle, 4th Earl of Orrery (1674–1731), statesman and patron of the sciences
- Richard Scott, 10th Duke of Buccleuch (1954–), Scotland's largest private landowner
- Richard Busby (1606–1695), Headmaster of Westminster School
- James Thomas Brudenell, 7th Earl of Cardigan (1797–1868), soldier and commander of the Light Brigade at Balaclava
- John Chapman (1865–1933), abbot of Downside Abbey and founder of Worth School.
- Hubert Chesshyre, retired British officer of arms found to have committed child sexual abuse
- Christopher Codrington (1668–1710), plantation and slave owner, endowed Codrington College and Codrington Library
- Laurence Shirley, 4th Earl Ferrers (1720–1760), last member of the House of Lords hanged in England
- General Thomas Graham, 1st Baron Lynedoch (1748–1843), commander in the Peninsular War
- Kurt Hahn (1886–1974), Founder of Outward Bound and the Duke of Edinburgh Award
- Jonathan Hancock (1972–), memory champion
- John Steel "Jock" Lewes (1913-1941), President of the Oxford University Boat Club (1936-37) and "co-founder" of the Special Air Service.
- Henry Liddell (1811–1898), dean of Christ Church, Vice-Chancellor of Oxford University, and headmaster of Westminster School.
- Sir Peter Osborne, 17th Baronet (1943–), father of George Osborne
- William Penn (1644–1718), founder of Pennsylvania
- Charles Portal, 1st Viscount Portal of Hungerford (1893–1971), Marshal of the Royal Air Force and Chief of the Air Staff, Second World War
- Timothy Potts Director of the Fitzwilliam Museum
- Ambrose St. John (1815–1875), close companion of John Henry Newman
- Richard Fitzgeorge de Stacpoole, 1st Duc de Stacpoole (1787–1848)
- Redmond Watt (1950–), Commander-in-Chief, Land Command, British Army
