= Susan Chilcott =

UK soprano opera singer

Susan Chilcott (8 July 1963 – 4 September 2003) was an English soprano, considered one of the best of her generation. She died of breast cancer at the age of 40. She had success in many of the major opera houses around the world and was particularly known for her interpretations of Britten and Janáček.

== Early life ==
Chilcott lived in the village of Timsbury, Somerset, near Bath, England. At the age of 12 her talent was noted by Mollie Petrie, a singing teacher, who remained with her as a singing coach and advisor for the rest of her career. In 1982, she started studying at the Guildhall School of Music.

== Singing career ==
Her operatic debut was as the First Lady in The Magic Flute, in Oviedo in 1991. In that year she also sang with the Scottish Opera. The performance which could be described as her major breakthrough, bringing her to the attention of a wider audience, was her interpretation of Ellen Orford in Benjamin Britten's Peter Grimes at La Monnaie in Belgium in 1994. During the next few years, she had huge success in Europe, singing roles from Verdi, Boesmans, Dvořák, Britten and Janáček. Indeed, her performance in 1999 in Janáček's Katya Kabanova was considered by many critics to be one of her best.

Another highly successful performance was in 2001 at Glyndebourne as Desdemona in Sir Peter Hall's production of Otello. In 2002 she sang opposite Plácido Domingo in Tchaikovsky's The Queen of Spades at Covent Garden. That same year she debuted and sang five performances as Helena in Britten's "A Midsummer Night's Dream" at the Metropolitan Opera. Her last full operatic role was as Jenufa for Welsh National Opera in 2003 and for this she received, posthumously, the 2004 Royal Philharmonic Society Singer Award. Apart from her operatic work, she also gave concerts, often with pianist Iain Burnside, a close friend, and, with him and the actress Fiona Shaw, gave intimate poetry recitals.

== Illness and death ==
In 2001, Chilcott was diagnosed with breast cancer, but recovered enough to return to the stage. However, in 2003, she relapsed, and died on 4 September 2003, aged 40 at home in Timsbury.

== Family life ==
Chilcott was raised by adoptive parents. In adulthood, she had a relationship, which produced her only son Hugh, and later married her agent, David Sigall. She had a relationship with Jonathan Dimbleby which led to his divorce from Bel Mooney. Dimbleby lived with and cared for Chilcott for the last four months of her life.

== Scholarship ==
After her death, a charity, the Susan Chilcott Scholarship, was set up to help aspiring singers with their careers. Its patron is Plácido Domingo, the president is Jonathan Dimbleby and the trustees are Dame Josephine Barstow, Iain Burnside (chair), Pamela Bullock, Neal Davies, Simon Freakley, John Gilhooly and Ian Rosenblatt. The Chilcott Award is awarded biennially and is administered by the Royal Philharmonic Society.
