= State visit by Elizabeth II to Russia =

1994 visit by the British monarch

- Date: 17 to 20 October 1994
- Location: Moscow, Saint Petersburg
- Type: State visit
- Participants: Elizabeth II; Prince Philip, Duke of Edinburgh; Douglas Hurd

Queen Elizabeth II of the United Kingdom of Great Britain and Northern Ireland, her husband Prince Philip, Duke of Edinburgh and Foreign Secretary Douglas Hurd made a state visit to Russia from 17 to 20 October 1994, hosted by the President of Russia, Boris Yeltsin. It is the first and so far only visit by a reigning British monarch on Russian soil. (Note: The only previous visit by a British monarch to Russia was made by King Edward VII in 1908. The King never stepped ashore, and met Nicholas II on royal yachts off the Baltic port of what is now Tallinn, Estonia.)

The four-day visit is said to be one of the most important foreign trips of the Queen's reign.

== Background ==
The murder of Nicholas II prevented royal trips to Russia and the Soviet Union

The killing of Nicholas II and his family in 1918 prevented royal trips from being made to Russia and the Soviet Union. In 1967, when Prince Philip was asked if he would go to Moscow to help ease Cold War tensions, he said:

"I'd very much like to go to Russia - although the bastards murdered half my family".

In September 1973, Prince Philip attended the European Eventing Championships in Kiev as president of the International Equestrian Federation with his daughter, Princess Anne. They became the first British royal family members to visit the Soviet Union since Nicholas II's execution.

In 1989, Mikhail Gorbachev made an official visit to the United Kingdom in which he met the Queen. The Queen and Gorbachev met again in July 1991 at the 17th G7 summit in London. Despite this the Queen declined an invitation by Gorbachev to visit the Soviet Union. Following the dissolution of the Soviet Union, Prince Charles visited Saint Petersburg in May 1994 and the Queen accepted an invitation by President Boris Yeltsin to visit the country in October 1994.

On 15 October 1994, Prince Charles approved Jonathan Dimbleby's biography of him titled The Prince of Wales: A Biography. The book caused controversy due to Prince Charles's revelation that his father Prince Philip had pressured him into marrying Diana Spencer and that he was never in love with her. Prince Charles's biography was considered to have overshadowed the visit in the British media with newspapers speculating about excerpts from the biography. Foreign Secretary Douglas Hurd, who would attend the visit with the Queen, said that he was worried about the way in which "chattering people concerned with headlines and mass circulation" affected institutions such as the monarchy. It was reported that aides travelling with the Queen spent much of the visit playing down the controversy.

In contrast, Russian media focused on the Queen and her popularity in the United Kingdom with newspaper and television coverage of the visit continuing for several days. Russia was described by The Washington Post as being in the midst of a "mini-monarchist boom", with some polls showing that as many as 18 per cent of Russians favoured a return to monarchy. Prince Philip said monarchy had thrived in Britain due to it being apolitical while the czar "was, by constitution, the autocrat." Philip was not convinced that people in Russia would want to return to monarchies, despite the presence of monarchist parties, saying "Do the pretenders actually want to go back? Because I don't think it's an unmitigated pleasure."

The Prime Minister of Russia Viktor Chernomyrdin did not return as planned from a holiday in the Black Sea resort of Sochi to welcome the monarch, despite being listed in official British protocol as the one who would welcome Elizabeth II. Russian Minister of Foreign Affairs Andrei Kozyrev was also scheduled to greet the Queen but did not return from New York where he was attending United Nations meetings on Iraq. Kozyrev was reportedly upset with his British counterpart Douglas Hurd for rejecting Russia's plans to resolve the Iraqi conflict.

== Events ==
Elizabeth II was greeted at Vnukovo International Airport in Moscow by First Deputy Prime Minister Oleg Soskovets and a guard of honour. Yeltsin and his wife, Naina, formally welcomed the royal couple at St. George's Hall in the Grand Kremlin Palace. They stayed in the Kremlin as Yeltsin's guests. The Queen attended a performance of Giselle at the Bolshoi Ballet, sitting in the "czar's box" underneath the State Emblem of the Soviet Union. She wore a tiara she had acquired herself instead of one of her tiaras she had acquired elsewhere such as the Grand Duchess Vladimir Tiara to not cause offence.

The next day, the Queen toured the Kremlin and Red Square and visited an English-language school before attending a state banquet hosted by President Boris Yeltsin. At the banquet, the Queen addressed Yeltsin and said, "You and I have spent most of our lives believing that this evening could never happen. I hope that you are as delighted as I am to be proved wrong". She laid a wreath at the Tomb of the Unknown Soldier near the Kremlin Wall commemorating World War II casualties. Elizabeth II met the mayor of Moscow Yury Luzhkov outside of Saint Basil's Cathedral and she also met Patriarch Alexy II, the primate of the Russian Orthodox Church.

The Queen flew to Saint Petersburg on 19 October, where she visited Peter and Paul Fortress, went to a Catholic church and met local orphan children. Elizabeth II departed Russia aboard the royal yacht, HMY Britannia on 20 October 1994. Before returning to the United Kingdom, she made an official visit to Finland.

== Legacy ==
Boris Yeltsin said the visit was to Russia the "utmost recognition that our country is on the road to democracy" and his chief spokesman Vyacheslav Kostikov said the Queen's visit was evidence of Russia's break with its totalitarian past. Kostikov added they were aware that the British queen would never have visited a Communist country. Following the visit, a Russian royalist party announced that it had amassed 800,000 signatures in support of a referendum on whether a constitutional monarchy should be established in Russia.

In her 1994 Christmas Message, the Queen reflected on how times had changed, noting she "never thought it would be possible in [her] lifetime" to attend a service in Saint Basil's Cathedral. Prince Philip made a solo visit to Russia in July 1995 as president of the World Wildlife Fund. In 2003, the Queen hosted Vladimir Putin's state visit to the United Kingdom and in 2014 they both met again during an event commemorating D-Day in France.

The visit is depicted in the episode "Ipatiev House" in season 5 of the television series The Crown.

== See also ==
- List of state visits made by Elizabeth II
- Monarchism in Russia
- Russia–United Kingdom relations
