= How We Built Britain =

2007 British television documentary series

How We Built Britain is a series of six television documentaries produced by the BBC in 2007 and repeated in 2008. The series was written and presented by broadcaster David Dimbleby. In the series Dimbleby visits some of Britain's great historic buildings and examined their impact on Britain's architectural and social history.

The series was a follow-up to Dimbleby's 2005 BBC One series, A Picture of Britain, which celebrates British and Irish paintings, poetry, music, and landscapes.

== Programme list ==
Episode 1: The East: A New Dawn

Dimbleby begins his tour of Britain's historic buildings in Ely in Ely Cathedral before moving on to Hedingham Castle, Norwich and Lavenham. He visited Walsingham and the Slipper Chapel before finishing at the University of Cambridge's King's College Chapel.

Episode 2: The Heart of England: Living It Up

In this programme Dimbleby examines how England had been changed by the Elizabethan Renaissance and visited stately homes including Burghley House, Harvington Hall, the Triangular Lodge and Chastleton House, one of Britain's most complete Jacobean houses.

Episode 3: Scotland: Towering Ambitions

In this episode Dimbleby travels north to discover how Scotland developed its own distinctive building style. During the programme he visited Stirling Castle, Dunrobin Castle, Gearrannan on the Isle of Lewis and Charles Rennie Mackintosh's masterpiece, the Glasgow School of Art before finishing at the new Scottish Parliament Building in Edinburgh.

Episode 4: The West: Putting on the Style

Episode 4 sees Dimbleby visiting the Georgian terraces of Bath and Bristol, as well as Blenheim Palace and Stourhead. Visiting sites where the Industrial Revolution began, he looked at the canals and locks of the West Country and the tin mines of Cornwall before travelling across Wales to Thomas Telford's Menai Bridge and Ireland to explore Georgian Dublin.

Episode 5: The North: Full Steam Ahead

The start of Queen Victoria's reign saw Britain's greatest construction explosion and in this programme Dimbleby travelled to Manchester, Leeds, Newcastle and Blackpool's Tower Ballroom to find out how factories, town halls, sewers, churches, hospitals and dance halls were built in an attempt to deal with the rapidly expanding urban population.

Episode 6:The South: Dreams of Tomorrow

In the final programme Dimbleby examines twentieth-century architecture and explored suburban homes and tower blocks in London and other buildings in the South East of England.

== Publications ==
Dimbleby also wrote a book, 'How We Built Britain' (Photography Paul Barker), to accompany the series.
