= List of longest-serving British television presenters =

This is a list of the longest-running television presenters in the United Kingdom, on their respective programmes. List excludes newsreaders and voice work.

Show name	Presenter	Duration	Length (years)
The Sky at Night	Patrick Moore	1957–2013	55
Beechgrove	Jim McColl	1978–2019	41
The South Bank Show	Melvyn Bragg	1978–2010, 2012–present	41
See Hear	Clive Mason	1984–present	37
Beechgrove	Carole Baxter	1986–present	35
Children in Need	Sir Terry Wogan	1980–2014	34
Countryfile	John Craven	1989–present	32
Chelsea Flower Show	Alan Titchmarsh	1983–2013	30
It'll Be Alright on the Night	Denis Norden	1977–2006	29
Wish You Were Here...?	Judith Chalmers	1974–2003	29
Later... with Jools Holland	Jools Holland	1992–present	29
This Is Your Life	Eamonn Andrews	1955–1964, 1969–1987	27
Channel 4 Racing	Derek Thompson	1985–2012	27
University Challenge	Jeremy Paxman	1994–2023	27
Film...	Barry Norman	1973–1998	26
Des O'Connor Tonight	Des O'Connor	1983–2002	25
Mastermind	Magnus Magnusson	1972–1997	25
University Challenge	Bamber Gascoigne	1962–1987	25
Newsnight	Jeremy Paxman	1989–2014	25
Newsnight	Kirsty Wark	1993–present	24
Question Time	David Dimbleby	1994–2018	23
Crimewatch	Nick Ross	1984–2007	23
Soccer Saturday	Jeff Stelling	1994–2023	29
Countdown	Richard Whiteley	1982–2005	22
Soccer AM	Helen Chamberlain	1995–2017	22
Parkinson	Michael Parkinson	1971–1982, 1987–1988, 1998–2007	22
Record Breakers	Roy Castle	1972-1993	21
That's Life!	Esther Rantzen	1973–1994	21
Through the Keyhole	Sir David Frost	1987–2008	21
British Comedy Awards	Jonathan Ross	1991–2007, 2009–2014	21
This Morning (TV programme)	Ruth Langsford	1999–present	21
Top of the Pops	Sir Jimmy Savile	1964–1984	20
Tomorrow's World	Judith Hann	1974–1994	20
The Sooty Show	Harry Corbett	1955–1975	20
A Question of Sport	Sue Barker	1997–2021	23
Ski Sunday	David Vine	1976–1996	20
Time Team	Tony Robinson	1994-2014	20
Call My Bluff	Robert Robinson	1969–1988	19
Antiques Roadshow	Hugh Scully	1981–2000	19
Jim'll Fix It	Sir Jimmy Savile	1975–1994	19
Match of the Day	Gary Lineker	1999–2025	26
A Question of Sport	David Coleman	1979–1997	18
Blind Date	Cilla Black	1985–2003	18
The Krypton Factor	Gordon Burns	1977–1995	18
Rainbow	Geoffrey Hayes	1974–1992	18
Kilroy	Robert Kilroy-Silk	1986–2004	17
Art Attack	Neil Buchanan	1990–2007	17
World of Sport	Dickie Davies	1968–1985	17
John Craven's Newsround	John Craven	1972–1989	17
The Wright Stuff	Matthew Wright	2000–2018	18
Pride of Britain Awards	Carol Vorderman	1999–present	17
