= Institute for Citizenship =

British independent charity

The Institute for Citizenship was a UK national independent charity. Its aim was to promote informed, active citizenship and greater participation in democracy and society through a combination of community projects, research, education and discussion and debate.

The Institute for Citizenship was formed in 1992 by Lord Weatherill following the work of the UK All-Party Parliamentary Commission on Citizenship. It campaigned for greater awareness of moral rights and responsibilities, and pioneered a range of citizenship resources in response to the introduction of Citizenship Education as part of the national Curriculum in 2002.

The Institute became involved in projects that promoted vital 21st Century skills such as opinion forming, debating, speaking and listening skills that help to form an inclusive society of active citizens. These projects included Schools Question Time and the Young Citizens' Action Agenda. On 10 July 2008 It hosted the Young Citizens' Action Event at Central Hall, Westminster which was attended by 1,400 teenagers and was hosted by Huw Edwards (BBC News).

David Dimbleby, then chairman of BBC ONE's Question Time, was president of the Institute. Dimbleby believed that the institute's role was to ensure we have an inclusive society of active citizens; 'The importance of involving young people – all people – in political decision-making is greater than ever. Globally and locally we face new and complex challenges, it is important that everyone takes part in the debate'. The Institute for Citizenship's chief executive was Zandria Pauncefort.

== Young Citizens' Action Agenda ==
The Young Citizens' Action Agenda was a campaign led by the Institute for Citizenship to give young citizens the voice and skills to produce solutions for the 21st Century.

The campaign, which was supported by the BBC, BT, Mentorn Media (Question Time Producers), City of London Corporation, Greater London Authority, Parliamentary Education Service, Steljes Technology and The Evening Standard, aimed to provide young citizens with the information and skills they needed to face the challenges of the 21st century.

The Young Citizens' Action Agenda was launched by the Young Citizens' Action Event hosted by Huw Edwards at Central Hall, Westminster on Thursday 10 July 2008, for 1,400 14- to 19-year-olds. In the evening the audience stayed on for a very special edition of Question Time hosted by Dimbleby, which was produced by 8 student producers who won the Schools Question Time Challenge (supported by the BBC, the Institute for Citizenship and BT).

The Event also featured guest appearances by an array of high-profile opinion formers, including Andrew Marr, Nik Wood, Mark Easton, Hardeep Singh Kohli, Ed Miliband MP, Iain Duncan Smith MP, Sir Mike Rake, Michael Cassidy CBE and the director general of the BBC, Mark Thompson. The Evening Standard called the event "groundbreaking" in an article about the day. Huw Edwards was also very impressed by the audience of young citizens who attended and took part in the day: "We have a generation who are enthusiastic about accepting responsibilities with their rights, which has got to be good". In an exclusive article about the event, the Institute for Citizenship's president, David Dimbleby, spoke about the importance of promoting Politics, Economics and Citizenship: "The importance of involving young people in political decision-making is greater than ever. Globally and locally we face new and complex challenges - it is important that everyone takes part in the debate."

After the Young Citizens' Action Event the Institute for Citizenship created two Young Citizens Panels, one for London and one for the whole of the UK. These panels were to use the information from the Young Citizens' Say Survey (provided by the audience) and the ideas from the Action Event to create Young Citizens' Action Agendas that were to be presented to the prime minister and Mayor of London in October 2008.

The Institute was dissolved in 2013.
