= Kenneth Callow =

British biochemist (1901–1983)

- Born: 15 February 1901; Goring-on-Thames, Oxfordshire, England
- Died: 12 April 1983 (aged 82); Maughold, Isle of Man

Robert Kenneth Callow, FRS (15 February 1901 – 12 April 1983) was a British biochemist. He worked at the National Institute for Medical Research (NIMR, Medical Research Council) in Hampstead and Mill Hill, where his work on steroids included contributions to the isolation and characterisation of vitamin D, and the synthesis of cortisone from naturally occurring steroids. After he retired from the NIMR in 1966 he worked on insect pheromones at Rothamsted Experimental Station (now Rothamsted Research) until 1971.

== Early life and education ==
Kenneth Callow was born on 15 February 1901 in Goring-on-Thames, Oxfordshire, England. His father, Cecil Callow (1865–1912), was an electrical engineer. Kenneth's mother, Kate Peverell (1868–1955), became the head of the Peverell household in Gateshead in 1885 after her parents died, when she was 17 years old with two younger sisters. After 1891 she moved to London. In 1896 she married Cecil Callow. Kenneth attended City of London School (1911–1919), on a scholarship after his father died in 1912. He was awarded a senior science scholarship in 1916, that allowed him to continue at school. In 1919 he went up to Christ Church, Oxford as an exhibitioner, to study chemistry. For part II chemistry his supervisor was Nevil Sidgwick, FRS.

After a time at British Celanese (1924–1927) he returned to Oxford as a Research Scholar of Christ Church, synthesising alkaloids and attempting to isolate taxine, a toxic alkaloid of yew. He submitted his D.Phil. thesis in 1929.

== Vitamin D ==
In 1929, he was invited by R.B. Bourdillon at NIMR in Hampstead to join him in work on vitamin D. The structure of vitamin D was unknown at that time, and the structure of steroids in general was a matter of debate. A meeting took place with J.B.S. Haldane, J.D. Bernal and Dorothy Crowfoot to discuss possible structures, which contributed to bringing a team together. X-ray crystallography demonstrated that sterol molecules were flat, not as previously proposed by Adolf Windaus.

In 1932, Otto Rosenheim and Harold King published a paper putting forward structures for sterols and bile acids which found immediate acceptance. The loose association between Bourdillon, Rosenheim, King and Callow was very productive and led to the isolation and characterisation of vitamin D. At this time the policy of the MRC was not to patent discoveries, believing that results of medical research should be open to everybody. The team working on vitamin D included Bourdillon, a physical chemist with a medical degree; T.C. Angus, a physician; F.A. Askew, a chemist; Hilda Bruce, a biologist, Kate Fischmann, a biologist, J. St.L. Philpott, a physical chemist, and T.A. Webster, a biologist.

== Collaborative work ==
Callow became involved with a variety of problems related to the work on vitamin D, including the claim that rickets was produced by the action of certain cereals. This was shown to be due to interference with calcium absorption (working with Hilda Bruce). He also worked closely with Alan Parkes who was working on the physiology of reproduction, and C.W. Emmens.

== Steroids ==
In the 1930s Callow became interested in the structure and action of sex hormones and identifying steroids in urine. In a 1936 paper, written with Frank Young, a footnote states "The term steroids is proposed as generic name for the group of compounds comprising the sterols, bile acids, heart poisons, saponins and sex hormones." Callow claimed that this was the first use of the term "steroids". He showed that androgens were excreted in the urine in similar amounts in men, women and eunuchs, which at the time was surprising.

His conclusion was that these substances were produced by the adrenal cortex as well as by the gonads. This conclusion was supported by findings made jointly with A.C. Crooke, working at the London Hospital, that patients with Cushing's syndrome, caused by a tumour of the adrenals, had very high levels of androgenic substances in the urine.

== War service 1940 – 1945 ==
Despite being in a reserved occupation, he joined the Royal Air Force in 1940. He became an armaments officer and spent much of the war in the NW Frontier area of India (Waziristan, now in Pakistan) defusing unexploded bombs. He was mentioned in dispatches for activity in the relief of Datta Khel. Later in the war he worked for the Inter-Services Research Bureau, a cover name for Special Operations Executive (SOE), an organisation responsible for sabotage in enemy-occupied territory, with A.G. Ogston, under the leadership of E. Gordon Cox, applying plant and medical chemistry, and developing unusual equipment.

== Cortisone ==
In 1945, he returned to the NIMR, and worked with John Cornforth on a commercially attractive way of synthesising cortisone from naturally occurring steroids. (Merck & Co had a long and complex synthesis from bile acids, the only known source of cortisone in quantity.) One possible source was sarmentogenin, found in extracts of arrow poisons (heart poisons) from Strophanthus seeds, but there was confusion about which species. During the course of this work Callow went to Nigeria at the invitation of Ibadan University, for six months with R.D. Meikle, a botanist from the Royal Botanic Gardens, Kew, to collect arrow poison material. S. sarmentosus was found to contain sarmentogenin but it was not easy to cultivate or to produce in sufficiently large quantities.

Another possible source was hecogenin from Agave sisalana, a plant native to Mexico, grown commercially in Kenya. This was a less direct way of producing cortisone, but the successful extraction and purification of hecogenin from the sisal plant, and its availability made it a suitable commercial source. Glaxo Laboratories cooperated with Cornforth and Callow to devise a production process for cortisone from hecogenin. In this case the work done by NIMR staff was patented and sold to Glaxo Labs.

Callow was elected as a Fellow of the Royal Society (FRS) in 1958.

== Honeybee pheromones ==
Callow became interested in the structure and action of "queen substance," produced by the queen honeybee, after hearing a talk by Dr. Colin G. Butler on honeybee behaviour at NIMR. Queen substance controls queen-rearing by honeybees, as well as being the sex pheromone attracting drones to a queen on her nuptial flights. Callow isolated and identified this as 9-oxodec-trans-2-enoic acid in 1959. This work led to a general interest in the biochemistry of insects. After he retired from the NIMR in 1966, Callow joined the staff at Rothamsted Experimental Station in the insecticide department. Using a mass spectrometer, he carried out work in the field of insect pheromones until 1971.

== Editorial and other work ==
Kenneth Callow was a member of the editorial board of the Biochemical Journal from 1946 until 1953. Later he was chairman of Biological and Medical Abstracts Ltd. He was a member of the Council of the Bee Research Association from 1962 to 1974, being chairman 1963–68, and later Vice-President.

== Personal life ==
In his work on oestrone he was assisted by Nancy Newman (1913–1989), whom he married in 1937. He was the father of John Callow (1944–2000) a merchant navy officer and arboriculturist, and "Mo" Callow (Mo Laidlaw), an ergonomist at Bell Northern Research in Ottawa from 1978 to 1987. He died 12 April 1983 in Maughold, Isle of Man where he had moved in 1980, in pursuit of his Manx ancestors. His grandfather Edward Callow wrote a history of the Isle of Man: From King Orry to Queen Victoria, Elliot Stock, 1899.
