= Josceline Dimbleby =

British cookery writer

- Born: Josceline Rose Gaskell; February 1943 (age 83); Witney, Oxfordshire, England
- Education: Cranborne Chase School
- Occupations: Food writer, broadcaster
- Spouse: David Dimbleby (m. 1967; div. 2000)
- Children: 3, including Henry Dimbleby and Kate Dimbleby
- Relatives: Sir William Montagu-Pollock (stepfather); Percy Hague Jowett (grandfather)

Josceline Rose Dimbleby (née Gaskell; born 1943) is a British cookery writer. She has written seventeen cookery books, and was cookery correspondent of The Sunday Telegraph for 15 years.

== Early life and education ==
Dimbleby was born in 1943. She is the daughter of Thomas Josceline Gaskell (1906-1982) and Barbara Jowett (died 1998), whose father Percy Hague Jowett was principal of London's Royal College of Art. In 1948, her mother Barbara Jowett married again, to Sir William Montagu-Pollock.

Dimbleby was educated at Cranborne Chase School, a former boarding independent school for girls near Tisbury in Wiltshire.

Dimbleby's great-grandmother, May Gaskell, was a "romantic confidante" of the artist Edward Burne-Jones, and a painting of her daughter Amy Gaskell by Burne-Jones is in the collection of Andrew Lloyd Webber. In 2004, Dimbleby published A Profound Secret, about May Gaskell's life.

== Selected publications ==
- Cooking for Christmas (1978)
- Marvellous Meals with Mince (1982)
- A Traveller's Tastes (1986)
- The Practically Vegetarian Cookbook (1994)
- A Profound Secret (2004)
- Orchards in the Oasis – Recipes, Travels and Memories (2010)

== Personal life ==
She has three children with her former husband, the broadcaster David Dimbleby, including Henry Dimbleby and Kate Dimbleby.
