= Percy Hague Jowett =

British artist (1882–1955)

- Born: 1882; Halifax, Yorkshire, England
- Died: 1955 (aged 72–73)
- Education: Leeds College of Art; Royal College of Art
- Occupations: Artist and arts administrator
- Title: Principal of the Royal College of Art
- Term: 1934–1948
- Predecessor: William Rothenstein
- Spouse: Enid Ledward
- Relatives: Gilbert Ledward (brother-in-law); Josceline Dimbleby (granddaughter)

Percy Hague Jowett (1882–1955) was a British artist and arts administrator, principal of the Royal College of Art from 1934 to 1948.

Jowett was born in Halifax, Yorkshire in 1882. He studied art at Leeds College of Art and London's Royal College of Art.

In 1927, he became head of Chelsea School of Art, and in 1935, principal of the Royal College of Art, succeeding William Rothenstein, and went on to give the sculptor Henry Moore his first job. During World War II, Jowett served as a committee member with the War Artists' Advisory Committee. He retired from the RCA in 1948.

== Personal life ==
Jowett married Enid Ledward, sister of the sculptor, Gilbert Ledward.
