= Richard Dimbleby =

English journalist and broadcaster (1913–1965)

Richard Dimbleby CBE
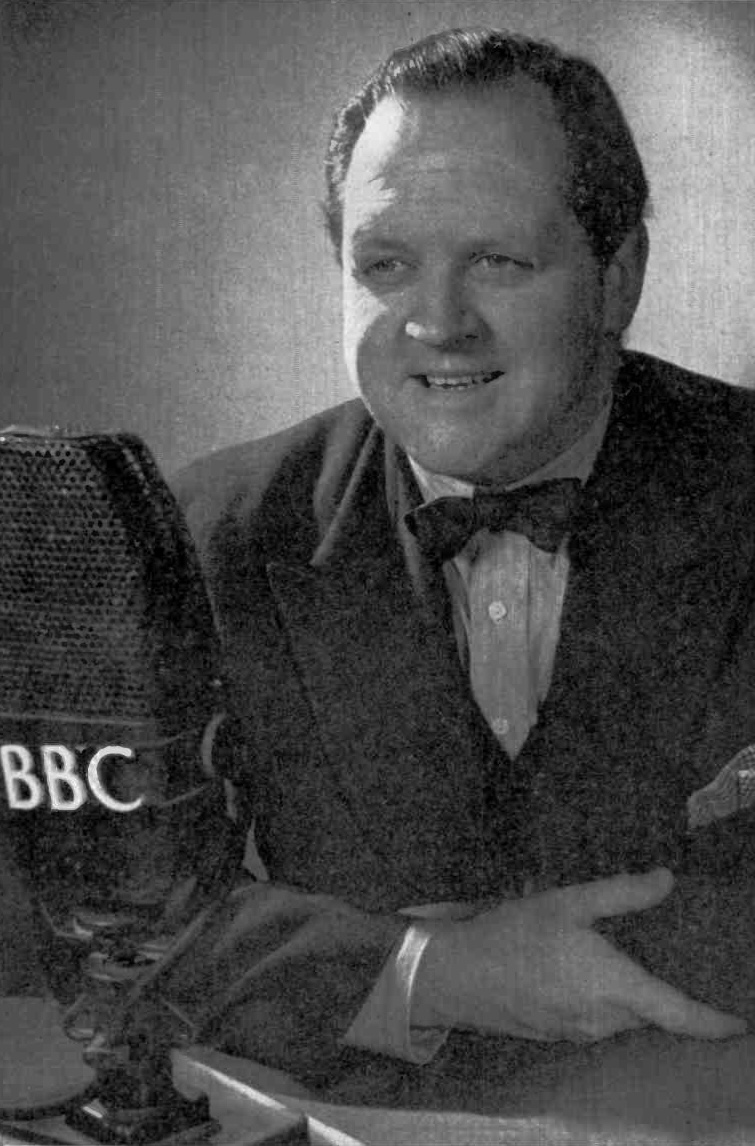
- Dimbleby in 1952
- Born: Frederick Richard Dimbleby; 25 May 1913; Richmond, Surrey, England
- Died: 22 December 1965 (aged 52); St Thomas' Hospital, London, England
- Education: Mill Hill School, London
- Occupation: Broadcaster
- Employer: BBC
- Spouse: Dilys Thomas (m. 1937)
- Children: 4, including David and Jonathan
- Relatives: Dimbleby family

Frederick Richard Dimbleby (25 May 1913 – 22 December 1965) was an English journalist and broadcaster who became the BBC's first war correspondent and then its leading TV news commentator.

As host of the long-running current affairs programme Panorama, he pioneered a popular style of interviewing that was respectful but searching. At formal public events, he could combine gravitas with creative insights based on extensive research. He was also able to maintain interest throughout the all-night election specials.

The annual Richard Dimbleby Lecture was founded in his memory.

== Biography ==
=== Early life and education ===
Dimbleby was born near Richmond, Surrey, the son of Gwendoline Mabel (Bolwell) and Frederick Jabez George Dimbleby (d. 1943), a journalist.

He was educated at Glengorse Preparatory School in Eastbourne, then at The Mall School in Twickenham, and finally at Mill Hill School. He began his career in 1931 on the Richmond and Twickenham Times, which his grandfather, Frederick William Dimbleby, had acquired in 1894. Dimbleby's father had been press officer for the Ministry of Labour under David Lloyd George and held a position with the Daily Mail on Fleet Street, but had fallen out over interwar views on fascism and instead joined the family firm.

Dimbleby then worked as a news reporter on the Southern Evening Echo in Southampton, before joining the BBC as a radio news reporter in 1936 on a salary of £360 per annum. He went on to cover the first Royal tour of Canada,

In 1938 he was the reporter who covered the infamous "Peace in our Time" story when Chamberlain returned from Munich. This was one of the first broadcasts on both radio and television.

=== War career ===
Dimbleby was the BBC's first war correspondent. This was broadcast on radio only as television transmissions were closed down for the duration of the war. He accompanied the British Expeditionary Force to France and made broadcasts from the front. He later covered the battle of El Alamein and the Normandy beaches during the D-Day landings.

During the Second World War, he flew on some twenty raids as an observer with RAF Bomber Command, including a sortie on 16 January 1943 to Berlin piloted by Guy Gibson. On the raids he recorded commentary for broadcast the following day. He was one of the first journalists to experiment with unconventional outside broadcasts, such as when flying in a de Havilland Mosquito accompanying a fighter aircraft raid on France, or being submerged in a diving suit.

On 1 November 1944 he accompanied a "pathfinder" RAF mission of Lancasters and Halifaxes, dropping coloured flares onto central Cologne to aid the following main bomb attack. On 25 March 1945 he accompanied a mission towing gliders over the Rhine, during which heavy losses were sustained. Such live broadcasts were not only dangerous, but had some potential to backfire.

In April 1945, as the BBC's war correspondent, he accompanied the British 11th Armoured Division to the liberation of the Bergen-Belsen concentration camp making one of the first reports. His description of what he saw there was so graphic the BBC declined to broadcast his despatch for four days, relenting only when he threatened to resign. An edited version was eventually aired, with references to Jews removed:

I passed through the barrier, and found myself in the world of a nightmare. Dead bodies, some of them in decay, lay strewn about the road and along the rutted tracks [...] Inside the huts it was even worse. I've seen many terrible sights in the last five years, but nothing, nothing approaching the dreadful interior of this hut at Belsen. The dead and the dying lay close together. I picked my way over corpse after corpse in the gloom, until I heard one voice that rose above the gentle, undulating moaning. I found a girl. She was a living skeleton, impossible to gauge her age, for she had practically no hair left on her head, and her face was only a yellow parchment sheet, with two holes in it for eyes [...] Babies were born at Belsen, some of them shrunken, wizened little things that could not live because their mothers could not feed them. One woman, distraught to the point of madness, flung herself at a British soldier who was on guard in the camp on the night that it was reached by the 11th Armoured Division. She begged him to give her some milk, for the tiny baby she held in her arms. She lay the mite on the ground, threw herself at the sentry's feet and kissed his boots. And when, in his distress, he asked her to get up, she put the baby in his arms and ran off, crying that she would find milk for it because there was no milk in her breast. And when the soldier opened the bundle of rags to look at the child, he found that it had been dead for days [...] I have never seen British soldiers so moved to cold fury as the men who opened the Belsen camp this week, and those of the police and the RAMC, who are now on duty there trying to save the prisoners who are not too far gone in starvation.

His report was originally broadcast on 19 April 1945. The full text of his broadcast, which included reference to the 40,000 Jewish prisoners held in the camp, is entitled: 5 years on: Richard Dimbleby’s BBC report on the liberation of Belsen concentration camp.

He described, in another broadcast, the wrecked interior of Adolf Hitler's Reich Chancellery at the war's end.

=== Later broadcasting career ===
When Dimbleby concluded his war correspondent work for the BBC he was earning £1000 a year. The BBC forbade any external directorships while on their permanent staff so technically he resigned, however, he thereafter remained a permanent freelance, greatly increasing his earnings. He acquired full control of his family's newspapers, buying out his uncle, Percy Dimbleby. He also obtained a three year contract to write film scripts for Alexander Korda but this was never put to use. His first television broadcast was as a support to Freddie Grisewood to cover the Victory Day celebrations on 7 June 1946, which role he had specifically requested to the head of the BBC, Maurice Gorham.

After the war, Dimbleby switched to television, eventually becoming the BBC's leading news commentator. He is perhaps best remembered as the commentator on a number of major public occasions, including the coronation of Queen Elizabeth II in 1953 and the funerals of George VI, John F. Kennedy and Winston Churchill. He wrote a book about the coronation, Elizabeth Our Queen, which was given free to many schoolchildren at the time. He also wrote a London crime novel, Storm at the Hook, published in 1948.

He oversaw the first live international broadcast, as part of the centenary celebration of the first telegram being sent between France and England. Using the same underwater cable in the Channel on 28 August Dimbleby broadcast from outside Calais town hall. Thereafter he took part in the first Eurovision television relay in 1951 and appeared in the first live television broadcast from the Soviet Union in 1961. He also introduced a special programme in July 1962 showing the first live television signal from the United States via the Telstar satellite. In addition to heavyweight journalism, he took part in lighter sound radio programmes such as Twenty Questions (as a panel member) and Down Your Way (which he hosted).

From 1955, he was the host of the flagship current affairs series Panorama. This programme saw him use his journalistic skills to full advantage in conducting searching, but polite interviews with key figures of the day, while acting as an urbane presenter for the programme. He was able to maintain his reporting talents by visiting places like Berlin, standing in front of the Brandenburg Gate a week before the Berlin Wall was erected across it by the communist authorities of East Germany.

During his time with Panorama, Dimbleby narrated the spaghetti-tree hoax on 1 April 1957, as an April Fool's Day joke.

In 1958, Dimbleby was the commentator on the BBC's first ever broadcast from the House of Lords.

He made two return trips to Belsen at the BBC's request; firstly in the summer of 1959 as part of a documentary "After the Battle" following six correspondents in their previous footsteps; and in 1965, which also took in the huge nearby military camp at Hohne by which time the Bergen memorial had been set up.

Dimbleby's reputation was built upon his ability to describe events clearly yet with a sense of the drama and poetry of the many state occasions he covered. Examples included the lying-in-state of George VI in Westminster Hall, where he depicted the stillness of the guardsmen standing like statues at the four corners of the catafalque, or the description of the drums at Kennedy's funeral which, he said, "beat as the pulse of a man's heart." His commentary for the funeral of Churchill in January 1965 was the last state event he commentated upon.

In 1965, after commentating for half an hour on Elizabeth II's state visit in to Germany, Dimbleby uttered the expletive, "Jesus wept," unaware that the microphone was live, after discovering that the TV pictures had failed for all 30 minutes, meaning he would have to repeat the commentary.

== Private life and honours ==
Dimbleby married Dilys Thomas in Copthorne, West Sussex, in 1937. Dilys had been a reporter in the family newspaper firm and was the third daughter of a London barrister.

The couple had four children, two of whom, David and Jonathan, have followed in his footsteps to become major broadcasting figures in their own right, both hosting election night broadcasts (David on the BBC, Jonathan on ITN). In addition, Dimbleby's third son, Nicholas, sculpted the plaque in his father's name that was placed in Poets' Corner in 1990. They also had a daughter, Sally. Dilys Dimbleby died in 2009.

In June 1946, Dimbleby was appointed Officer of the Order of the British Empire (OBE) for services as a war correspondent. In the 1959 Queen's Birthday Honours, he was promoted to Commander of the Order of the British Empire (CBE).

== Death and legacy ==
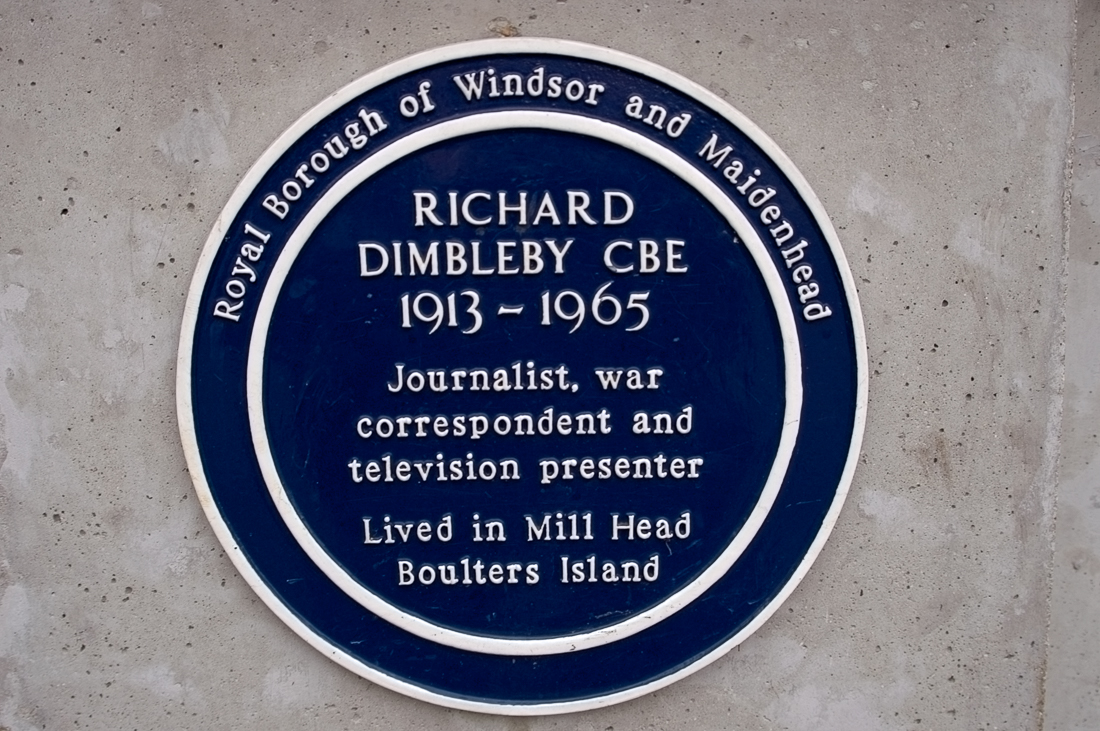
Blue plaque dedicated to Dimbleby at Boulter's Lock, Berkshire

In 1960, Dimbleby was diagnosed with testicular cancer. In 1962 he had presented a documentary on the links between heavy tobacco smoking and lung cancer. Dimbleby decided to reveal he was ill with cancer, which at the time, was a taboo disease to mention. On 22 December 1965, Dimbleby died, aged 52. A memorial service was held at Westminster Abbey on 4 January 1966, led by Dr Eric Abbott, Dean of Westminster and Dr George Reindorp, Bishop of Guildford. The plaque to his memory stands in the south aisle of the abbey.

It was helpful in building public consciousness of the disease and investing more resources in finding a cure. The Richard Dimbleby Cancer Fund was founded in his memory. Dimbleby was cremated, the ceremony receiving national publicity.

In 1986 "Celebration of a Broadcaster", commemorating Dimbleby, was held in Westminster Abbey. In April 2013, he was honoured by the Royal Mail, as one of six people selected as subjects for the "Great Britons" commemorative postage stamp issue.

=== Richard Dimbleby Lecture ===
The Richard Dimbleby Lecture was founded in his memory in 1972 and is delivered every year by an influential public figure. Speakers have included:

- 2004 – Sir James Dyson
- 2005 – The Lord Blair of Boughton
- 2006 – Sir Mike Jackson
- 2007 – Craig Venter
- 2009 – Prince Charles
- 2010 – Sir Terry Pratchett
- 2011 – Sir Michael Morpurgo
- 2012 – Sir Paul Nurse
- 2013 – Bill Gates
- 2014 – Christine Lagarde
- 2015 – The Baroness Lane-Fox of Soho
- 2016 – Sir Gregory Doran
- 2017 – John Brennan
- 2018 – Jeanette Winterson
- 2019 – Sir Tim Berners-Lee
- 2021 – Dame Sarah Gilbert
- 2023 – David Harewood
- 2025 – Sir Gareth Southgate
