= The Prince of Wales: A Biography =

1994 authorised biography of Charles, Prince of Wales by Jonathan Dimbleby

- First edition
- Author: Jonathan Dimbleby
- Language: English
- Genre: Biography
- Publisher: Little, Brown and Company
- Publication date: 3 November 1994
- Media type: Print
- Pages: 620
- ISBN: 9780316910163

The Prince of Wales: A Biography is an authorised biography of Charles, Prince of Wales (later King Charles III), written by Jonathan Dimbleby. The book was serialised in The Sunday Times ahead of Queen Elizabeth II's state visit to Russia.

The book draws on interviews with Charles and his circle, as well as his journals, diaries and letters, with Dimbleby interpreting the material independently. It covers Charles's upbringing and his relationships with Queen Elizabeth II and Prince Philip, his marriage to Diana, Princess of Wales, and his public duties and personal reflections. The biography attracted widespread media attention in Britain and abroad for revealing personal details about the royal family, including Charles's criticisms of his parents, and was seen as part of a broader wave of intimate royal publications in the 1990s.

== Background and writing ==
Jonathan Dimbleby conducted interviews with Prince Charles and his circle, and was given access to his journals, diaries and letters, though a palace spokesperson insisted that he had come to his own interpretations from the material provided. A documentary presented by Dimbleby on Charles, titled Charles: The Private Man, the Public Role, had aired earlier in June 1994 in which Charles had admitted to adultery after his marriage to Diana, Princess of Wales became broken down. The idea for the book reportedly came about following Laurens van der Post's advice to Charles to "get in touch" with his soul and in the aftermath of his wife's biography, Diana: Her True Story, in which he was heavily criticised.

In the book, Charles's parents, Queen Elizabeth II and Prince Philip, were described as physically and emotionally distant, with Philip criticised for disregarding his son's sensitive nature, including insisting that he attend Gordonstoun, where he was bullied. The book further alleged that Philip publicly humiliated Charles and reduced him to tears as a child and youngster and forced him into the marriage with Lady Diana Spencer. Among other topics discussed were Diana's mood swings and depressions.

== Reception ==
The book drew immense attention in the British tabloid media and Prince Philip implied in an interview with The Daily Telegraph that he disapproved of his son's decision to go public with intimate details of his life, "I've never discussed private matters and I don't think the Queen has either. Very few members of the family have". Charles released a statement on 16 October 1994, stating that he had "no regrets" over his decision to green light the book. Diana was reportedly "numb" after revelations in the book that her husband never loved her, and a friend of hers told the Daily Mirror, "She can hardly believe what her husband has done to her". Prime Minister John Major defended the institution of the monarchy, stating "The monarchy is very sound, very stable. It is an enduring part of our life and it always will remain so". There were reports that figures within the Conservative Party had urged the Prime Minister to advise the Queen that the Prince and Princess of Wales should get a divorce.

The Daily Mail questioned "Can he ever be king after this?" and the Daily Mirror described the work as the prince's "Crowning act of treachery" and added "The royals must stop washing their dirty linen in public. Stop trying to justify their failings. Stop trying to score points off each other". The Guardian described the book as a "misguided and sorry authorised version" and Charles's story as "suffocatingly self-absorbed". The New York Times pointed out that both this book and Diana: Her New Life by Andrew Morton shared an essential approach: "a determination to create sympathy for their subjects by depicting them as hapless victims". British author and historian David Cannadine argued that The Prince of Wales: A Biography was an overly long, insufficiently critical, and historically shallow work that stayed too close to its subject, ultimately undermining its attempt to present Prince Charles as a figure of distinction. In the Los Angeles Times, Margo Kaufman described the biography as "tirelessly fawning", and criticised Dimbleby for focusing on Charles's personal reflections while glossing over his affair with Camilla Parker Bowles.
