= David Dimbleby =

British commentator and presenter (born 1938)

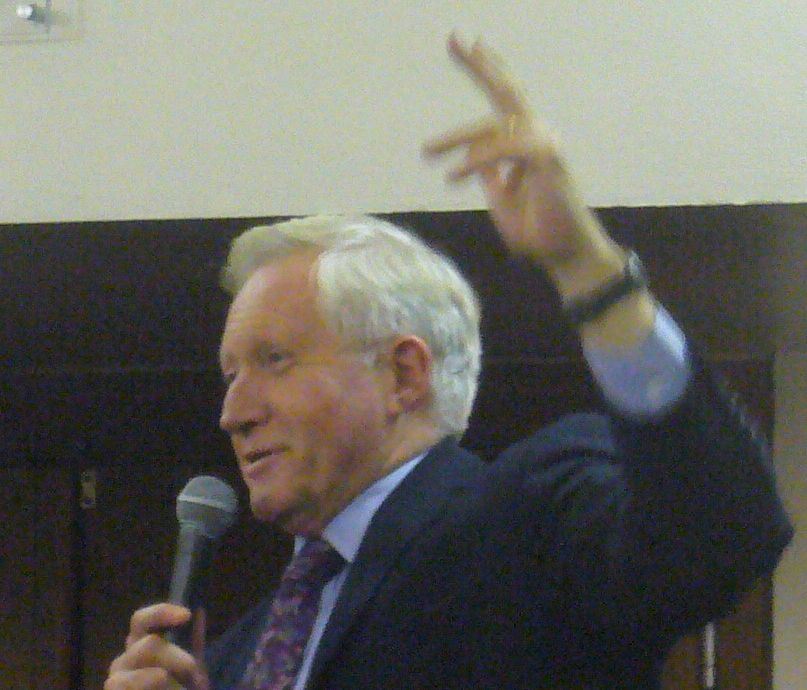
- Dimbleby in 2007
- Born: 28 October 1938 (age 88); East Sheen, Surrey, England
- Education: Charterhouse School; Christ Church, Oxford
- Occupations: Television presenter, journalist, political commentator
- Years active: 1962–present
- Employer: BBC
- Agent: Rosemary Scoular at United Agents
- Known for: BBC Question Time Presenter; BBC UK General Election Night Anchor/Commentator; BBC National Events Anchor/Commentator
- Spouses: Josceline Gaskell (m. 1967; div. 2000) Belinda Giles (m. 2000)
- Children: 4; including Henry and Kate
- Parent(s): Richard Dimbleby; Dilys Thomas
- Relatives: Dimbleby family
- David Dimbleby's voice Recorded February 2008 from the BBC Radio 4 programme Desert Island Discs

David Dimbleby (born 28 October 1938) is an English journalist and former presenter of current affairs and political programmes, best known for having presented the BBC topical debate programme Question Time. He is the son of broadcaster Richard Dimbleby and elder brother of Jonathan Dimbleby, of the Dimbleby family.

Long involved in the coverage of national events, Dimbleby hosted the BBC Election Night coverage from 1979 to 2017, as well as United States presidential elections on the BBC until 2016. He has also presented and narrated documentary series on architecture and history.

== Early life and education ==
Dimbleby was born in East Sheen, Surrey, the son of the journalist and Second World War war correspondent Richard Dimbleby, by his marriage to Dilys Thomas, from Wales. He had three siblings: two brothers, Jonathan Dimbleby, also a television current affairs presenter, and Nicholas (died 2024), and a sister, Sally. David Dimbleby was educated at two independent schools, the Glengorse School in Battle, East Sussex, and Charterhouse in Godalming, Surrey, where he was a contemporary of the journalist Adam Raphael.

The two younger Dimblebys both made their television débuts in the 1950s in the BBC's first holiday programme Passport, at a time when the whole family would visit resorts in Switzerland or Brittany. A holiday programme for the home counties, called No Passport, was also broadcast.

After learning French in Paris and Italian in Perugia, Dimbleby read Philosophy, politics and economics at Christ Church, Oxford and graduated with a third-class degree. While at Oxford he was President of the Christ Church Junior Common Room, a member of the Bullingdon Club, a socially exclusive student dining and drinking society, and was also editor of the student magazine Isis.

== Career ==
=== Early career ===
Dimbleby joined the BBC as a news reporter in Bristol in the 1960s and has appeared in news programmes since 1962, early on co-presenting the televised version of the school quiz Top of the Form, and was a reporter on the BBC's coverage of the 1964 general election with his father as linkman. Richard Dimbleby died the following year.

On 24 July 1967, Dimbleby was one of seventy signatories to an advertisement in The Times advocating the decriminalisation of cannabis use, which had been written by campaigner Stephen Abrams. An incident in 1969 led to Dimbleby, then freelance, being called in by the BBC's Director of Television. During U.S. President Richard Nixon's visit to the UK, a reference by Dimbleby to UK and US government heads' "expensively hired" press secretaries "whose job is to disguise the truth" was given much attention by the British press.

Dimbleby became involved in a number of projects that combined his established role as presenter and interviewer with documentary making. An early example of this was Yesterday's Men (1971), a film which the BBC recognises "ridiculed" the Labour opposition and led to a major conflict between the Corporation and the Labour Party; Dimbleby had his name removed from the credits because of the concessions that were made. In 1974, he became the presenter of Panorama, which had been presented by his father.

=== Coverage of elections ===
Dimbleby anchored the BBC's overnight coverage of the 1979 general election, and continued in this role until the 2017 general election, for a total of ten general elections. In addition to election coverage, he also hosted BBC Budget specials, and was a presenter of the BBC early evening weekday current affairs series Nationwide. During the same period (beginning in 1979), Dimbleby has also been the anchor for the BBC's European Parliament election results programmes and in 2008 and 2012, anchored the BBC's coverage of the US election night.

Dimbleby was the main presenter of the BBC's political series This Week Next Week (1984–88), broadcast on Sunday early afternoons, as a competitor to ITV's established Weekend World series. As early as 1987, he was a contender for the position of Director-General of the BBC (losing out to Michael Checkland). This Week Next Week was replaced in 1988 by the On the Record, a political series presented until 1993 by his younger brother, Jonathan Dimbleby. Meanwhile, he continued to work in documentaries, including The White Tribe of Africa (1979), an award-winning four-part history of South Africa's Afrikaans community and the rise of apartheid, An Ocean Apart (1988), an examination of the history of Anglo-American relations, and Rebellion! (1999), a history of Britain's troubled relations with Zimbabwe.

By this time, Dimbleby was established as the anchor for the BBC's coverage of events of national importance, such as the State Opening of Parliament, the Trooping the Colour, and the National Service of Remembrance service at the Cenotaph in Whitehall.

Dimbleby served as chairman of the BBC's Thursday evening topical debate programme Question Time from 1994 until 2018. One of the most memorable moments from Question Time was when Dimbleby accidentally referred to Robin Cook as "Robin Cock", to which Cook responded by jokingly referring to Dimbleby as "David Bumblebee".

=== 2000s ===
In 1999, Dimbleby opened 2000 Today, the BBC's coverage of the millennium celebrations, from Greenwich, England. He commentated on the funerals of Diana, Princess of Wales in 1997, Queen Elizabeth the Queen Mother in 2002 and former Prime Minister Margaret Thatcher in 2013, as well as the state visit of US President George W. Bush to the UK in 2003. In 2002, Dimbleby hosted the Golden Jubilee of Queen Elizabeth II coverage. A profile by Ben Summerskill for The Observer in 2001 quoted an unnamed former Cabinet Minister who had observed Dimbleby's career for many decades: "I suspect he has an almost medieval view, that the Queen governs through Parliament... There are a few quarrels among the subjects – over which he presides very capably – but they have very little to do with what Britain is really about." Dimbleby, though, has himself criticised what he sees as archaic elements of the State Opening of Parliament.

David Dimbleby was chairman of the Dimbleby Newspaper Group, former publishers of the Richmond and Twickenham Times, acquired by the Newsquest Media Group in 2001 for a reported £12,000,000.

There were reports in 2004 that Dimbleby was shortlisted for the chairmanship of the BBC. However, the position was eventually awarded to Michael Grade. Dimbleby was a contender for the chairmanship in the corporation's tumultuous period following 2001, which went to Gavyn Davies. He has instead remained, according to Mark Duguid for the BFI's screenonline website, best known for his "gravitas, journalistic integrity and consummate professionalism" and as "a paragon of impartiality" as a narrator and moderator, of British politics.

In 2005, he hosted a BBC One series, A Picture of Britain, celebrating British and Irish paintings, poetry, music and landscapes. In June 2007, he wrote and presented a follow-up, the BBC series, How We Built Britain, in which he explored the history of British architecture by visiting a region of Britain and its historic buildings each week. David Dimbleby also presented a new series on BBC One, Seven Ages of Britain. In early editions of the programme, he looked at the Bayeux Tapestry and exhibits to do with Thomas Becket.

On 12 November 2009, Dimbleby missed his first Question Time in more than fifteen years, having been taken to hospital as a precaution after being briefly knocked out by a rearing bullock at his farm in Sussex.

=== 2010s ===
Dimbleby hosted the third of three televised election debates featuring the leaders of the three main political parties held in the run-up to the 2010 general election. On the night of the 2010 general election, Dimbleby hosted the BBC coverage, along with Jeremy Vine, Jeremy Paxman, Nick Robinson, and Emily Maitlis. Presenting from BBC Television Centre Studio 1, he was an anchor, and involved in commentary contributions, guest interviews and introducing live outside broadcasts. In 2013, Dimbleby presented Britain and the Sea and a year later, he presented The European Union: In or Out. In 2015, Dimbleby hosted the first BBC general election debate, in spite of the fact that neither Prime Minister David Cameron nor Deputy Prime Minister Nick Clegg took part.

Dimbleby hosted the EU referendum results show on BBC One, BBC News and BBC World News overnight on 23–24 June 2016, when the UK became the first and only country to vote to leave the European Union. In this programme, he made the following quote to the country when the BBC released its forecast for a Leave win at 04:40 BST:

Well, at twenty minutes to five we can now say the decision taken in 1975 by this country to join the Common Market has been reversed by this referendum to leave the EU. We are absolutely clear now that there is no way that the Remain side can win. It looks as if the gap is going to be something like 52 to 48...so a four point lead for leaving the EU, and that is the result of this referendum which has been preceded by weeks and months of argument and dispute and all the rest of it. The British people have spoken and the answer is: we're out!

On 20 April 2017, the BBC announced that Dimbleby would host their coverage of the 2017 general election, despite having previously said that the 2015 general election would be his last. On 17 June 2018, the BBC announced that Dimbleby would leave Question Time after 25 years at the end of that year. On 7 December 2018, the BBC announced that Fiona Bruce would take over presenting duties from January 2019. Since his retirement from Question Time, Dimbleby has presented occasional documentaries for the BBC.

=== Post-Question Time ===
In 2019, and in some of his first work outside the BBC for decades, Dimbleby presented an acclaimed series of podcasts on the life of media mogul Rupert Murdoch entitled The Sun King. This focused on various key moments in Murdoch's professional career such as his takeover of newspapers around the world, Fox News, his battles with print unions and the phone hacking scandal. It also attempts to examine Murdoch's personal motivations and his political influence.

In 2020, Dimbleby continued his foray into podcasting, presenting a series on the lead-up to the Iraq War. The series examined the events in the lead-up to the 2003 invasion asking whether it was justified at the time, and whether it could have been avoided. It also closely analysed the relationship between George W. Bush and Tony Blair, with Blair being interviewed as part of the series.

In October 2020, Dimbleby said he was again considering putting his name forward for chairman of the BBC.

In September 2022, Dimbleby came out of retirement to commentate on the state funeral of Queen Elizabeth II for the BBC, in particular for the committal service at St George's Chapel, Windsor. In 2023 and 2024, he also continued his long standing role as BBC narrator of the National Service of Remembrance at the Cenotaph.

In October 2022, Dimbleby stated that the BBC does not appropriately question the power of the royal family. He said that the BBC would not address controversial topics to do with the monarchy, such as its ability to change tax legislation, or the fact that the Duchy of Cornwall does not pay capital gains tax, and stated his disagreement that such matters were not examined. He also stated his shock over the amount of control the monarchy have over state broadcasting.

== Personal life ==
Although the brothers presented election coverage on competing channels, when asked in an interview about rival ITV's plans to include a riverboat party with the likes of Kevin Spacey and Richard Branson in their 2005 election broadcast, Dimbleby commented, "They've got Jonathan Dimbleby, what do they need Kevin Spacey for?".

Dimbleby has three children with his first wife, Josceline Dimbleby, a cookery writer: Liza, an artist; Henry, a chef and co-founder of the fast-food chain Leon; and Kate, a jazz and folk singer.

In 2000, Dimbleby married Belinda Giles, a granddaughter of Herbrand Sackville, 9th Earl De La Warr, with whom he has a son, Fred, born in February 1998. Dimbleby lives in Folkington, near Polegate, East Sussex, and Pimlico, London. He previously had a home in Dittisham, near Dartmouth, Devon. He is a supporter of Tranmere Rovers.

Dimbleby's memoir, Keep Talking, was published in 2022.

== Honours ==
In 1998, Dimbleby won a Richard Dimbleby BAFTA for Best presenter at the 1998 British Academy Television Awards. Dimbleby was made an honorary graduate of the University of Essex in 2005, and was the President of the Institute for Citizenship. In 2019, he received the Special Recognition Award for his services to news and current affairs at the National Television Awards in London.

== See also ==
- List of former BBC newsreaders and journalists
- List of longest-serving British television presenters
- List of Have I Got News for You presenters
- List of Today programme guest editors
- List of alumni of Christ Church, Oxford
- List of University of Oxford people with PPE degrees
- List of Old Carthusians

Media offices
Preceded by Peter Sissons	Regular Host of Question Time; 1994–2018	Succeeded by Fiona Bruce
Preceded by Alastair Burnet as host until 1974	Host of BBC Election Night Coverage; 1979–2017	Succeeded by Huw Edwards as host from 2017
