= A Picture of Britain =

2005 British television documentary series

- Written by: David Dimbleby
- Directed by: Sally Benton; Nicky Illis
- Presented by: David Dimbleby
- Starring: John Lundberg; Vera Lynn; Lady Mary Soames
- Theme music composer: Andrew Blaney
- Country of origin: United Kingdom
- Original language: English
- No. of seasons: 1
- No. of episodes: 6

Production
- Executive producer: Basil Comely
- Producer: Sally Benton
- Cinematography: Fred Fabre; Mike Garner; Chris Hartley
- Editors: Andrea Carnevali; Joanna Crickmay
- Running time: 57 minutes
- Production company: BBC

Original release
- Network: BBC One
- Release: 5 June – 10 July 2005

A Picture of Britain is a 2005 BBC Television documentary series presented by David Dimbleby, which describes the British landscape and the art which it has inspired. In each of the six 1-hour episodes Dimbleby explores a different British region and discusses the ways that its landscape and culture have influenced painters, poets and composers.

== Episodes ==
1. The Romantic North (5 June 2005)
2. The Flatlands (12 June 2005)
3. Highlands and Glens (19 June 2005)
4. The Heart of England (26 June 2005)
5. The Home Front (3 July 2005)
6. The Mystical West (10 July 2005)

== Production ==
The series is shot in 16:9 widescreen.

The series was produced in association with Tate Britain, who held a similarly named exhibition to accompany the TV series. In addition Dimbleby authored an accompanying book, which was published by Tate Publishing.

=== DVD release ===
The region 2 DVD release of the series is by Contender Home Entertainment. It has also been packaged as part of a box set together with series 1 of Coast.
