= Bel Mooney =

English journalist and broadcaster (born 1946)

Beryl Ann "Bel" Mooney (born 8 October 1946) is an English journalist and broadcaster. As of 2025, she currently writes a column for the Daily Mail, having previously written – mainly as a columnist – for other publications including the Daily Mirror, The Times (2005–07), The Sunday Times (1982–83) and The Listener.

She has written a number of fiction and non-fiction books and was instrumental in the foundation of the Stillbirth Society, now known as Sands.

== Early life ==
Mooney was born in Broadgreen Hospital, Liverpool, to Gladys (née Norbury) and Edward Mooney. She spent her earliest years in Liverpool on a council estate called The Green on Queens Drive. She passed her 11-plus and went to Aigburth Vale High School for Girls. At the age of fourteen Mooney moved to Wiltshire, where her parents bought their first house. She then attended school in Trowbridge, Wiltshire, at Trowbridge Girls' High School (a girls' grammar school which merged with a boys' grammar school to become the comprehensive The John of Gaunt School in 1974). Mooney passed eight O levels and took English, Latin and Art at A level. She applied unsuccessfully to the University of Oxford (at that time nobody from her school had been admitted to Oxford), before going on to study English Language and Literature at University College London (UCL), where she obtained a first in 1969. She was made a fellow of UCL in 1994.

== Career ==
=== Journalism ===
Upon graduating from university Mooney worked as a freelance journalist. From 1979 to 1980 she was a columnist on the Daily Mirror. She has also been a regular columnist for The Times (2005–07), The Sunday Times (1982–83) and The Listener (1984–86).

=== As an author ===
Mooney is the author of the Kitty and Friends series of stories for young girls. Her novel for children The Voices of Silence won a New York Public Library citation and was shortlisted for a gold medal in the State of California.

As well as fiction, Mooney has written many other books, including Bel Mooney's Somerset (1989) and a memoir about love, loss, recovery – and dogs: Small Dogs Can Save Your Life (2010).

== Personal life ==
Mooney met Jonathan Dimbleby while they were both working on the student newspaper Pi. They married in February 1968 in Kensington, after knowing each other for four months. Mooney was married to Dimbleby for 38 years until their divorce in 2006. Mooney and Dimbleby have two adult children, Kitty (born 1980), a freelance journalist and charity consultant, and Daniel (born 1974), a television producer/director. They also had a son, Tom, who was stillborn in 1975. On 8 September 2007, Mooney married Robin Allison-Smith, formerly a freelance photographer, now a businessman, with whom she lives on the outskirts of Bath, Somerset.

== Charitable activities ==
Mooney is a co-founder and patron of Sands, which describes itself as "the leading stillbirth and neonatal death charity in the UK." Mooney and Hazelanne Lewis both gave birth to stillborn babies in the 1970s, and Mooney wrote an article for The Guardian, in which she described how "At that time in the UK, most parents were not allowed to see or hold their babies, no photographs were taken, parents were not told where their babies were buried, and they could not put their baby’s name on the stillbirth certificate." When "Hazelanne then wrote to national newspapers asking bereaved parents to contact her and share their stories" the torrent of response led to the charity being founded, initially as the Stillbirth Association.

== Bibliography ==
- The Anderson Question
- Bel Mooney's Somerset
- The Fourth of July
- Lost Footsteps
- The Windsurf Boy
- The Year of the Child
- Intimate Letters
- The Stove Haunting
- I'm Bored!, the 10th in the "Kitty" series for younger children
