= Jonathan Dimbleby =

British television presenter and journalist (born 1944)

- Dimbleby in 2016
- Born: 31 July 1944 (age 82); Aylesbury, Buckinghamshire, England
- Education: Royal Agricultural College; University College, London
- Occupations: Writer, broadcaster
- Years active: 1969–present
- Spouses: Bel Mooney (m. 1968; div. 2006) Jessica Ray (m. 2007)
- Children: 4
- Parent(s): Richard Dimbleby; Dilys Thomas
- Relatives: Dimbleby family

Jonathan Dimbleby (born 31 July 1944) is a British presenter of current affairs and political radio and television programmes, author and historian. He is the son of Richard Dimbleby and younger brother of television presenter David Dimbleby.

== Education ==
Dimbleby was educated at Charterhouse, a boys' independent school in Surrey. He later studied farm management at the Royal Agricultural College and graduated in 1965. He then studied philosophy at University College, London. He was later elected an honorary fellow but resigned in 2015 in protest at the forced resignation of Tim Hunt as an honorary fellow.

In July 2007 he received an honorary degree from the University of Exeter. He is an Honorary Fellow of Bath Spa University (2006) and holds an honorary doctorate from the University of the West of England (2018).

== TV and radio career ==
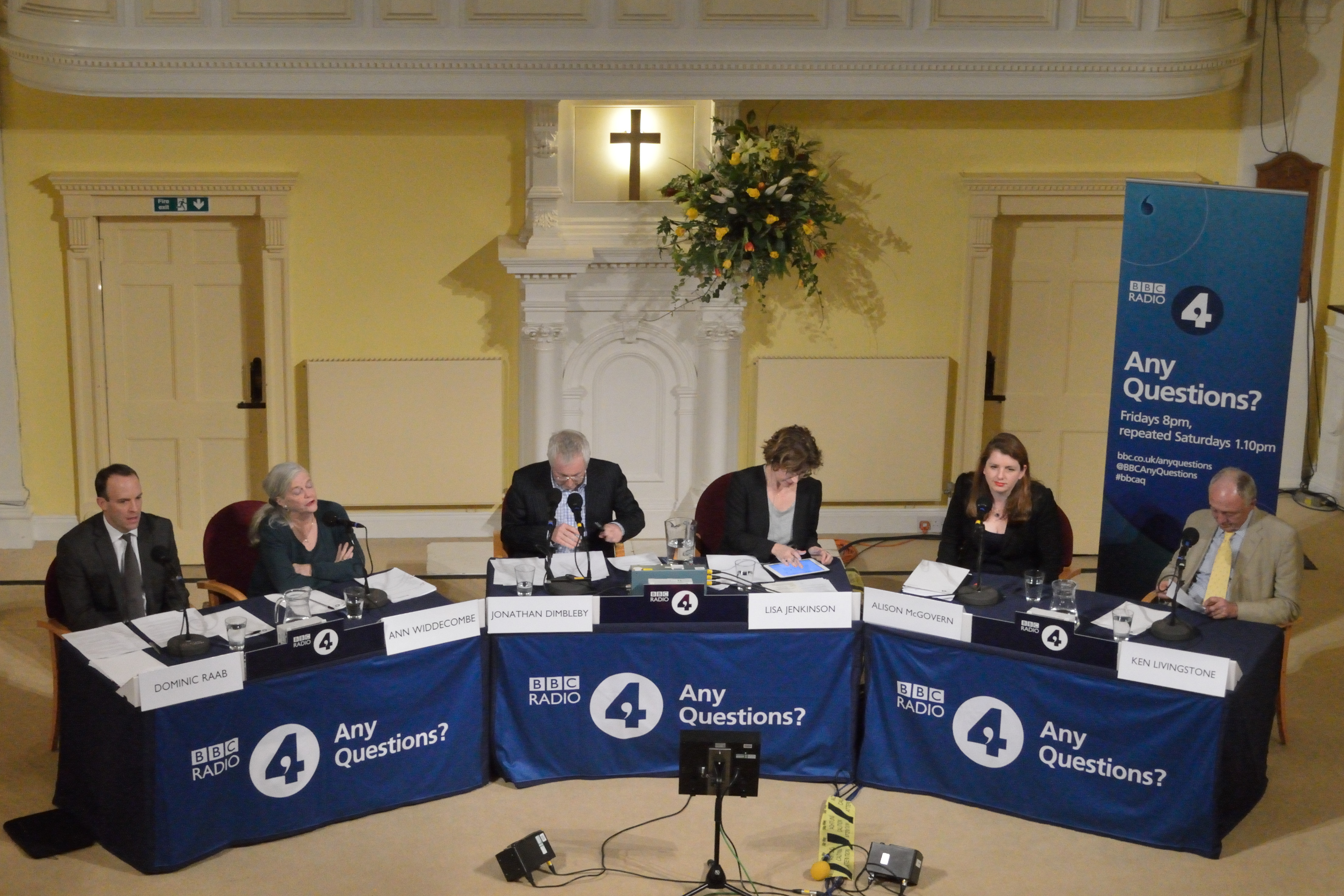
Dimbleby presenting an Any Questions? broadcast on 15 January 2016 at the Nexus Methodist Church, Bath, during the church's 200th anniversary year

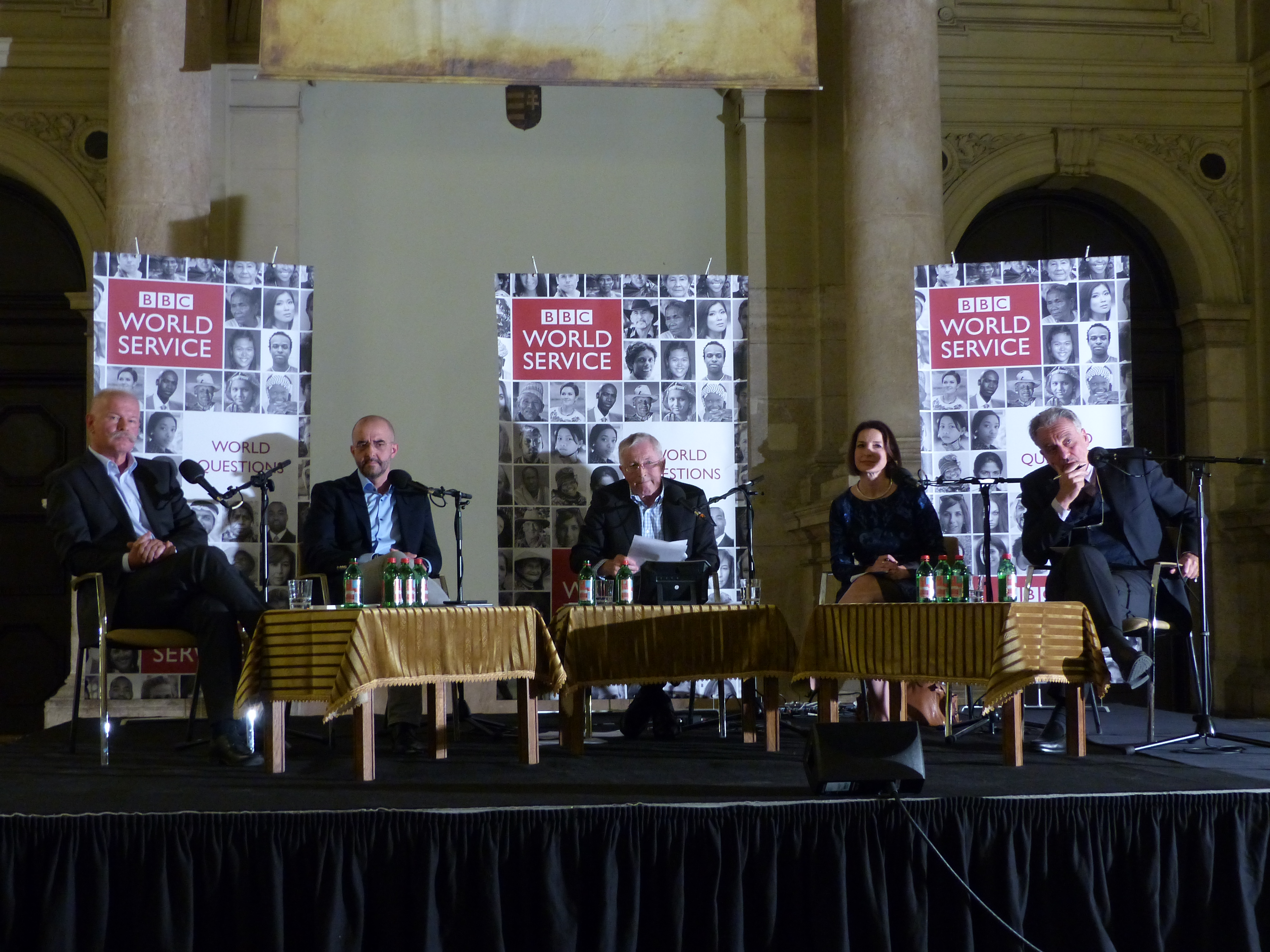
Dimbleby presenting a World Question broadcast from Budapest

Dimbleby began his career at the BBC in Bristol in 1969. In 1970 he joined The World at One as a reporter, where he also presented The World This Weekend. In 1972 he joined ITV's flagship current affairs programme This Week and over the following six years reported on crises in many parts of the world. His coverage of the 1973 Ethiopian famine, The Unknown Famine, was followed by TV and radio appeals which raised a record sum nationally and internationally. His report, for which he won the SFTA Richard Dimbleby Award, was used by the incoming regime to justify the overthrow of the Ethiopian Emperor Haile Selassie.

In 1978 he wrote and presented the ITV series Jonathan Dimbleby in South America. In 1979 he joined Yorkshire Television, where he wrote and presented three ITV network series: Jonathan Dimbleby In Search of the American Dream (1976), The Bomb (1979), The Eagle and The Bear (1980) and The Cold War Game (1981). He also presented the ITV documentary series First Tuesday. In 1985 he joined TV-am as presenter of Jonathan Dimbleby on Sunday. In 1986 he returned to ITV as presenter of This Week.

In 1988 he joined the BBC to present the new flagship political programme On the Record (1988–1993). He wrote, presented and co-produced two documentary series: The Last Governor (BBC1, 1997) about the final five years of British rule in Hong Kong, and Charles: The Private Man, the Public Role (ITV, 1994), in which (the then) Prince Charles spoke about his first marriage and his relationship with Camilla Parker Bowles, now his wife and queen consort of the United Kingdom.

From 1994 to 2006 he presented ITV's political programme, Jonathan Dimbleby. He anchored ITV's general election coverage in 1997, 2001 and 2005. He wrote and presented Russia with Jonathan Dimbleby (BBC2, 2008), An African Journey with Jonathan Dimbleby (2010), and A South American Journey with Jonathan Dimbleby (2011). In 2013 he wrote and presented Churchill's Desert War (BBC2) based on his book, Destiny in The Desert. In 2015 he wrote and presented the two-part series The BBC At War (BBC2).

From 1987 to June 2019 he presented Any Questions? on BBC Radio 4. He presented Any Answers? from 1989 to 2012. From 2016 to 2019, he was the main presenter of the BBC World Service monthly series World Questions.

In April 2020, Dimbleby wrote and presented the ITV documentary Return to Belsen with Jonathan Dimbleby about the Bergen-Belsen concentration camp.

In 2022, following the death of Queen Elizabeth II, Dimbleby wrote and presented the documentary Charles, the Monarch and the Man, which aired on ITV on 13 September 2022. Dimbleby has been described in the media as "confidant of King Charles".

== Other work ==
Dimbleby wanted to be a farmer when he left school and worked on the Royal Farm, Windsor, trained as a professional showjumper and studied at the Royal Agricultural College (now University) at Cirencester. From 1993 until 2004 he ran an organic farm near Bath, Somerset.

He is a past president of Voluntary Service Overseas (VSO), of the Campaign to Protect Rural England (CPRE), of the Soil Association and of the RSPB. He is chair of the Richard Dimbleby Cancer Fund, the charity established in 1966 in memory of his father. He was chairman of the Index on Censorship's Board of Trustees from 2008 until 2013, when he was succeeded by David Aaronovitch. He is patron of several other charities.

== Family ==
Dimbleby is the son of the Second World War war correspondent Richard Dimbleby, who was later to become presenter of the BBC TV current affairs programme Panorama. His elder brother David Dimbleby is also a commentator on current affairs and presenter of BBC programmes. Jonathan wrote a biography of his father in 1975.

Dimbleby married author, journalist, and broadcaster Bel Mooney in 1968. They have two children: Kitty, a journalist; and Daniel, a television producer. In May 2003, Dimbleby began a relationship with the soprano Susan Chilcott, with whom he lived until her death from breast cancer in September 2003. Later that year Dimbleby and Mooney separated, and in 2006 they were divorced. In 2007 Dimbleby married Jessica Ray. They have two daughters, Daisy and Gwendolen, and live in Bristol.

== Awards and honours ==
- 1974 Richard Dimbleby Award, for outstanding contribution to factual television
- 1996 Sony Radio Award for BBC Radio 4's Any Questions programme
- 2013 Hessell-Tiltman Prize, shortlist for Destiny in the Desert

== Writing and other activities ==
- Richard Dimbleby: A Biography (1975)
- The Palestinians (1978)
- The Prince of Wales: A Biography (1994)
- The Last Governor: Chris Patten and the Handover of Hong Kong (1997)
- Russia: A Journey to the Heart of a Land and Its People (2008).
- Destiny in the Desert: The Road to El Alamein (2012).
- The Battle of the Atlantic: How the Allies Won the War (2015)
- Barbarossa: How Hitler Lost the War (2021)
- Endgame 1944: How Stalin Won the War (2024)
