= McEvedy =

McEvedy is a surname. Notable people with the surname include:

- Allegra McEvedy (born 1970), English chef, broadcaster and writer
- Colin McEvedy (1930–2005), English writer, historian, psychiatrist and cartographer
- Pat McEvedy (1880–1935), New Zealand rugby union player
