= John Vincent (restaurateur) =

British entrepreneur (born 1971)

John Vincent MBE
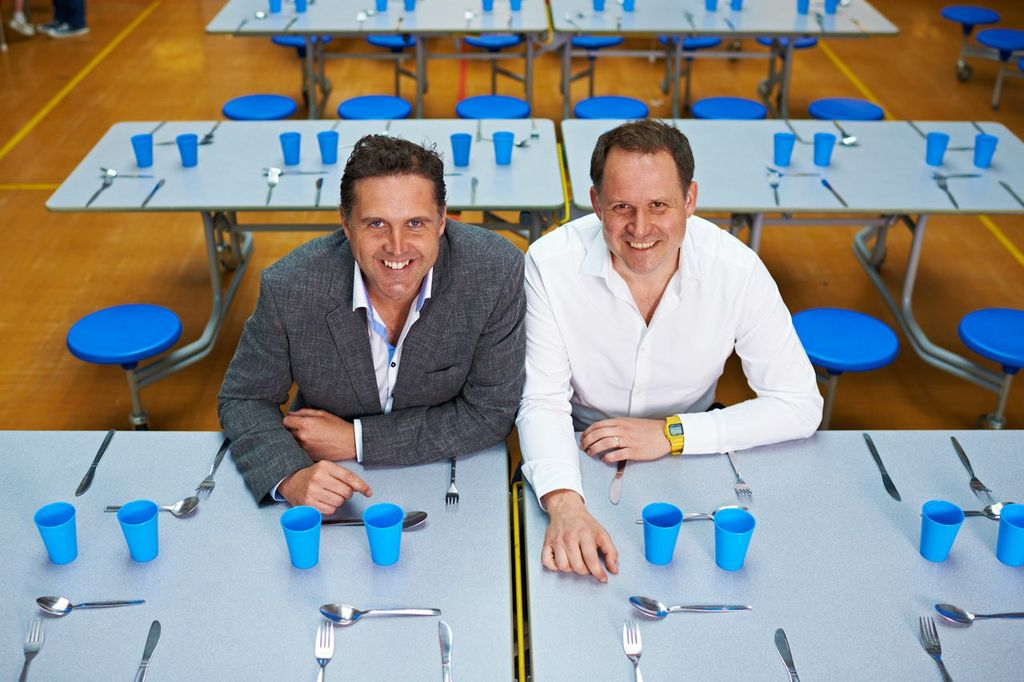
- John Vincent (left) with his Leon Restaurants co-founder, Henry Dimbleby
- Born: 28 September 1971 (age 54); London Borough of Enfield, England, United Kingdom
- Education: Haberdashers' Aske's Boys' School
- Alma mater: St John's College, Cambridge
- Occupations: Chief Executive and co-founder of Leon Restaurants
- Spouse: Katie Derham (m. 1999)
- Children: 2

John Vincent MBE (born 28 September 1971) is a British entrepreneur who is the chief executive and co-founder of fast food chain Leon Restaurants. Vincent is also known for his work in developing the 2013 School Food Plan, for which he was appointed an MBE; for chairing the Council for Sustainable Business; and for co-authoring seven LEON cookbooks.

== Early life ==
Vincent was born in Enfield, London and grew up in North London. He attended Haberdashers' Aske's Boys' School, a private school in North London, and went on to read History at St John's College, Cambridge, where he obtained a first class degree. While at university, Vincent had his own entertainment production company, setting up and hosting dance and music events.

== Career ==
In 1993, following his graduation, Vincent went on to work at Procter & Gamble (P&G) in sales & marketing. In 1997, after four years at P&G, he moved to management consultancy firm Bain & Co. where he remained for the next seven years.

From 2004 until 2007, Vincent was part of a team of three that worked on the whisky and spirits business Whyte & Mackay during its rebranding and business transition under the ownership of Vivian Imerman.

== Leon Restaurants ==
It was while working at Bain & Co. that the idea for LEON was first developed:

I sat down with a colleague of mine at the time, Henry Dimbleby, and we decided to write down five business ideas each. Good fast food was common on both lists. Henry had a vision of doing it in bowls. I had a vision of doing it more like McDonald's. Eventually we decided to go down the McDonald's route. The idea was simple: "If God did fast food." – John Vincent.

In 2004, joined by chef Allegra McEvedy as third co-founder, the first LEON restaurant was opened, at Carnaby Street, central London. A year after opening, LEON was named "Best New Restaurant in the UK" by The Observer. In 2013, it became a founding member of the Sustainable Restaurant Association (SRA), and in 2018 was awarded the Association's top ranking of three stars; in 2017 it won Raymond Blanc's Sustainability Hero award at the Association's "Food Made Good" awards. Leon Restaurants was also named in the 2017 Sunday Times Fast Track 100.

In 2014, Vincent took over day-to-day running of LEON, moving into the role of Chief Executive Officer. Dimbleby left Leon Restaurants' board in 2017. LEON has since expanded internationally and launched its own cookware and tableware ranges.

== The School Food Plan ==
In 2013, Vincent and Dimbleby were asked to lead an independent review, commissioned by the UK Government, of the school food programme. As part of that work, they went on to produce an actionable plan called "The School Food Plan". The plan formed the basis of revised rules on school dinners for pupils throughout the UK.

The plan has overseen, among other changes, the introduction of cookery lessons for all children up to the age of 14, universal free school meals for infants, and new standards for the food served to children in schools.

The School Food Plan has improved the diet of five million students and served daily across 22,000 schools. Vincent and Dimbleby were both appointed MBE in 2015 for services to school food. In 2017, Vincent received the Sustainable Restaurant Association's Raymond Blanc Sustainability Hero award along with Dimbleby for their work on the plan.

== Council for Sustainable Business ==
In 2018, Vincent was invited to help create and then chair the Council for Sustainable Business. The council was established to "inspire British business to protect and improve the environment", and to advise on how businesses can help achieve the aims of the 25 Year Environment Plan.

== Books and newspaper column ==
Vincent wrote a column for Metro in 2014 and 2015, and has co-authored and published seven LEON cookbooks; they include:

- Book 2, Naturally Fast Food
- Book 4, Family & Friends
- Book 6, Fast & Free
- Book 7, Fast Vegan
- Happy Salads
- Happy Soups
- Happy One-Pot Cooking

He is co-author of a book, Winning Not Fighting, with Wing Tsun martial arts master Julian Hitch, published in 2019.

== Personal life ==
Vincent married broadcaster Katie Derham in 1999; he proposed on the night they met. They have two daughters and live near Haywards Heath, Sussex. He was appointed MBE in the 2015 Birthday Honours.
