= Henry Dimbleby =

British businessman and cookery writer

Henry Dimbleby MBE
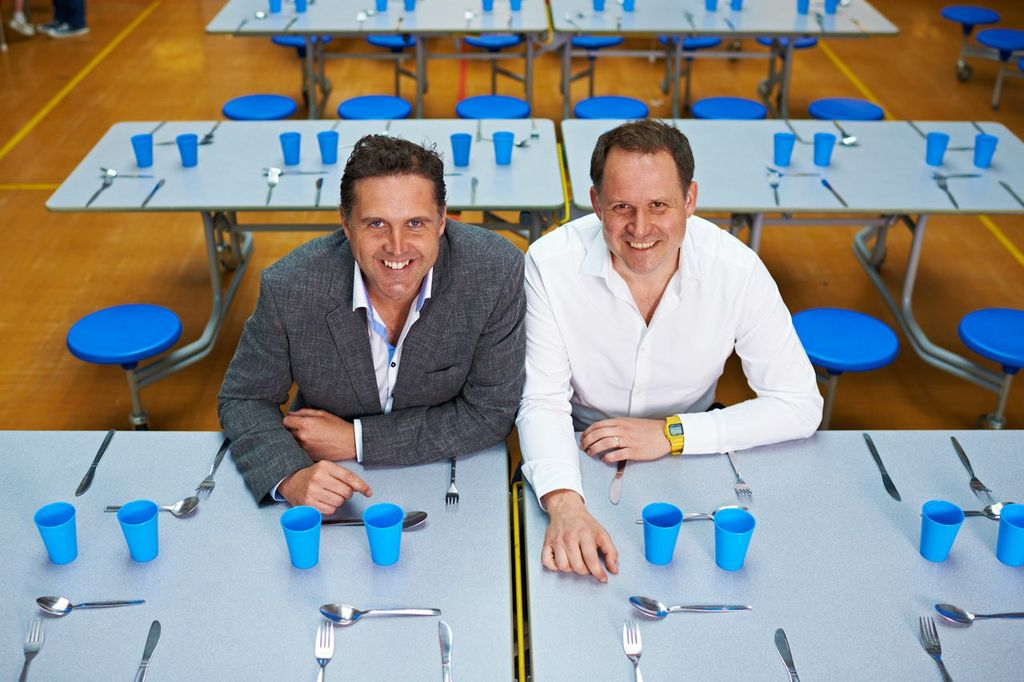
- Dimbleby (right) with his Leon Restaurants co-founder, John Vincent
- Born: Henry Richard Melville Dimbleby; May 1970 (age 56)
- Education: Eton College; University of Oxford
- Occupations: Cookery writer and businessman
- Known for: Co-founder of Leon Restaurants; Co-founder of the Sustainable Restaurant Association
- Board member of: Leon Restaurants
- Spouse: Jemima Lewis
- Children: 3
- Parent(s): David Dimbleby; Josceline Dimbleby
- Relatives: Dimbleby family
- Website: HenryDimbleby.com

Henry Richard Melville Dimbleby MBE (born May 1970) is a British businessman and cookery writer who is a co-founder of Leon Restaurants and the Sustainable Restaurant Association. He was appointed lead non-executive board member of the Department for Environment, Food and Rural Affairs in March 2018. He is a son of BBC broadcaster David Dimbleby and of Josceline Dimbleby.

== Early life ==
Dimbleby was born to broadcaster David Dimbleby and cookery writer Josceline Dimbleby in May 1970. His sister Kate Dimbleby is a cabaret singer. He was educated at the Dragon School and Eton College, where he was a Newcastle scholar and a contemporary of Conservative MP Jacob Rees-Mogg. Later, he attended the University of Oxford where he read Physics and Philosophy. In 1984 he played Tom Dudgeon in the TV series Swallows and Amazons Forever!

== Career ==
=== Cookery writing ===
Dimbleby's first job was as a commis chef with Michelin-starred chef Bruno Loubet, before joining The Daily Telegraph as a food columnist.

Later, he was a regular cookery columnist for The Guardian, and has appeared on BBC Radio 4's The Kitchen Cabinet and BBC One's Saturday Kitchen.

=== Management consultancy ===
Dimbleby worked for management consultants Bain & Co for seven years from 1995 to 2002.

=== Restaurant entrepreneurship ===
During his time at Bain, Dimbleby met John Vincent, and together they formulated the idea of Leon Restaurants. Leon Restaurants was subsequently co-founded by Vincent and Dimbleby with chef Allegra McEvedy.

Dimbleby co-founded the Sustainable Restaurants Association in 2009, and The London Union, which controls some of London’s biggest street food markets.

=== Campaigning ===
==== School meals ====
In 2013 Dimbleby and John Vincent were invited by the then Secretary of State for Education Michael Gove to write a report on school meals in the United Kingdom. They produced the School Food Plan, which made 17 recommendations to improve the quality of school meals and food education. As a result of the plan, the government now provides free school lunches to all infants in years Reception, 1 and 2. In addition, practical cooking and nutrition is now part of the National Curriculum for 4- to 14-year-olds, and two major food flagships have been launched across Lambeth and Croydon. On 25 November 2015, the government stated that free infant school meals would be safe from national spending cuts.

==== National Food Strategy ====
In July 2020 the National Food Strategy, Part One, was published, which Dimbleby led. This proposed actions to help disadvantaged children and to promote environmental and animal welfare standards. The recommendations for disadvantaged children were supported by Marcus Rashford in his 2020 Covid-related campaign.

=== Other ===
From 2018 to 2023, Dimbleby was the a non-executive board member of the Department for Environment, Food and Rural Affairs.

In January 2024 Dimbleby founded Bramble Partners, a venture capital firm, that invests in businesses seeking to improve food security.

== Recognition ==
Vincent and Dimbleby were appointed MBEs in the 2015 Birthday Honours for their work on the School Food Plan.

In 2017, Dimbleby received the Sustainable Restaurant Association's Raymond Blanc Sustainability Hero award along with Vincent.

In July 2025, Dimbleby was given an honorary doctorate by Newcastle University.

== Personal life ==
Dimbleby is married to Jemima Lewis, a journalist. They have three children and live in Hackney, east London.

== Bibliography ==
- The School Food Plan (2013)
- Dimbleby, Henry; Lewis, Jemima (23 March 2023). Ravenous: How to Get Ourselves and Our Planet Into Shape. United Kingdom: Profile Books. ISBN 9781800816510.
