= Silla Bjerrum =

Danish restaurateur and chef

- Born: Denmark
- Occupation: Chef
- Years active: 1999–present

Silla Bjerrum is a restaurateur and Chef best known for her expertise in sushi.

== Early life and career ==
Born in Denmark, Bjerrum's interest in seafood began during childhood holidays by the sea.

After studying philosophy, Bjerrum's introduction to Japanese food came in 1994 while studying for a master's degree in sociology at London Goldsmiths college, when she took a job at the Canary Wharf branch of Japanese restaurant Nippon Tuk. It was here that she first tasted sushi and began to pick up the skills required for its preparation, noting its similarities to Danish cuisine, where raw fish is a common ingredient. Her boss at Nippon Tuk was Jeremy Rose, the restaurant entrepreneur who would become her co-founder at Feng Sushi.

Bjerrum left Nippon Tuk to work for Birley's, the sandwich chain owned by the socialite Robin Birley. While working for Birley, Bjerrum was approached by Jeremy Rose with a plan to start a New York-style delivery service in London, with Rose asking Bjerrum to set up the kitchen operation as executive chef. The service was launched as Feng Sushi in 1999, in Fulham, London, and was the capital's first sushi delivery service.

Bjerrum became Feng Sushi's managing director after Jeremy Rose stood down in 2008. She was a part-owner of the chain, with entrepreneur Luke Johnson the majority owner following his purchase of a 92.5% stake in 2010. Silla is no longer working for Feng Sushi.

== Sustainable food sourcing ==
Bjerrum is a regular media commentator on sustainable seafood issues. Her interest in sustainability began after a trip to a Scottish salmon farm, where she saw fish being kept in poor conditions. This incident prompted her to offer sustainably-farmed salmon on Feng Sushi's menu.

Bjerrum has spoken of the difficulties and challenges of running a sustainably-sourced fish restaurant: "The problem is that it's a minefield and the more you get into it the more complicated it gets. Sustainability doesn't happen overnight but it will happen."

== Teaching and adjudicating ==
In 2008 Bjerrum was the first woman to be invited to compete in the prestigious Seven Samurai Sushi Competition, an annual contest of acknowledged sushi masters from around the world. She was on the judging panel for the competition between 2003 and 2005.

== Publication ==
Bjerrum is the author of Simple Japanese, published in 2007 by Quadrille Publishing.

== Personal life ==
Bjerrum lives in London's Acton district, with her partner and two children. She lists visiting fish suppliers as her hobby.
