= Feng Sushi =

British restaurant chain

- Type: Private
- Industry: Restaurants
- Founded: 1999; 27 years ago
- Headquarters: London, England
- Key people: Silla Bjerrum (MD)
- Products: Sushi; Nigiri; Temaki; Home delivery; Salad; Dessert
- Revenue: £5m in 2009
- Number of employees: 150+
- Website: FengSushi.co.uk

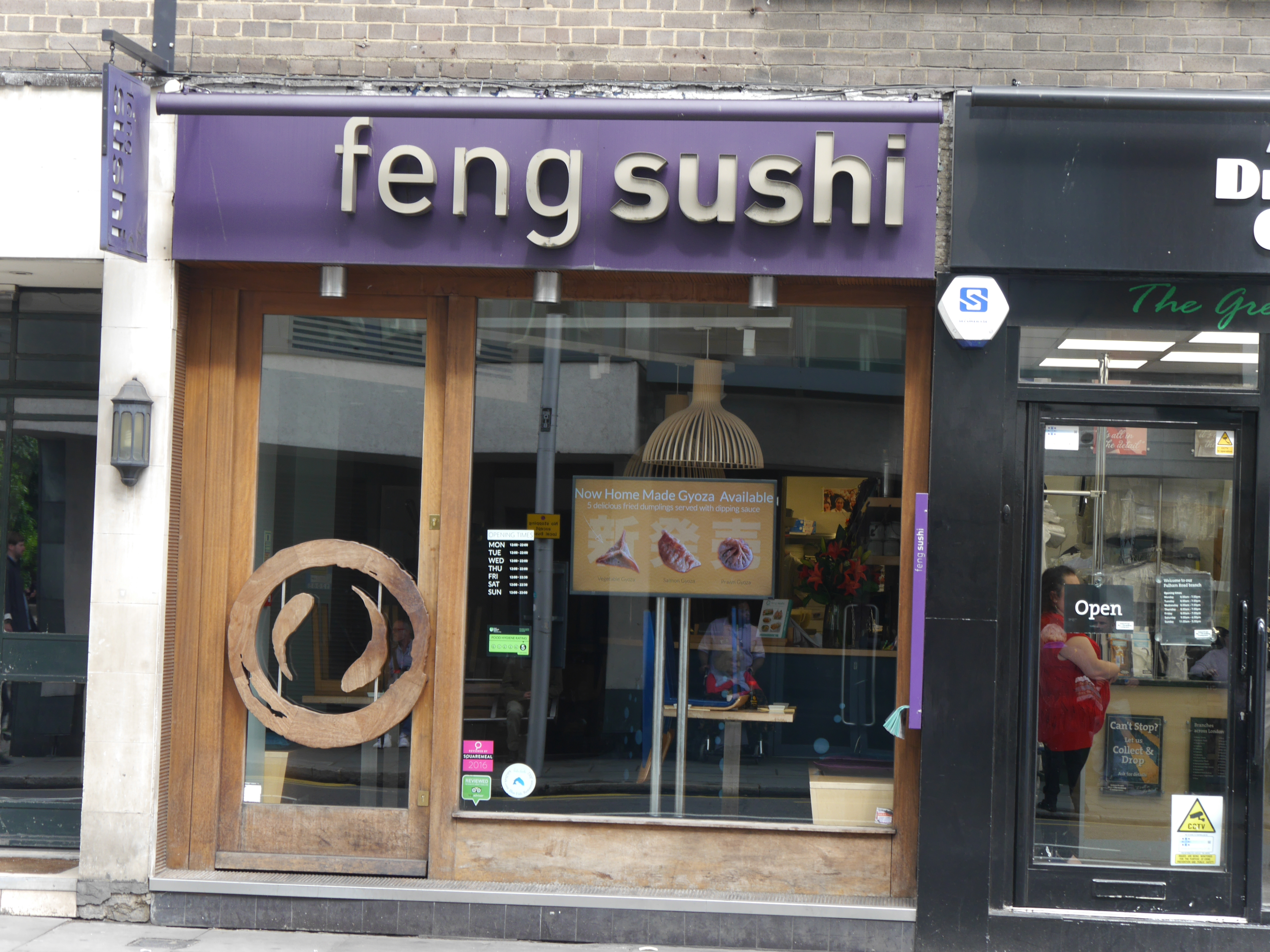
Feng Sushi, Fulham Road, Chelsea, London

Feng Sushi is a UK-based restaurant chain known for advocating sustainable fish farming. The company was founded in 1999 by chef Silla Bjerrum and chef Jeremy Rose, with restaurant entrepreneur Luke Johnson the majority owner since 2010.

Bjerrum has been credited by Caterer and Hotelkeeper Magazine as being "...part of the movement that brought sushi to the mainstream".

== History ==
The chain's first outlet opened in Fulham, London in 1999. Bjerrum had previously been employed at London's Nippon Tuk restaurant, owned by Rose. Following Nippon Tuk, Bjerrum worked for club entrepreneur Robin Birley before being asked by Rose to become a partner in the creation of Feng Sushi, with Rose taking New-York style delivery services as inspiration. In 2008 Rose stepped down from the company and Bjerrum became MD.

== Sustainability ==
The company has policies relating to overfishing, animal welfare and organic aquaculture.

Feng Sushi's stated position is to sell sushi made only from sustainably-sourced fish. The chain does not sell eel or blue fin tuna, further to the view that both species have been severely overfished. According to the International Seafood Sustainability Foundation (a global, non-profit partnership between the tuna industry, scientists, and the World Wide Fund for Nature), Indian Ocean yellowfin tuna, Pacific Ocean (eastern & western) bigeye tuna, and North Atlantic albacore tuna are all overfished. In April 2009, no stock of skipjack tuna (which makes up roughly 60 per cent of all tuna fished worldwide) was considered to be overfished. Its yellowfin tuna dishes are pole and line caught and are reportedly the restaurant's only ingredient to be shipped in by air; scallop dishes are sourced by hand-diving and the firm's cooking oil is collected and made into biodiesel. The chain is a founding member of the Sustainable Restaurant Association.

Bjerrum began sustainable sourcing after a visit to a Scottish salmon farm in 2001, where she was disturbed by the standard of animal welfare:

"When I was on the walkway the salmon were rattling the cages and seemed so generally unhappy. It forced me to reconsider where I got my salmon from."

Bjerrum is a frequent media commentator on the topic of sustainable fishing in the restaurant industry. She has characterised sustainability as "...an insurance for the fish restaurant business...Future supply issues are real."

== Operations ==
As of May 2013, Feng Sushi operates from eight sites: Fulham, Borough Market, Kensington, Notting Hill Gate, Chalk Farm, South Bank, Billingsgate and West Hampstead. In 2009 it reported a turnover of £5m from six sites, employing 150 staff. Approximately half of the group's turnover is derived from online sales.

== Awards ==
2012 – Sustainable City award, chosen by Raymond Blanc and awarded for sustainability in takeaway food.

2013 – Sustainable Restaurant Association's Award for Innovation.

== See also ==
- List of sushi restaurants
