= Katie Derham =

British television presenter

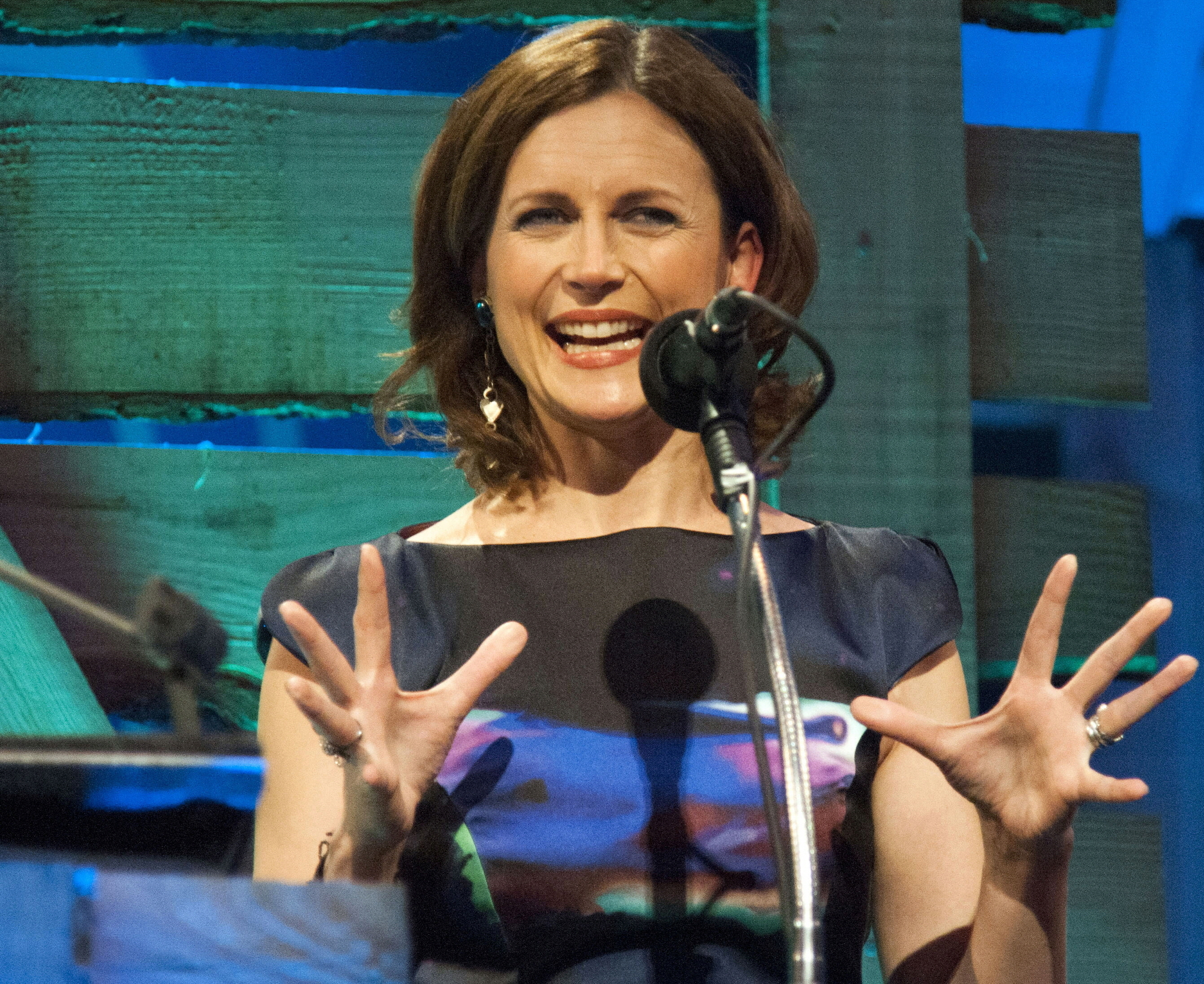
- Katie Derham at the 2014 BBC Radio 2 Folk Awards
- Born: Catherine Beatrice Margaret Derham; 18 June 1970 (age 56); Canterbury, Kent, England
- Education: Cheadle Hulme School; University of Cambridge (BA)
- Occupations: Journalist television prmaesenter
- Notable credit(s): BBC Radio 3 ITN; ITV News
- Spouse: John Vincent (m. 1999)
- Children: 2

Catherine Beatrice Margaret Derham (born 18 June 1970) is a British newscaster and a presenter on television and radio.

== Early life and education ==
Derham was born in Canterbury, Kent, on 18 June 1970 to Margaret, a teacher, and John Derham, a chemist. The family moved to Cheshire within a year of her birth, and she grew up in Wilmslow. She went to a primary school in Sandbach before being privately educated at Cheadle Hulme School where she studied A-levels in French, History and Economics. She subsequently studied economics at the University of Cambridge where she was a student at Magdalene College, Cambridge, graduating with a Bachelor of Arts (BA) degree.

== Career ==
Derham began her broadcasting career at the BBC, starting as a researcher on BBC Radio 4's Money Box. In 1995, she won the Bradford & Bingley "Best Personal Finance Broadcaster Award" for her work as a presenter on BBC Radio 5 Live's Moneycheck. She moved to BBC television in 1996 as a consumer affairs correspondent and was also a reporter on the long-running Film... programme.

=== ITN 1998–2010 ===
In 1998, Derham joined ITN as the Media and Arts Editor for ITV News. At the age of 27, she was the youngest newscaster on British national television since ITN's creation in 1955. In 2004, she became the main female presenter of the ITV Lunchtime News, and a relief presenter for both the ITV Evening News and the ITV News at Ten. She also co-presented the ITV London news programme London Tonight. Derham hosted her final ITV News programme on 25 June 2010.

=== BBC, 2010 onwards ===
In April 2010, it was announced that Derham was to return to the BBC. Derham has an arts brief, including fronting the coverage of the Proms for BBC Two, BBC Four and BBC Radio 3.

Derham is a presenter of Radio 3's Afternoon on 3 and Breakfast programmes, having previously presented the Hall of Fame Concert on Classic FM. In 2008, she presented the Traveller's Tree series on Radio 4. Derham also makes an occasional guest presenter appearance on Saturday Live.

In August 2015, the BBC announced that Derham would appear in the thirteenth series of Strictly Come Dancing. Her partner was Anton Du Beke. In week 4, the couple finished top of the leader board. In weeks 9 and 11, they performed their best dances, both earning 35 out of a possible 40. In the semi-final, they finished last in both dances and were in the dance-off with Anita Rani and Gleb Savchenko; the judges voted them through to compete in the final (the first time Anton had done so) where they finished in fourth place. In 2017, she returned for the Christmas Special and was partnered with Brendan Cole: the couple won the event.

In August 2016, Derham presented a documentary for BBC on The Girl from Ipanema. In September 2017, she presented coverage of the Last Night of the Proms on BBC Two and BBC One, and again in 2025.

Since 2017, Derham has been a presenter on In Tune on BBC Radio 3.

=== Other work ===
Derham hosted the Classic Brit Awards ceremony four times from 2001 to 2004. In August 2008, she appeared in the BBC Two talent programme Maestro, where she learnt to conduct orchestral, choral and operatic music; and, in 2010, in the factual entertainment programme First Love, where she returned to the violin playing of her youth.

In 2015, Derham partnered with BAFTA-nominated producer Jane Gerber to found Peanut & Crumb, a Brighton-based multiplatform studio that produces branded content, podcasts and broadcast programmes.

== Personal life ==
Derham plays the violin. She married restaurateur John Vincent in 1999; he had proposed on the night they met. They have two daughters and live in Horsted Keynes, near Haywards Heath, Sussex.

Preceded by None	Host of ITV News at 1:30; 2004–2010	Succeeded by Alastair Stewart
Preceded by Katie Derham	Female host of London Tonight (ITV); 2004–2010	Succeeded by Nina Hossain
