= Colin McEvedy =

British scholar, psychiatrist, historian, and demographer

Colin Peter McEvedy
- Born: 6 June 1930; Salford, Lancashire, England
- Died: 1 August 2005 (aged 75); London, England
- Occupations: Historian, demographer
- Spouses: Jenny McKinnon Wood; Sarah Leakey
- Children: 3, including Allegra McEvedy

Colin Peter McEvedy (6 June 1930 – 1 August 2005) was a British polymath scholar, psychiatrist, historian, demographer and non-fiction author.

== Early life ==
Colin Peter McEvedy was born in Salford, Lancashire on 6 June 1930. He was the third son of Peter George McEvedy, a renowned surgeon, who was born in New Zealand. Colin was educated at Harrow School, where he was a scholar, and Magdalen College, Oxford.

== Career ==
McEvedy's profession was psychiatry, in which he had a distinguished career. He became perhaps better known, though, as a historian and demographer, and certainly so by the public at large. Between 1961 and 2002 he produced a number of historical atlases which, unlike most such atlases, feature fixed base-maps; in most cases, each atlas uses a single principal base-map, which is shown repeatedly, at many dates, as the atlas goes along, thus illustrating changes over the ages, from ancient down to modern, within the chosen area. The accompanying text, typically, is mostly a running commentary on what the maps of a given atlas show. Another feature of the atlases is McEvedy's witty and engaging writing-style, which he used on occasion to challenge established opinions among historians and demographers. Although he was not, strictly speaking, a professional in those fields, he became professionally respected in them, with his views making their way into standard textbooks.

He died in London, following a diagnosis of terminal myelofibrosis.

== Family life ==
McEvedy had three daughters, Binky, Flora, and Allegra and a son, Phillip. Flora McEvedy is the author of The Step-Parents' Parachute, published by Piatkus Books in 2009. His youngest daughter, Allegra McEvedy, is a noted chef, co-founded the Leon Restaurants chain, and was appointed Member of the Order of the British Empire (MBE) in the 2008 Birthday Honours.

== Publications ==
Penguin Historical Atlases

- The Penguin Atlas of Medieval History (1961) ISBN 0-14-070822-7
  - Revised as: The New Penguin Atlas of Medieval History (1992) ISBN 0-14-051249-7
- The Penguin Atlas of Ancient History (1967) ISBN 0-14-051151-2
  - Revised as: The New Penguin Atlas of Ancient History (2002) ISBN 0-14-051348-5
- The Penguin Atlas of Modern History (1972) ISBN 0-14-051153-9
- The Penguin Atlas of Recent History (1982) ISBN 0-14-051154-7
  - Revised as: The New Penguin Atlas of Recent History (2002) ISBN 0-14-051504-6
- The Penguin Atlas of North American History (1988) ISBN 0-14-051128-8
- The Penguin Atlas of African History (1980, 2nd ed. 1995) ISBN 0-14-051321-3
- The Penguin Historical Atlas of the Pacific (1998) ISBN 0-14-025428-5

The Atlas of World History (with Sarah McEvedy)

- From the Beginning to Alexander the Great (1970) ISBN 0-298-79125-0
- The Classical World (1973) ISBN 0-298-79126-9
- The Dark Ages (1972) ISBN 0-298-79127-7

Unpublished Volumes:

- The Medieval World
- The European Expansion
- Revolutions
- Colonial Empires
- The Modern Age

Other Books

- The Atlas of World Population History (with Richard Jones) (1978) ISBN 0-14-051076-1
- Rise of the World's Cities (1984) ISBN 0-87196-773-1
- World History Factfinder (1984) ISBN 0-02-583190-9
- Cities of the Classical World: An Atlas and Gazetteer of 120 Centres of Ancient Civilization, (posthumous; edited by Douglas Stuart Oles) (3 November 2011), ISBN 978-1-84614-427-1 (hardcover), Allen Lane (imprint of Penguin Books, UK), Penguin Press/Classics (US).

Articles

- "The Bubonic Plague" Scientific American February 1988
