= Anton Du Beke =

English dancer and TV presenter (born 1966)

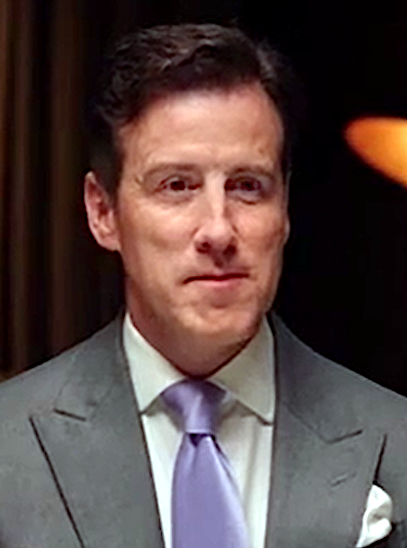
- Du Beke in 2019
- Born: Anthony Paul Beke; 20 July 1966 (age 60); Tonbridge, Kent, England
- Occupations: Professional ballroom and Latin dancer, television presenter, singer, author
- Television: Strictly Come Dancing (2004–present); Hole in the Wall (2008–09); Step Up to the Plate (2008); Victoria Wood's Midlife Christmas (2009)
- Height: 1.80 m (5 ft 11 in)
- Spouse: Hannah Summers (m. 2017)
- Children: 2

Anton Du Beke (/duː ˈbɛk/), (born Anthony Paul Beke 20 July 1966) is a British ballroom and Latin dancer, author, singer and television presenter, best known for being a professional dancer and a judge on the BBC One celebrity dancing show Strictly Come Dancing. His professional dance partner since 1997 has been Erin Boag.

In 2009, he presented the United Kingdom version of Hole in the Wall for the BBC, replacing Dale Winton, after being a team captain in 2008. In November 2017 he released his debut studio album, From the Top, on Polydor Records. It reached number 21 on the UK Albums Chart.

== Family and early life ==
Du Beke was born as Anthony Paul Beke on 20 July 1966 in Tonbridge, Kent, to a Hungarian father, Antal Xavier Beke (1939–2001), and a Spanish mother, Ascensión "Conchita" Lema. He has a younger sister and brother. He grew up in Sevenoaks, Kent, and attended Wildernesse School. Du Beke has discussed his father's problems with alcoholism and revealed that he was stabbed by his father in the leg and stomach during a Boxing Day altercation at their home in Kent.

Du Beke began dancing at 14, when he discovered his local dance school, the Holton School of Dancing in Sevenoaks. He had three partners during these formative years before the Holton School of Dancing closed in 1987. Du Beke left school at 16 to follow an amateur dancing career. At 17, he decided to specialise in ballroom. While he danced during the evenings and at weekends, he had a day jobs as a salesman in "The Bed Post" in Petts Wood, South London, and Hamiltons in Chislehurst.

He changed his name by deed poll in 1982 and dated television presenter Caroline Feraday from 2007 to 2008.

Du Beke married Hannah Summers on 20 April 2017 at Cliveden in Taplow, Buckinghamshire. The couple have twins, a boy and girl. They live in Burnham, Buckinghamshire.

== Career ==
=== Dance career ===
Du Beke's regular professional partner is New Zealand-born Erin Boag. They met in 1997, and won both the Closed (New Zealand only) and Open to the World categories of the 1998 and 1999 New Zealand Championships. They turned professional in 2002 and became British National Finalists in the same year, a title they retained in 2003 and 2004. In November 2003, they also won the IDTA Classic in Brighton. They balanced competing with teaching, coaching, among others, the Cambridge University ballroom dancing team, one of the top-ranked student teams in the country. When they were scouted for Strictly Come Dancing in 2004, Anton and Erin were ranked 14th in the world among professional ballrooms dancers. They joined the show assuming that it would only last for one series, and were completely unprepared for Strictly's immediate massive popularity with the viewing public. Although they continued to compete for the first two series of the show, they retired from the competitive arena after realizing that they had to choose between dancing professionally and committing fully to training their celebrity partners.

=== Strictly Come Dancing ===
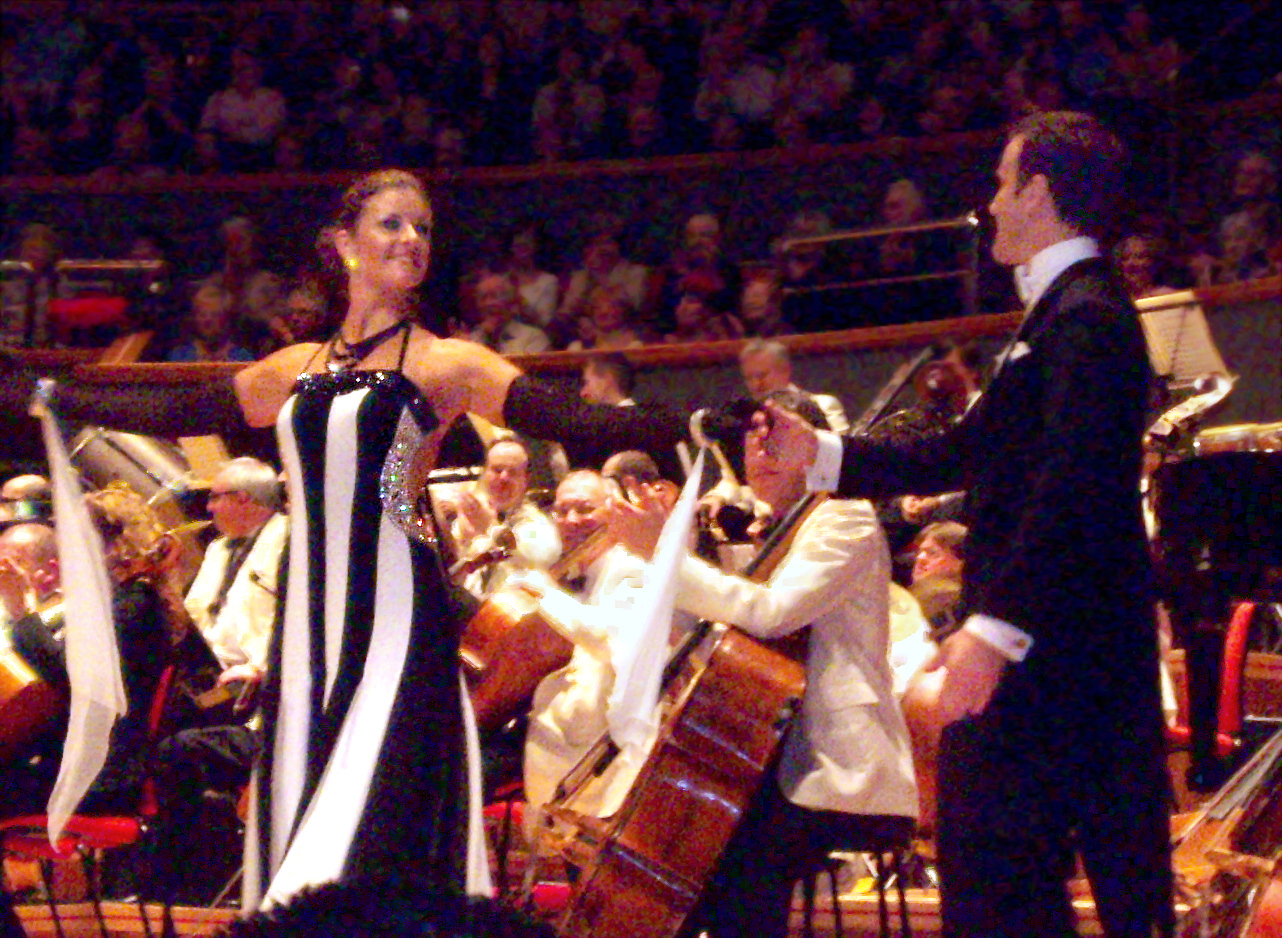
Anton du Beke and dance partner Erin Boag in 2008

Highest and lowest scoring performances per dance

| Dance | Partner | Highest | Partner | Lowest |
|---|---|---|---|---|
| American Smooth | Emma Barton | 37 | Ann Widdecombe | 14 |
| Cha Cha Cha | Emma Barton | 31 | Judy Murray | 17 |
| Charleston | Emma Barton | 39 | Ann Widdecombe | 17 |
| Couple's Choice | Emma Barton | 33 | _ | _ |
| Foxtrot | Katie Derham | 35 | Susannah Constantine | 12 |
| Argentine tango | Katie Derham | 32 | _ | _ |
| Jive | Lesley Garrett | 29 | Jan Ravens | 18 |
| Paso Doble | Laila Rouass; Lesley Garrett | 30 | Ann Widdecombe | 16 |
| Quickstep | Lesley Garrett | 33 | Kate Garraway | 15 |
| Rumba | Katie Derham | 31 | Ann Widdecombe; Nancy Dell'Olio | 14 |
| Salsa | Emma Barton | 27 | Ann Widdecombe | 12 |
| Samba | Laila Rouass | 28 | Susannah Constantine | 12 |
| Tango | Patsy Palmer | 34 | Esther Rantzen | 16 |
| Viennese Waltz | Emma Barton | 39 | Judy Murray | 24 |
| Waltz | Emma Barton | 36 | Nancy Dell'Olio | 12 |
| Showdance | Emma Barton | 38 | Katie Derham | 31 |

Du Beke has appeared in every series of the BBC's Strictly Come Dancing since its inception. In the first series, he danced with singer Lesley Garrett and finished in third place. For the second series, he partnered presenter Esther Rantzen; they were eliminated in the third week. He danced with actress Patsy Palmer for the third series and finished in fifth place. In the fourth series, he danced with actress and impressionist Jan Ravens but was eliminated in week five of the competition. His partner for the fifth series was TV presenter Kate Garraway; the couple were voted out in week seven. His partner for the sixth series was actress Gillian Taylforth; the couple were voted out in week two. In series seven, he was partnered with Laila Rouass. Together, they made it to week twelve.

In series eight, he partnered Conservative politician Ann Widdecombe. Despite Widdecombe's poor dancing ability, they made it through to the quarter final. For its ninth series, Nancy Dell'Olio was Anton's partner; the couple were eliminated in week five. His partner for the tenth series was model and actress Jerry Hall. They were eliminated in week three. His partner for series eleven was actress Fiona Fullerton. They were eliminated in week eight in Blackpool. For the show's twelfth series, his partner was tennis coach Judy Murray. They were also eliminated in week eight in Blackpool. For series thirteen, Du Beke was partnered with newscaster and presenter Katie Derham; they made it to Du Beke's first final in all thirteen series and were eliminated in fourth place.

In series fourteen, Du Beke was partnered with actress Lesley Joseph. They were eliminated in week five. In series fifteen in 2017, Du Beke was paired with television presenter Ruth Langsford. In 2018 Anton was partnered with Fashion Journalist Susannah Constantine. They finished last (the first time Du Beke had ever done this) with an average of 12.00 (Du Beke's lowest). For the 17th series, he was partnered with Emma Barton. In Week nine, Du Beke received his first 10s in all seventeen series for their American Smooth; the couple received a total of fifteen 10s during the series. They finished joint runners-up alongside Karim Zeroual and Amy Dowden, but lost out to Kelvin Fletcher and Oti Mabuse. In 2020 Du Beke was partnered with former home secretary Jacqui Smith. They were eliminated in week two (first), Du Beke's second time finishing last.

Du Beke has also appeared in a number of Children in Need and Christmas Specials of Strictly Come Dancing. In 2008 he won the Children in Need 2008 special, dancing an American Smooth with Tess Daly. He danced once again with Anne Widdecombe in the 2012 Children in Need special but lost out to Russell Grant and Flavia Cacace. He did however go on to win the Children in Need 2014 special where he and fellow dancer Natalie Lowe taught a group of children how to dance. Du Beke has also reprised his partnerships with Lesley Garret and Ann Widdecombe for the 2004 and 2018 Christmas specials, respectively. He has also danced with Ronni Ancona, Su Pollard, Katy Brand and Denise Lewis in the respective 2010, 2011, 2012 and 2016 Christmas specials. In 2015 Du Beke served as a judge on The People's Strictly, a one off version of the show where non-celebrities compete for the charity Comic Relief. In 2020, he reprised his role as a judge for weeks four and five to fill in for Motsi Mabuse, who needed to quarantine after travelling to Germany. On 24 June 2021, it was announced that Du Beke would become a permanent judge on Strictly Come Dancing from series nineteen, starting in September 2021, replacing Bruno Tonioli.

=== Laila Rouass comment ===
In 2009, Du Beke said that his dance partner Laila Rouass "looked like a paki" after she had arrived at rehearsal with a spray tan. Du Beke apologized publicly, and reiterated his remarks on It Takes Two, Strictly Come Dancing's companion show, stating that "I feel embarrassed. I feel stupid as well. It was a stupid thing to do, stupid thing to say ... I am mortified about it completely and, you know, Laila has been quite remarkably wonderful." Rouass accepted his apology, and stated in a 2011 interview: "The story had been blown out of proportion ... Anton didn’t mean to be offensive. I wouldn’t have danced with him if he was racist." In 2016, she backed him to be a Strictly judge: "I think Anton would be a fabulous judge. He's so funny, I can’t tell you. I was so lucky to be paired with that man."

=== Other television appearances ===
In March 2007 Du Beke was a contestant on the BBC Two series The Underdog Show and was paired with homeless dog Ginger. They were eliminated in week three of the competition.

Du Beke has presented the BBC cookery show Step Up to the Plate. He served as a captain and from series 2 was the host on the UK version of Hole in the Wall, which premiered on 20 September 2008 on BBC One. On 24 December 2009, he appeared in Victoria Wood's Midlife Christmas, in a sketch called "Beyond The Marigolds", where he spoofed his Strictly Come Dancing role by being paired with fictional soap star "Bo Beaumont" (played by Julie Walters). Beaumont quit the show when unable to master Du Beke's warm-up steps.

In 2011, Du Beke was the first guest on the CBBC talk show Hacker Time.

During the week of 5 to 9 May 2014, Du Beke appeared on Channel 4 game show Draw It!.

On Christmas Day 2019, Du Beke surprised Craig Revel Horwood as a guest in the Christmas Midnight Gameshow in Michael McIntyre's Big Christmas Show.

On 27 October 2023, Du Beke guest presented Steph's Packed Lunch on Channel 4.

In early 2023, Du Beke and Giovanni Pernice appeared in the travel mini series Anton & Giovanni's Adventures in Sicily. In 2024, this was followed by Anton & Giovanni's Adventures in Spain.

In 2026, Du Beke appeared as a contestant on the seventh series of The Masked Singer as "Arctic Fox". He was sixth to be unmasked.

=== Strictly Come Dancing performances ===
| Series | Partner | Place | Average Score |
|---|---|---|---|
| 1 | Lesley Garrett | 3rd | 29.3 |
| 2 | Esther Rantzen | 8th | 18.7 |
| 3 | Patsy Palmer | 5th | 27.7 |
| 4 | Jan Ravens | 9th | 22.8 |
| 5 | Kate Garraway | 8th | 19.2 |
| 6 | Gillian Taylforth | 15th | 22.0 |
| 7 | Laila Rouass | 4th | 27.8 |
| 8 | Ann Widdecombe | 6th | 16.2 |
| 9 | Nancy Dell'Olio | 11th | 15.6 |
| 10 | Jerry Hall | 13th | 18.0 |
| 11 | Fiona Fullerton | 9th | 26.1 |
| 12 | Judy Murray | 9th | 19.4 |
| 13 | Katie Derham | 4th | 28.4 |
| 14 | Lesley Joseph | 11th | 26.2 |
| 15 | Ruth Langsford | 9th | 20.0 |
| 16 | Susannah Constantine | 15th | 12.0 |
| 17 | Emma Barton | 2nd | 31.6 |
| 18 | Jacqui Smith | 12th | 16.7 |

Series 1 – with celebrity partner Lesley Garrett, Du Beke was placed 3rd.

| Week # | Dance/Song | Judges' score | | | | Total | Result |
| Week # | Dance/Song | Horwood | Phillips | Goodman | Tonioli | Total | Result |
| 1 | Waltz / "He Was Beautiful" | 6 | 8 | 8 | 7 | 29 | No elimination |
| 2 | Rumba / "You'll Never Find Another Love Like Mine" | 6 | 7 | 7 | 7 | 27 | Safe |
| 3 | Tango / "Sensation" | 7 | 8 | 7 | 7 | 29 | Safe |
| 4 | Paso Doble / "Scott & Fran's Paso Doble" | 7 | 7 | 8 | 8 | 30 | Bottom two |
| 5 | Samba / "Mas que Nada" | 7 | 6 | 7 | 7 | 27 | Bottom two |
| 6 | Foxtrot / "I've Got You Under My Skin"; Cha-Cha-Cha / "Spinning Around" | 8; 6 | 8; 6 | 9; 7 | 9; 7 | 34; 26 | Bottom two |
| 7 | Quickstep / "That Old Black Magic"; Jive / "My Baby Just Cares for Me" | 8; 7 | 8; 7 | 8; 8 | 9; 7 | 33; 29 | Third place |

Series 2 – with celebrity partner Esther Rantzen, Du Beke was placed 8th.

| Week # | Dance/Song | Judges' score | | | | Total | Result |
| Week # | Dance/Song | Horwood | Phillips | Goodman | Tonioli | Total | Result |
| 1 | Waltz / "Moon River" | 5 | 6 | 6 | 7 | 24 | Safe |
| 2 | Rumba / "The Look of Love" | 2 | 4 | 5 | 5 | 16 | Bottom two |
| 3 | Tango / "Tanguera" | 2 | 4 | 5 | 5 | 16 | Eliminated |

Series 3 – with celebrity partner Patsy Palmer; placed 5th

| Week # | Dance/Song | Judges' score | | | | Total | Result |
| Week # | Dance/Song | Horwood | Phillips | Goodman | Tonioli | Total | Result |
| 1 | Waltz / "Fly Me to the Moon" | 3 | 4 | 6 | 6 | 19 | Safe |
| 2 | Rumba / "She" | 6 | 6 | 7 | 7 | 26 | Safe |
| 3 | Tango / "Una Musica Brutal" | 8 | 8 | 9 | 9 | 34 | Safe |
| 4 | Foxtrot / "You're Nobody till Somebody Loves You" | 7 | 8 | 8 | 8 | 31 | Safe |
| 5 | Samba / "Go Back to My Roots" | 6 | 6 | 7 | 7 | 26 | Safe |
| 6 | Quickstep / "Lover Come Back to Me" | 7 | 8 | 8 | 8 | 31 | Bottom two |
| 7 | Cha-Cha-Cha / "A Little Less Conversation" | 6 | 4 | 7 | 7 | 24 | Bottom two |
| 8 | Jive / "Two Hearts"; American Smooth / "It Had to Be You" | 6; 7 | 6; 8 | 7; 8 | 8; 8 | 27; 31 | Eliminated |

Series 4 – with celebrity partner Jan Ravens; placed 9th

| Week # | Dance/Song | Judges' score | | | | Total | Result |
| Week # | Dance/Song | Horwood | Phillips | Goodman | Tonioli | Total | Result |
| 2 | Quickstep / "When You're Smiling" | 6 | 6 | 6 | 6 | 24 | Safe |
| 3 | Jive / "Do You Wanna Dance" | 3 | 4 | 6 | 5 | 18 | Safe |
| 4 | Foxtrot / "Night and Day" | 5 | 5 | 7 | 7 | 24 | Bottom two |
| 5 | Viennese Waltz / "Iris" | 5 | 6 | 7 | 7 | 25 | Eliminated |

Series 5 – with celebrity partner Kate Garraway; placed 8th

| Week # | Dance/Song | Judges' score | | | | Total | Result |
| Week # | Dance/Song | Horwood | Phillips | Goodman | Tonioli | Total | Result |
| 2 | Quickstep / "Love Machine" | 2 | 4 | 5 | 4 | 15 | Safe |
| 3 | Tango / "They" | 4 | 5 | 5 | 5 | 19 | Safe |
| 4 | Samba / "Dancing Queen" | 3 | 3 | 6 | 4 | 16 | Safe |
| 5 | Foxtrot / "I Could Write a Book" | 5 | 7 | 7 | 7 | 26 | Safe |
| 6 | Salsa / "Peanut Vendor" | 3 | 4 | 6 | 5 | 18 | Safe |
| 7 | Paso Doble / "Somebody Told Me" | 4 | 5 | 7 | 5 | 21 | Eliminated |

Series 6 – with celebrity partner Gillian Taylforth; placed 15th

| Week # | Dance/Song | Judges' score | | | | Total | Result |
| Week # | Dance/Song | Horwood | Phillips | Goodman | Tonioli | Total | Result |
| 2 | Foxtrot / "Razzle Dazzle" | 4 | 5 | 7 | 6 | 22 | Eliminated |

Series 7 – with celebrity partner Laila Rouass; placed 4th

| Week # | Dance/Song | Judges' score | | | | Total | Result |
| Week # | Dance/Song | Horwood | Goodman | Dixon | Tonioli | Total | Result |
| 2 | Tango / "El Choclo"; Cha-Cha-Cha / "Sway" | 7; 6 | 8; 7 | 7; 6 | 8; 6 | 30; 25 | Safe |
| 3 | Quickstep / "Strike Up the Band" | 8 | 8 | 7 | 7 | 30 | Safe |
| 4 | Foxtrot / "Just in Time" | 8 | 9 | 9 | 8 | 34 | Safe |
| 5 | Jive / "Modern Love" | 5 | 7 | 5 | 5 | 22 | Safe |
| 6 | Samba / "He's the Greatest Dancer" | 7 | 7 | 7 | 7 | 28 | Safe |
| 7 | Viennese Waltz / "Once Around the Block" | 8 | 9 | 8 | 8 | 33 | Safe |
| 8 | Paso Doble / "Layla" | 7 | 7 | 8 | 8 | 30 | Safe |
| 9^{1} | Rumba / "Rule the World" | 3 | 7 | 6 | 6 | 22 | Safe |
| 10 | Waltz / "Fascination" | 6 | 8 | 7 | 8 | 29 | Bottom two |
| 11 | Charleston / "Yes Sir, That's My Baby" | 6 | 9 | 8 | 8 | 31 | Safe |
| 12 | American Smooth / "My Kind of Girl"; Salsa / "Cogele el Gusto" | 6, 6^{2} 5, 5^{2} | 7; 6 | 7; 5 | 7; 5 | 33; 26 | Eliminated |

^{1} Rouass and Du Beke only performed half of their routine, due to an injury.
^{2} Scores from guest judge Darcey Bussell.

Series 8 – with celebrity partner Ann Widdecombe; placed 6th

| Week # | Dance/Song | Judges' score | | | | Total | Result |
| Week # | Dance/Song | Horwood | Goodman | Dixon | Tonioli | Total | Result |
| 1 | Waltz / "My Cherie" | 2 | 5 | 5 | 5 | 17 | No elimination |
| 2 | Salsa / "Mambo Italiano" | 1 | 4 | 4 | 3 | 12 | Safe |
| 3 | Quickstep / "Puttin' On the Ritz" | 3 | 5 | 5 | 5 | 18 | Safe |
| 4 | Tango / "La cumparsita" | 3 | 7 | 6 | 5 | 21 | Safe |
| 5 | Paso Doble / "Wild Thing" | 2 | 5 | 5 | 4 | 16 | Safe |
| 6 | Charleston / "Let's Do It, Let's Fall in Love" | 2 | 6 | 5 | 4 | 17 | Safe |
| 7 | Foxtrot / "You Make Me Feel So Young" | 3 | 6 | 6 | 5 | 20 | Safe |
| 8 | Samba / "Heaven Must Be Missing an Angel" | 1 | 5 | 4 | 3 | 13 | Safe |
| 9 | Rumba / "My Heart Will Go On" | 1 | 5 | 5 | 3 | 14 | Safe |
| 10 | American Smooth / "Hello Dolly" | 2 | 5 | 4 | 3 | 14 | Eliminated |

Series 9 – with celebrity partner Nancy Dell'Olio; placed 11th

| Week # | Dance/Song | Judges' score | | | | Total | Result |
| Week # | Dance/Song | Horwood | Goodman | Dixon | Tonioli | Total | Result |
| 1 | Waltz / "In Napoli" | 1 | 4 | 3 | 4 | 12 | No elimination |
| 2 | Salsa / "Papa Loves Mambo" | 3 | 5 | 2 | 4 | 14 | Safe |
| 3 | Tango / "Be Italian" | 4 | 5 | 5 | 6 | 20 | Bottom two |
| 4 | Paso Doble / "Rodrigo's Guitar Concerto" | 3 | 5 | 5 | 5 | 18 | Bottom two |
| 5 | Rumba / "Spooky" | 2 | 5 | 3 | 4 | 14 | Eliminated |

Series 10 – with celebrity partner Jerry Hall; placed 13th

| Week # | Dance/Song | Judges' score | | | | Total | Result |
| Week # | Dance/Song | Horwood | Bussell | Goodman | Tonioli | Total | Result |
| 1 | Cha-Cha-Cha / "Everybody Loves to Cha Cha Cha" | 3 | 5 | 5 | 5 | 18 | No elimination |
| 2 | Foxtrot / "Pennies from Heaven" | 3 | 5 | 5 | 5 | 18 | Safe |
| 3 | Quickstep / "Mrs. Robinson" | 3 | 6 | 5 | 4 | 18 | Eliminated |

Series 11 – with celebrity partner Fiona Fullerton; placed 9th

| Week # | Dance/Song | Judges' score | | | | Total | Result |
| Week # | Dance/Song | Horwood | Bussell | Goodman | Tonioli | Total | Result |
| 1 | Tango / "A View to a Kill" | 5 | 6 | 7 | 6 | 24 | No elimination |
| 2 | Cha-Cha-Cha / "Beggin'" | 6 | 6 | 5 | 5 | 22 | Safe |
| 3 | Waltz / "True Love" | 7 | 7 | 7 | 7 | 28 | Safe |
| 4 | Rumba / "World of Our Own" | 4 | 6 | 6 | 6 | 22 | Safe |
| 5 | Quickstep / "If My Friends Could See Me Now" | 7 | 7 | 8 | 8 | 30 | Safe |
| 6 | Charleston / "Jeepers Creepers" | 6 | 7 | 8 | 7 | 28 | Safe |
| 7 | Paso Doble / "Song 2" | 5 | 7 | 7 | 7 | 26 | Safe |
| 8 | American Smooth / "Come Fly with Me" | 6 | 7 | 8 | 8 | 29 | Eliminated |

Series 12 – with celebrity partner Judy Murray; placed 9th

| Week # | Dance/Song | Judges' score | | | | Total | Result |
| Week # | Dance/Song | Horwood | Bussell | Goodman | Tonioli | Total | Result |
| 1 | Waltz / "Mull of Kintyre" | 3 | 4 | 6 | 5 | 18 | No elimination |
| 2 | Cha-Cha-Cha / "She's a Lady" | 2 | 5 | 5 | 5 | 17 | Safe |
| 3 | Quickstep / "Don't Rain on My Parade" | 3 | 5, 5^{3} | 5 | 5 | 23 | Safe |
| 4 | Tango / "Jealousy" | 4 | 6 | 6 | 6 | 22 | Safe |
| 5 | Charleston / "Varsity Drag" | 3 | 5 | 5 | 5 | 18 | Safe |
| 6 | American Smooth / "Cruella de Vil" | 3 | 6 | 6 | 5 | 20 | Safe |
| 7 | Paso Doble / "I Fought the Law" | 3 | 5 | 5 | 5 | 18 | Safe |
| 8 | Viennese Waltz / "Let's Go Fly a Kite" | 4 | 6 | 7 | 7 | 24 | Eliminated |

^{3} Score from guest judge Donny Osmond.

Series 13 – with celebrity partner Katie Derham; placed 4th

| Week # | Dance/Song | Judges' score | | | | Total | Result |
| Week # | Dance/Song | Horwood | Bussell | Goodman | Tonioli | Total | Result |
| 1 | Jive / "Roll Over Beethoven" | 6 | 6 | 7 | 7 | 26 | No elimination |
| 2 | Tango / "Telephone" | 7 | 7 | 7 | 7 | 28 | Safe |
| 3 | Cha-Cha-Cha / "Pretty Woman" | 4 | 6 | 5 | 5 | 20 | Safe |
| 4 | Viennese Waltz / "If I Can Dream" | 8 | 9 | 8 | 8 | 33 | Safe |
| 5 | Salsa / "It had better be tonight" | 4 | 6 | 6 | 5 | 21 | Safe |
| 6 | Paso Doble / "The Phantom of the Opera" | 4 | 6 | 6 | 5 | 21 | Safe |
| 7 | Quickstep / "42nd Street" | 6 | 7 | 7 | 6 | 26 | Safe |
| 8 | Rumba / "Never Never Never" | 7 | 8 | 8 | 8 | 31 | Safe |
| 9 | American Smooth/"Ain't That a Kick in the Head?" | 8 | 9 | 9 | 9 | 35 | Safe |
| 10 | Argentine Tango/"Libertango"; Quickstep-athon / Sing, Sing, Sing | 7 Awarded | 8; 5 | 8 Extra | 9 Points | 32; 37 | Safe |
| 11 | Foxtrot / "Maybe This Time" | 8 | 9 | 9 | 9 | 35 | Safe |
| 12 | Charleston / "Too Darn Hot"; Waltz / "O mio babbino caro" | 4; 8 | 7; 9 | 7; 7 | 7; 7 | 25; 31 | Bottom Two |
| 13 | Quickstep / "42nd Street"; Showdance / "O Fortuna" | 7; 7 | 8; 8 | 8; 8 | 8; 8 | 31; 31 | Fourth place |

Series 14 – with celebrity partner Lesley Joseph; placed 11th

| Week # | Dance/Song | Judges' score | | | | Total | Result |
| Week # | Dance/Song | Horwood | Bussell | Goodman | Tonioli | Total | Result |
| 1 | Waltz / "What'll I Do" | 5 | 6 | 6 | 6 | 23 | No elimination |
| 2 | Cha-cha-cha / "Perhaps Perhaps Perhaps" | 6 | 7 | 7 | 6 | 26 | Safe |
| 3 | Quickstep / "A Couple of Swells" | 6 | 7 | 7 | 7 | 27 | Safe |
| 4 | Charleston / "Won't You Charleston with Me" | 7 | 8 | 8 | 8 | 31 | Safe |
| 5 | Tango/ "Whatever Lola Wants" | 5 | 6 | 7 | 6 | 24 | Eliminated |

Series 15 – with celebrity partner Ruth Langsford; placed 9th

| Week # | Dance/Song | Judges' score | | | | Total | Result |
| Week # | Dance/Song | Horwood | Bussell | Ballas | Tonioli | Total | Result |
| 1 | Waltz / "This Nearly Was Mine" | 3 | 4 | 4 | 5 | 16 | No elimination |
| 2 | Charleston / "The Charleston" | 3 | 5 | 6 | 6 | 20 | Safe |
| 3 | Rumba / "Diamonds Are Forever" | 3 | 5 | 3 | 4 | 15 | Safe |
| 4 | Tango / "Allegretto" | 6 | 6 | 6 | 6 | 24 | Safe |
| 5^{4} | Samba / "Love Is in the Air" | 5 | 5 | 6 | - | 16 | Safe |
| 6 | Quickstep / "Bewitched Theme" | 4 | 6 | 6 | 6 | 22 | Safe |
| 7 | Paso Doble / "The Shady Dame from Seville" | 4 | 6 | 6 | 6 | 22 | Safe |
| 8 | Foxtrot / "Mack The Knife" | 4 | 5 | 4 | 5 | 18 | Eliminated |

^{4}Tonioli was absent due to working on Dancing with the Stars (US TV series)

Series 16 – with celebrity partner Susannah Constantine; placed 15th

| Week # | Dance/Song | Judges' score | | | | Total | Result |
| Week # | Dance/Song | Horwood | Bussell | Ballas | Tonioli | Total | Result |
| 1 | Samba / "Tico-Tico no Fubá" | 1 | 4 | 3 | 4 | 12 | No elimination |
| 2 | Foxtrot / "They Can't Take That Away From Me" | 1 | 4 | 4 | 3 | 12 | Eliminated |

Series 17 – with celebrity partner Emma Barton; placed 2nd

In week 9, at Blackpool, dancing an American Smooth, Du Beke scored his first ever 10s.

| Week # | Dance/Song | Judges' score | | | | Total | Result |
| Week # | Dance/Song | Horwood | Mabuse | Ballas | Tonioli | Total | Result |
| 1 | Jive / "Honey, Honey" | 6 | 6 | 5 | 6 | 23 | No elimination |
| 2 | Foxtrot / "Sunshine of Your Love" | 6 | 6 | 6 | 6 | 24 | Safe |
| 3 | Salsa / "Soul Bossa Nova" | 6 | 7 | 7 | 7 | 27 | Safe |
| 4 | Viennese Waltz / "Send In the Clowns" | 8 | 9 | 9 | 9 | 35 | Safe |
| 5 | Paso Doble / "Nothing Breaks Like a Heart" | 5 | 7 | 7 | 7^{5} | 26 | Safe |
| 6 | Tango / "Toccata and Fugue in D Minor" | 5 | 7 | 8 | 8 | 28 | Safe |
| 7 | Rumba / "Woman in Love" | 5 | 6 | 5 | 6 | 22 | Safe |
| 8 | Jazz / "Right Now" | 8 | 9 | 8 | 8 | 33 | Safe |
| 9 | American Smooth / "Let's Face the Music and Dance" | 8 | 9 | 10 | 10 | 37 | Safe |
| 10 | Quickstep / "Sparkling Diamonds" | 6 | 8 | 7 | 8 | 29 | Safe |
| 11 | Charleston / "Thoroughly Modern Millie" | 9 | 10 | 10 | 10 | 39 | Safe |
| 12 | Cha-Cha-Cha / "Hold My Hand"; Waltz / "Gymnopédie No. 1 | 7; 8 | 8; 9 | 8; 9 | 8; 10 | 31; 36 | Safe |
| 13 | Charleston / "Thoroughly Modern Millie"; Showdance / "Let Yourself Go"; Viennese Waltz / "Send In the Clowns" | 9; 8; 9 | 10; 10; 10 | 10; 10; 10 | 10; 10; 10 | 39; 38; 39 | Runner-up |

^{5}Score awarded by guest judge Alfonso Ribeiro

Series 18 – with celebrity partner Jacqui Smith; placed 12th

| Week # | Dance/Song | Judges' score | | | Total | Result |
| Week # | Dance/Song | Horwood | Ballas | Mabuse | Total | Result |
| 1 | Foxtrot / "Always Look On The Bright Side Of Life" | 3 | 5 | 5 | 13 | No elimination |
| 2 | Samba / "Help Yourself" | 2 | 5 | 5 | 12 | Eliminated |

== Discography ==
- From the Top (2017)

== Books ==
Du Beke has released a book called Anton's Dance Class which was serialised in the Mail on Sunday. Du Beke also wrote an A–Z of ballroom dancing, B is for Ballroom.

=== Buckingham Hotel series ===
In October 2018, Du Beke released his debut novel One Enchanted Evening. Du Beke has now released eight novels in the series which have all been set around the Buckingham Hotel and characters Raymond and Nancy.

- One Enchanted Evening (2018)
- Moonlight over Mayfair (2019)
- A Christmas to Remember (2020)
- We'll Meet Again (November 2021)
- The Ballroom Blitz (2022)
- The Paris Affair (2023)
- A Dance for the King (2024)
- A Winter Ball (2025)

=== Other novels ===
- The Royal Show (2024)
- Monte Carlo by Moonlight (2025)

=== Children's books ===
- Code Name Foxtrot (2024)
- Operation Tango (2025)

=== Memoir ===
- Steps in Time: The Moments that Made Me (2026)

== Dance tours ==
In September 2026, Du Beke announced he was to appear at "Dancing With The Stars Weekends" 2027.

In June 2020, Du Beke and Erin Boag announced a 3-month 2021 UK Tour "SHOWTIME".

In September 2020, Du Beke and Giovanni Pernice announced a 2021 UK Tour "HIM & ME".

== Philanthropy ==
Du Beke is an honorary patron of The Music Hall Guild of Great Britain and America.
