= Leon Restaurants =

British restaurant chain

Leon Restaurants Limited
- Logo used since 2021
- Type: Subsidiary
- Industry: Fast food
- Founded: 2004; 22 years ago
- Founders: John Vincent; Henry Dimbleby; Allegra McEvedy
- Headquarters: London
- Number of locations: 70 (November 2025)
- Area served: United Kingdom; Netherlands; Italy; India (formerly); Ireland (formerly); Norway (formerly); United States (formerly)
- Owner: John Vincent (also CEO)
- Website: leon.co

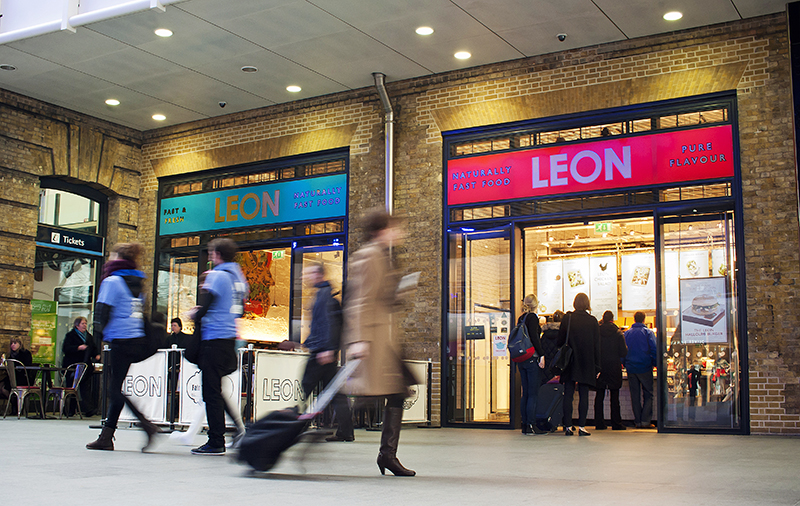
Leon, King's Cross Station, London

Leon Restaurants Limited (branded as LEON) is a fast food chain based in the United Kingdom, established in 2004. In addition to the United Kingdom, the chain also trades in Italy and the Netherlands.

As of November 2025, Leon has 46 restaurants, 20 UK franchises, three franchises in the Netherlands and one franchise in Italy.

== History ==
Leon was founded by John Vincent and Henry Dimbleby with chef Allegra McEvedy. The business was named after Vincent's father, and opened its first outlet in Carnaby Street in 2004. Vincent has said that the founders' original mission was to make seasonal, high-quality fast food available to everyone. Six months after opening, Leon was named the "Best New Restaurant in Great Britain" at The Observer Food Monthly Awards. In 2008, Leon became a founding member of the Sustainable Restaurant Association.

In March 2009, McEvedy gave up her role at Leon to focus on writing and television work, but remains a shareholder. In 2014, John Vincent took over from Henry Dimbleby as CEO, and Dimbleby then left the board in 2017. He also remains a shareholder.

By 2015 Leon had 57 restaurants. In January 2015, HMSHost operated six Leon locations in airports and railway stations in southern England, and Leon announced an expansion of its relationship with HMSHost in 2018, including a franchise agreement in airports and railway stations across Europe and the Middle East. The company hoped to reach an international clientele through these outlets, and help create demand ahead of further overseas openings.

In June 2016 the first Leon outside England opened in Amsterdam. Other overseas openings followed, including restaurants at Utrecht, Oslo, Gran Canaria, Dublin, and Leon's first restaurant in the United States, in Washington, D.C. The latter's style was described as "fast-casual Mediterranean" in the local press.

The chain was named in the 2017 The Sunday Times Fast Track 100 list. Leon was backed by Active Private Equity and, in May 2017, Spice Private Equity became a major investor to support further global expansion plans.

By 2018, the company had 61 sites. In the first quarter of 2019, 53% of the chain's food sales were plant-based or vegetarian.

In March 2020, Leon set up the "Feed NHS" initiative to deliver 5,600 free meals a day to National Health Service critical care staff at London hospitals during the COVID-19 pandemic. Other restaurant chains became involved, including Franco Manca, Tortilla, Tossed, and Wasabi. A JustGiving page was created to raise funds.

Leon USA Inc. filed for liquidation in February 2021, citing low customer numbers because of the Covid-19 pandemic. It had three outlets in Washington and a fourth nearby in Fairfax, Virginia.

=== Sale to Issa Brothers (2021–2025) ===
In April 2021, the company was sold for a reported £100 million to the Issa brothers' EG Group, which also operates fast food franchises and had recently agreed to buy a majority stake in the Asda supermarket business. At that time, Leon had 71 outlets, of which 42 were operated by the company; the other 29 were franchises at transport hubs, in the UK and five other European countries.

In an October 2023 restructuring, EG Group sold most of its UK operations – including Leon – to Asda.

In October 2025, Dimbleby criticised Asda's ownership of Leon, saying that it could possibly destroy the brand.

=== John Vincent ownership (2025–) ===
In October 2025 John Vincent bought Leon back from Asda in a self-funded, debt-free deal for a price thought to be between £30m and £50m, less than the £100m he had sold it for. Vincent said that he hoped to turn around the company after losses every year since 2016, close unprofitable locations, and over the following four years to expand, mainly in London, and possibly overseas.

The sale included 46 Leon-owned restaurants, 20 UK franchises, three franchises in the Netherlands, and one in Italy. According to the Standard, over 1,000 staff across the chain were expected to transfer to the new ownership as part of the deal. In December 2025, citing losses and the challenges of changing work patterns, Vincent announced a major restructure of the chain with the closure of 20 of its restaurants, with the company entering administration shortly after. The company exited administration in 2026 with 43 restaurants.

== Corporate affairs ==
=== Senior leadership ===
The following have served as chief executives of the company since it was founded:

1. Henry Dimbleby (2004–2014)
2. John Vincent (2014–2021)
3. Glenn Edwards (2021–2023)
4. Mac Plumpton (2021–2025)
5. John Vincent (since 2025)

== Other activities ==
Leon has published several cookbooks, and developed a cookware and tableware line with retailer John Lewis.

Leon has also introduced a retail grocery range, including sauces and frozen meals, which were sold through UK supermarkets such as Sainsbury’s and Ocado.

Following their acquisition by Asda, Asda stores began to sell Leon-branded grocery products and sauces, and implemented Leon-branded coffee machines.
