= Allegra McEvedy =

English chef, broadcaster and writer

Allegra McEvedy MBE
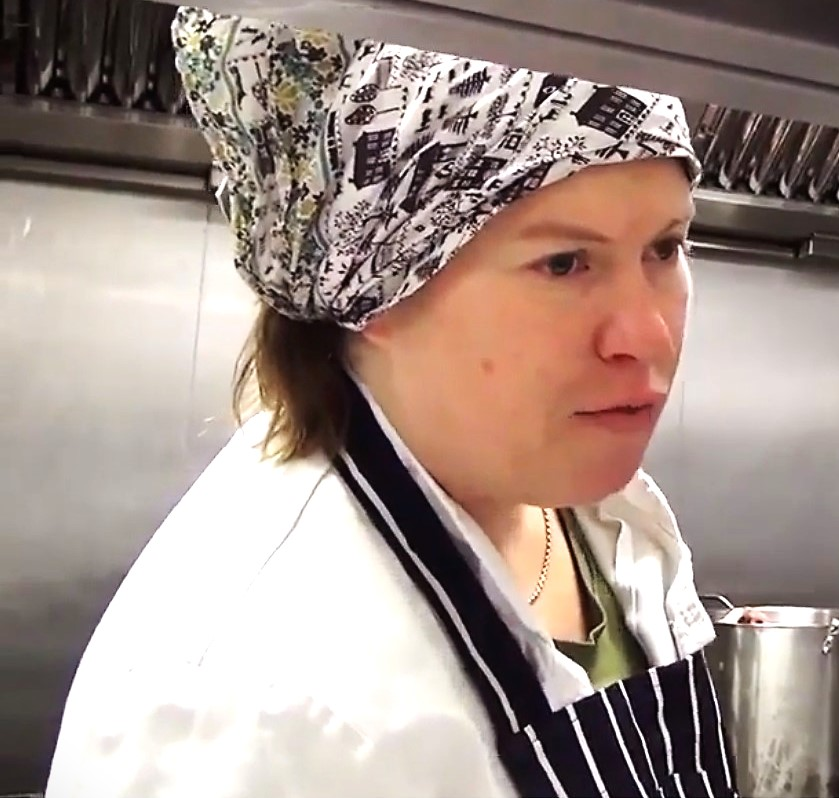
- McEvedy cooking in Blackfoot restaurant in 2016
- Born: Allegra Sarah Bazzett McEvedy; 23 November 1970 (age 55); Hammersmith, London, England
- Education: St Paul's Girls' School
- Occupations: Chef, broadcaster, writer
- Known for: Co-founder, Leon Restaurants
- Spouse: Susi Smither (2006–2012)
- Children: 2
- Parent: Colin McEvedy

Allegra Sarah Bazzett McEvedy (born 23 November 1970) is an English chef, broadcaster and writer.

== Early life ==
McEvedy was born and raised in Hammersmith. Her father Colin McEvedy was a consultant psychiatrist, historian and writer; her mother was a writer. She was privately educated at St Paul's Girls' School, attending the school at the same time as Daisy Garnett, later food columnist of The Observer.

== Career ==
McEvedy completed her classical French training in 1991 at the Cordon Bleu in London. She also obtained the Higher Certificate from the Wine & Spirit Education Trust.

She later worked at the Tabernacle in Notting Hill, Green's, The Belvedere in Holland Park, Alfred's, the Groucho Club and The River Café. She obtained her first Head Chef position at Tom Conran's restaurant The Cow, in Notting Hill, at the age of 24.

During a spell in the United States, facilitated by being awarded a special visa as 'an alien with extraordinary ability in the culinary arts', McEvedy worked at Rubicon and Jardinière in San Francisco, and ran the kitchen at Robert De Niro's New York City restaurant Tribeca Grill, regularly doing 500 covers a night. Whilst in New York she catered for an exclusive Democratic Party fundraiser, personally cooking for President Clinton. However, she became disillusioned with cooking "posh food for rich people", and put into action a plan to specialise in affordable dining when she returned to the UK.

Upon returning to London, McEvedy joined The Good Cook group, initially as Head Chef of The Tabernacle, a community restaurant in Notting Hill, and later as Head Chef of The Good Cook in Kensington High Street. In summer 2000 she set up the first outdoor café in the Zaha Hadid Pavilion at the Serpentine Gallery. Between 2002 and 2004, she was the inaugural Chef in Residence at the Institute of Contemporary Arts. McEvedy opened Blackfoot, a pork-focused restaurant in Exmouth Market, London, in December 2013; it remained open until February 2016.

=== Leon ===
McEvedy co-founded Leon, a healthy fast-food restaurant group, with Henry Dimbleby and John Vincent. Leon opened its first outlet in Carnaby Street in 2004. Six months after opening, Leon was named the "Best New Restaurant in Great Britain" at the Observer Food Monthly Awards. In March 2009 McEvedy gave up her role at Leon to focus on writing and television work, but she remains a shareholder in the business.

=== Writing, TV and radio ===
McEvedy published her first book, The Good Cook (Hodder) in 2000, and in October 2006 published her second, Allegra McEvedy's Colour Cookbook (Kyle Cathie). It won the International Association of Culinary Professionals 2007 Cookbook award in the Chefs and Restaurants category. In October 2008 her third book, Leon: Ingredients & Recipes (Conran Octopus); Giles Coren of The Times said it was "Without doubt, the coolest food book I have ever seen."

McEvedy was the Chef in Residence at The Guardian starting 2007. However, her last article there was printed in February 2015.

She was the chef in the 2008 BBC television series The Supersizers Go... with Giles Coren and Sue Perkins recreating historical British dishes such as Eel pie, Paraffin Cake and Tansy.

A six-part BBC Two series, Economy Gastronomy, presented by McEvedy and Paul Merrett, began in August 2009 and was accompanied by a book of the same title.

In 2015, she replaced Mary Berry as one of the two judges in the BBC TV series Junior Bake Off. She also judged the 2016 Junior Bake Off alongside Nadiya Hussain. In 2016, she was one of the judges of BBC Radio 4 Food and Farming Awards, judging the Cook of the Year award.

In 2018, she hosted the CBBC series Step Up to the Plate with Fred Sirieix, in which they tested eight young people in each episode to see if they have the skills to run their own restaurant.

== Personal life ==
In August 2006, she formed a civil partnership with Susi Smither. The couple dissolved their civil partnership in 2012. She was engaged to Jack Monroe but the relationship ended in 2015, before they married.

She was appointed Member of the Order of the British Empire (MBE) in the 2008 Birthday Honours for services to the hospitality industry.

McEvedy's mother died when she was aged 17. As a consequence of this, and the stress arising from coming out as gay, she found adjusting to adult life difficult and was expelled from school, though she nevertheless took and passed her A-levels.

=== Charity work ===
Allegra McEvedy has been a Patron of The Fairtrade Foundation since 2012.

== Bibliography ==
- The Good Cook (2000)
- Allegra's Colour Cookbook (2006)
- Colouring the Seasons: A Cook's Guide, co-authored with Fred Dickieson (2007)
- Leon: Ingredients & Recipes (2008)
- Economy Gastronomy: Eat Better and Spend Less, co-authored with Paul Merrett (2009)
- Turkish delights with Allegra McEvedy (2012)
- Bought, Borrowed & Stolen: Recipes and Knives from a Travelling Chef
- Big Table, Busy Kitchen: 200 Recipes for Life (2013)
- Around the World in 120 Recipes (2013)
- Quick, Quick, Slow (2016)
