= Step Up to the Plate =

2008 United Kingdom-based television programme

Step Up to the Plate is a 2008 United Kingdom-based television programme, produced by Endemol, for the BBC. It was hosted by Anton du Beke and Loyd Grossman

== Format ==
Three amateur cooks were pitched against two professional chefs, to cook a three course meal designed by the amateur cooks. Loyd Grosman stepped up to the plate to judge the courses. The amateur cooks stood to win a prize fund of at least £5000. Whenever the chefs won the fund would increase by £1000.

== Broadcast ==
The programme was broadcast on BBC1 and BBC2 in two runs during 2008. The first episode was broadcast on 21 July 2008 and the last of the regular schedule (episode 39) was broadcast on 12 Dec 2008. For some unknown reason, the final episode wasn't broadcast for 9 months eventually being aired on 2 Aug 2009.
