= Sustainable Restaurant Association =

The Sustainable Restaurant Association
- Type: Not-for-profit organization; Trade association
- Industry: Hospitality & Food Service
- Founded: 2009
- Founder: Simon Heppner, Giles Gibbons
- Headquarters: London, United Kingdom
- Area served: Predominantly UK, Global
- Key people: Raymond Blanc OBE (President) Prue Leith (Vice President) Juliane Caillouette Noble (Managing Director)
- Website: thesra.org

The Sustainable Restaurant Association (SRA) is a not-for-profit membership organisation, based in the United Kingdom, which supports food-service businesses working towards sustainability in their sector and guides customers towards more sustainable dining choices through its Food Made Good Standard.

Since its launch in 2009, the organisation has expanded its remit beyond traditional restaurants to include hotels, cafés, contract catering and in-flight catering, and expanded its geographical scope beyond the United Kingdom with a license programme that enables other territories to rapidly set up and deliver the Food Made Good Standard. As of October 2024, The SRA collaborates with local organisations to deliver the Food Made Good Standard in Hong Kong, Italy, Japan, Taiwan, Singapore and the UAE.

== History ==
The concept of an association to promote sustainability in the restaurant sector originated at the London-based consultancy, Good Business, and was developed by Simon Heppner and Giles Gibbons during 2008. The Garfield Weston Foundation, the Esmée Fairbairn Foundation and the Mark Leonard Trust provided funding and in 2009, The SRA launched with founder members Carluccio's, Feng Sushi and Wahaca.

The organisation has continued to evolve and develop each year since then, growing from working with 52 restaurants at launch to being present in over 12,000 kitchens in 2019. In 2012, Raymond Blanc OBE became President of the Association and in 2017, Prue Leith became the Vice President.

== Sustainability framework ==
The challenge for many businesses working in foodservice was that while sustainability was seen as important, there was no consistency in the way it was defined or addressed. This created confusion the mind of customers about what constituted a sustainable restaurant, and a barrier to action for restaurateurs, who were unclear on where to focus attention.

One of the key aims of the organisation has been to demystify sustainability in food service by creating a framework, covering all the elements, which go towards making a business more sustainable. The Food Made Good Framework was developed in partnership with subject specific specialists such as RSPCA, Fair Trade, Soil Association, Compassion in World Farming and the Carbon Trust, as well as other organisations working more generally in the area of foodservice sustainability such as Sustain.

The framework that underlies the Food Made Good Standard is divided into three main sections (Sourcing, Society and Environment), and forms the basis of the assessment process by which The SRA evaluates the practices of a business. Each section is composed of topic areas that address different operational aspects of foodservice operations.

=== Sourcing ===
- Celebrate Provenance
- Support Farmers and Fishers
- More Plants, Better Meat
- Source Seafood Sustainably

=== Society ===
- Treat Staff Fairly
- Feed People Well
- Support the Community

=== Environment ===
- Reduce Your footprint
- Waste No Food
- Reduce, Reuse, Recycle

Since 2009, the SRA has rated the sustainability performance of thousands of food-service operators against this Framework and awarded one, two or three stars. These stars now appear in restaurant windows, on menus and on websites as a signal to diners that the business is taking sustainability seriously.

In 2015, the SRA launched the Food Made Good Standard, which became the new brand for the sustainability rating. This was done to increase accessibility with consumers and hospitality operators that do not consider themselves to be restaurants. The accreditation aims to encourage, support and recognise sustainability practices across the food and beverage industry worldwide.

The Food Made Good Standard has undergone several iterations since 2015. The most recently re-launch was in June 2023, when the SRA launched a new version of the Food Made Good Standard. Supported by a more user-friendly platform, the Standard is now globally accessible, applicable and relevant, allowing restaurants anywhere in the world to sign up and assess their sustainability. As of October 2024, the Standard can be accessed and used in four languages: English, Spanish, Japanese and Traditional Chinese.

== Campaigns ==
In 2010, the SRA carried out research into food waste in different types of restaurants, aiming to understand the scope of the issue and clarify what constituted plate-waste, spoilage and prep waste. The results indicated that, on average, restaurants were producing half a kilo of waste per diner, and that 65% was prep waste, 30% plate waste and only 5% spoilage. The publication of the results shed light on the issue for the first time, appearing in WRAP's report Understanding out of home consumer food waste, and prompted The SRA to develop the Too Good To Waste campaign, which encouraged diners to ask for, and restaurants to offer, doggy boxes to take leftovers home.
