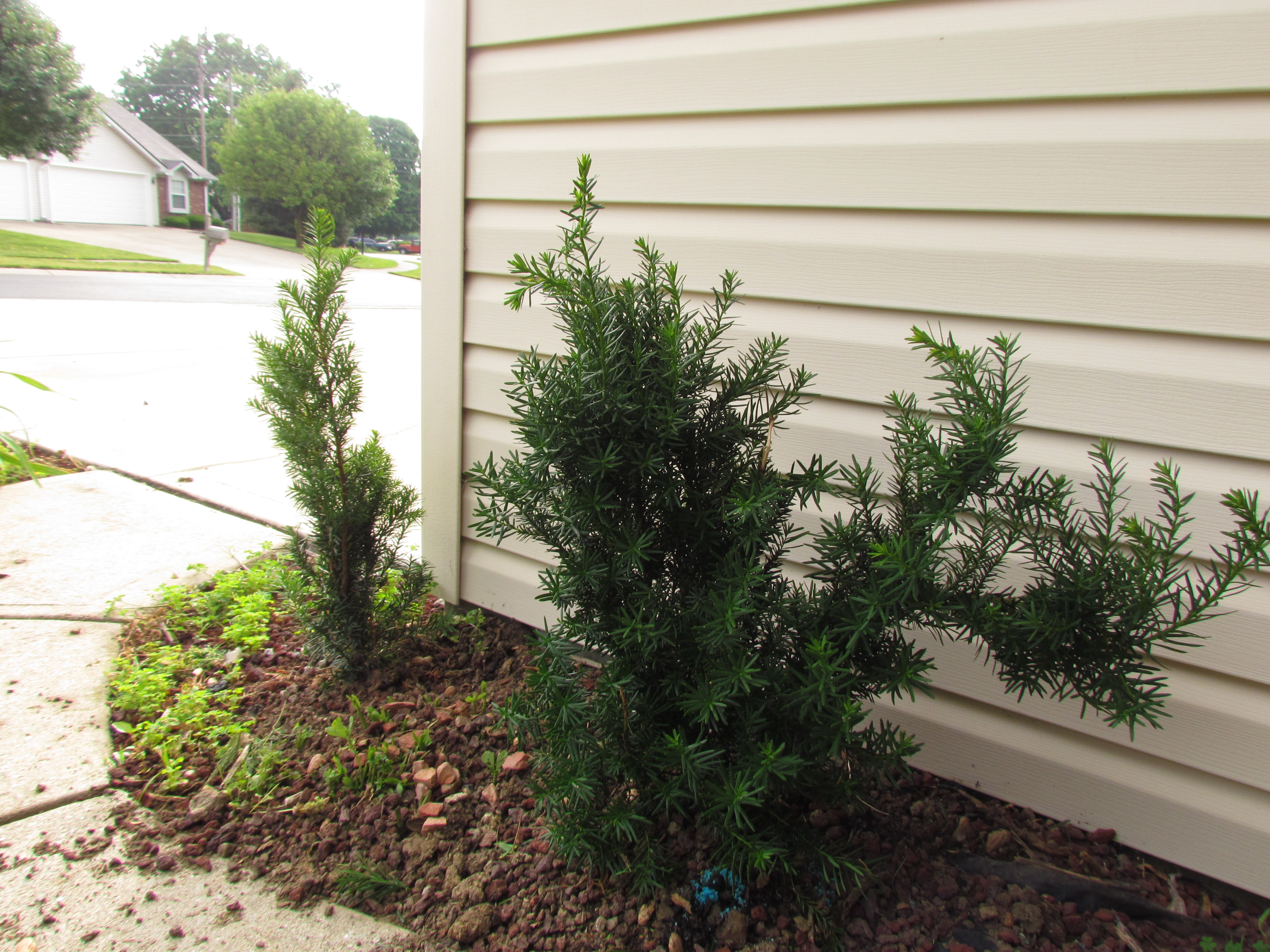
- Two immature Taxus media var. hicksii yews planted in central Indiana. Although T. media are slow-growing, the specimen on the right may require pruning within 2–3 years in order to avoid blocking the nearby sidewalk.

Scientific classification
- Kingdom: Plantae
- Clade: Tracheophytes
- Clade: Gymnosperms
- Division: Pinophyta
- Class: Pinopsida
- Order: Cupressales
- Family: Taxaceae
- Genus: Taxus
- Species: T. × media

Binomial name
- Taxus × media Rehder

= Taxus × media =

Hybrid plant species

Taxus × media, called the hybrid yew, intermediate yew, Anglo-Japanese yew, or Anglojap yew, is a hybrid species of yew created as the offspring of English yew Taxus baccata and Japanese yew Taxus cuspidata. This hybridization is thought to have been first performed by the Massachusetts-based horticulturalist T.D. Hatfield in the early 1900s.

Taxus × media is grown in a large number of shrubby, often wide-spreading, cultivars under a variety of names.

== Description ==
Taxus × media is among the smallest extant species in the genus Taxus and (depending upon cultivar) may not even grow to the size of what one would consider a typical tree. Immature shrubs are very small and achieve (over the time span of ten to twenty years) heights of at most 20 ft (6.1 m) and diameters of at most 12 ft (3.7 m), depending on the cultivar. Furthermore, T. × media is known to grow rather slowly and is not injured by frequent pruning, making this hybrid very desirable as a hedge in low-maintenance landscaping and also a good candidate for bonsai.

Like most yew species, T. × media can thrive in many soil types and is tolerant to temporary fluctuations in moisture, but is highly prone to developing root rot in wet, poorly-drained conditions.

== Toxicity ==
Like all yews, Taxus × media contains a high level of taxines in its branches, needles, and seeds. Taxines are toxic to the mammalian heart.

== Cultivars ==
Variety	Alternate names	Image	Sex	Habit Characteristics	Developed/ Selected by	Notes
Beanpole	"Bean pole"		Female	Tall, columnar. May reach up to 10 ft (3.0 m) in height.	Vermeulen Nursery	
Brownii	"Brown's yew"		Male	Broad, globular. May grow up to 10 ft (3.0 m) high and 12 ft (3.7 m) in diameter.	T.D. Hatfield	Named after R.T. Brown, a friend of Hatfield's.
Densiformis	"Dense yew" "Dense Spreading Yew"		Female	Short, wide spreading. This cultivar can reach a diameter exceeding 10 ft (3.0 m); nonetheless, it does not grow much past 5 ft (1.5 m) in height.		
Hatfieldii	"Hatfield yew"		Male	Tall, pyramidal. May reach up to 15 ft (4.6 m) high and 10 ft (3.0 m) in diameter.	T.D. Hatfield	Named after T.D. Hatfield by Alfred Rehder.
Hicksii	"Hick's yew" "Hicks yew" "Costich"*		Both*	Tall, columnar. May reach a height close to 20 ft (6.1 m).	Henry Hicks at Hicks Nurseries	One of the most widely grown T. × media cultivars. *What is often referred to as 'Hicksii' by nurseries was first categorized as two separate cultivars by horticulturalist L.C. Chadwick: 'Hicksii', a female cultivar, and 'Costich', a similar male cultivar. Despite this, Hicks Nurseries sold both under the name 'Hicksii".
Kelseyi	"Kelsey yew" "Berrybush yew"		Female	Tall, broad. May reach up to 15 ft (4.6 m) in height, and 10 ft (3.0 m) in diameter.	John Vermeulen	Named in honor of Frederick Wallace Kelsey, a nurseryman and brother of Francis Kelsey.
Tauntonii	"Taunton's yew" "Taunton yew"			Short, wide spreading. May reach up to 4 ft (1.2 m) tall and 6 ft (1.8 m) in diameter.		
Wardii	"Ward's yew"		Female	Grows short and wide. May reach up to 6 ft (1.8 m) tall and 20 ft (6.0 m) in diameter.		Named after Charles Willis Ward.
