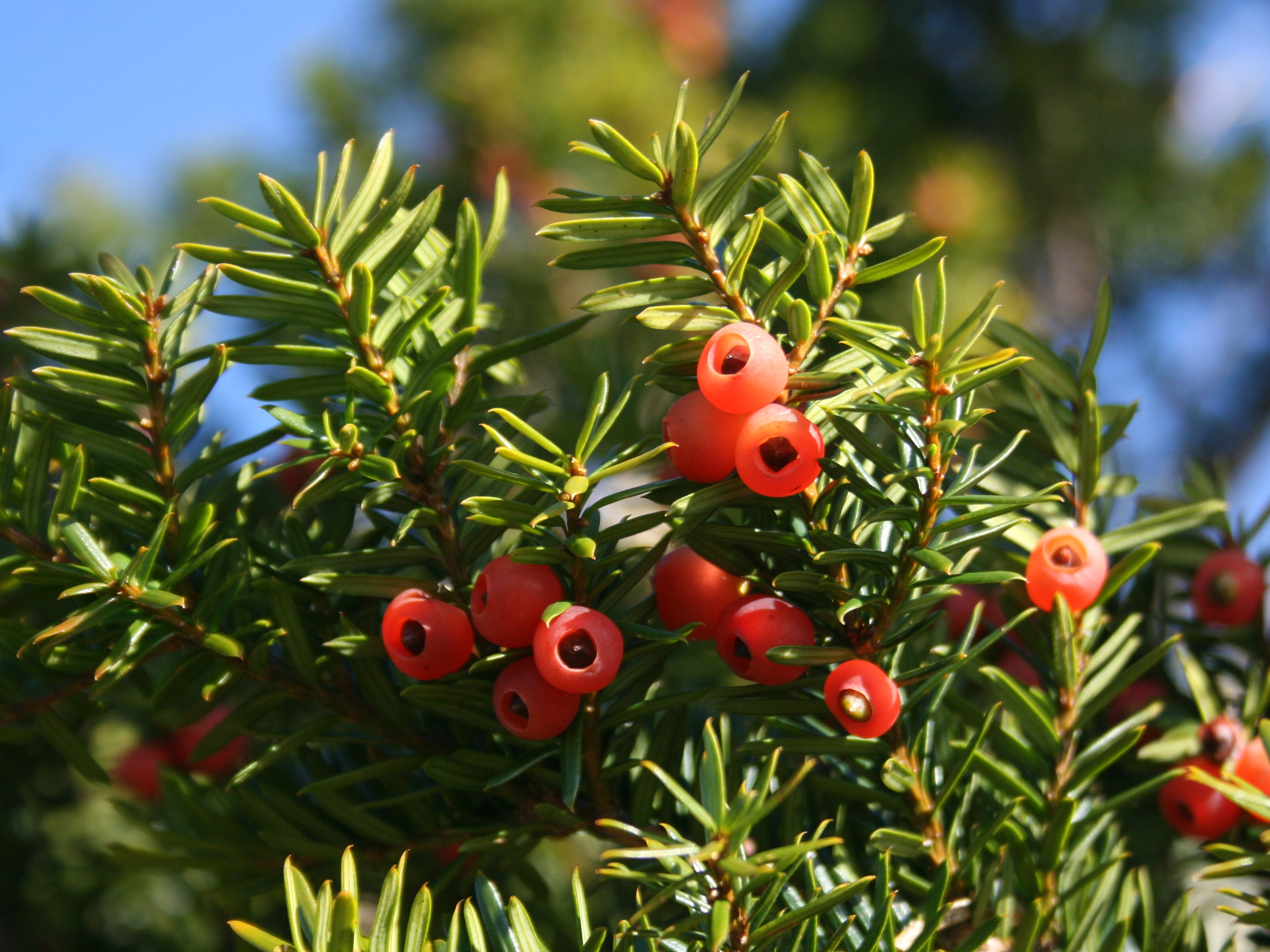

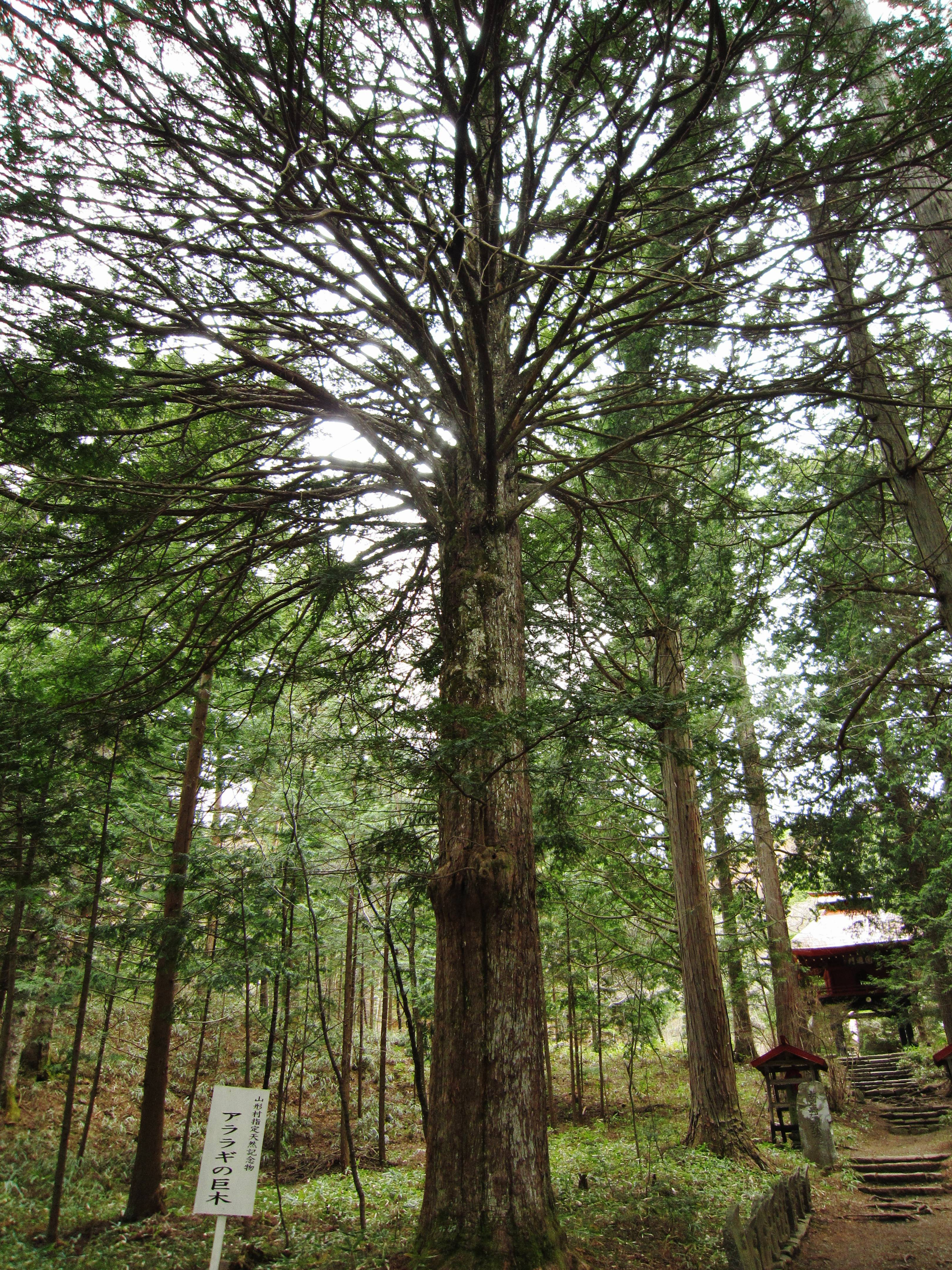

Conservation status
- Least Concern (IUCN 3.1)

Scientific classification
- Kingdom: Plantae
- Clade: Tracheophytes
- Clade: Gymnosperms
- Division: Pinophyta
- Class: Pinopsida
- Order: Cupressales
- Family: Taxaceae
- Genus: Taxus
- Species: T. cuspidata

Binomial name
- Taxus cuspidata Siebold & Zucc.

= Taxus cuspidata =

Species of plant

Taxus cuspidata, the Japanese yew or spreading yew, is a conifer of the family Taxaceae, native to Japan, Korea, northeast China and the extreme southeast of Russia.

== Names ==
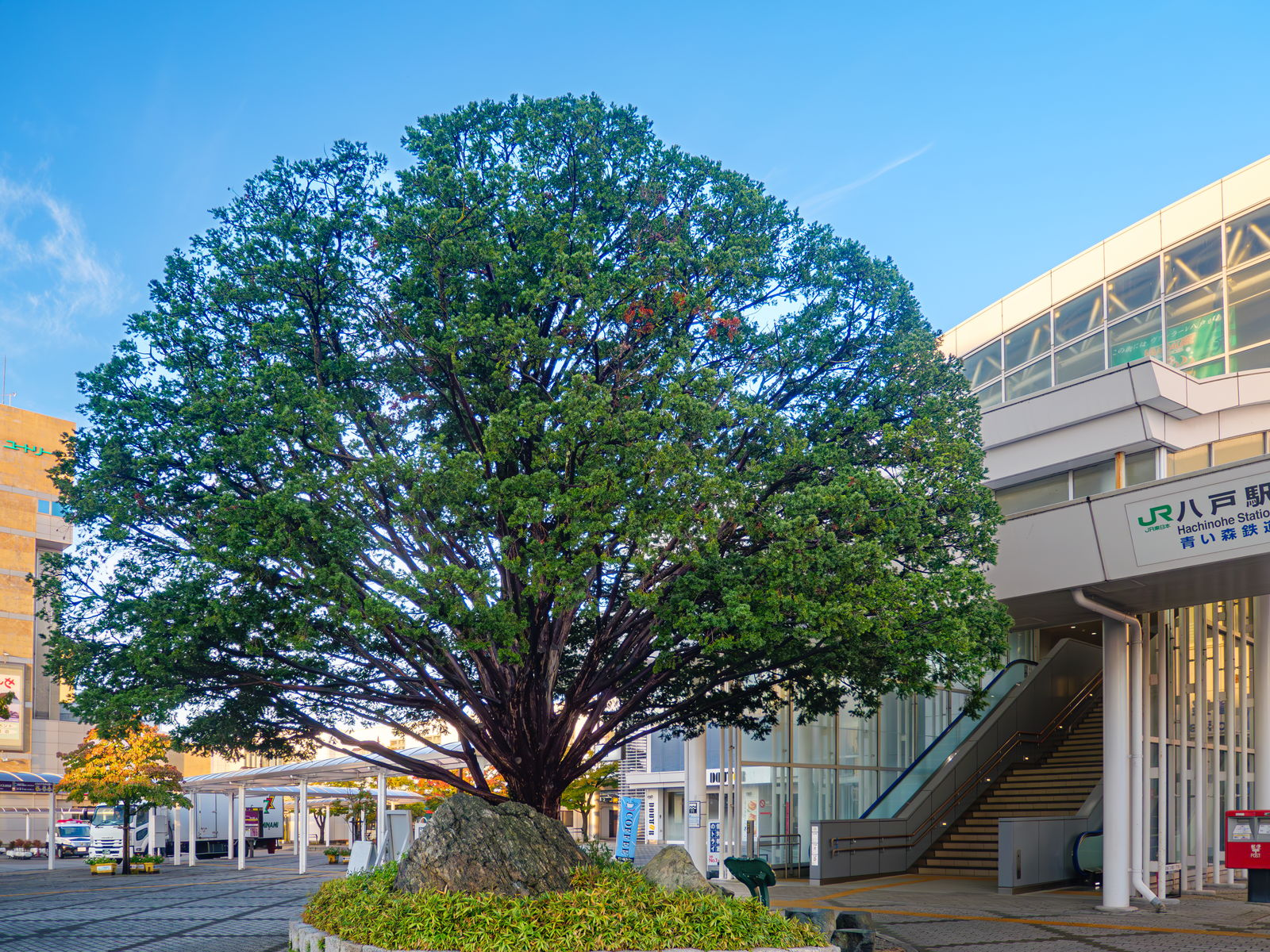
Outside Hachinohe Station

In Japan, the tree is known as ichi'i (一位), meaning "first rank". This is because first rank courtiers carried shaku scepters made of yew. Other Japanese names include jakunoki, araragi, and onko. In the Ainu language, it is called rarmani.

In China, it is called dongbei hongdoushan (東北紅豆杉 "northeastern red bean fir"), zishan (紫杉 "purple fir"), or chi bo song (赤柏松 "red cypress-pine").

== Description ==
It is an evergreen tree or large shrub growing to 10–18 m tall, with a trunk up to 60 cm diameter. The leaves are lanceolate, flat, dark green, 1–3 cm long and 2–3 mm broad, arranged spirally on the stem, but with the leaf bases twisted to align the leaves in two flattish rows either side of the stem except on erect leading shoots where the spiral arrangement is more obvious.

The seed cones are highly modified, each cone containing a single seed 4–8 mm long partly surrounded by a modified scale which develops into a soft, bright red berry-like structure called an aril, 8–12 mm long and wide and open at the end. The arils are mature 6–9 months after pollination. Taxus cuspidata is the fastest growing species of yew.

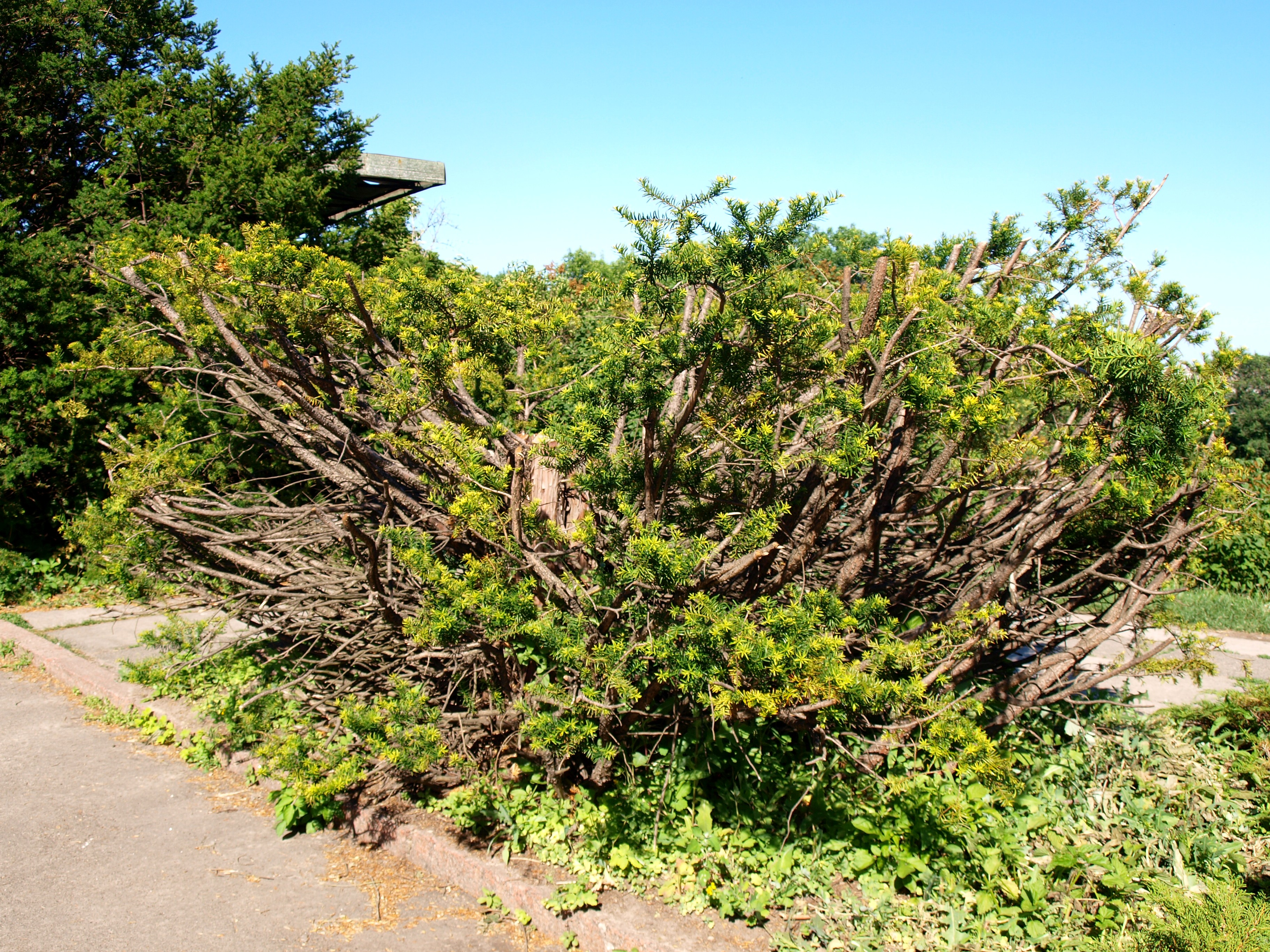

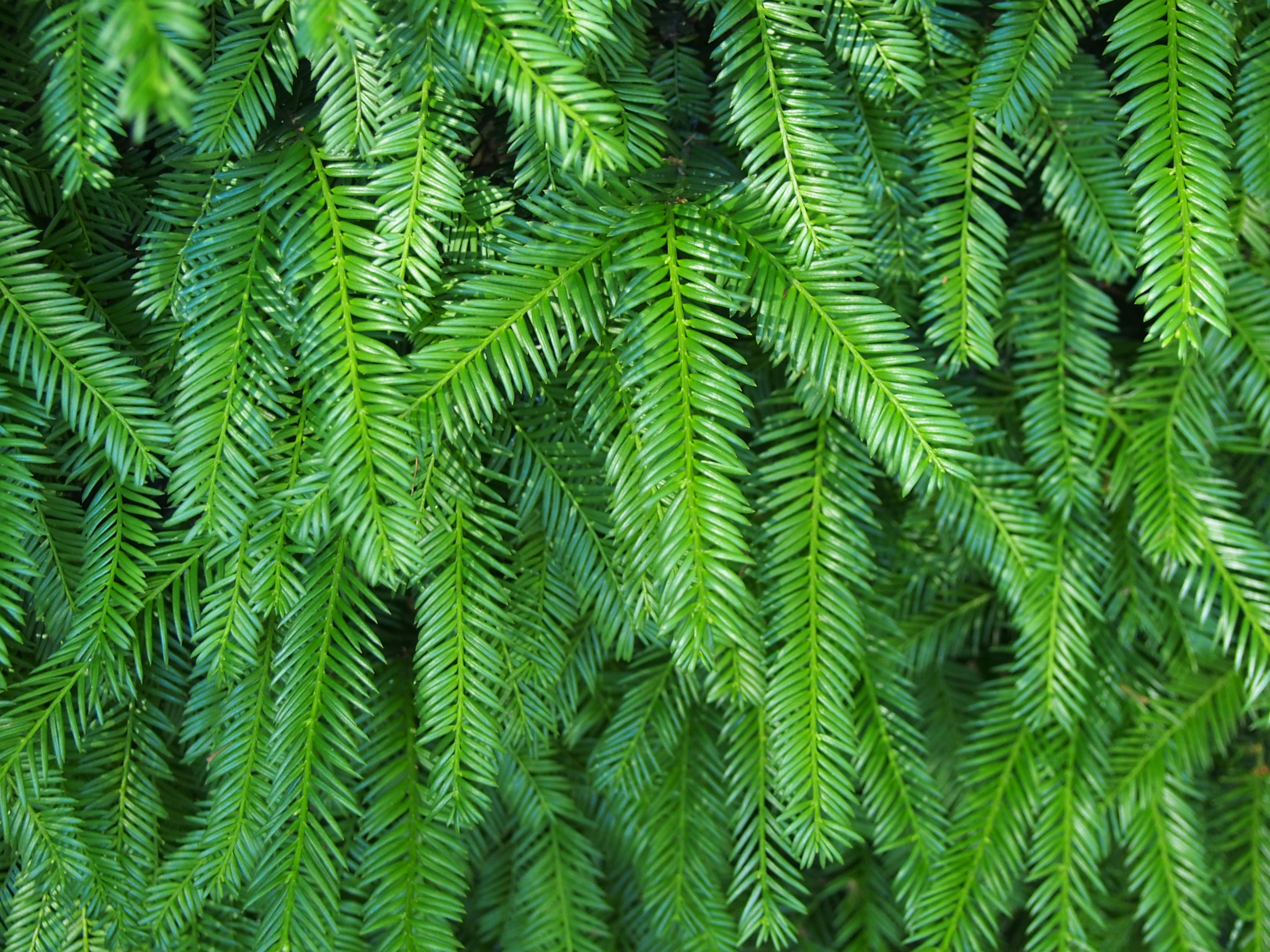
Closeup of the leaves

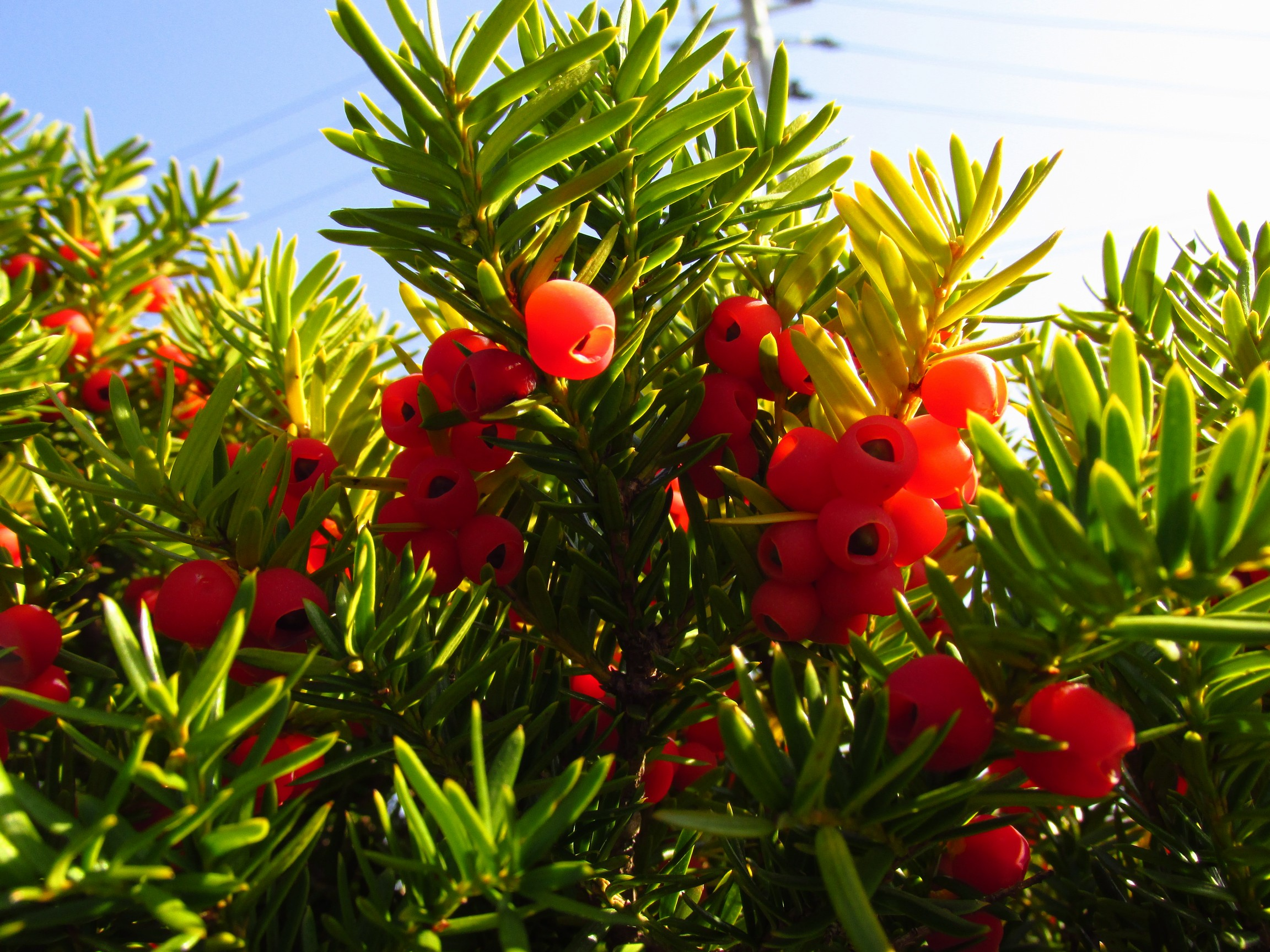
Berries

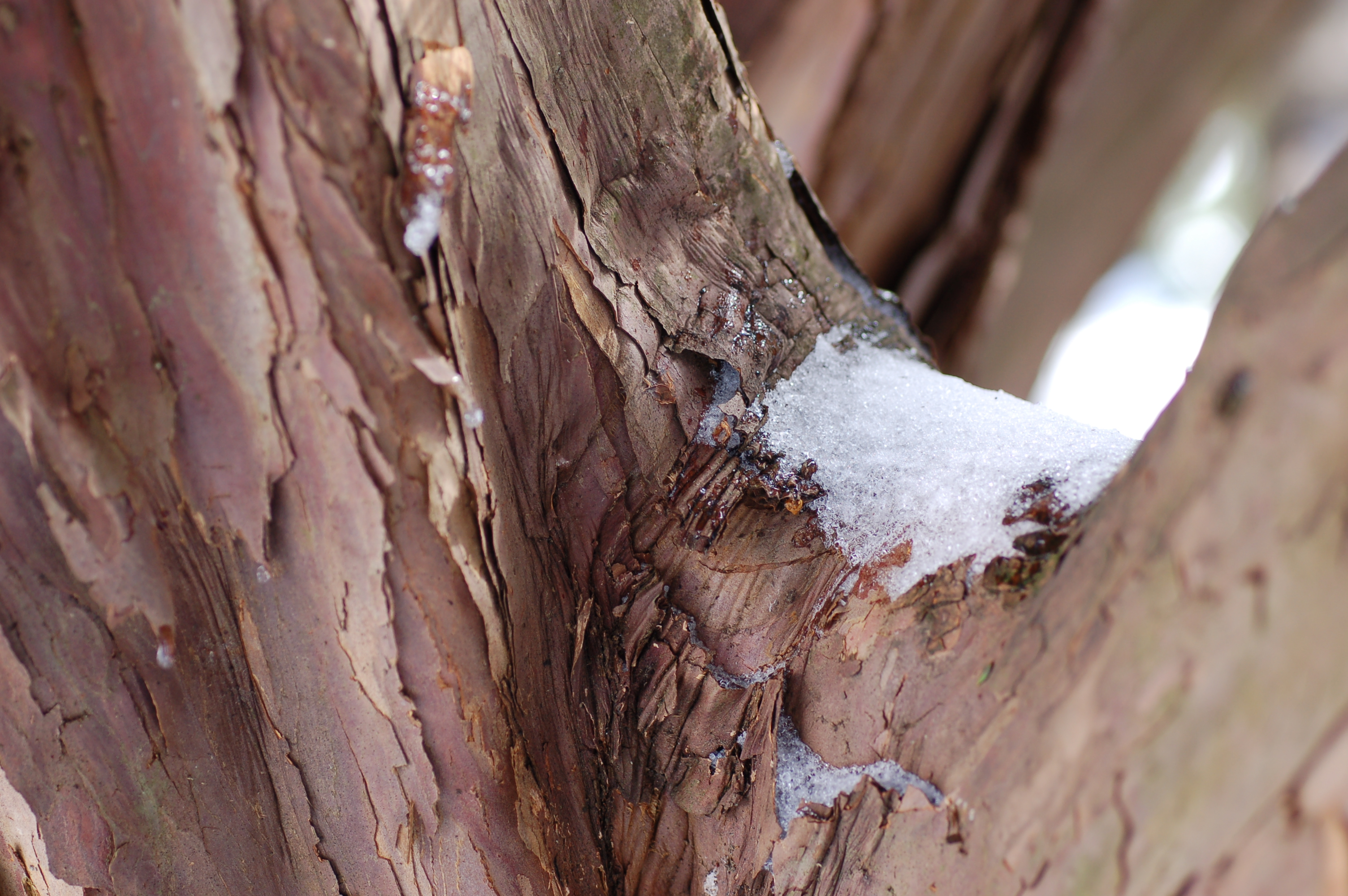
Rough bark

== Age ==
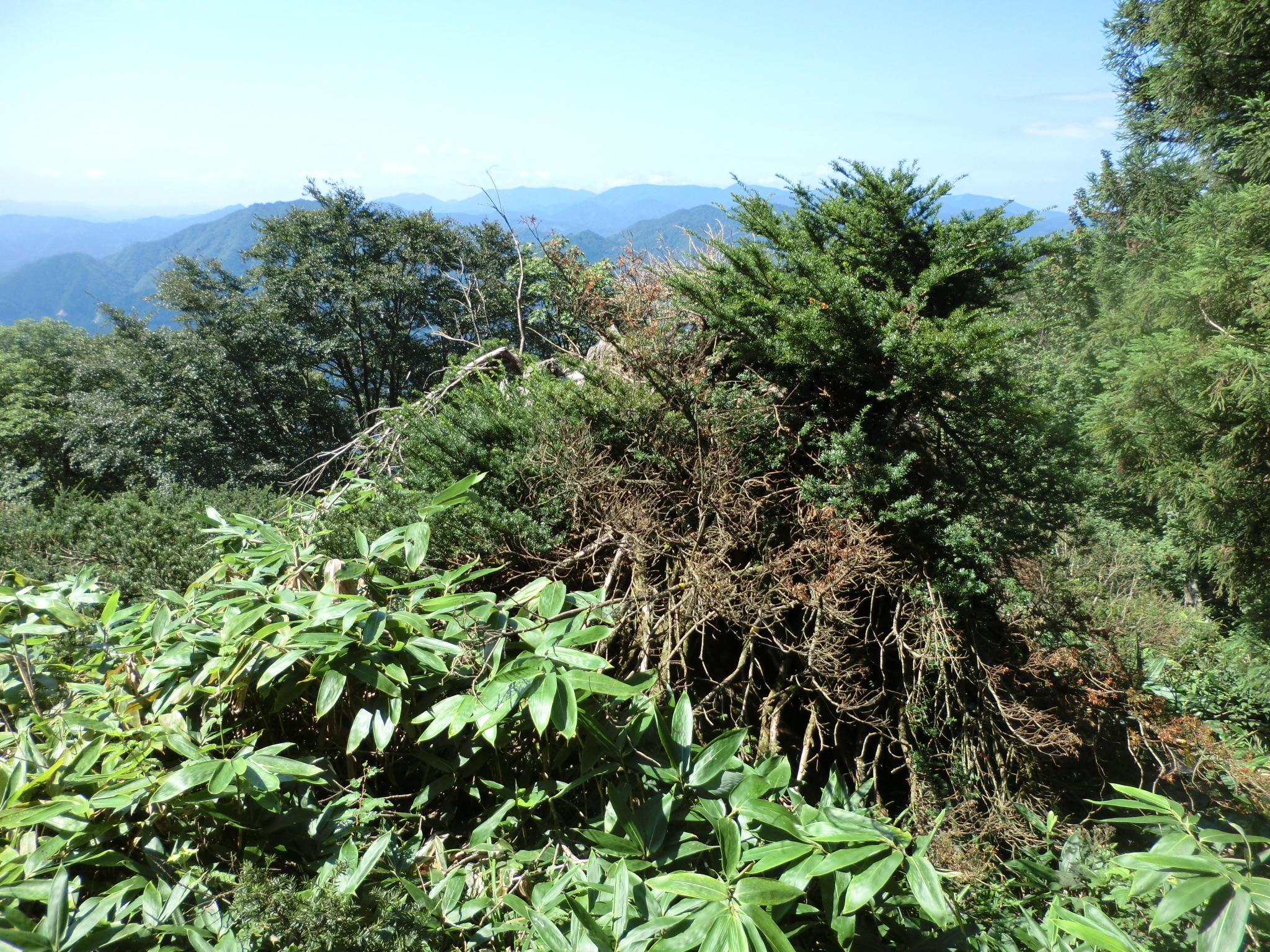
The Sentsūzan-no-Ichii, a 2,000-year-old Japanese yew on Mount Sentsū

Japanese yew is a long-lived tree. Individual trees from Sikhote-Alin are known to have been 1,000 years old.

One specimen in Tottori, Japan, known as Sentsūzan-no-Ichii ("Yew of Mount Sentsū") is estimated at 2,000 years old.

== Toxicity ==
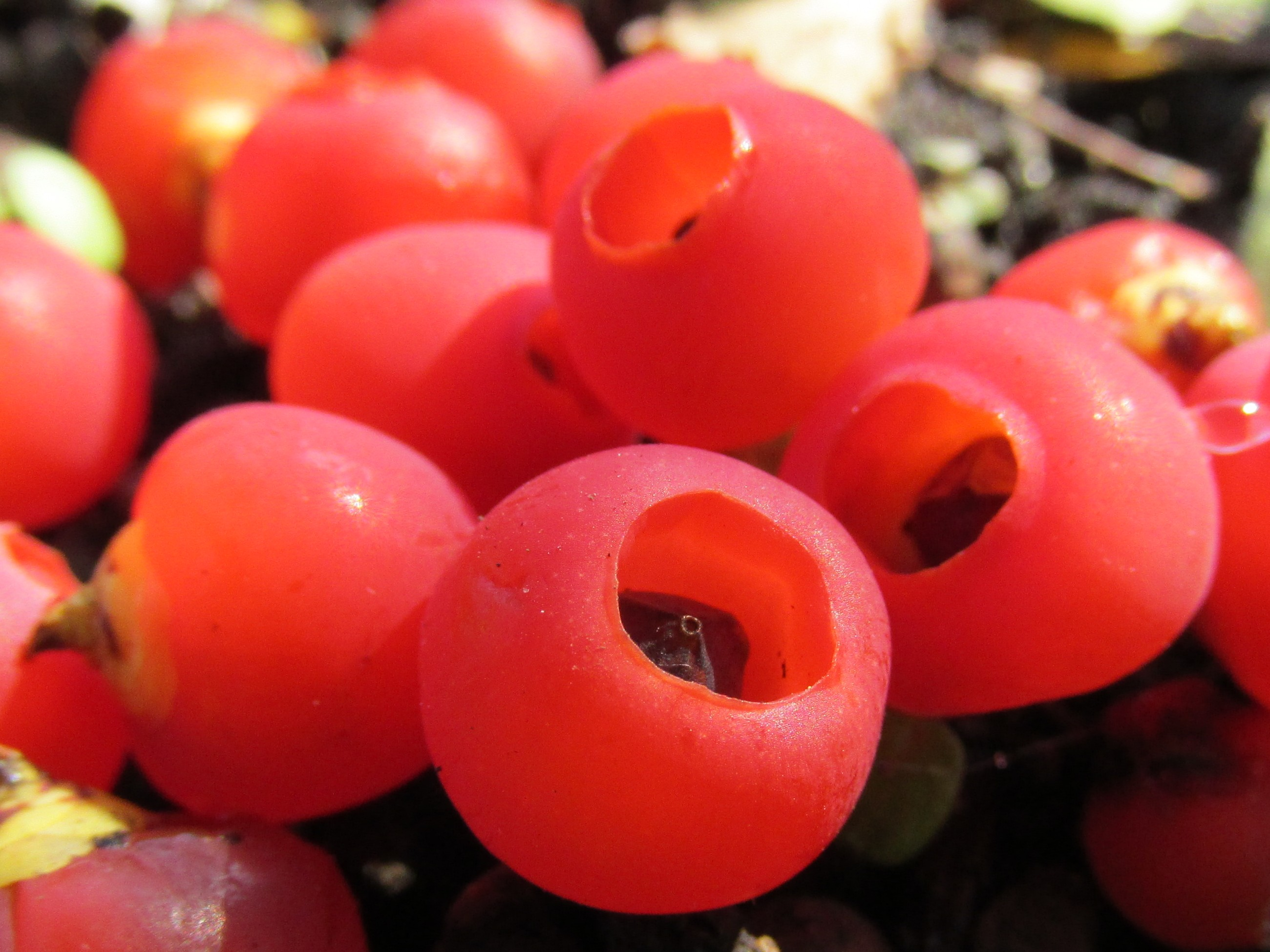
Japanese yew berries, with poisonous seed inside the red arils

The entire yew bush, except the aril (the red flesh of the berry covering the seed), is toxic due to a group of chemicals called taxine alkaloids. Their cardiotoxicity is well known and act via calcium and sodium channel antagonism, causing an increase in cytoplasmic calcium currents of the myocardial cells. The seeds contains the highest concentrations of these alkaloids. If any leaves or seeds of the plant are ingested, urgent medical advice is recommended, as well as observation for at least 6 hours after the point of ingestion. The most cardiotoxic taxine is Taxine B followed by Taxine A; Taxine B also happens to be the most common alkaloid in the Taxus species.

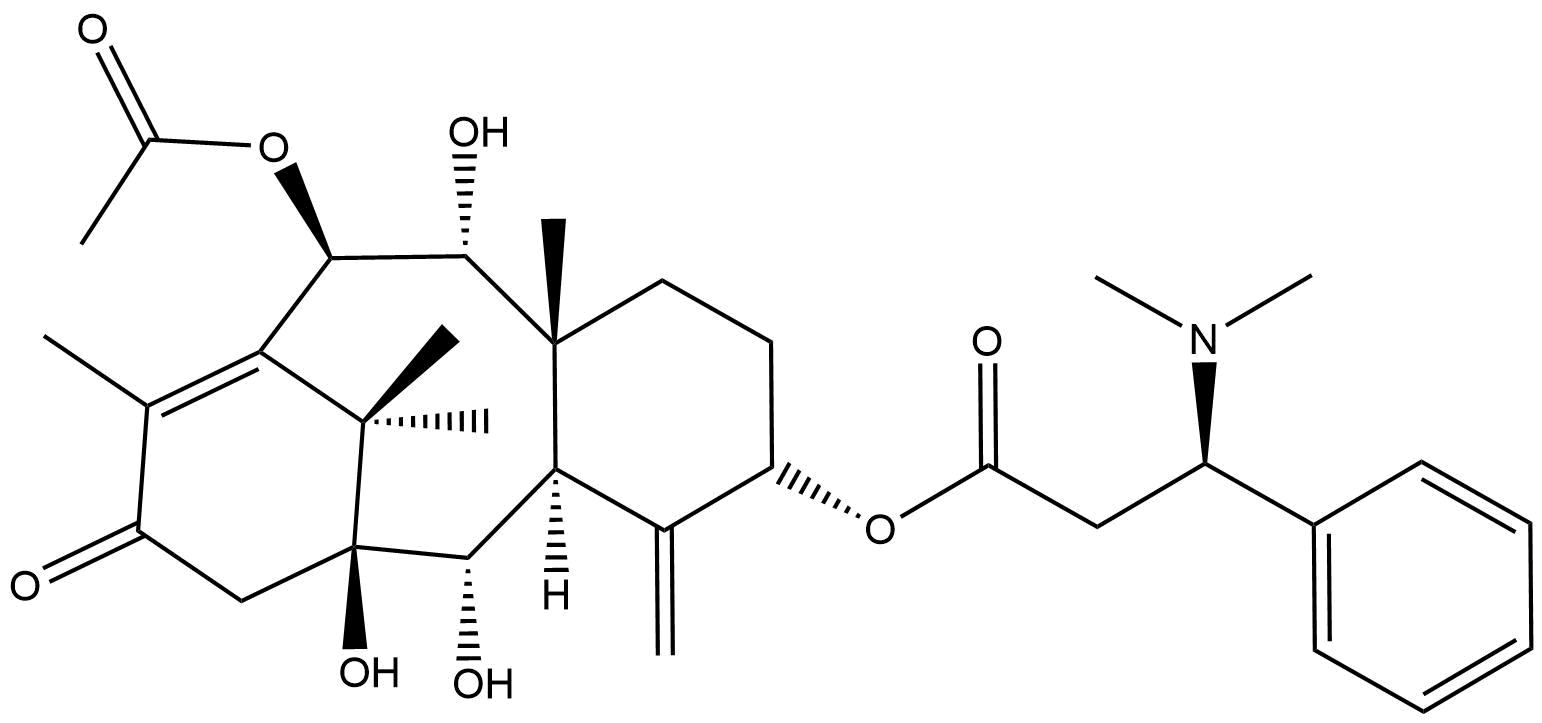
The structure of Taxine B, the cardiotoxic chemical in the yew plant

Yew poisonings are relatively common in both domestic and wild animals who consume the plant accidentally. The taxine alkaloids are absorbed quickly from the intestine and in high enough quantities can cause death due to general cardiac failure, cardiac arrest, or respiratory failure. Taxines are also absorbed efficiently via the skin and Taxus species should thus be handled with care and preferably with gloves. Taxus baccata leaves contain approximately 5 mg of taxines per 1g of leaves. The estimated (i.e. not by any means a fact) lethal dose (LD_{min}) of Taxus baccata leaves is 3.0-6.5 mg/kg body weight for humans There is currently no known antidotes for yew poisoning, but drugs such as atropine have been used to treat the symptoms. Taxine remains in the plant all year, with maximal concentrations appearing during the winter. Dried yew plant material retains its toxicity for several months and even increases its toxicity as the water is removed, fallen leaves are also toxic. Although poisoning usually occurs when leaves of yew trees are eaten, in at least one case a victim inhaled sawdust from a yew tree.

The following book made it clear that it is very difficult to measure taxine alkaloids and that this is a major reason as to why different studies show different results. Minimum lethal dose, oral LD_{min} for many different animals were tested:

- Chicken 82.5 mg/kg
- Cow 10.0 mg/kg
- Dog 11.5 mg/kg
- Goat 60.0 mg/kg
- Horse 1.0–2.0 mg/kg
- Pig 3.5 mg/kg
- Sheep 12.5 mg/kg

Several studies have found taxine LD_{50} values under 20 mg/kg in mice and rats.

For symptoms of human toxicity see Taxine alkaloids

Male and monoecious yews in this genus release toxic pollen, which can cause the mild symptoms see Taxine alkaloids. The pollen are also a trigger for asthma. These pollen grains are only 15 microns in size, and can easily pass through most window screens.

Taxus cuspidata is a source of taxoleic acid.

== Uses ==
The tree is widely grown in eastern Asia and eastern North America as an ornamental plant.

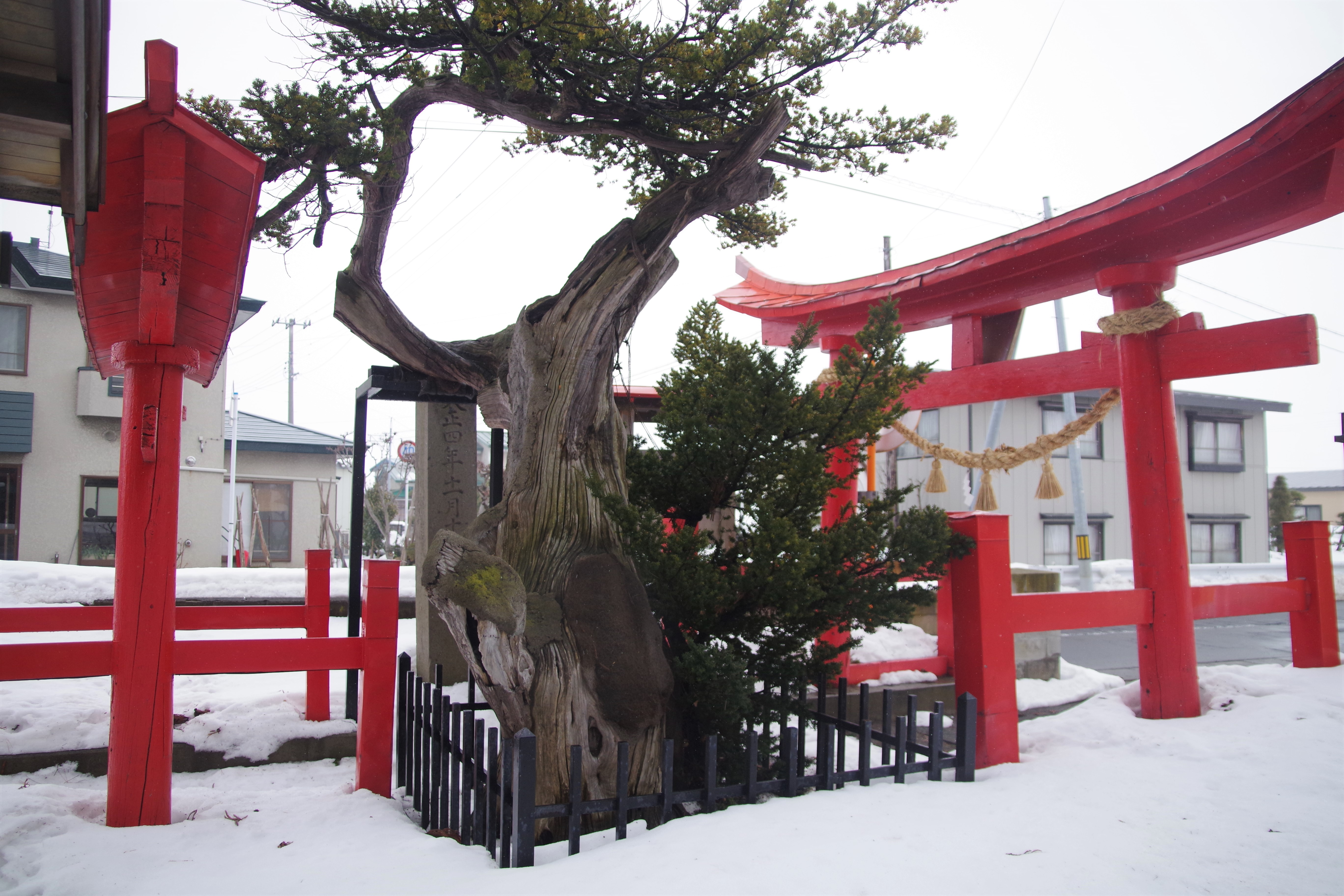
Outside a Shinto shrine in Fujisaki, Aomori

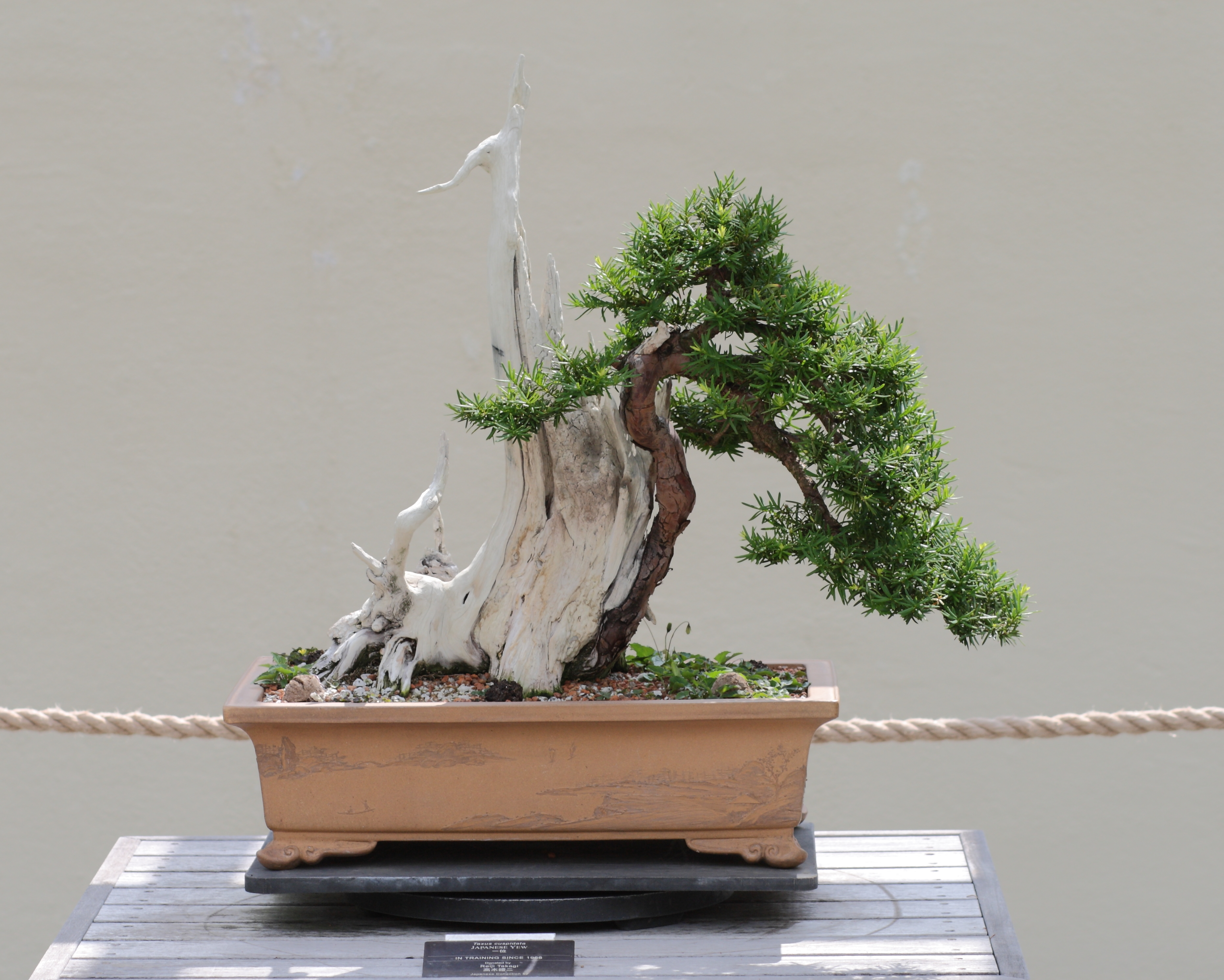
As bonsai

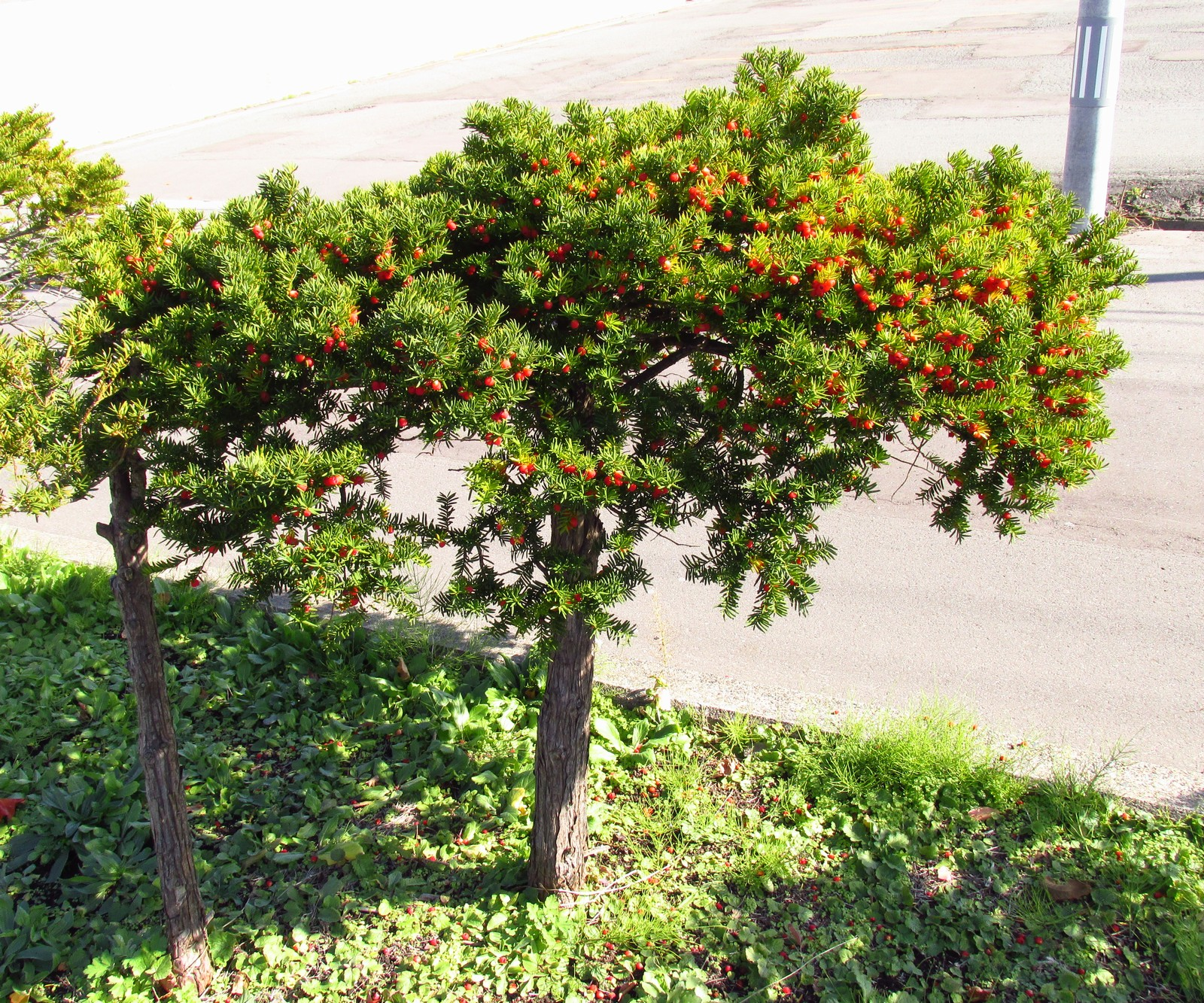
On a sidewalk
